= General Motors Delta platform =

GM Delta platform
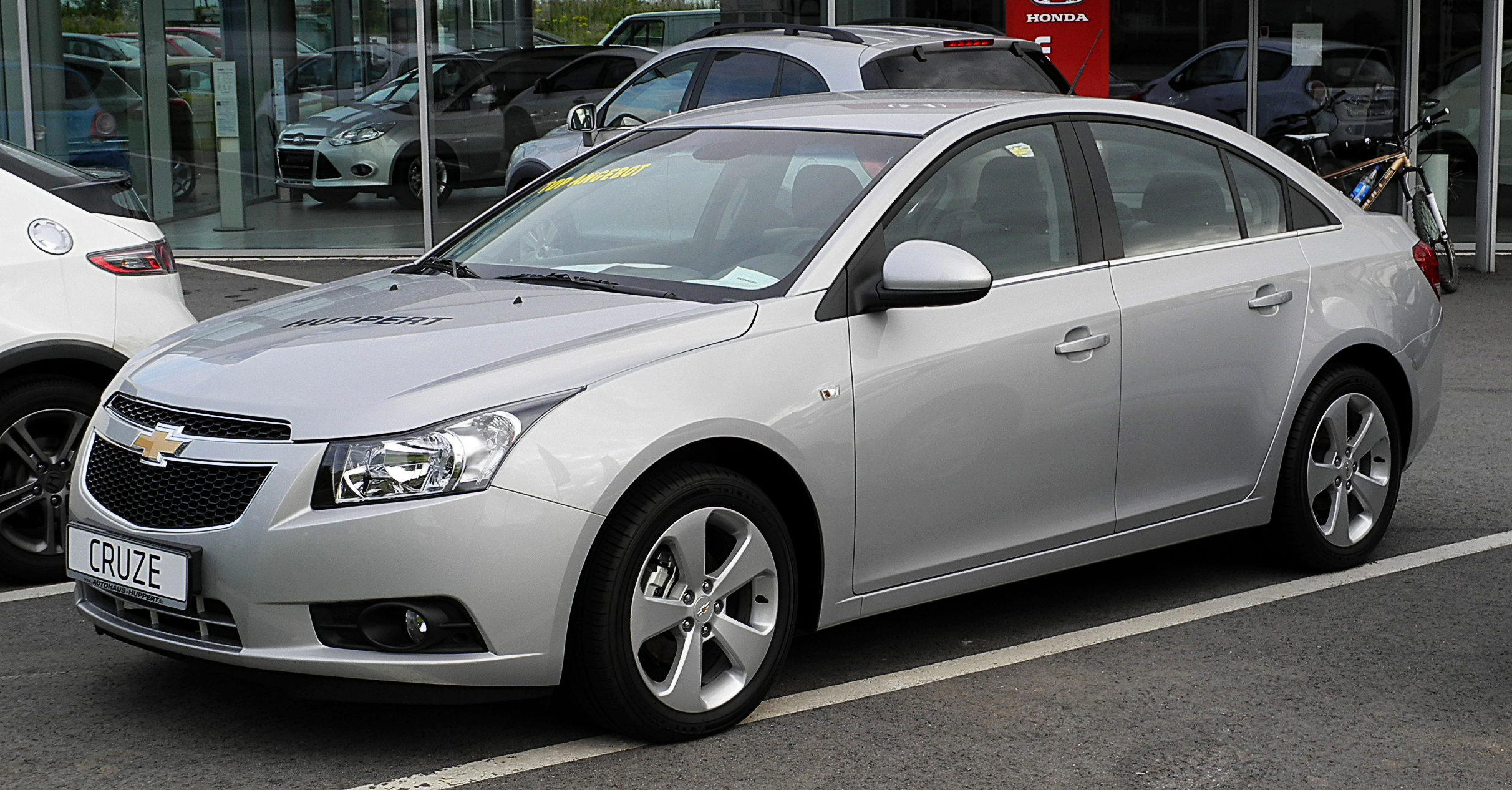

Overview
- Manufacturer: General Motors
- Production: 2002–present

Body and chassis
- Class: Compact (C)
- Body styles: 2-door coupe 2-door convertible 3-door hatchback 4-door sedan 4-door SUV; 5-door hatchback

Chronology
- Predecessor: GM J platform GM R platform GM T platform GM Z platform
- Successor: For Opel & Vauxhall: PSA EMP2 platform For GM: GM VSS-F

Delta is a General Motors compact front-wheel-drive automobile and crossover SUV platform, originally developed by Opel Group. It was a successor to the Opel T platform; it also replaced J platform and the Z platform used by the Saturn S-Series. The platform debuted in the 2003 Saturn Ion. Vehicles of this platform generally carry the letter "A" in the fourth character of their VINs.

Delta generally uses an independent suspension on the front and twist-beam type on the rear. The Ecotec engine is widely used, as are 4- and 6-speed automatic and 5-speed manual transmissions.

== Delta ==
=== Applications ===
Former vehicles based on this platform:

- 2003–2007 Saturn Ion
- 2005–2010 Chevrolet Cobalt
- 2005–2009 Pontiac G5/G4/Pursuit
- 2006–2011 Chevrolet HHR
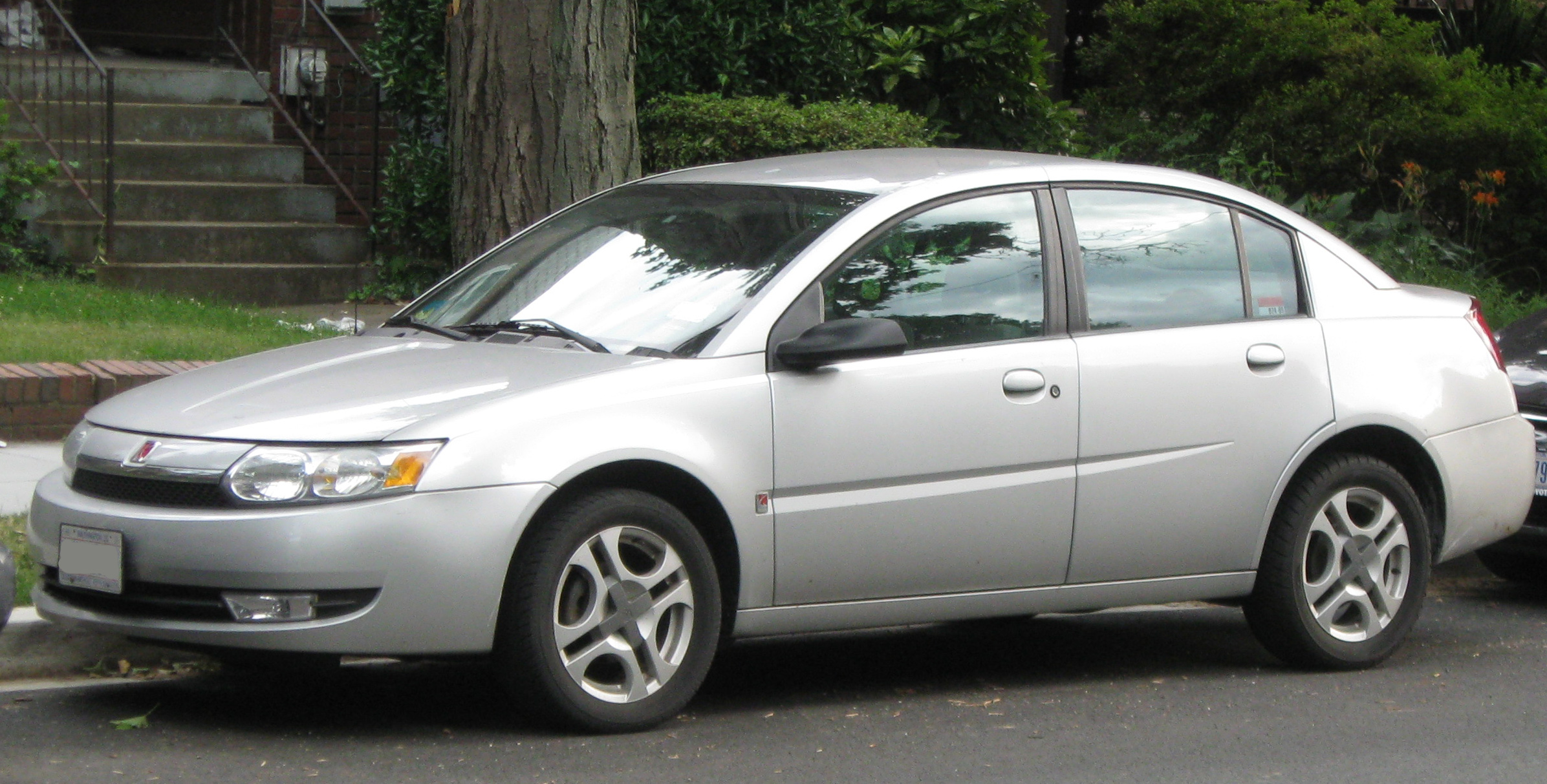
Saturn Ion

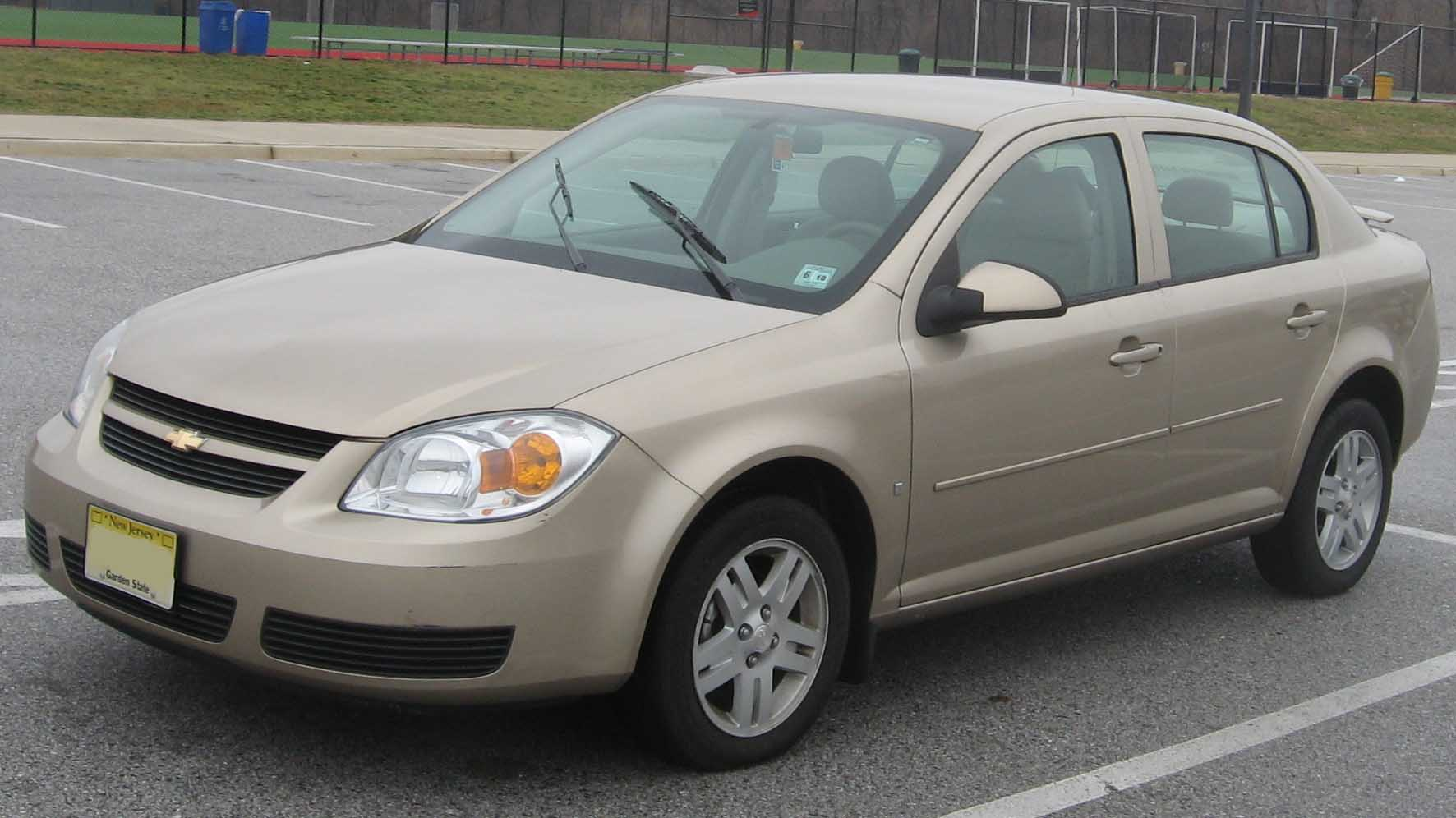
Chevrolet Cobalt

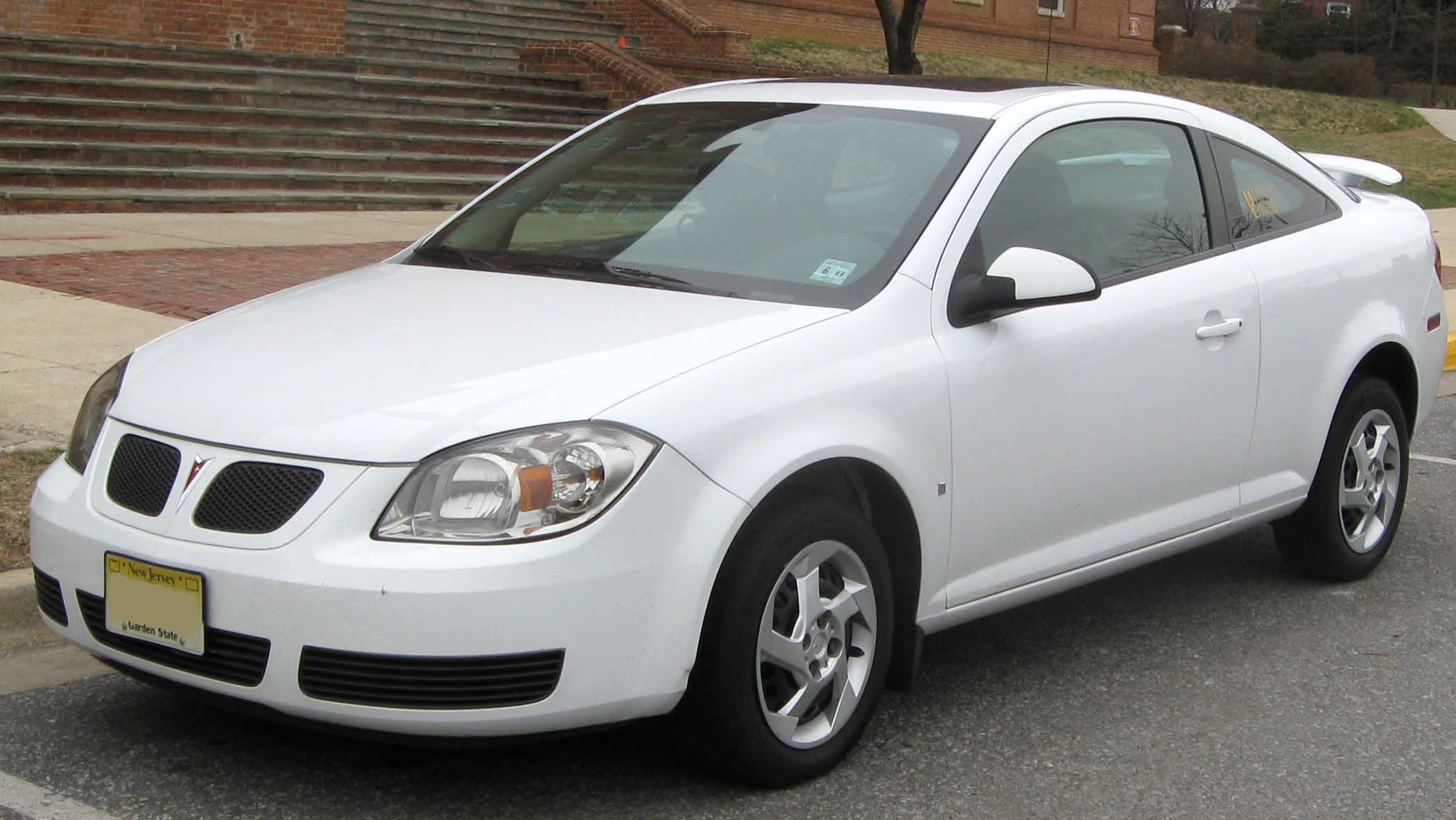
Pontiac G5/G4/Pursuit coupe

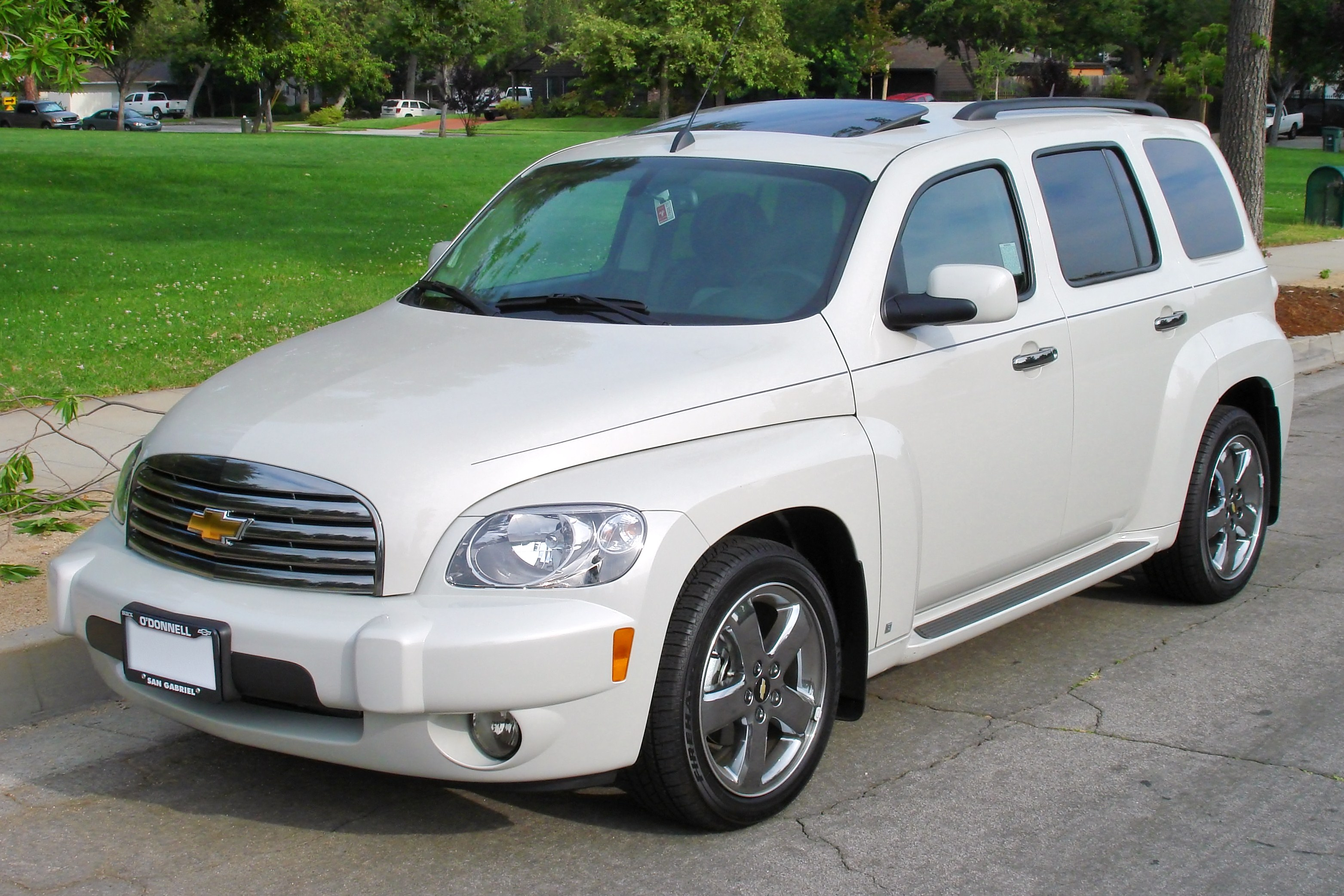
Chevrolet HHR

== Delta II ==
Delta II was General Motors' global compact car platform, developed by Opel in Germany. It was the successor to the GM Delta platform. Internally, it is simply known as a new Global Compact Vehicle Architecture or GCV.

The platform features a torsion beam (marketed as compound crank) rear suspension with optional Watt's linkage which improves vehicle handling; such configuration is used with the Opel Astra, Buick Verano, Cadillac ELR, Opel Cascada, and higher trim-levels of the American-market Chevrolet Cruze.

This suspension is usually described as semi-independent, meaning that the two wheels can move relative to each other, but their motion is still somewhat inter-linked, to a greater extent than in a true independent rear suspension (IRS). This can mildly compromise the handling and ride quality of the vehicle. For this reason, some manufacturers have changed to different linkage designs. As an example, Volkswagen dropped the torsion beam in favour of a true IRS for the Volkswagen Golf Mk5, possibly in response to the Ford Focus's Control Blade rear suspension.

As noted, certain GM brands and models have continued to use the suspension setup, known variously as twist beam, torsion beam, or compound crank suspension. This is at a cost saving of €100 per car compared to multi-link rear suspension. The version used on the 2009–2015 Opel Astra and the 2011–2016 Buick Verano uses a Watt's linkage at a cost of €20 to address the drawbacks and provide a competitive and cost-effective rear suspension. The Renault Mégane and Citroen C4 also have stayed with the twist beam. The twist beam has been shown to suffer less from bushing wear than a fully independent multi-link suspension, thus resulting in a virtually maintenance-free rear suspension.

GM chose this compact vehicle architecture for its first Voltec application, the Chevrolet Volt. Production began in November 2010 with the first examples delivered to retail customers in December 2010.

=== Applications ===
Production vehicles based on Delta II platform:

- 2008–2016 Chevrolet Cruze, Daewoo Lacetti Premiere, Holden Cruze
- 2009–2015 Opel Astra J, Buick Excelle XT
- 2010–2015 Chevrolet Volt
- 2010–2018 Chevrolet Orlando
- 2011–2016 Buick Verano
- 2011–2015 Opel Ampera
- 2011–2019 Opel Zafira Tourer C
- 2013–2016 Cadillac ELR
- 2013–2019 Opel Cascada (also marketed as Vauxhall Cascada, Holden Cascada, Buick Cascada, and Opel Cabrio)
- 2017–2021 Chevrolet Cavalier
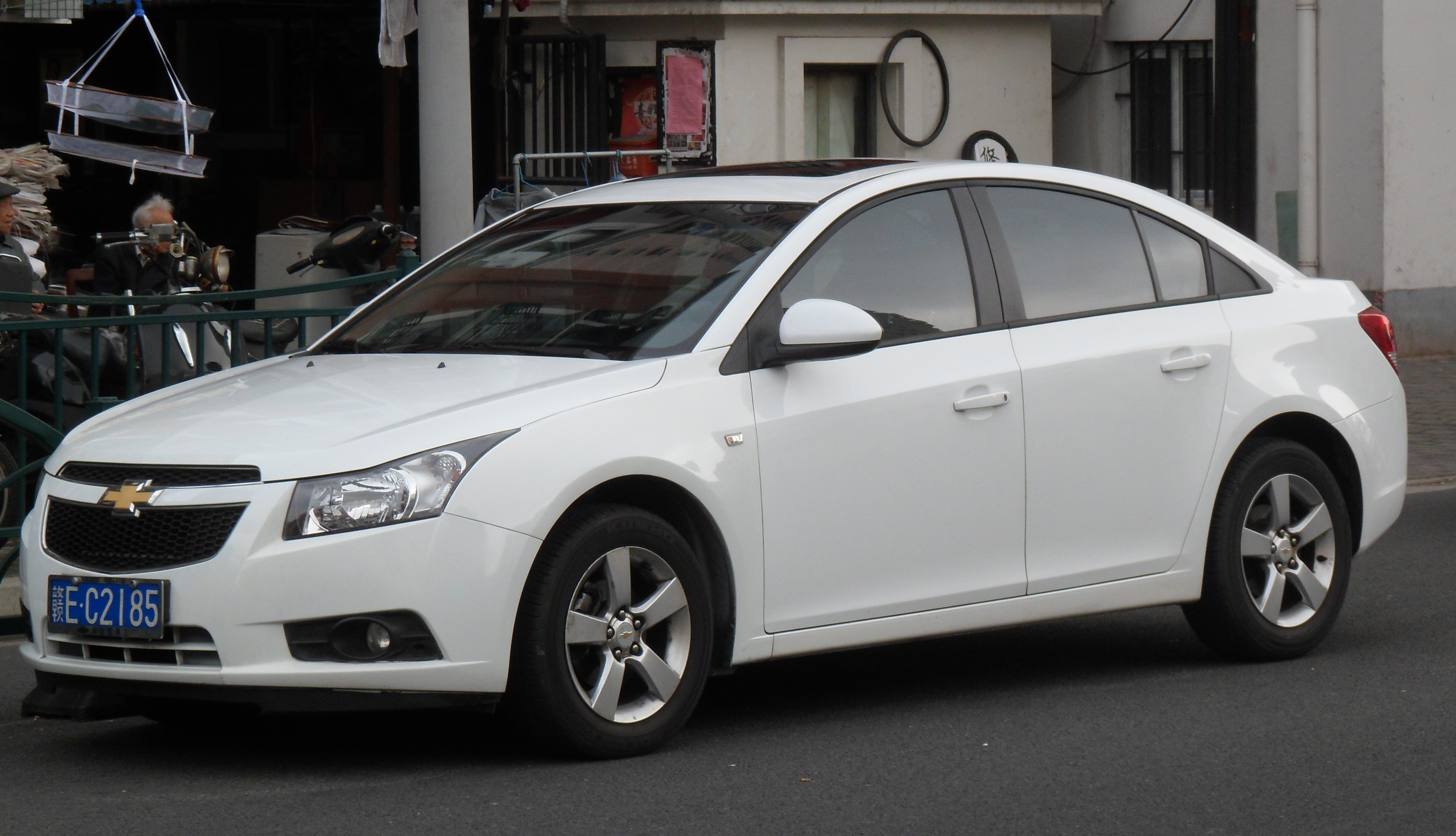
Chevrolet Cruze

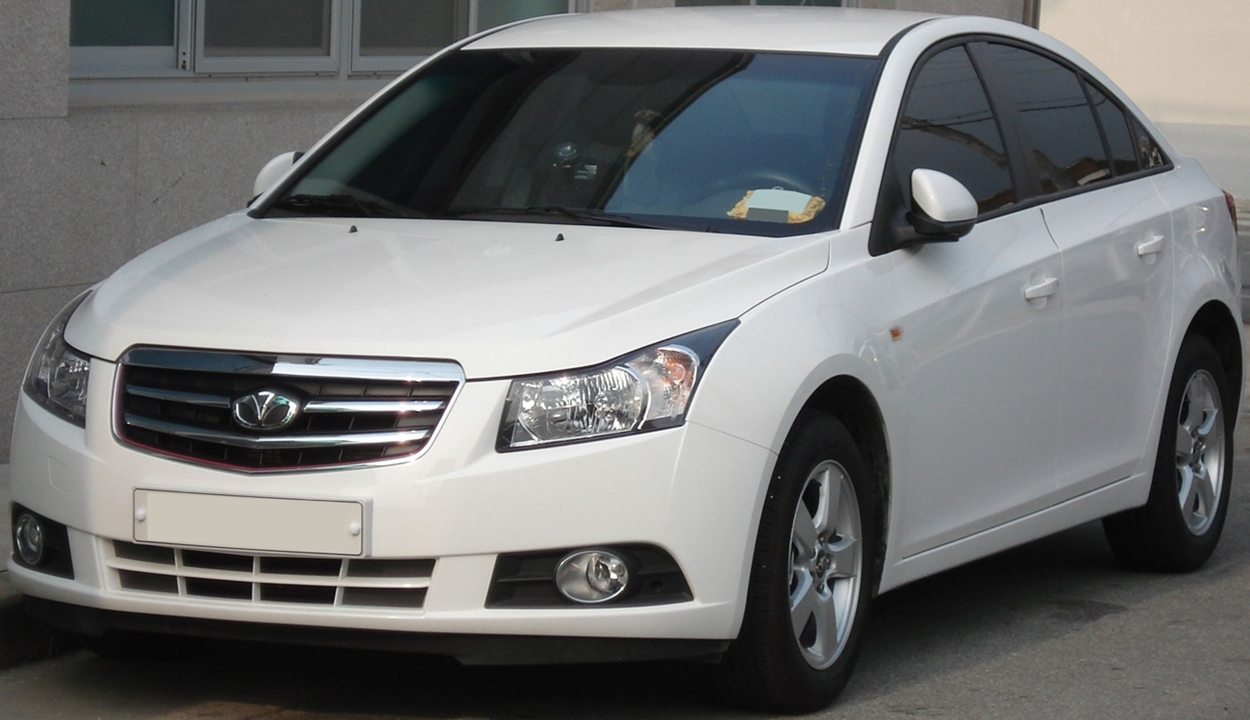
Daewoo Lacetti Premiere

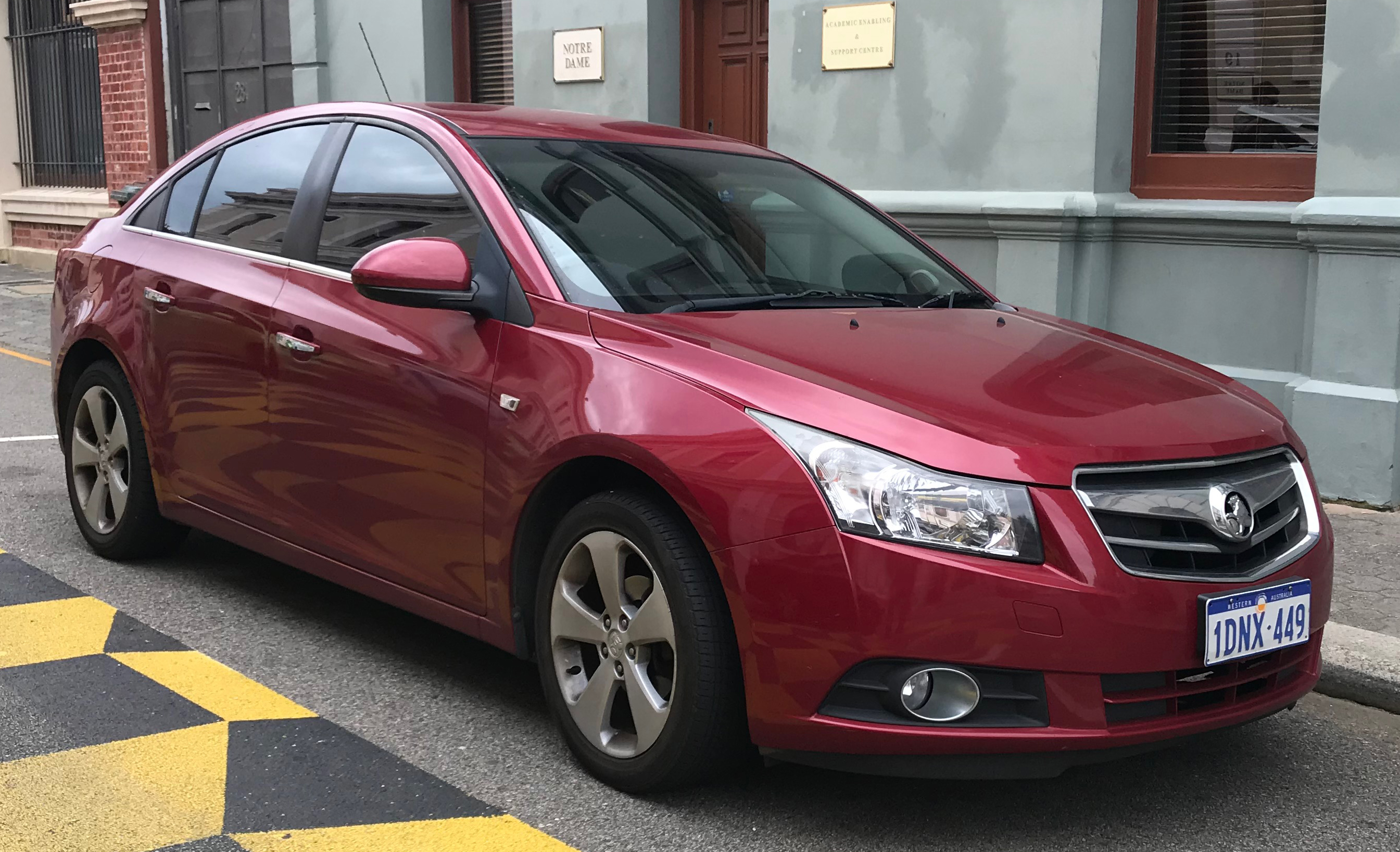
Holden Cruze

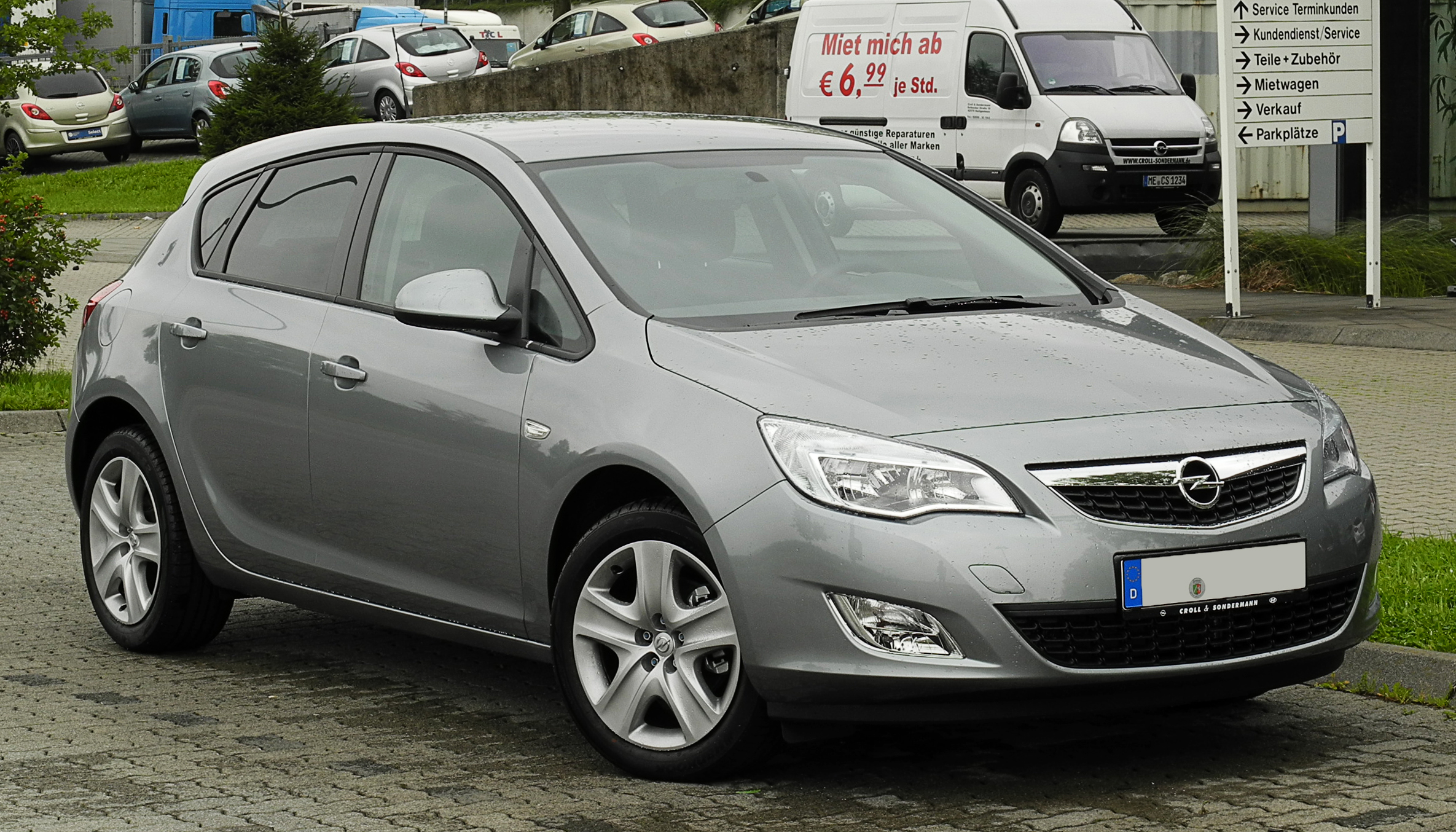
Opel Astra J

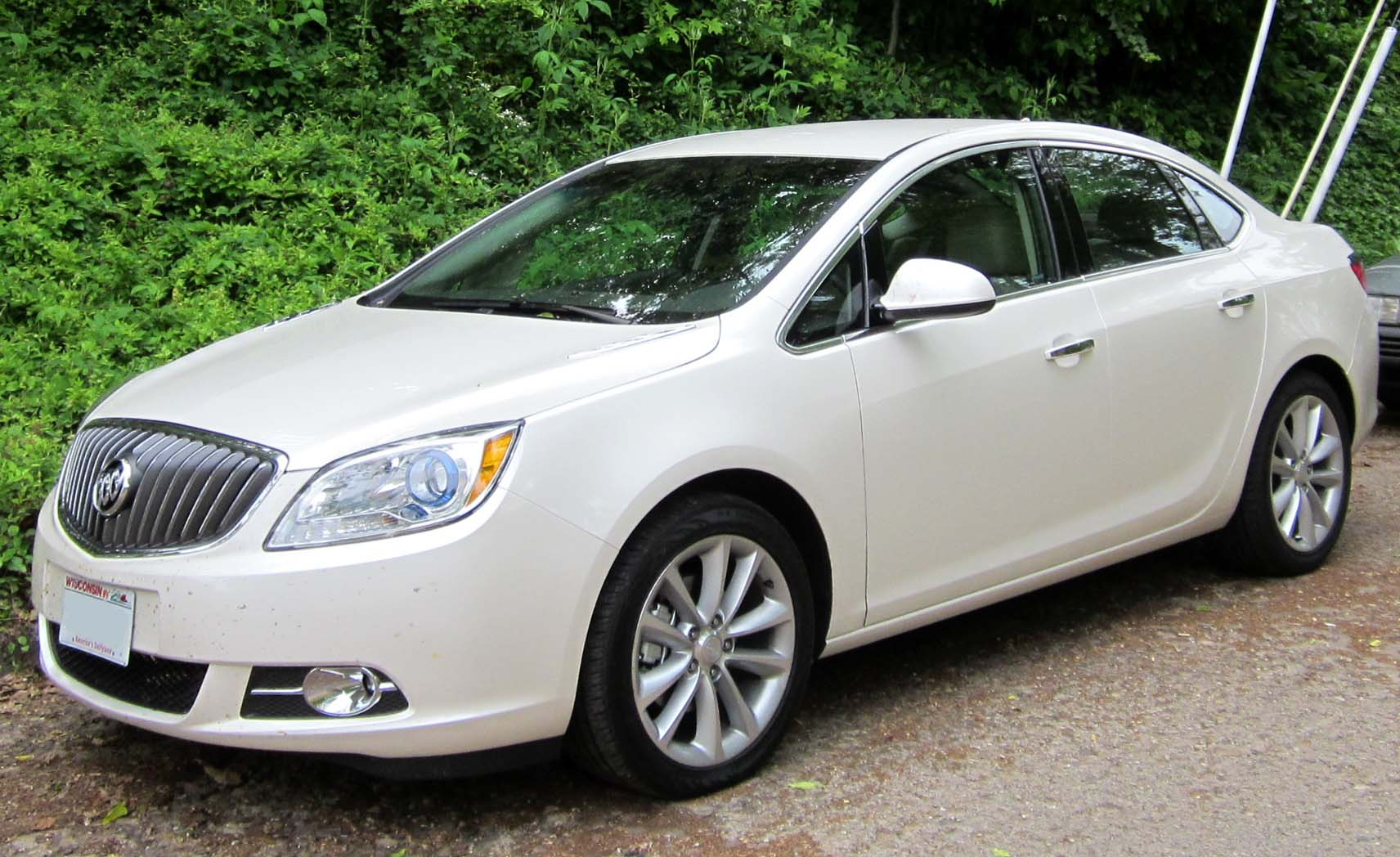
Buick Verano

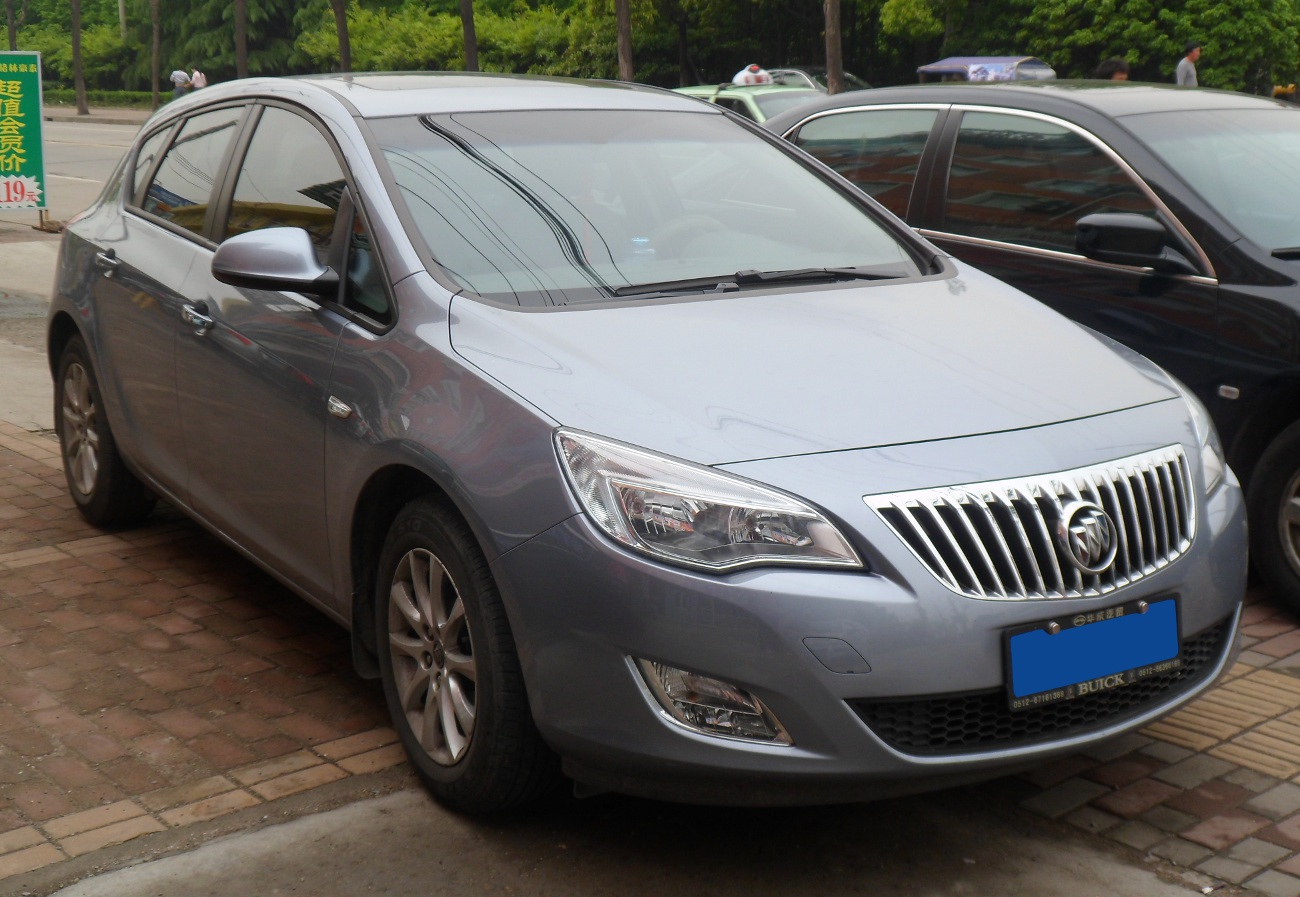
Buick Excelle XT

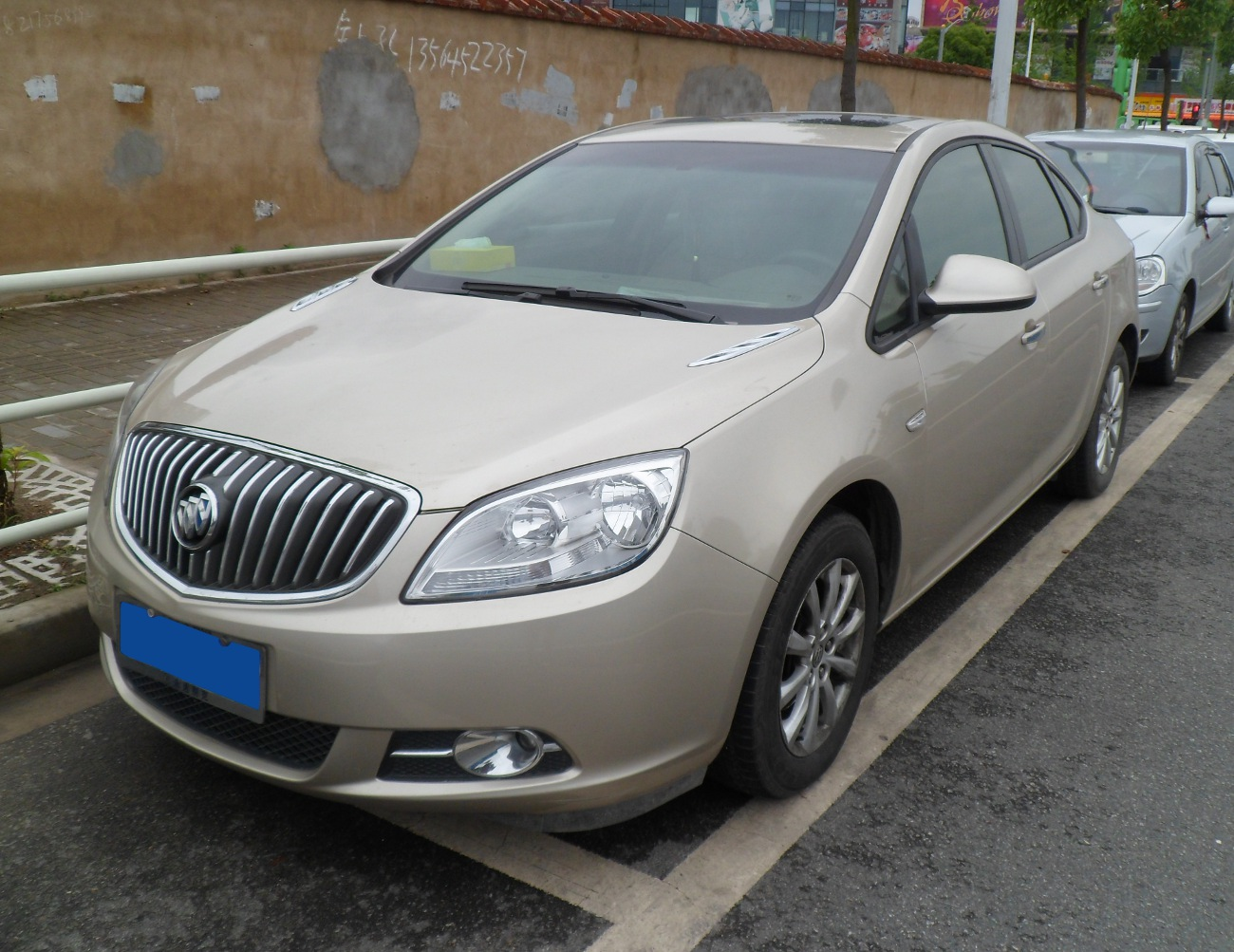
Buick Excelle GT

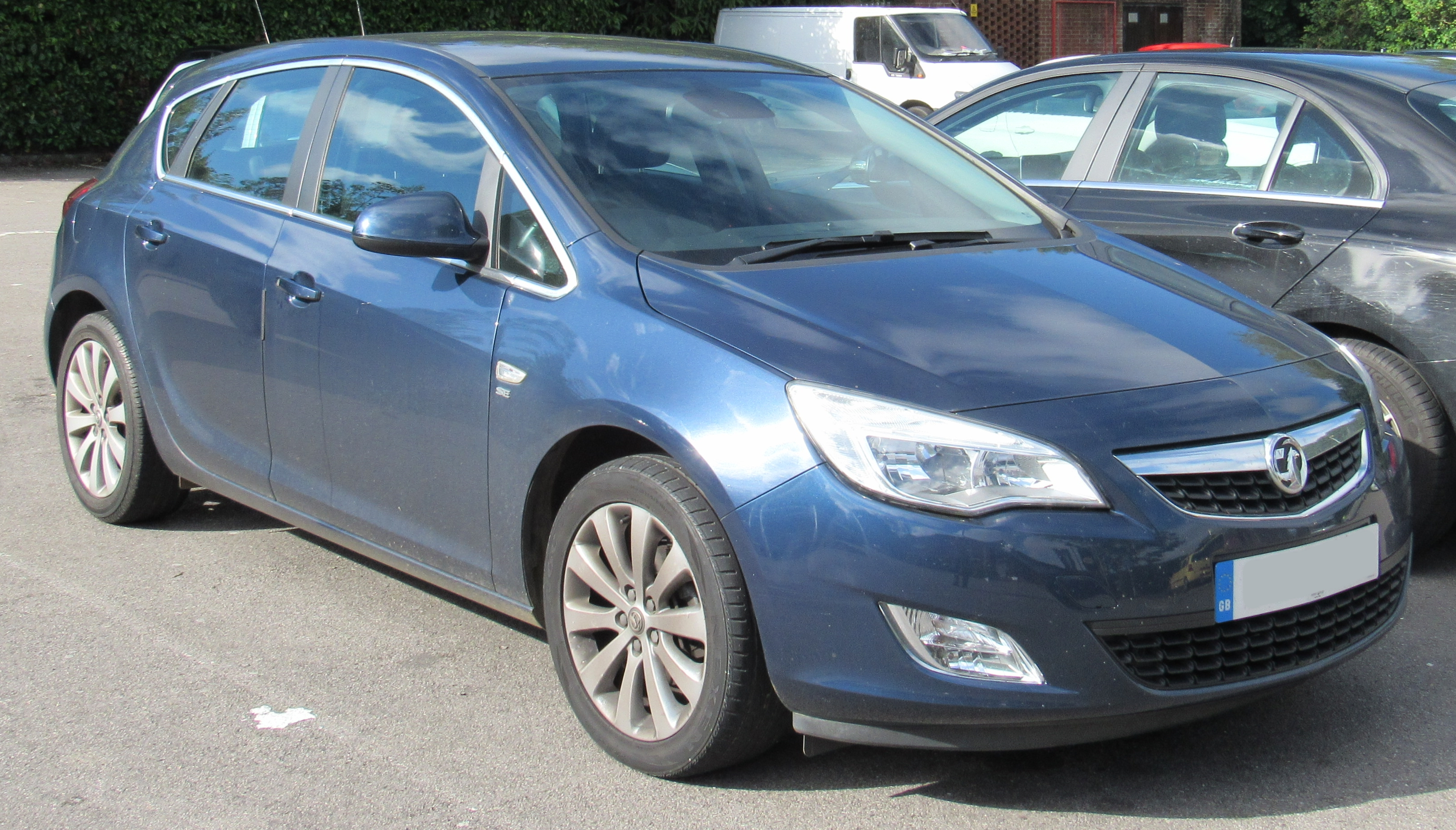
Vauxhall Astra Mk6

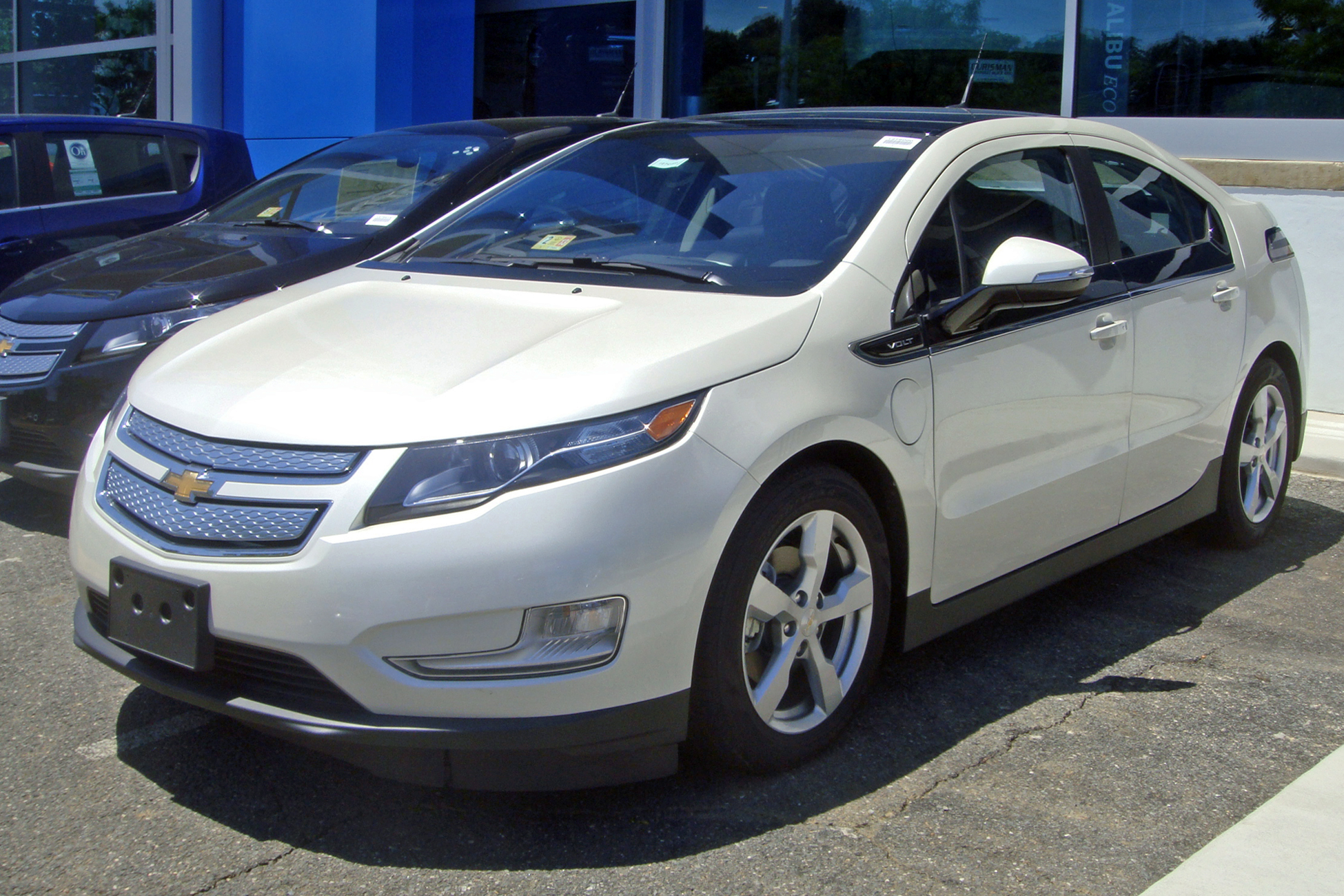
Chevrolet Volt (first generation)

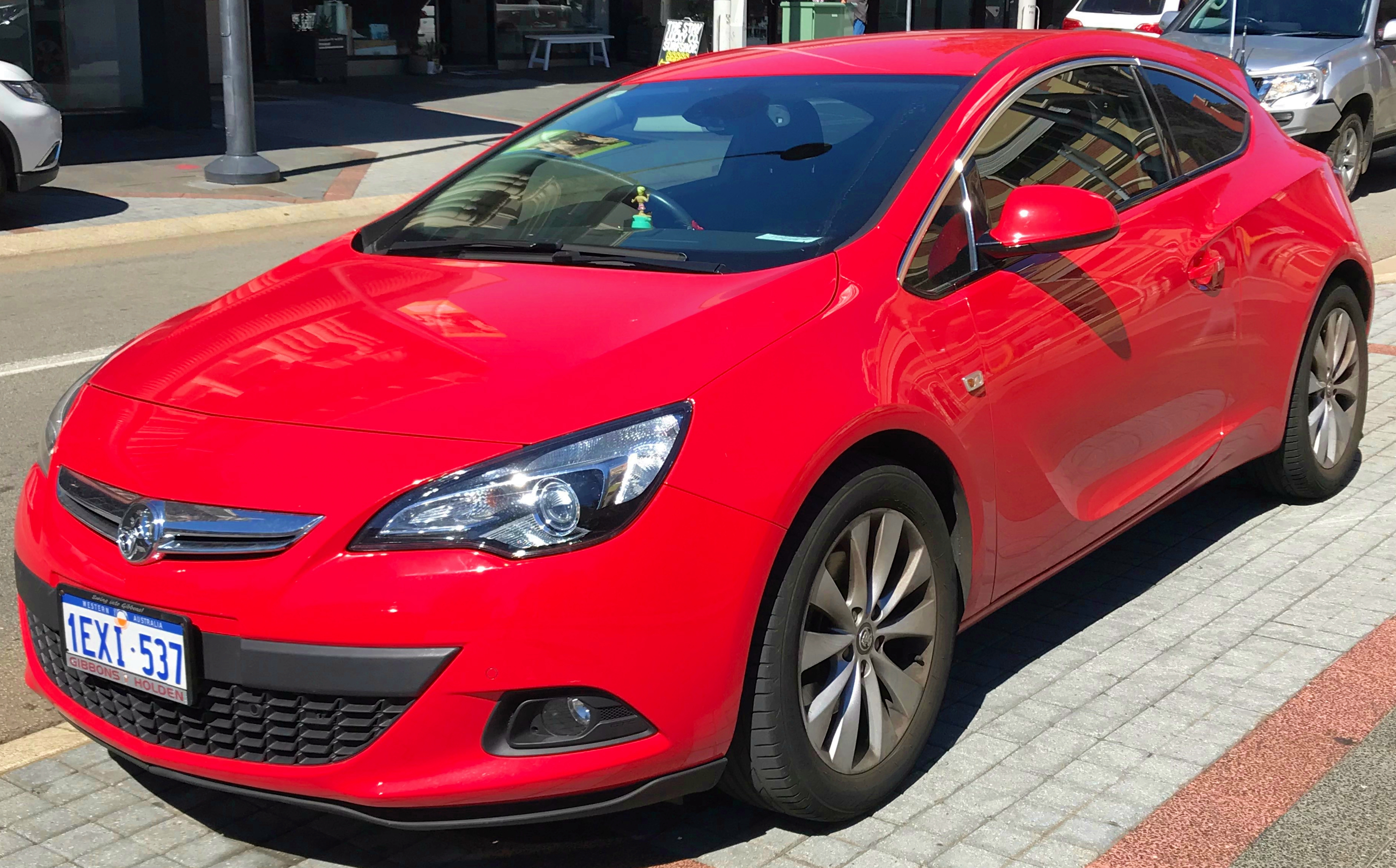
Holden Astra

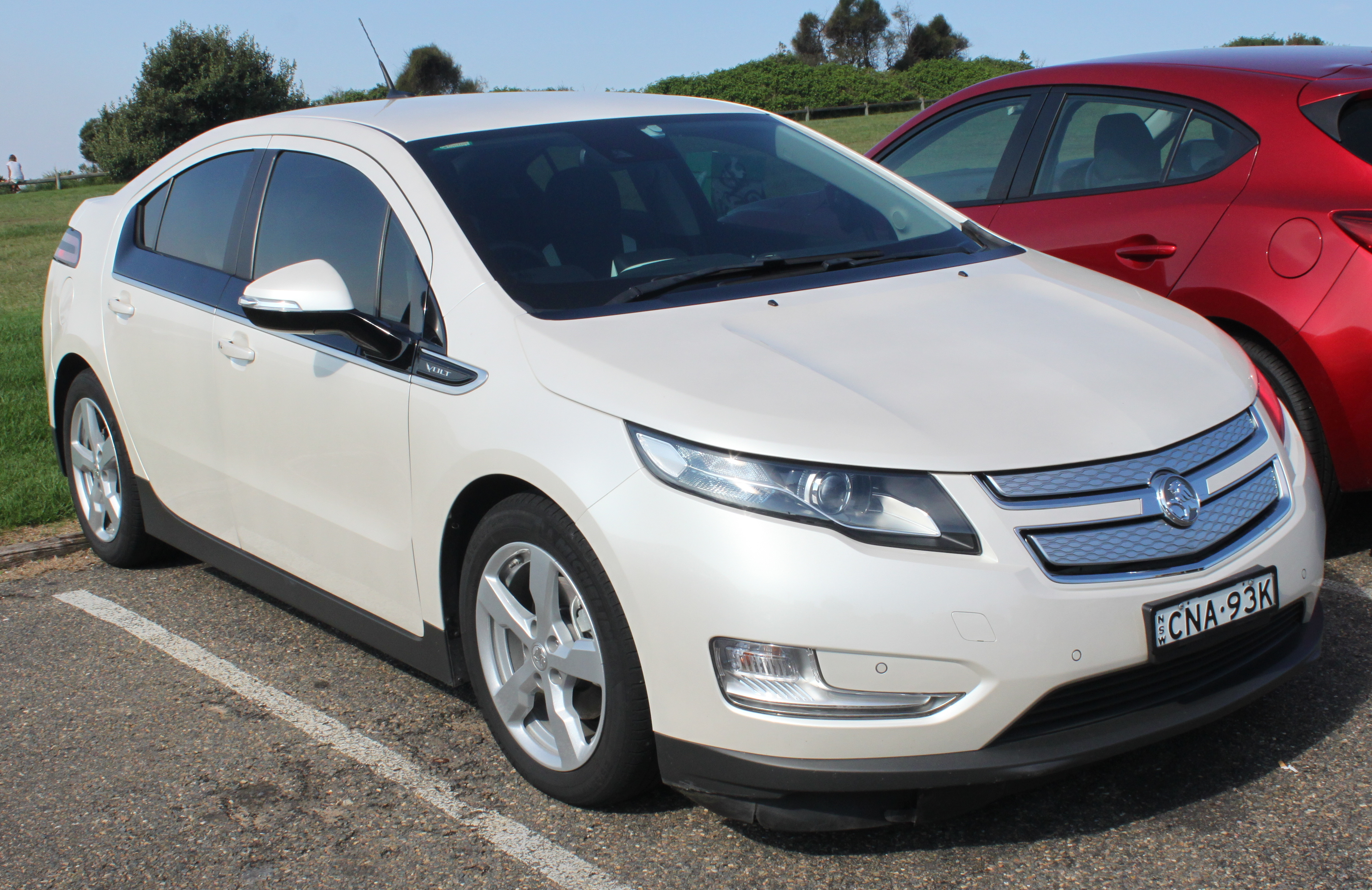
Holden Volt

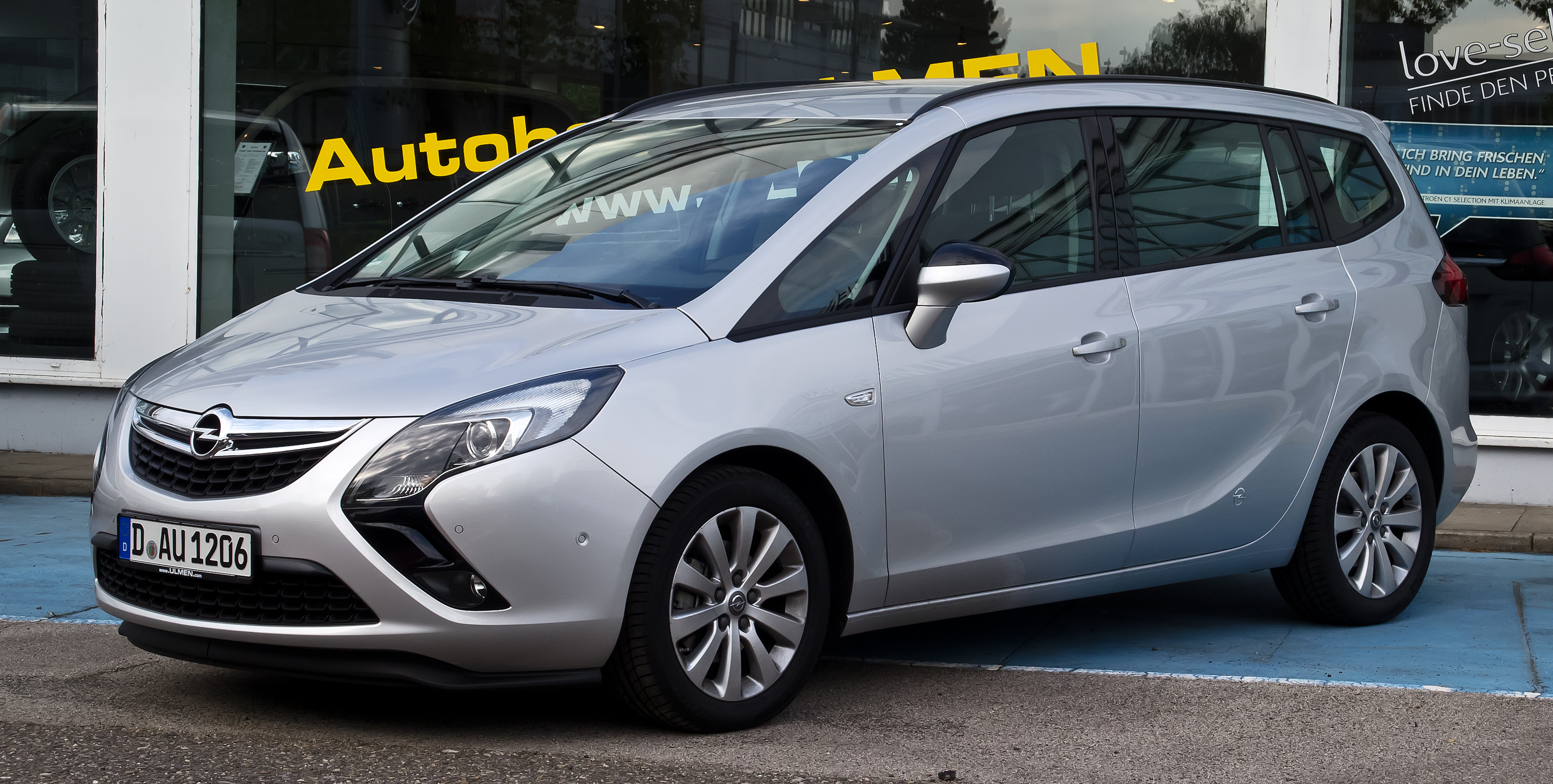
Opel Zafira C

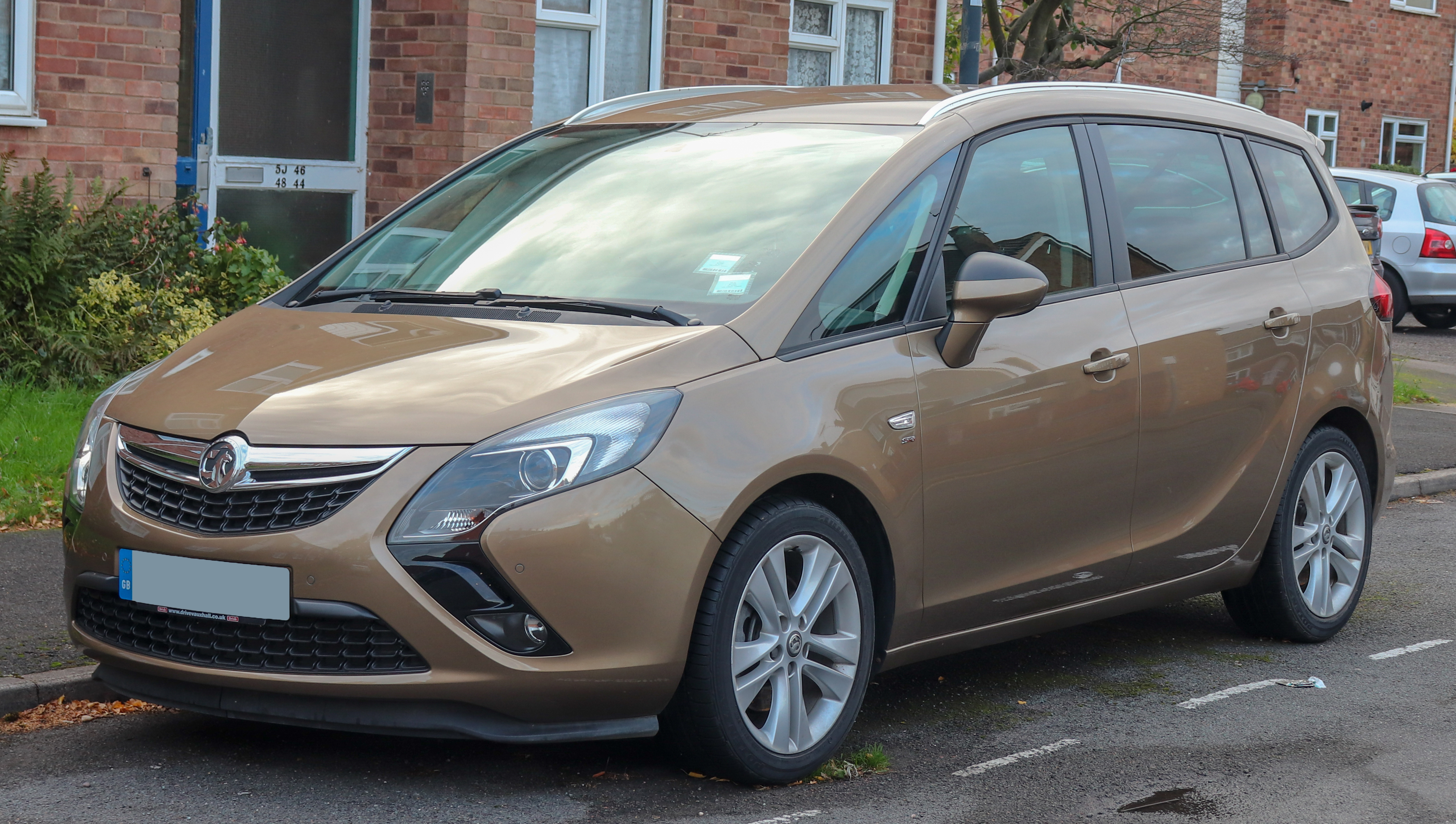
Vauxhall Zafira Mk3

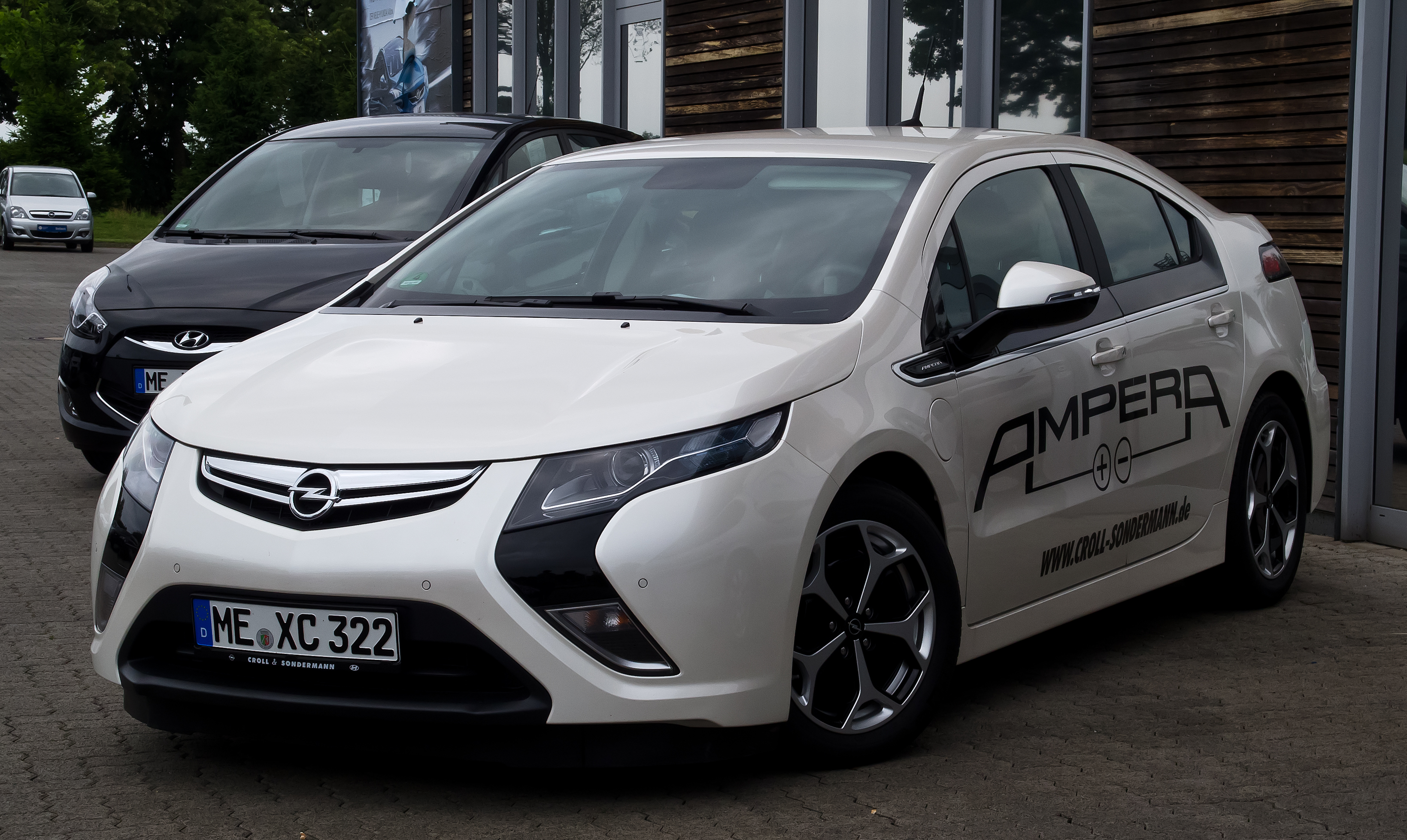
Opel Ampera

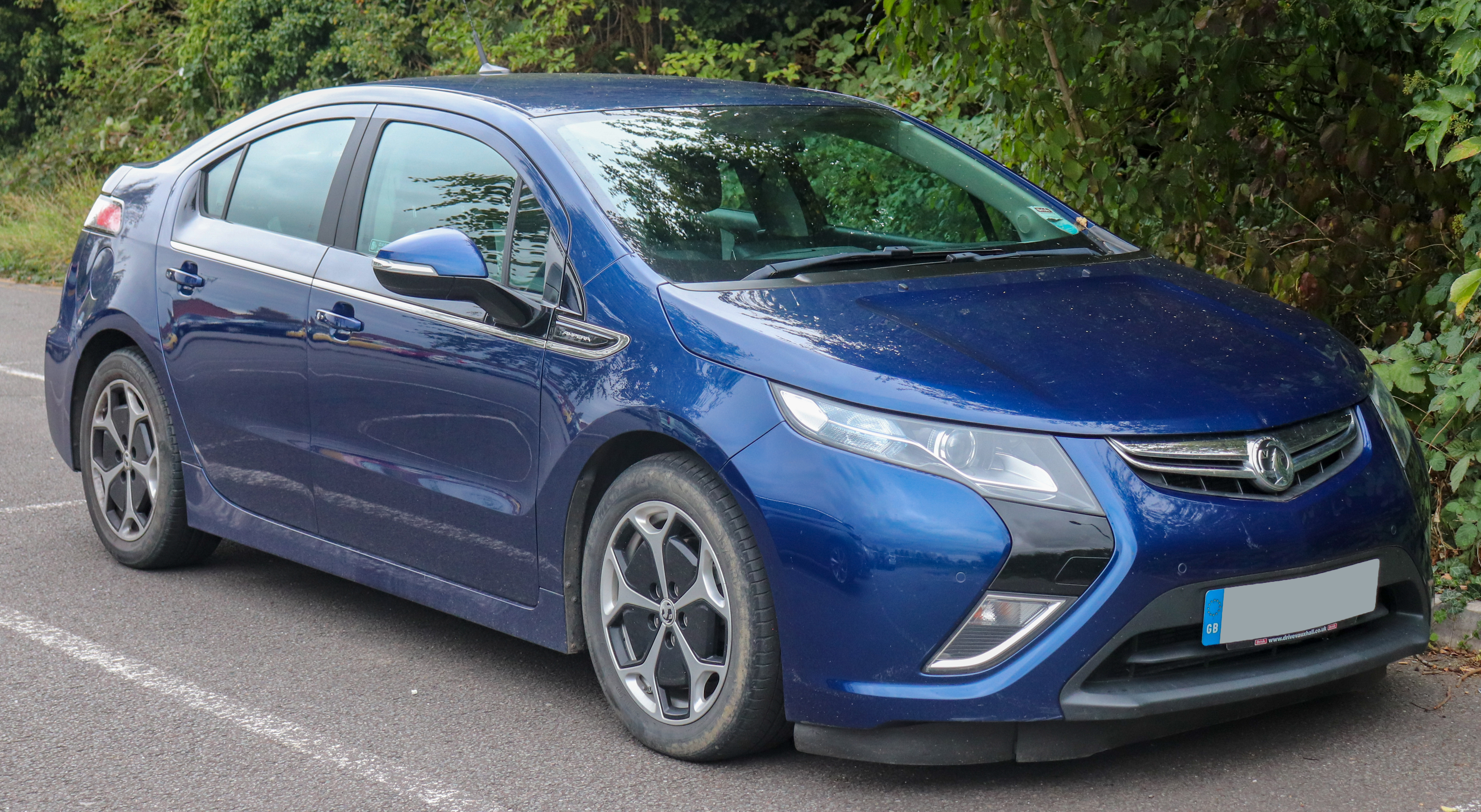
Vauxhall Ampera

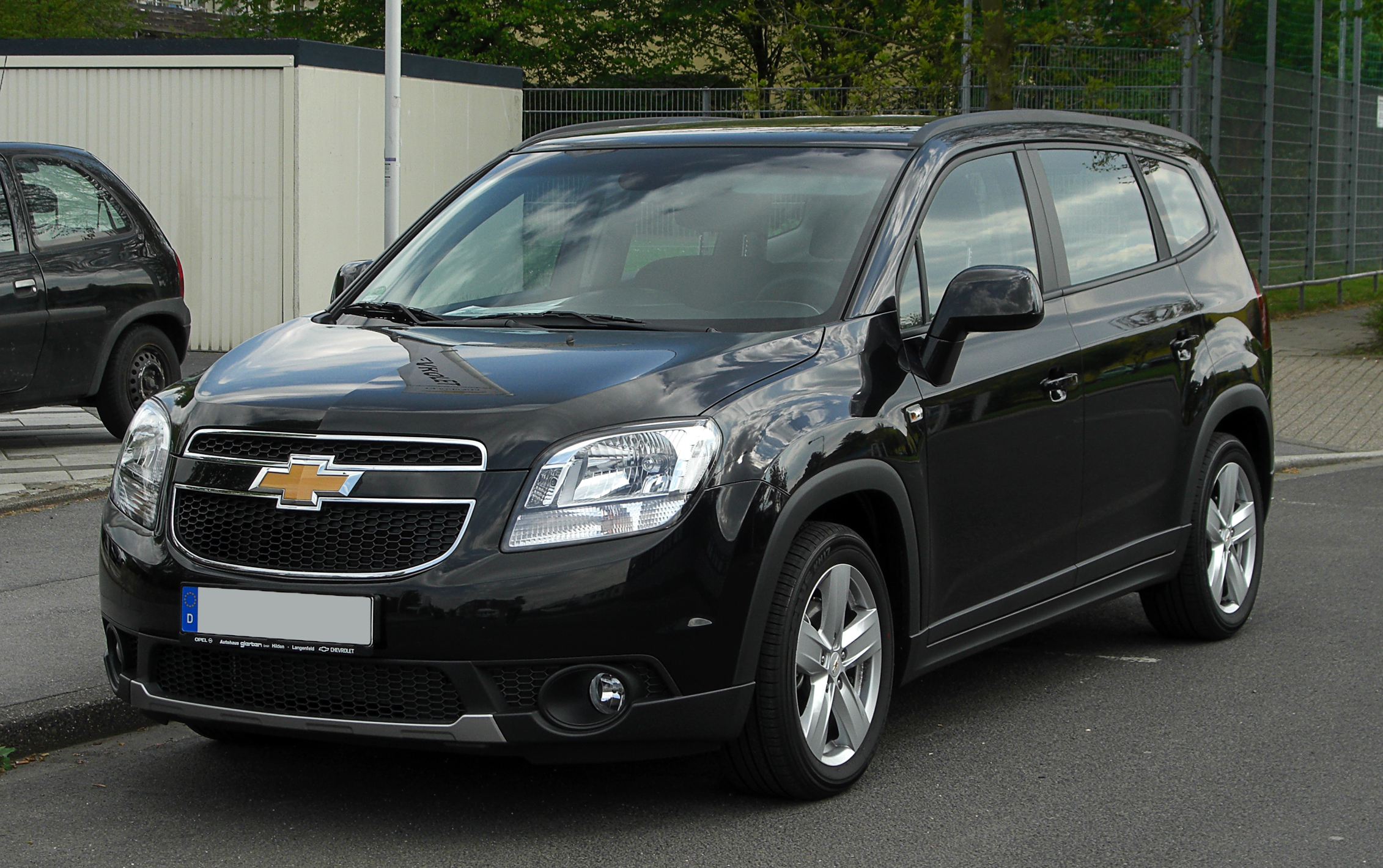
Chevrolet Orlando

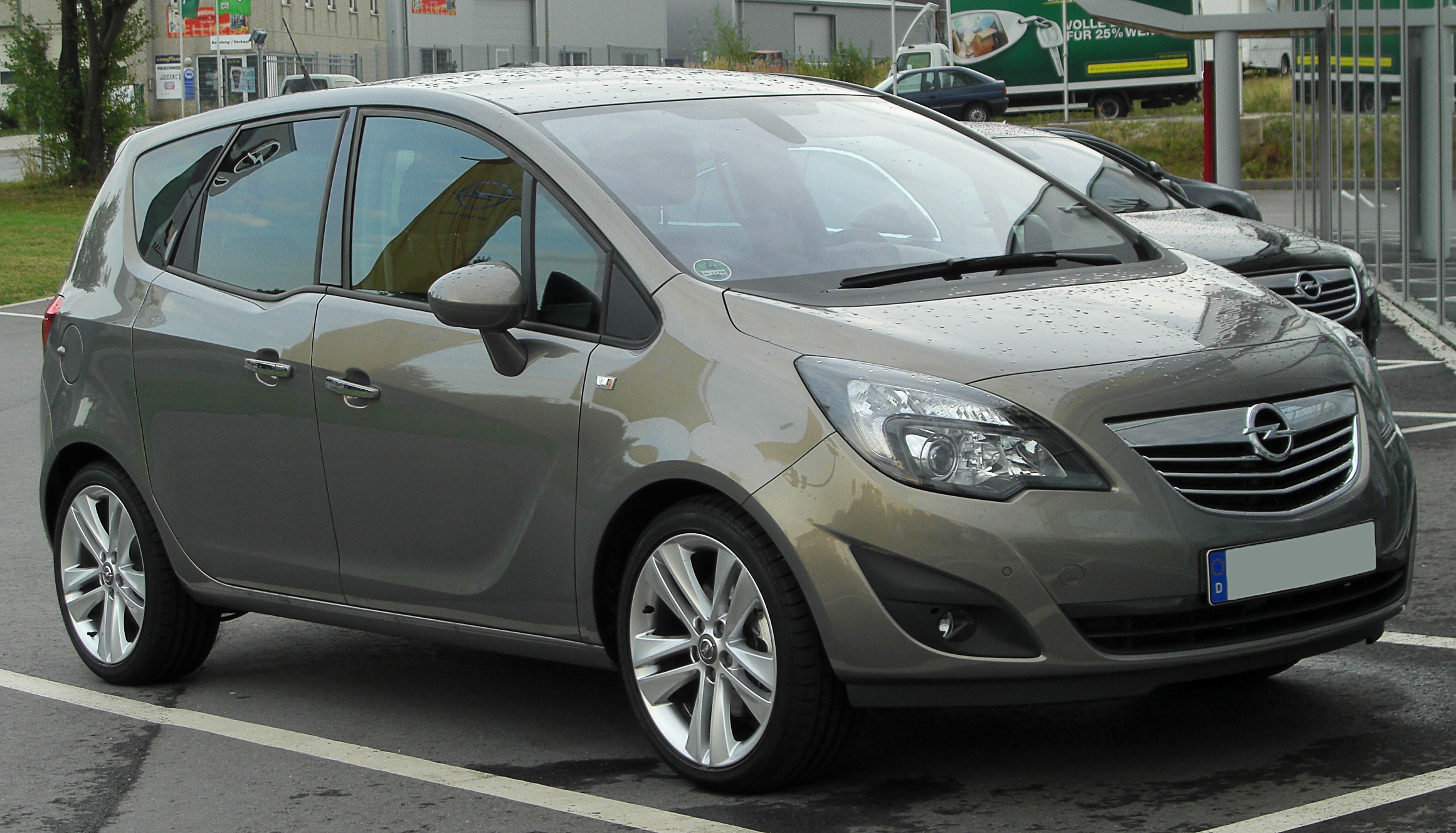
Opel Meriva B

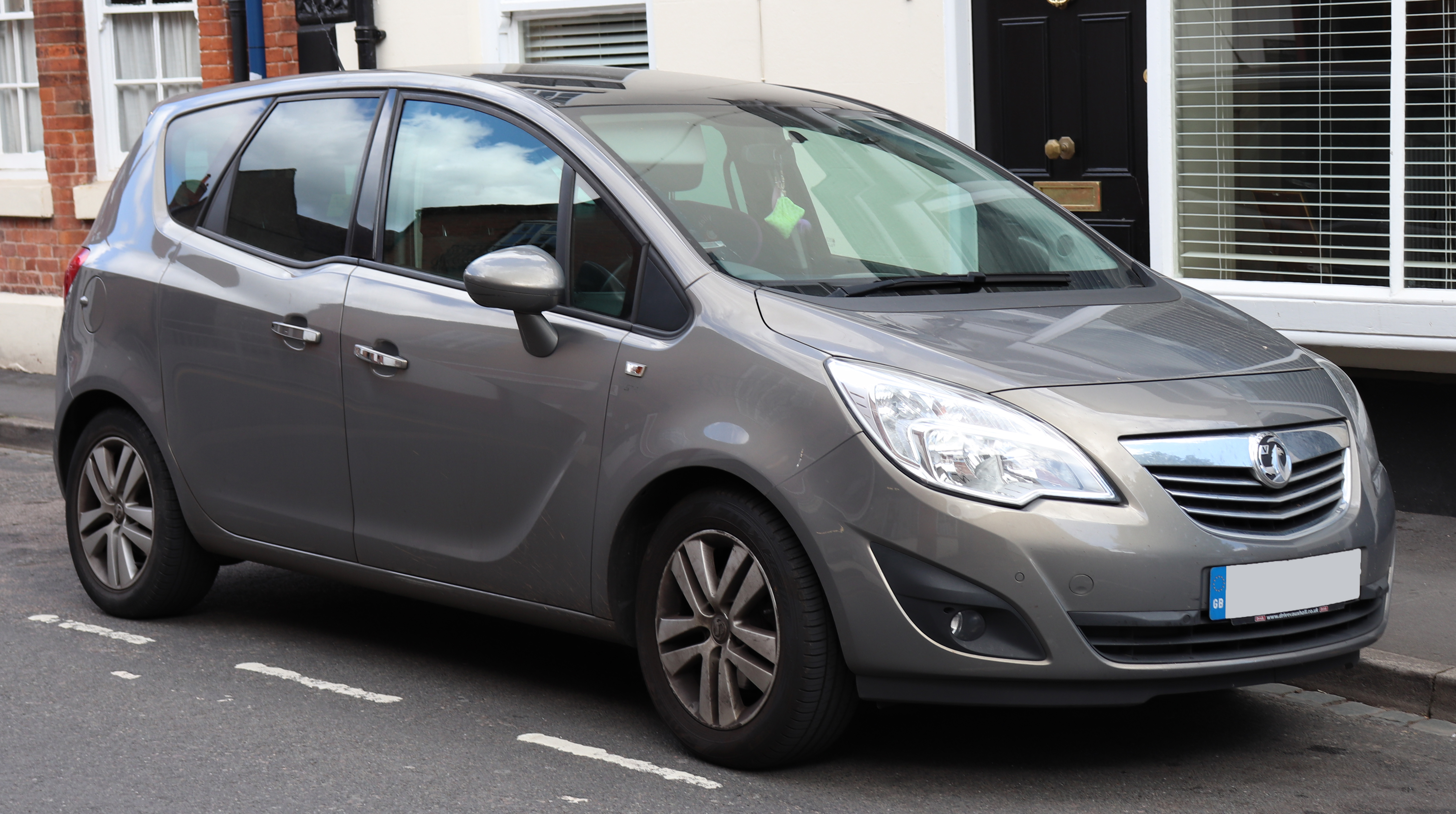
Vauxhall Meriva B

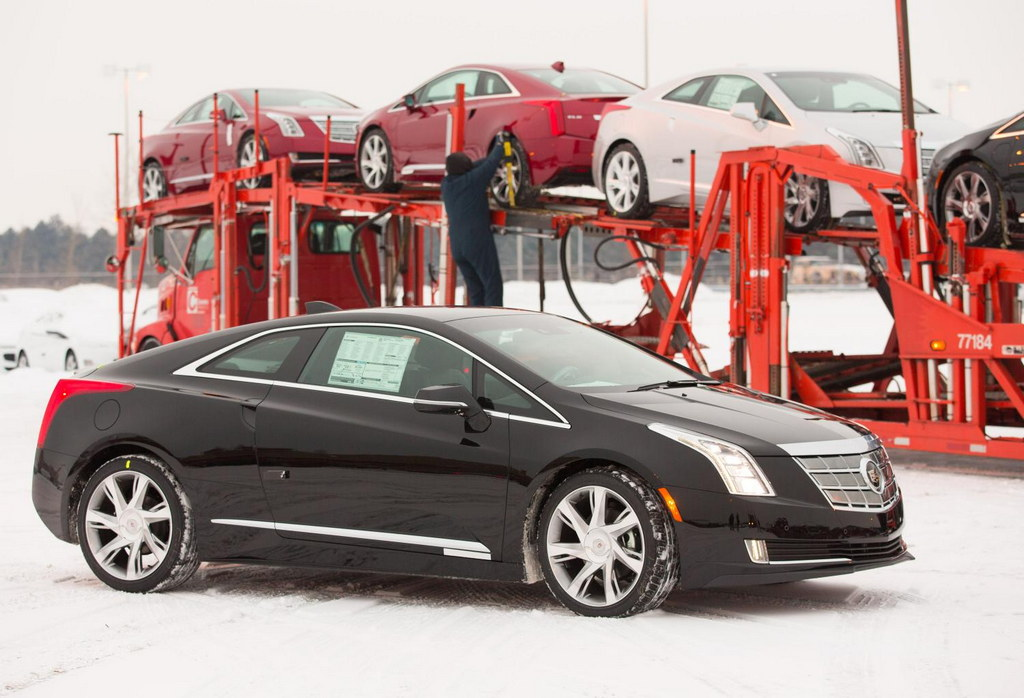
Cadillac ELR

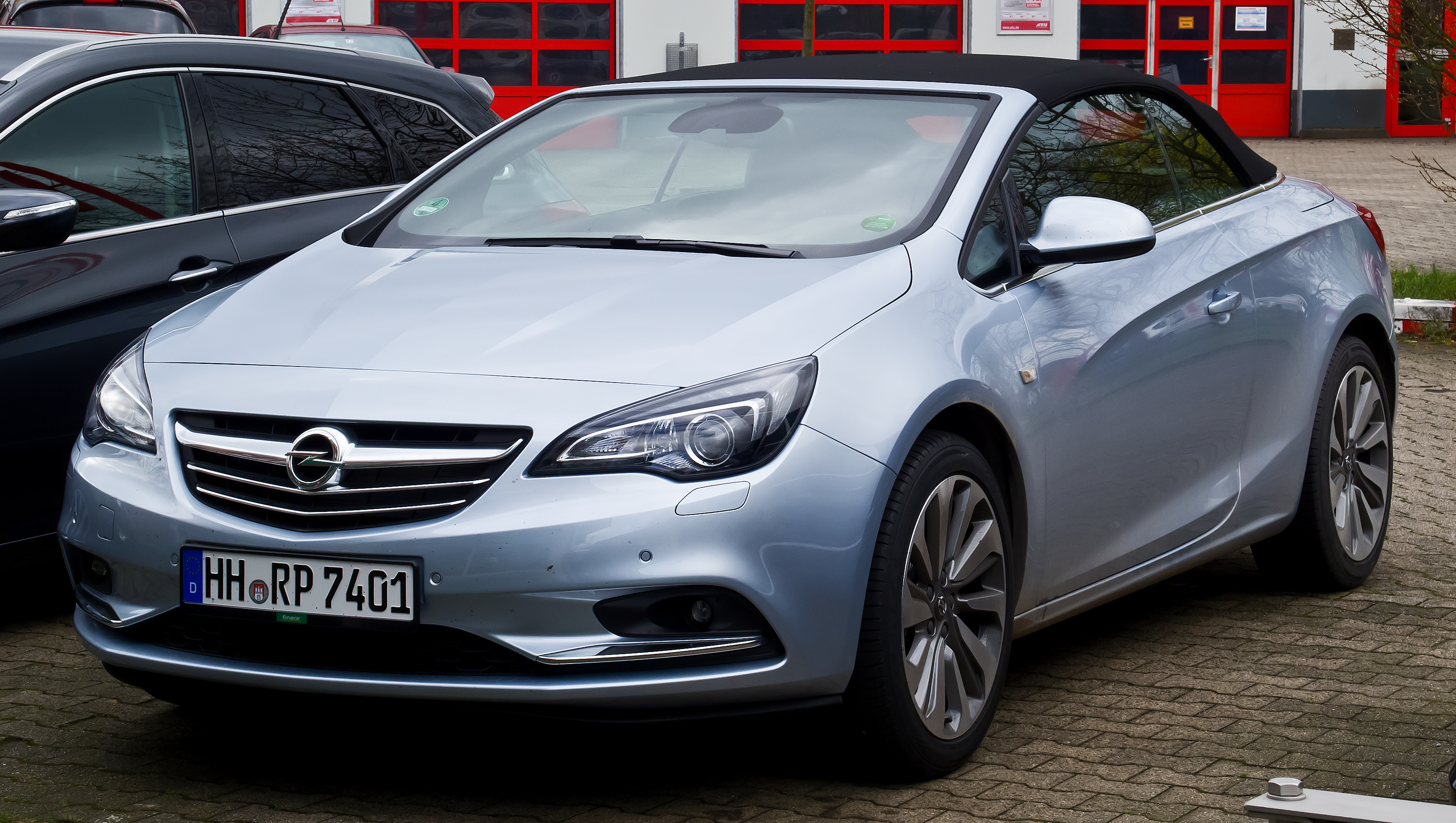
Opel Cascada

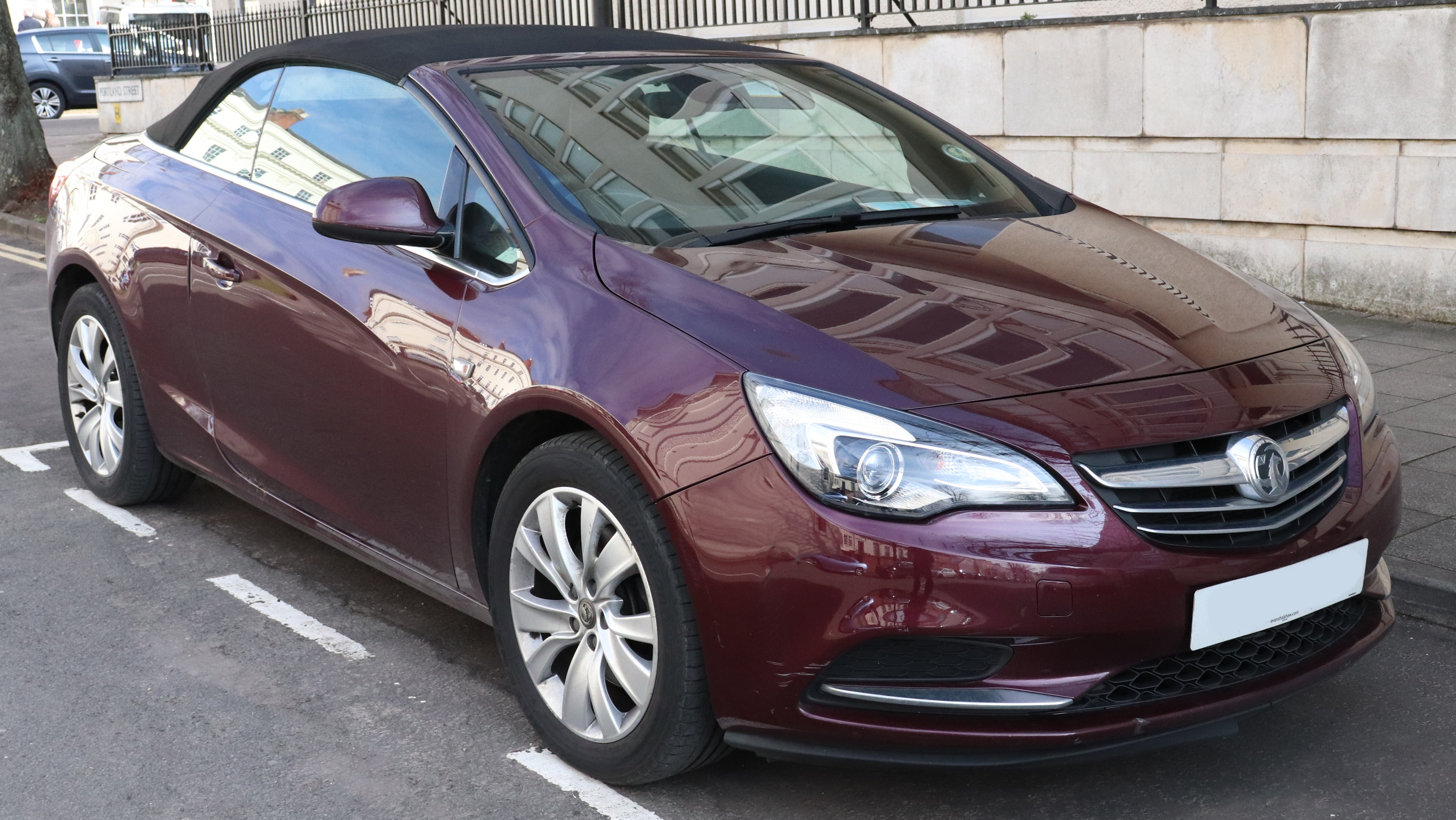
Vauxhall Cascada

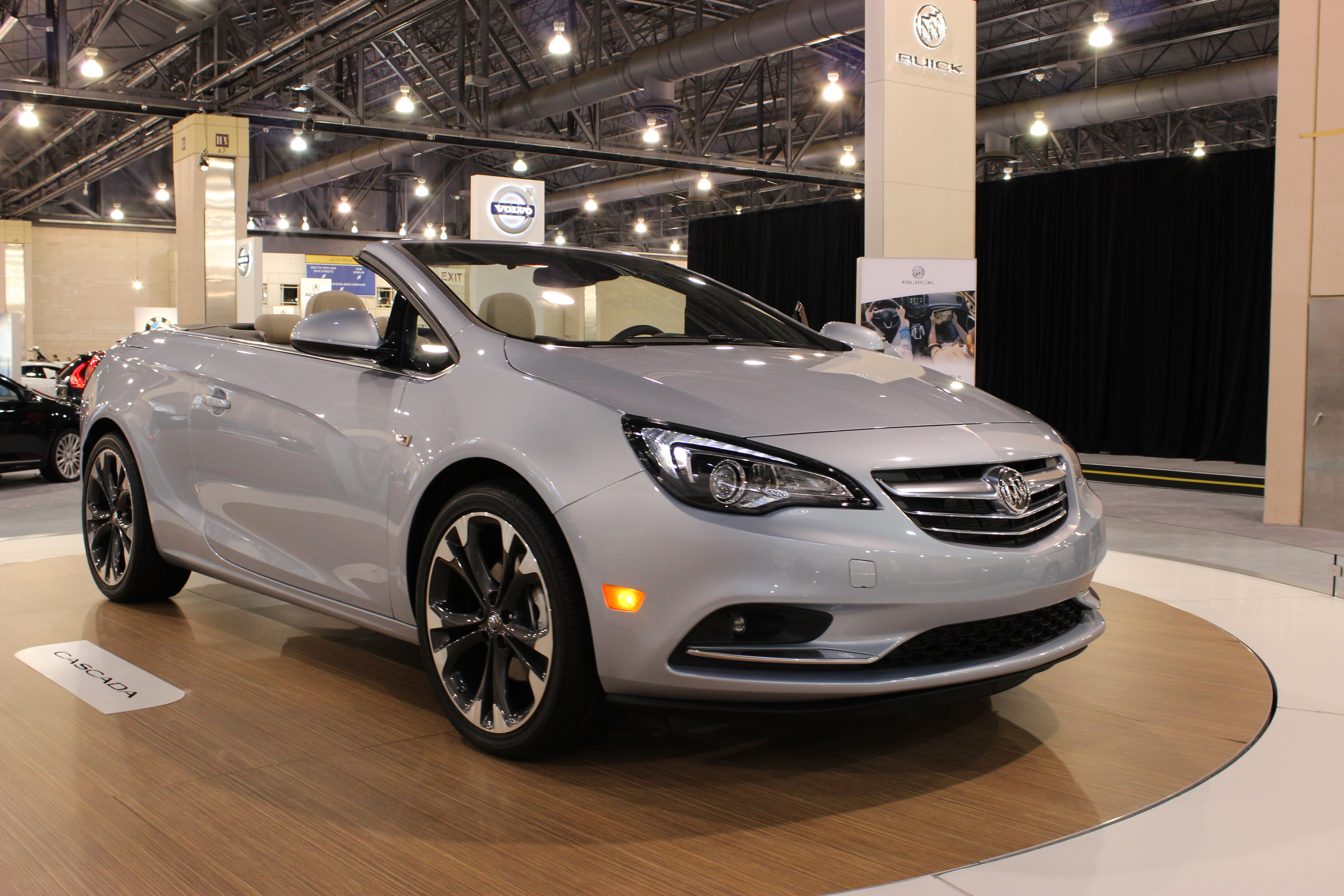
Buick Cascada

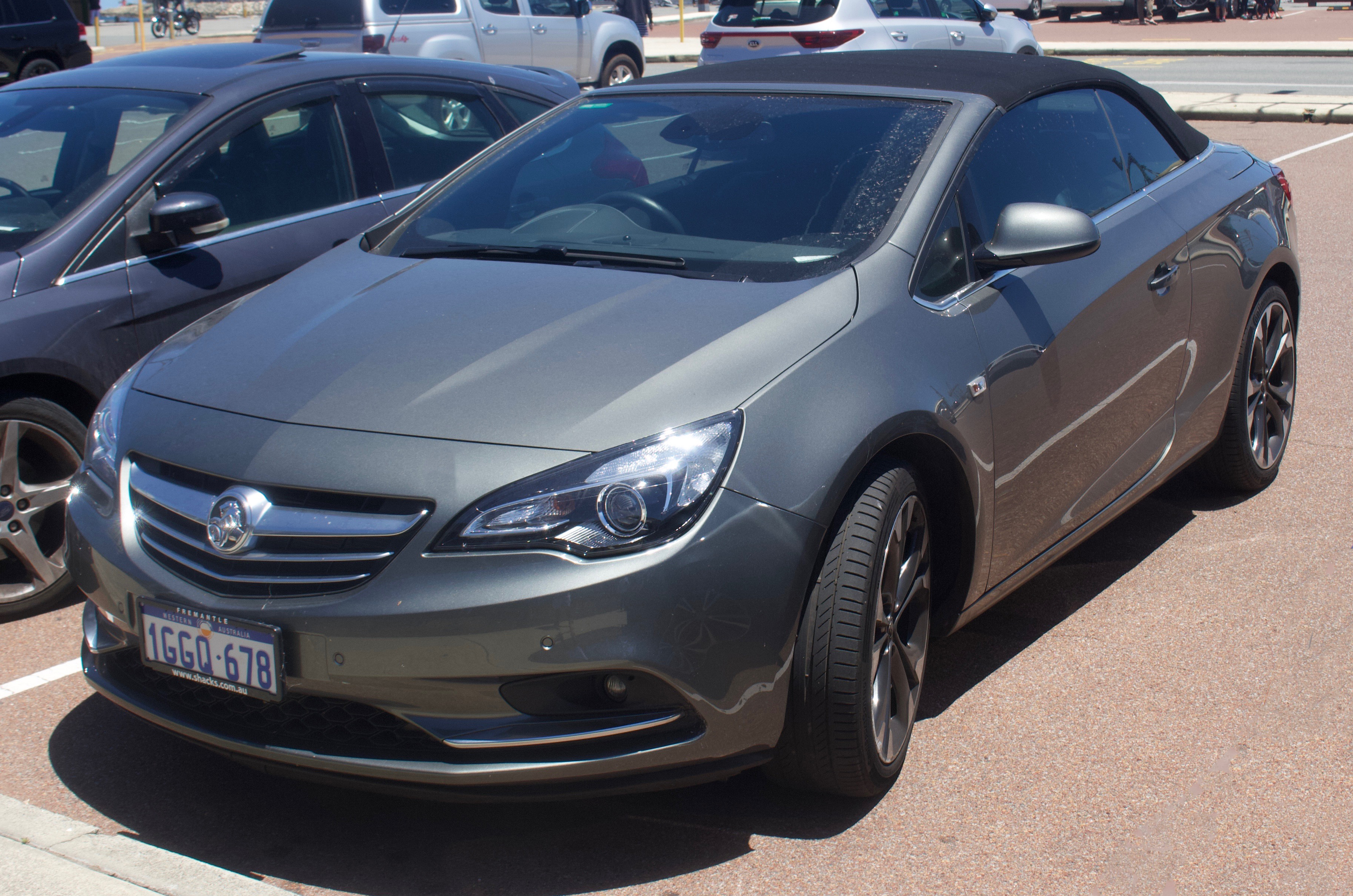
Holden Cascada

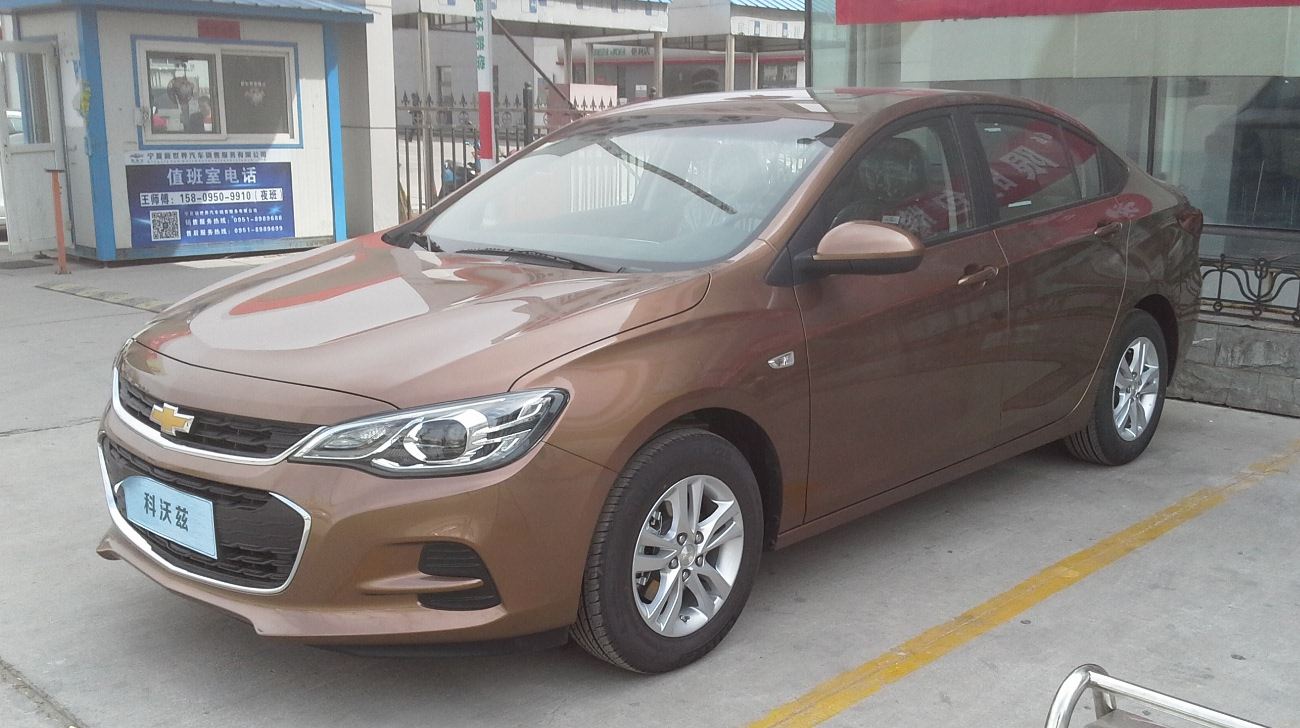
Chevrolet Cavalier

== D2XX/D2UX ==
General Motors introduced its new global platform named D2XX flexible platform in August 2012. The new platform was mainly engineered by GM's former German subsidiary Opel in Rüsselsheim. According to GM, the company invested US$220 million for the all-new D2XX platform.

The platform was developed for compact vehicle architecture, replacing both Delta II and the midsize crossover GM Theta platform.

Vehicles that use the new platform included:

- 2015–2023 Chevrolet Cruze
- 2015–2022 Opel Astra K
- 2016–2019 Chevrolet Volt
- 2018–2024 Chevrolet Equinox
- 2018–2024 GMC Terrain
- 2019–2023 Chevrolet Orlando
- 2014–2020 Buick Envision
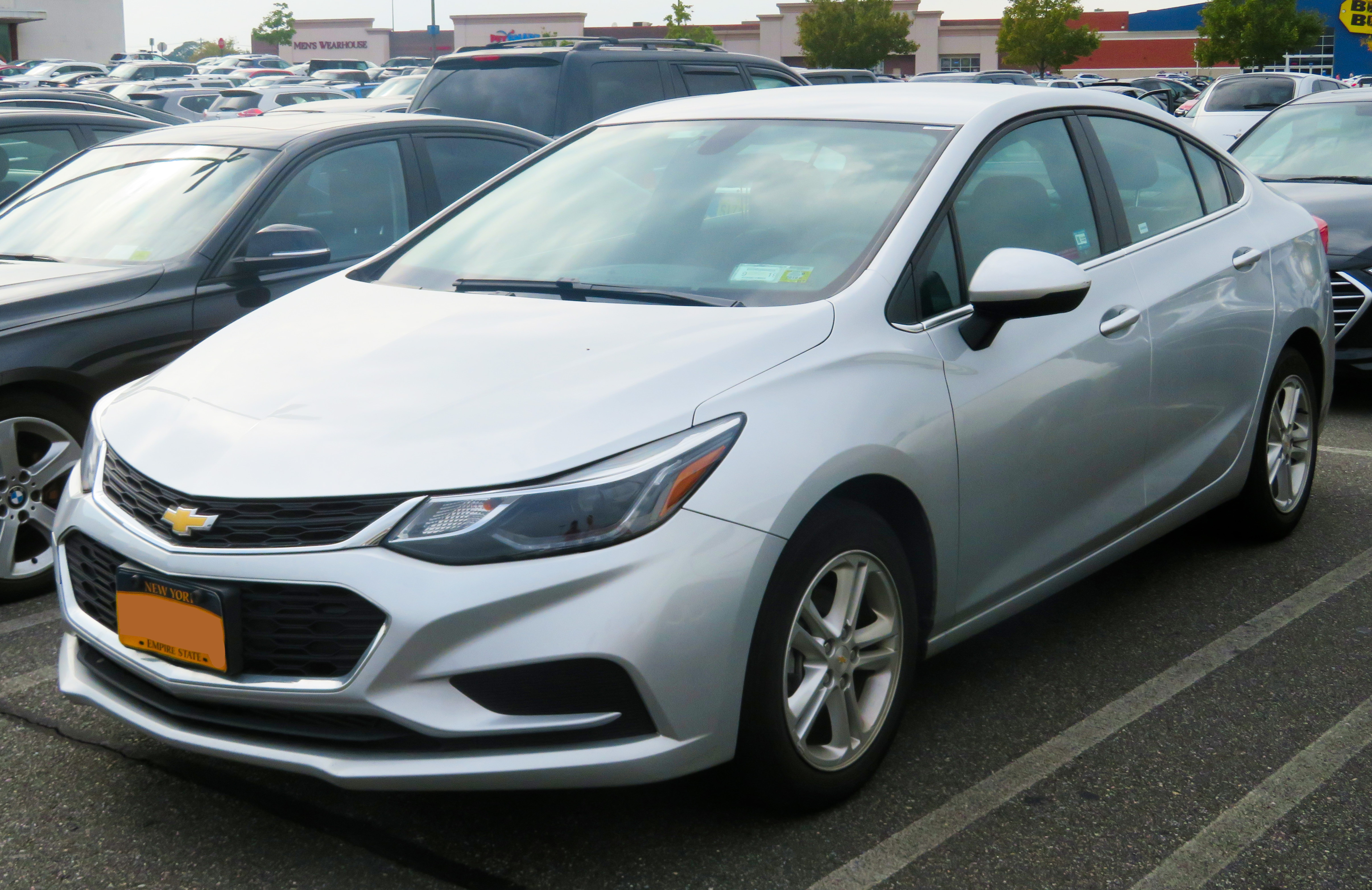
Chevrolet Cruze

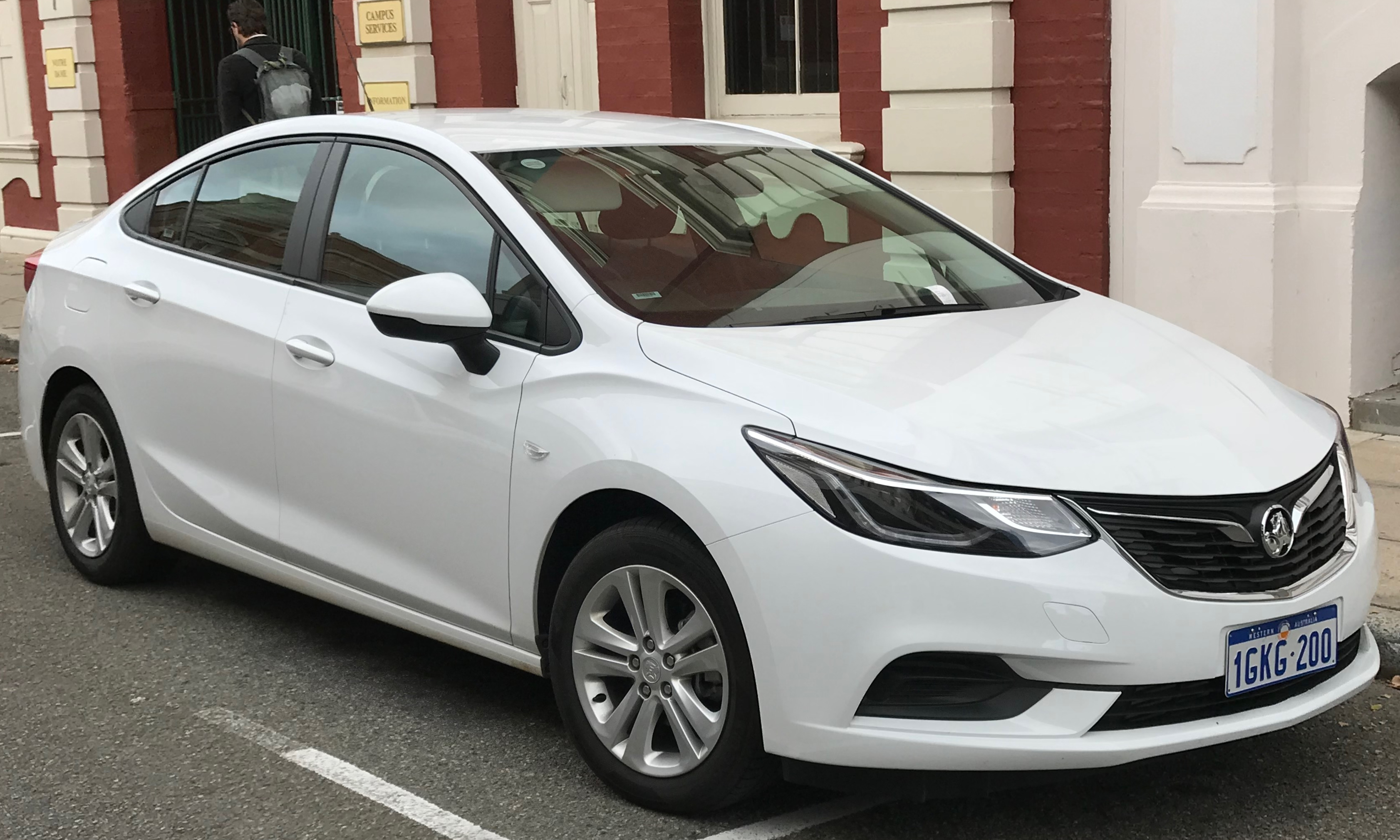
Holden Astra Sedan

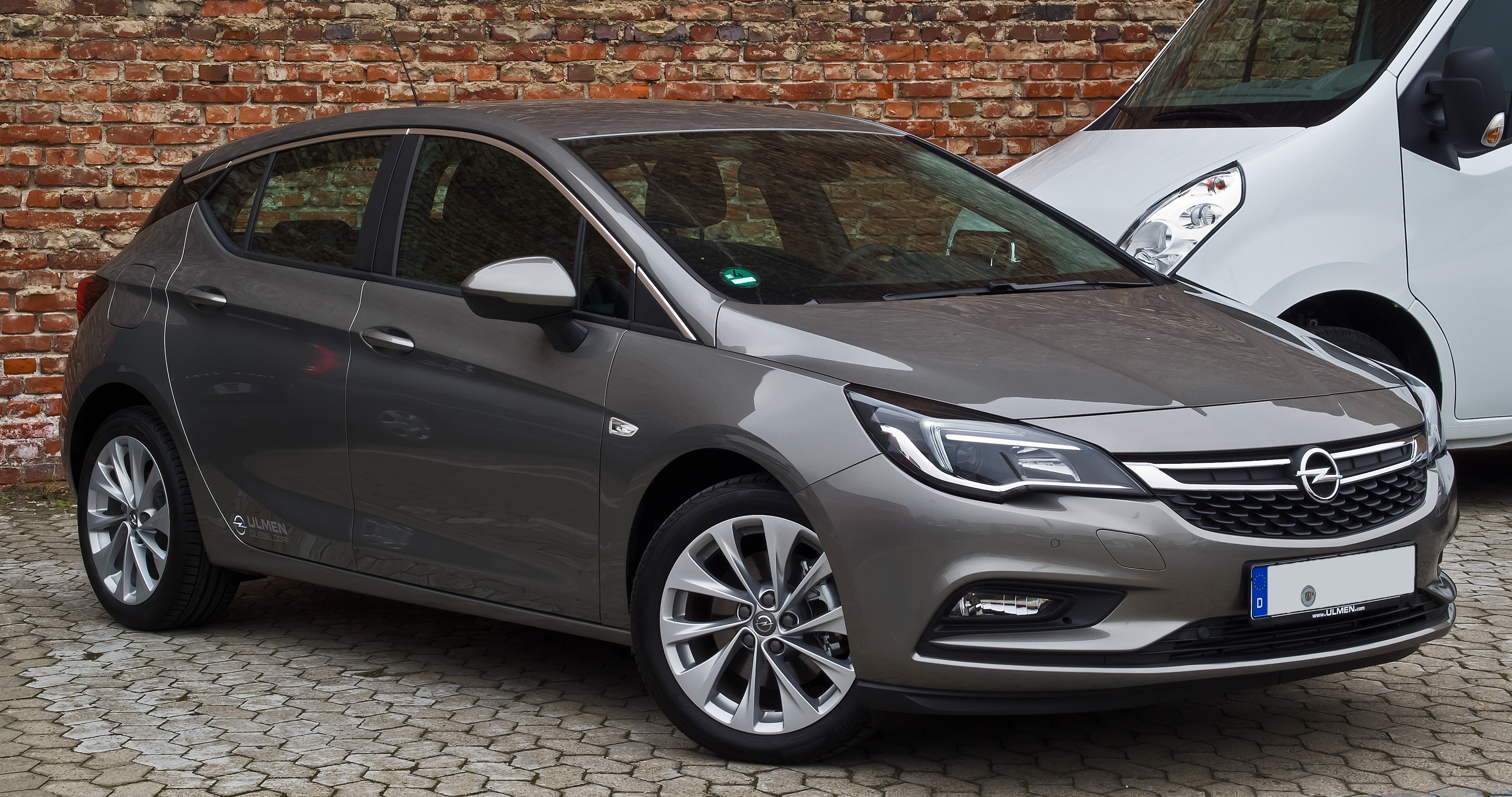
Opel Astra K

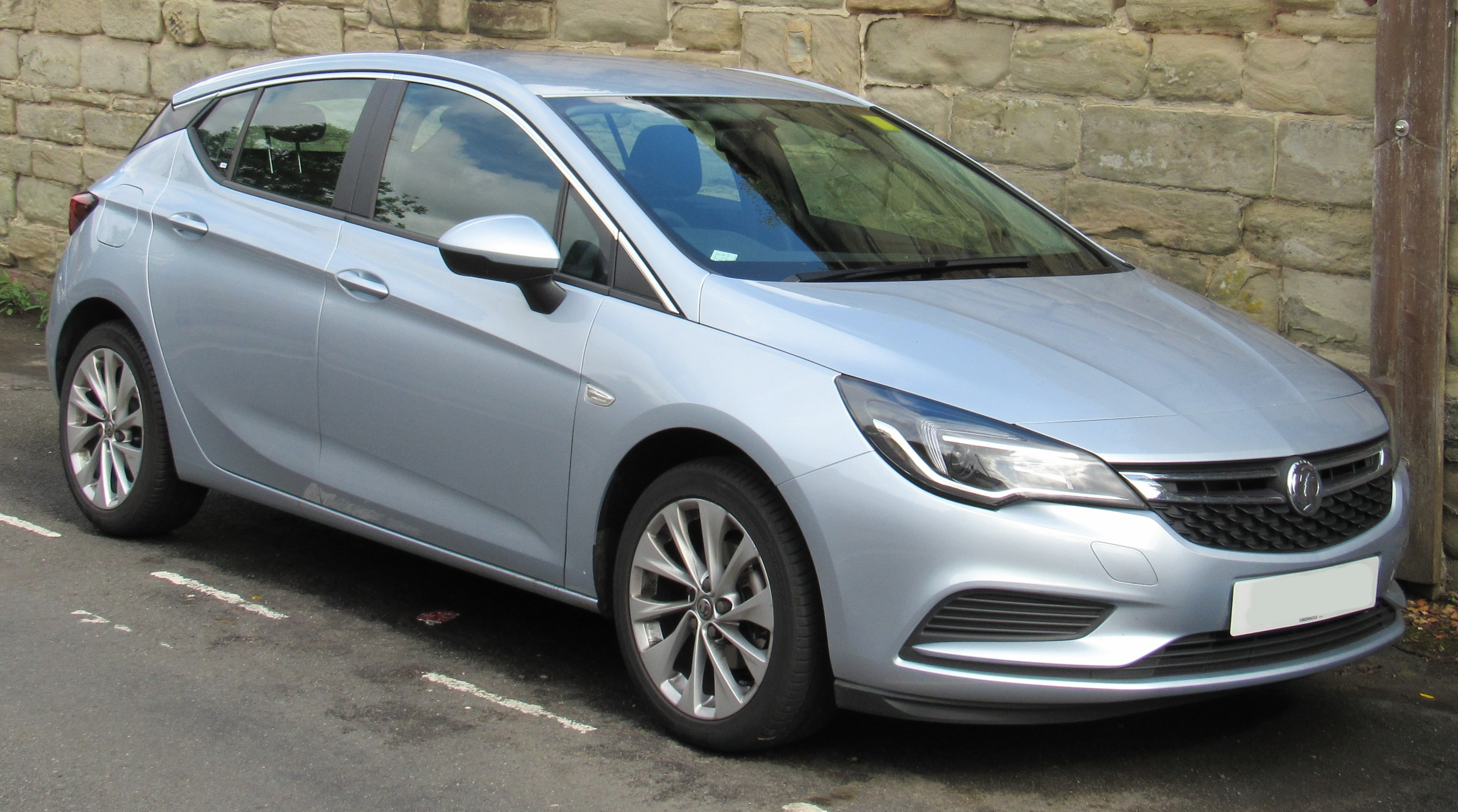
Vauxhall Astra Mk7

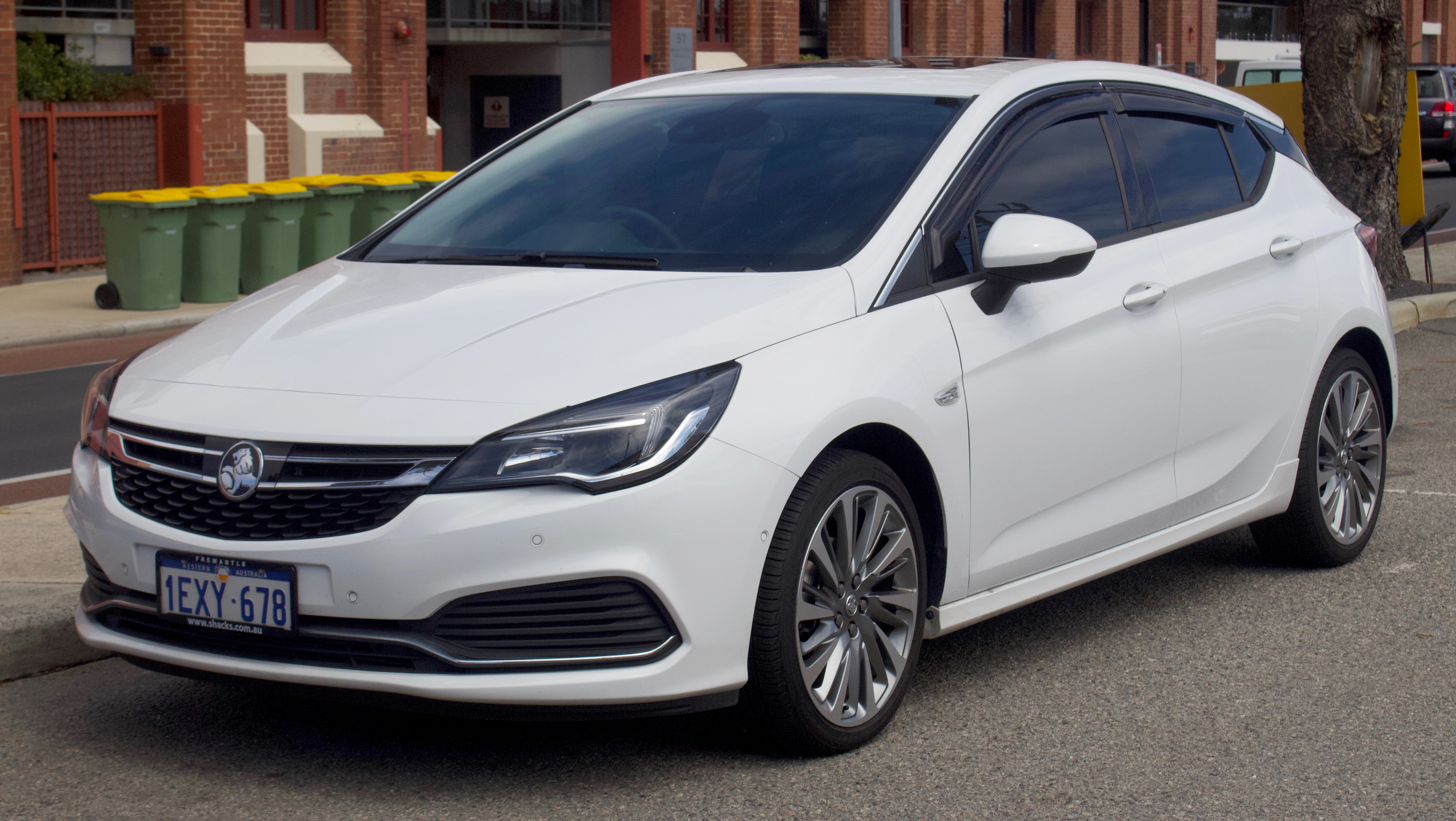
Holden Astra Hatchback

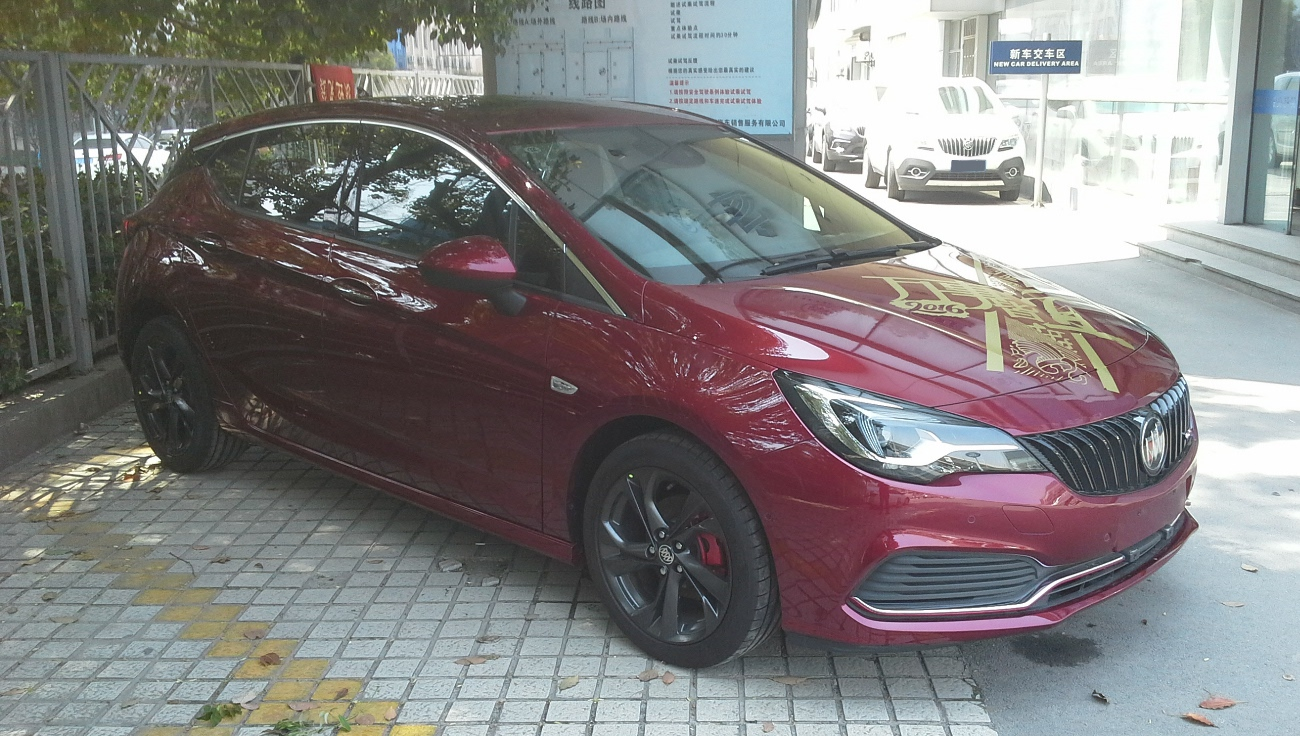
Buick Verano GS

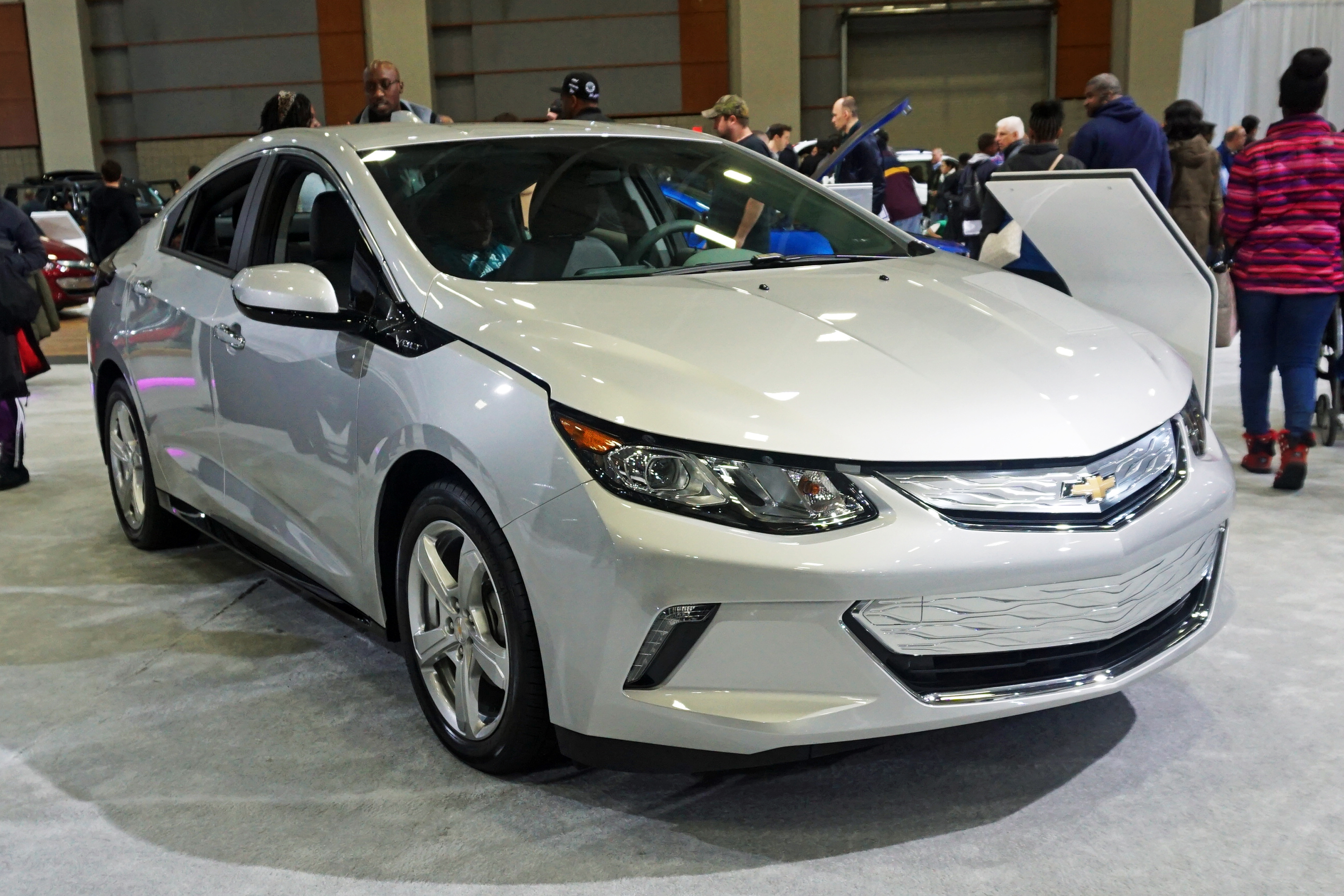
Chevrolet Volt (second generation)

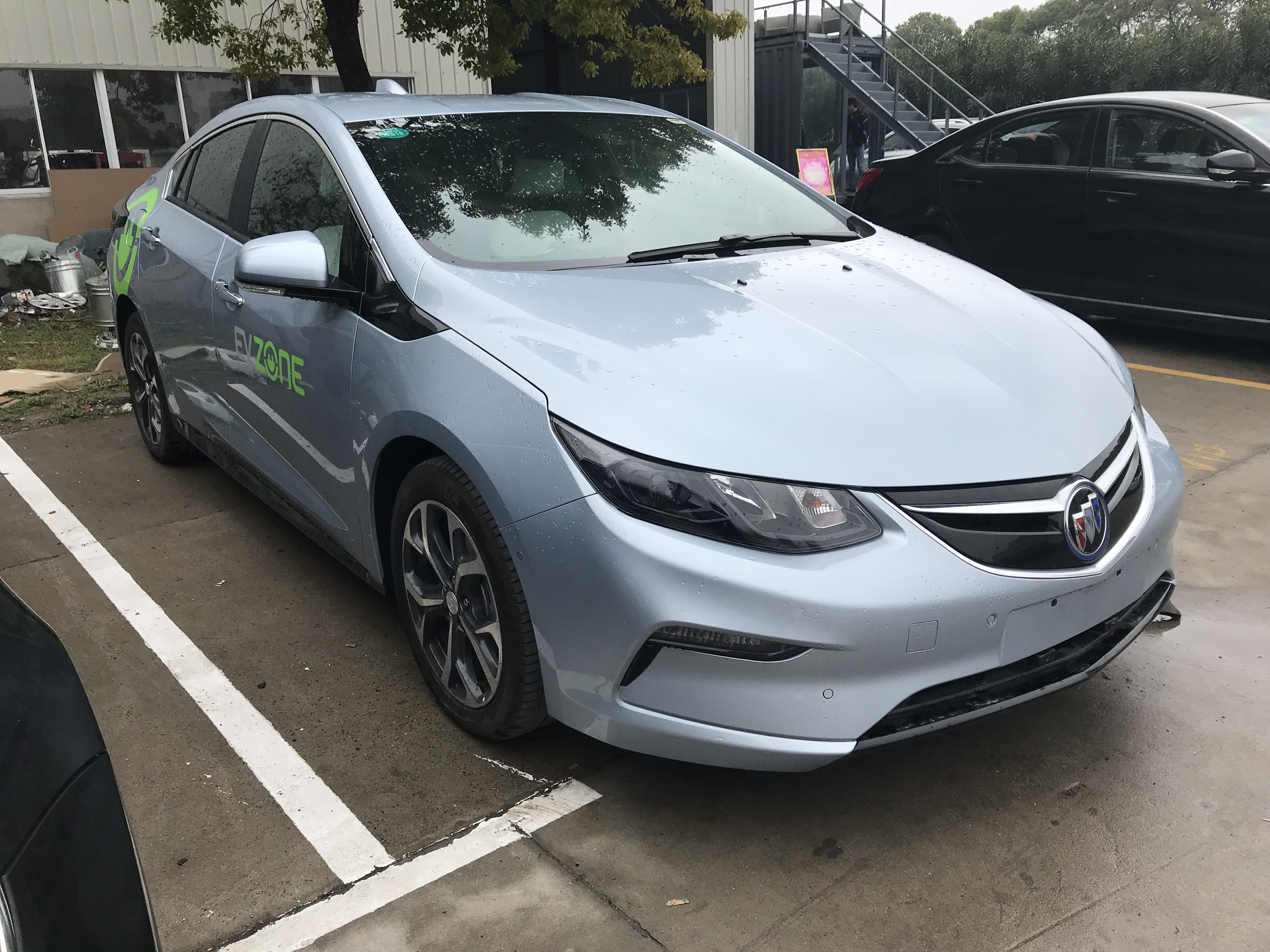
Buick Velite 5

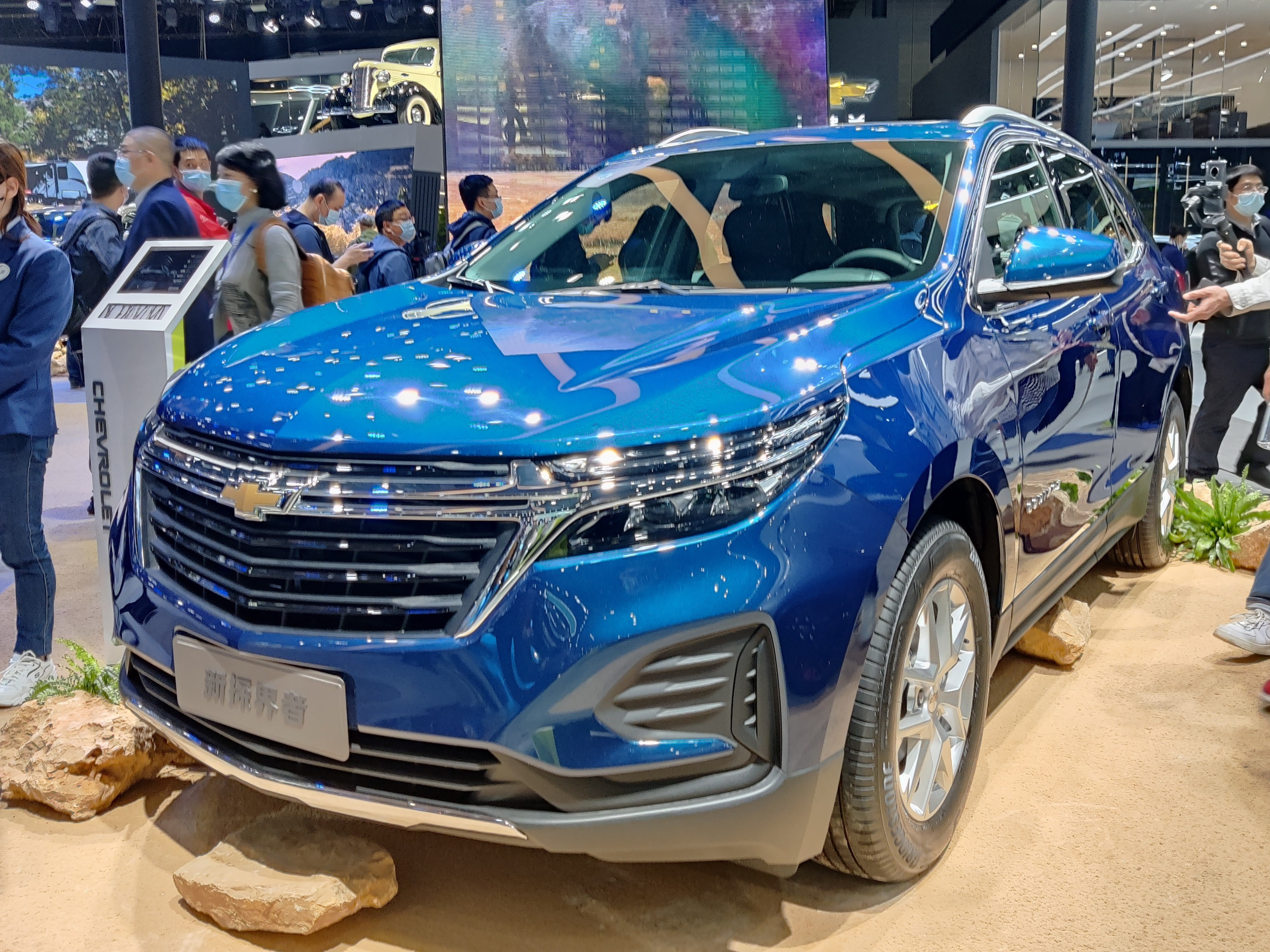
Chevrolet Equinox

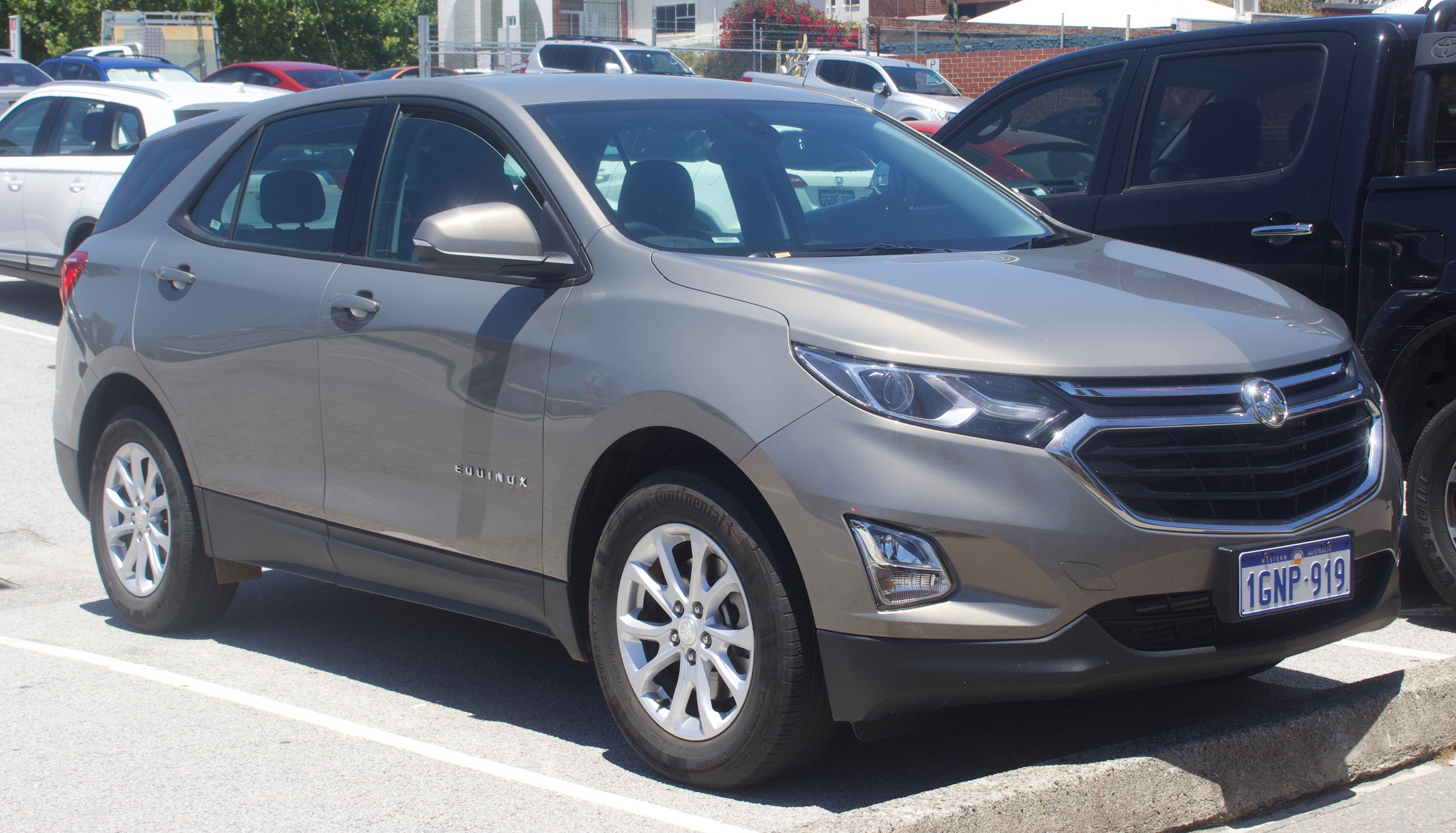
Holden Equinox

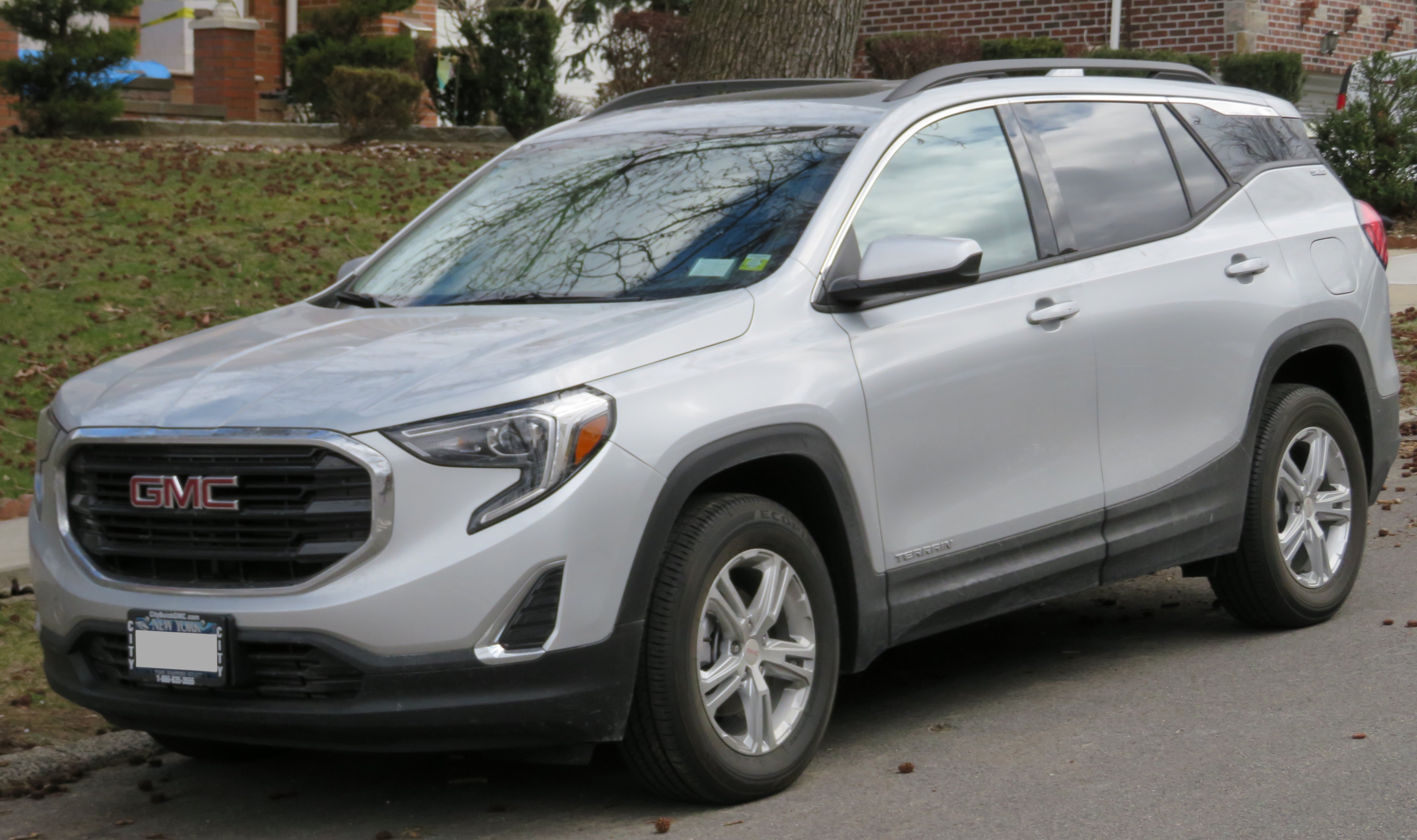
GMC Terrain

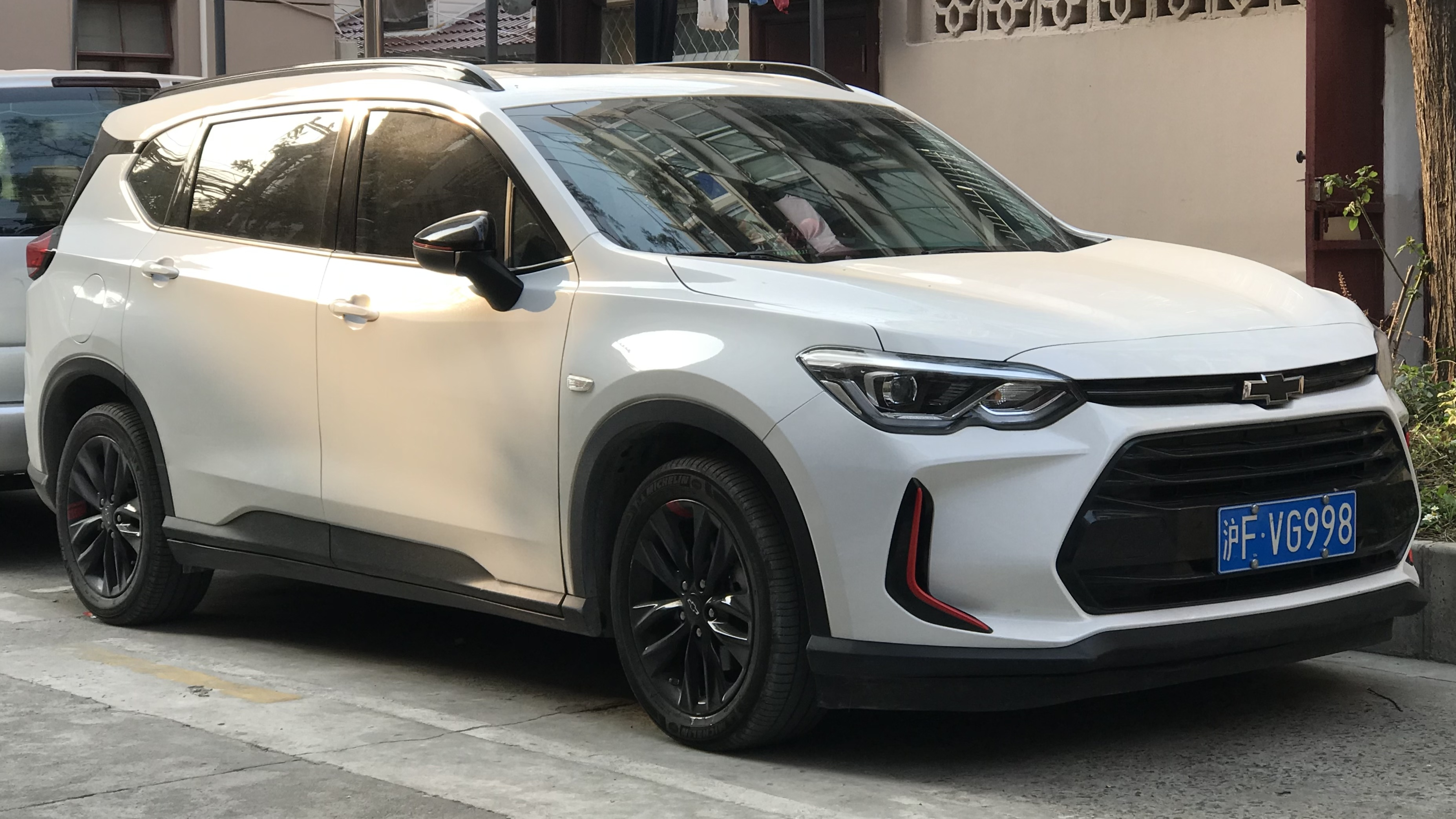
Chevrolet Orlando

=== GM-PATAC K ===
In 2015, Pan Asia Technical Automotive Center (PATAC), GM's joint development center with SAIC, revealed their own simplified variant of D2XX, known as the "GM-PATAC K" platform (rather than "K" so as to distinguish it from the former GM K platforms). The following vehicles use this variant of the platform, none of which are sold in the United States:

- 2015–2023 Buick Excelle GT
- 2016–2021 Chevrolet Cavalier
- 2017–2023 Buick GL6
- 2019–present Chevrolet Monza
- 2017–present Roewe i5/Ei5
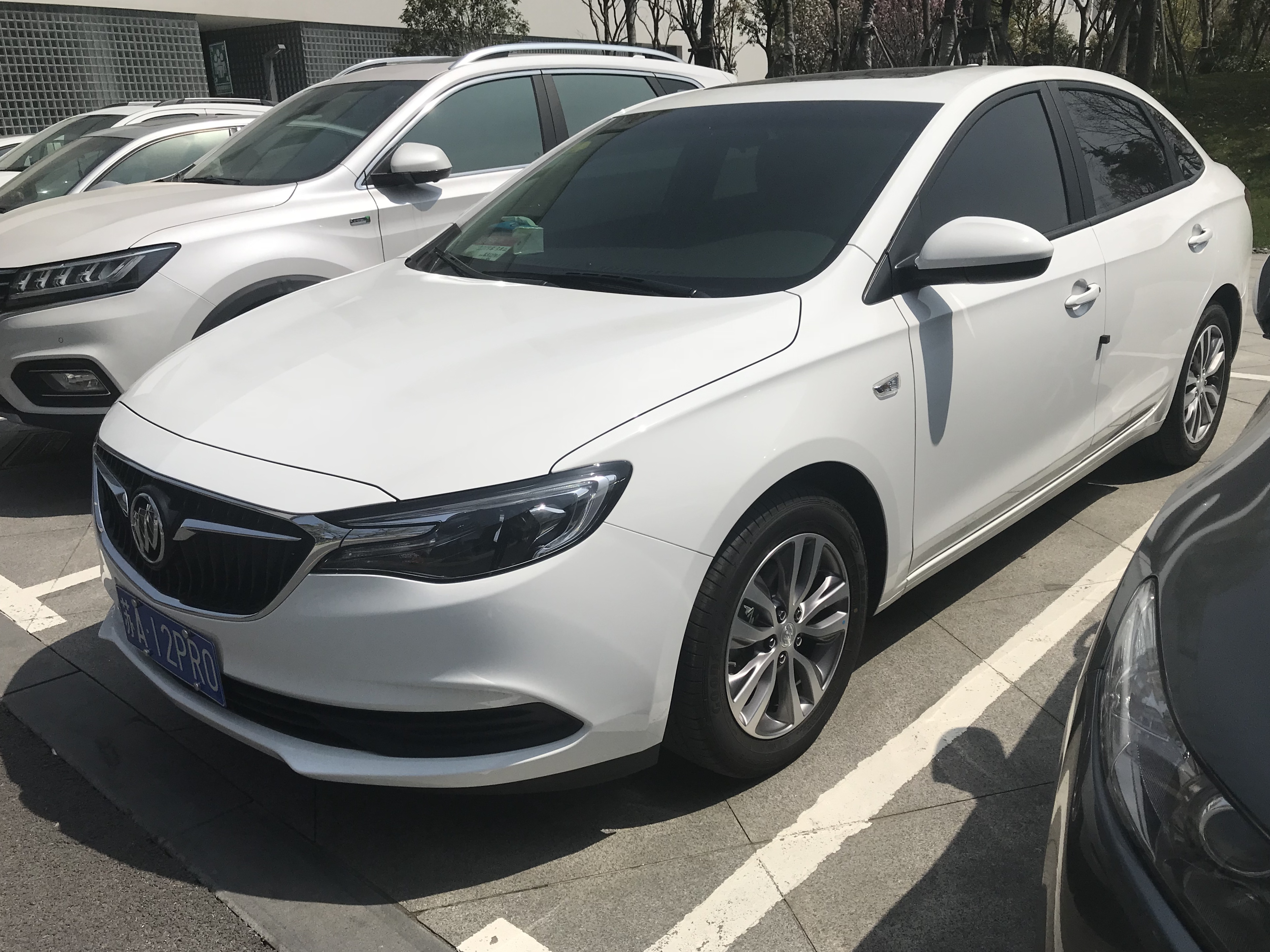
Buick Excelle GT

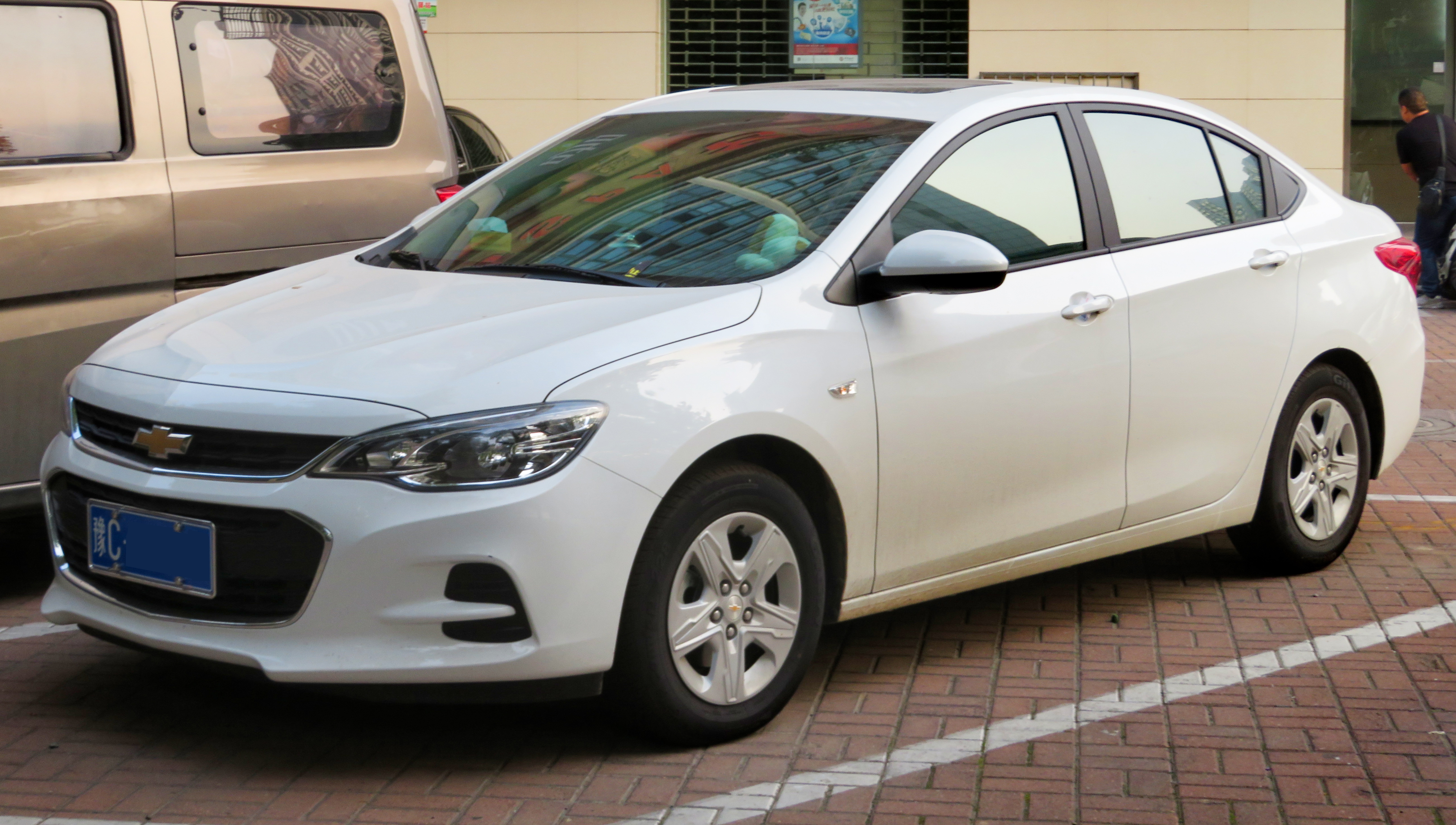
Chevrolet Cavalier

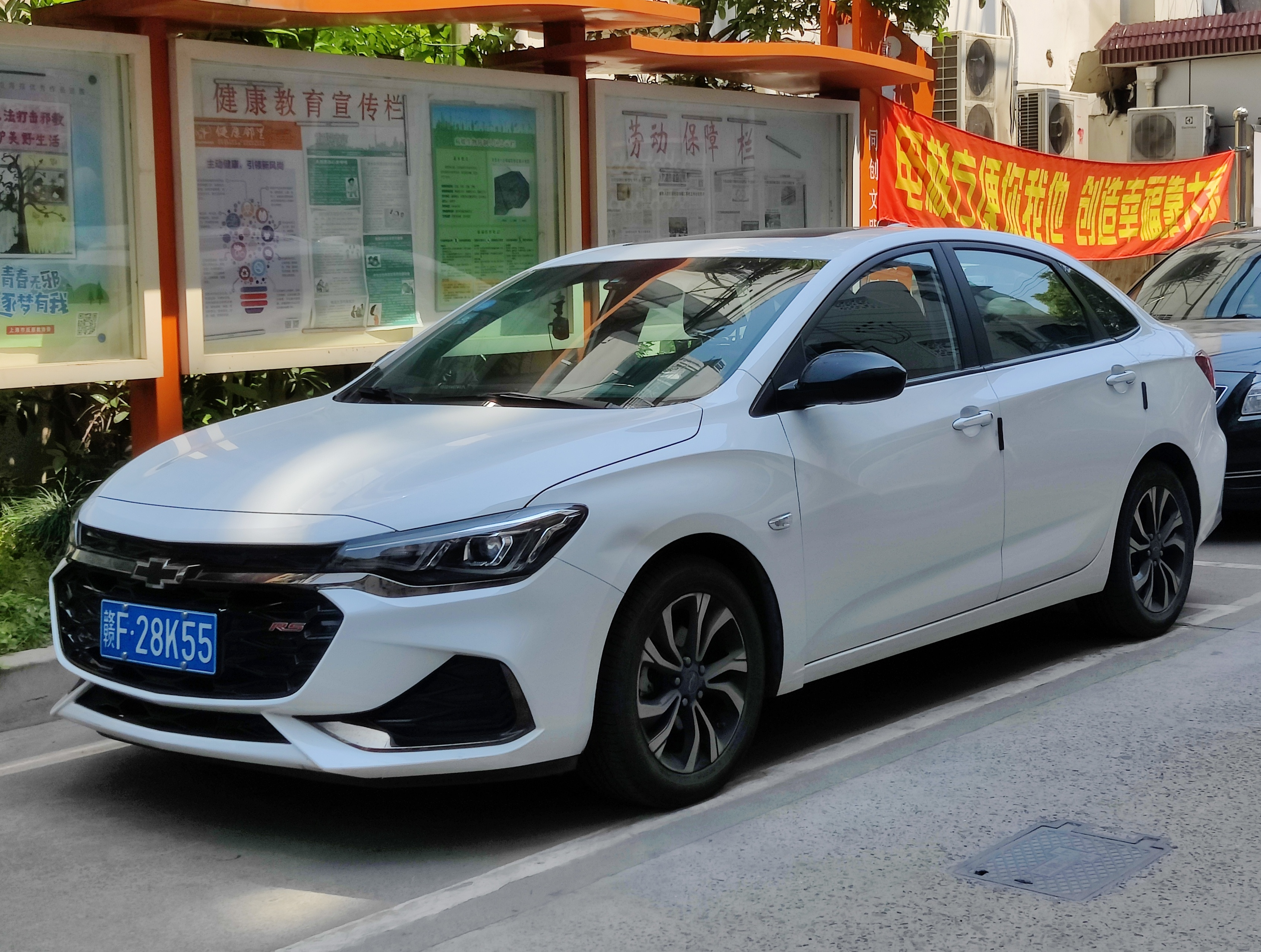
Chevrolet Monza

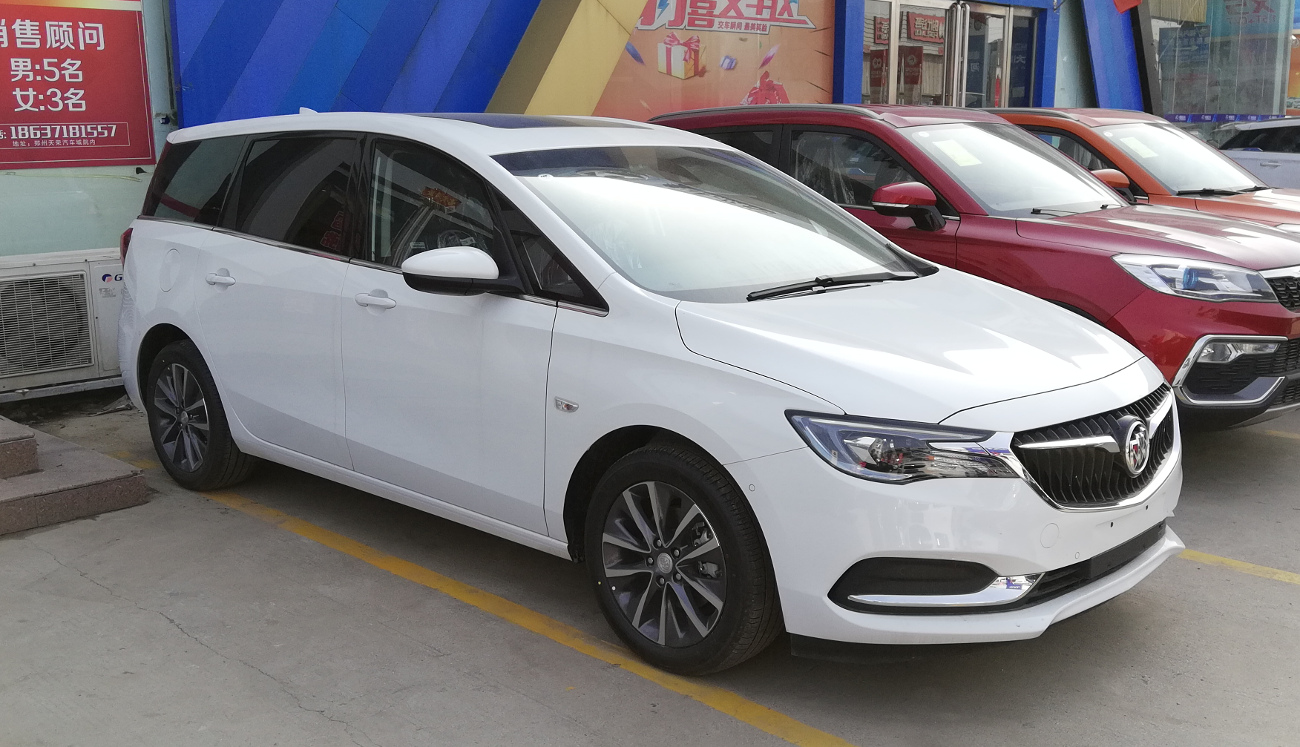
Buick GL6

== See also ==
- List of General Motors platforms
