= Chevrolet Cobalt SS =

Sport compact car

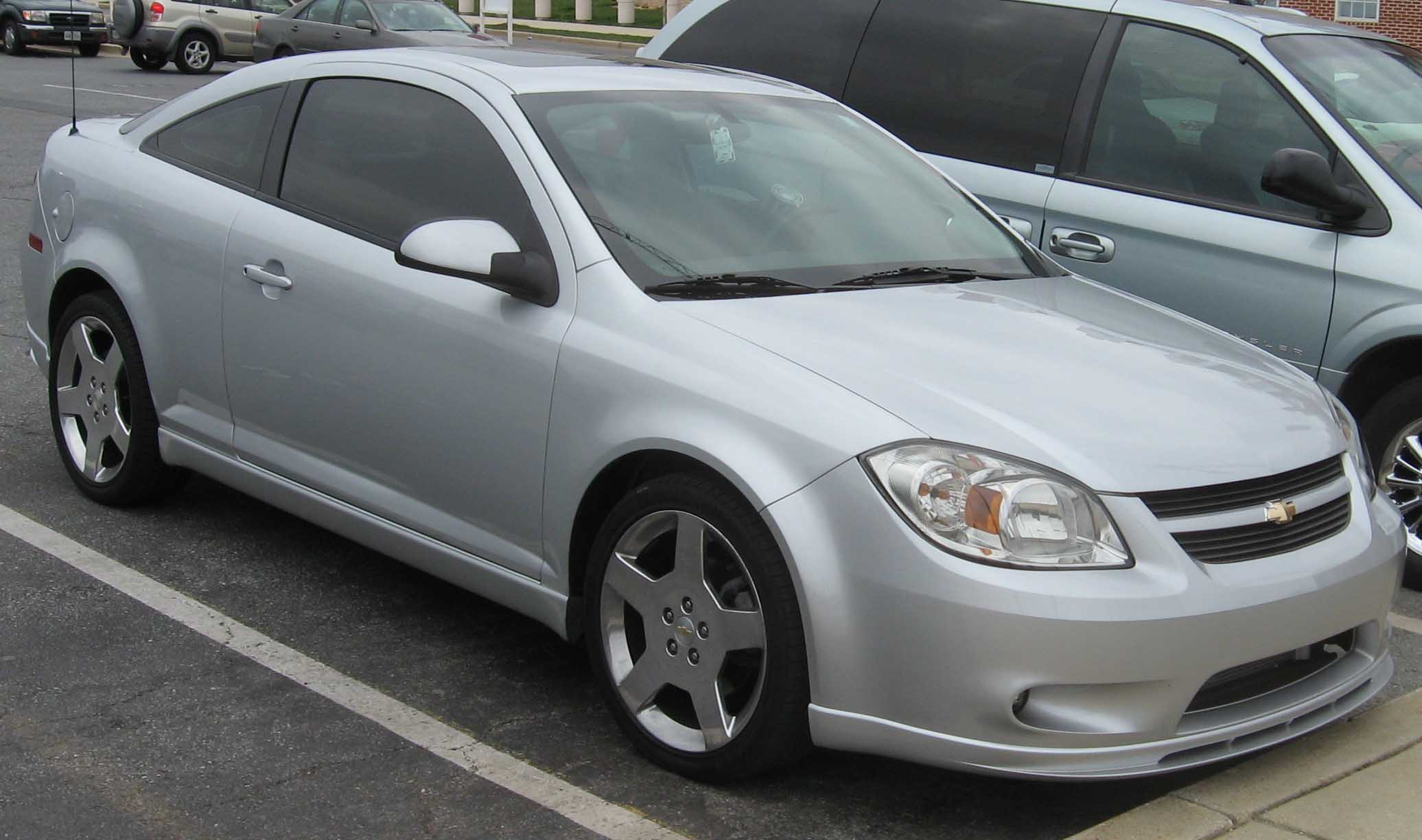

Overview
- Manufacturer: Chevrolet (General Motors)
- Model years: 2005–2010
- Assembly: United States: Lordstown, Ohio (Lordstown Assembly)

Body and chassis
- Class: Sport compact
- Body style: 2-door coupe 4-door sedan
- Layout: FF layout
- Platform: GM Delta platform/GMX001
- Related: Chevrolet Cobalt; Chevrolet HHR SS; Pontiac G5 GT; Saturn ION3 2.4; Saturn Ion Red Line

Powertrain
- Engine: 2.0 L LSJ SC I4; 2.0 L LNF turbo I4; 2.4 L LE5 I4
- Transmission: 5-speed Saab F35 manual 5-speed Getrag F23 manual 4-speed 4T45 (Sport/SS N/A) automatic

Dimensions
- Curb weight: 2,815 lb–3,001 lb (1,277 kg–1,361 kg)

The Chevrolet Cobalt SS comprises three sport compact versions of the Chevrolet Cobalt that were built on the General Motors Delta platform at Lordstown Assembly in Ohio, United States. The three versions included two forced induction inline-four Ecotec engines and a third naturally aspirated engine that was later called the Cobalt Sport. SS is an abbreviation of Super Sport, a historic moniker used by Chevrolet to denote high performance upgrades that meet certain criteria.

The Cobalt SS was considered GM's first foray into the tuner market, launching as a 205 hp (153 kW; 208 PS) supercharged 2.0 L coupe in late 2004, paired only with the Saab F35 5-speed manual transmission. The following year, a naturally aspirated 1SS model equipped with GM's new 2.4 L 171 hp (128 kW; 173 PS) engine was added in both coupe and sedan body styles, including automatic and manual transmission options. Production of the supercharged coupe continued until 2007, and after a brief hiatus the SS relaunched in the second quarter of 2008 with a more efficient and powerful turbocharged 2.0 L engine producing 260 hp (194 kW; 264 PS) before all Cobalt production ended in 2010. (See timeline).

The Cobalt SS received generally positive reviews, in particular the turbocharged and supercharged versions; with the latter becoming the most commonly recognized variant. In a 2013 review, journalist Patrick George called it the best compact car ever made by General Motors, and a potential "future classic". At first release in 2004, the supercharged version was praised for its performance but drew criticism for its interior quality and exterior styling, both described as too reminiscent of its predecessor, the Cavalier. Reports surfaced in May 2009 that General Motors planned to eliminate the Cobalt SS as early as December 2009, but they proved to be untrue. Production continued but ordering options for late 2010 models were limited and production of all Cobalts ended in June 2009. The car was replaced by the Cruze, but a high performance version comparable to the Cobalt SS was never built and the Cruze ended production for the North American market in 2019.

== Model details ==
=== Overview ===
SS Turbocharged (left) and Supercharged (right) coupes

General Motors used five different inline-four engines in the Cobalt over the course of production, and designated three as SS models. The first was launched in 2004 as a 2005 model with a new powertrain that had debuted one year earlier on the Saturn ION Red Line. It was available as a Supercharged coupe only. The naturally aspirated 2.4 L LE5 engine was the next SS to launch in late 2005 as a 2006 model, available as both a coupe and sedan for the duration of its run. However, in late 2007, at the same time the announcement cancelling the SS Supercharged was made, GM also announced that the 2.4 L would be renamed "Cobalt Sport", rendering Chevrolet without a Cobalt SS for the first half of the 2008 model year. The 2.0 L LNF turbocharged Cobalt was the last to launch in the second quarter of 2008. It was initially available only as a coupe until a sedan option was offered for the 2009 model year but again deleted for 2010 after less than 500 were produced.

All three models of the Cobalt SS feature four wheel, anti-lock disc brakes. Compared to the base Cobalt, the SS has lower front and rear fascias for a more aggressive look with integrated fog lights, side rocker moldings, interior accents, and a chrome exhaust tip. Exclusive to the 2.0 L Cobalt are a titanium‑faced sport analogue cluster with a 160 mph (260 km/h in Canada) speedometer, an A‑pillar mounted boost gauge, reclining front bucket seats with two‑tone leather‑appointed seating surfaces, vertical adjusting head restraints and driver‑side lumbar and height adjusters, and a sport‑tuned FE5 suspension with a 24 mm front stabilizer bar and 22 mm rear stabilizer bar.

=== SS Supercharged (2005-2007) ===
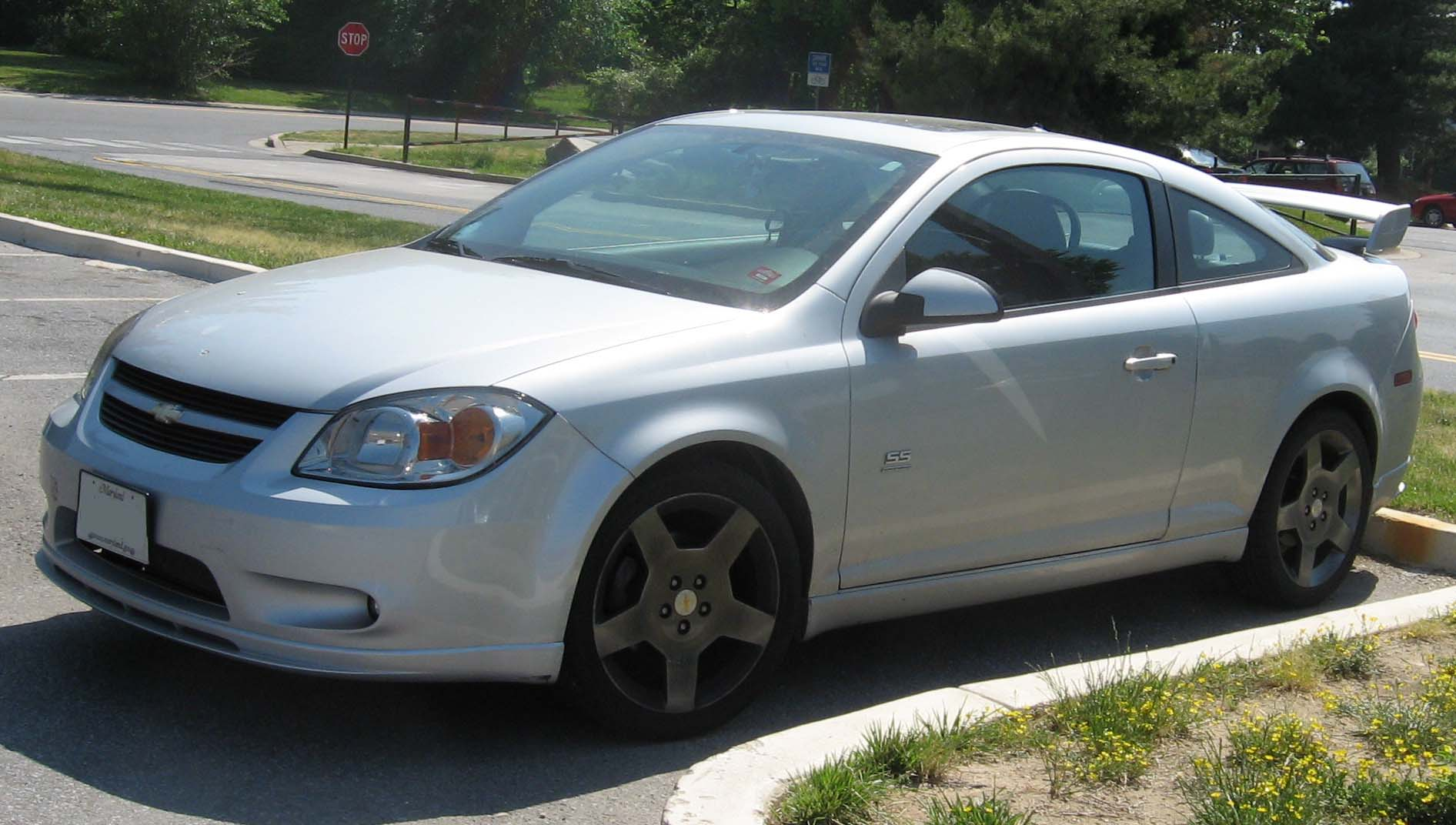
A SS Supercharged Cobalt

Available as a coupe only, the SS Supercharged featured the 2.0 L LSJ Ecotec engine with an Eaton M62 Roots type supercharger and air‑to‑liquid intercooler. The engine makes 205 hp (153 kW) at 5600 rpm and 200 lb⋅ft (271 N⋅m) at 4,400 rpm. 18‑inch broad spoke wheels with P215/45R18 summer Pirelli tires were standard. Optional for the LSJ was a performance package coded G85 that added Recaro bucket seats and a limited-slip differential (LSD). The G85 option continued in the LNF Cobalt, but added only the LSD. The car became notable for a high‑profile spoiler that was standard in 2005, but optional from 2008 when a lower profile spoiler used on all other Cobalt coupes became an option.

GM offered dealer-installed performance upgrade packages called "stage kits" that were covered by factory warranty. The Stage 1 kit consists of new fuel injectors and a reprogram of the ECU, and yields up to a 30 hp (22 kW) improvement. The Stage 2 kit consists of new fuel injectors and the same reprogram with a smaller serpentine belt and pulley for the supercharger, producing a 36 hp (27 kW) improvement and 18 lb⋅ft (24 N⋅m) of torque. Both stage 1 and 2 kits increase the engine redline to 7,000 rpm. The Stage 3 kit consists of a smaller, 76 mm (3.0 in) supercharger pulley, a 2‑pass intercooler end plate and a customizable replacement ECU. The Stage 3 ECU allows for the use of a 50‑shot of nitrous, 100 octane fuel and an adjustable redline from 6,750 to 8,000 rpm. Stage 3 produces 248 hp (185 kW) using 93 octane fuel, up 260 hp (194 kW) using 100 octane fuel, and much higher power with nitrous. Stage 3 is for track use only, and to emphasize this, air conditioning is disabled with the Stage 3 ECU.

Wheel hop, wheelspin, and a general lack of traction were problems frequently encountered with the supercharged Cobalt due to its front-wheel-drive setup and relatively high torque. Upgraded front and rear transmission and motor mounts would help to alleviate these issues. The GM Performance Division later tried to rectify these problems in the turbocharged car by providing wider, stickier tires and stronger axles.

=== SS Turbocharged (2008-2010) ===
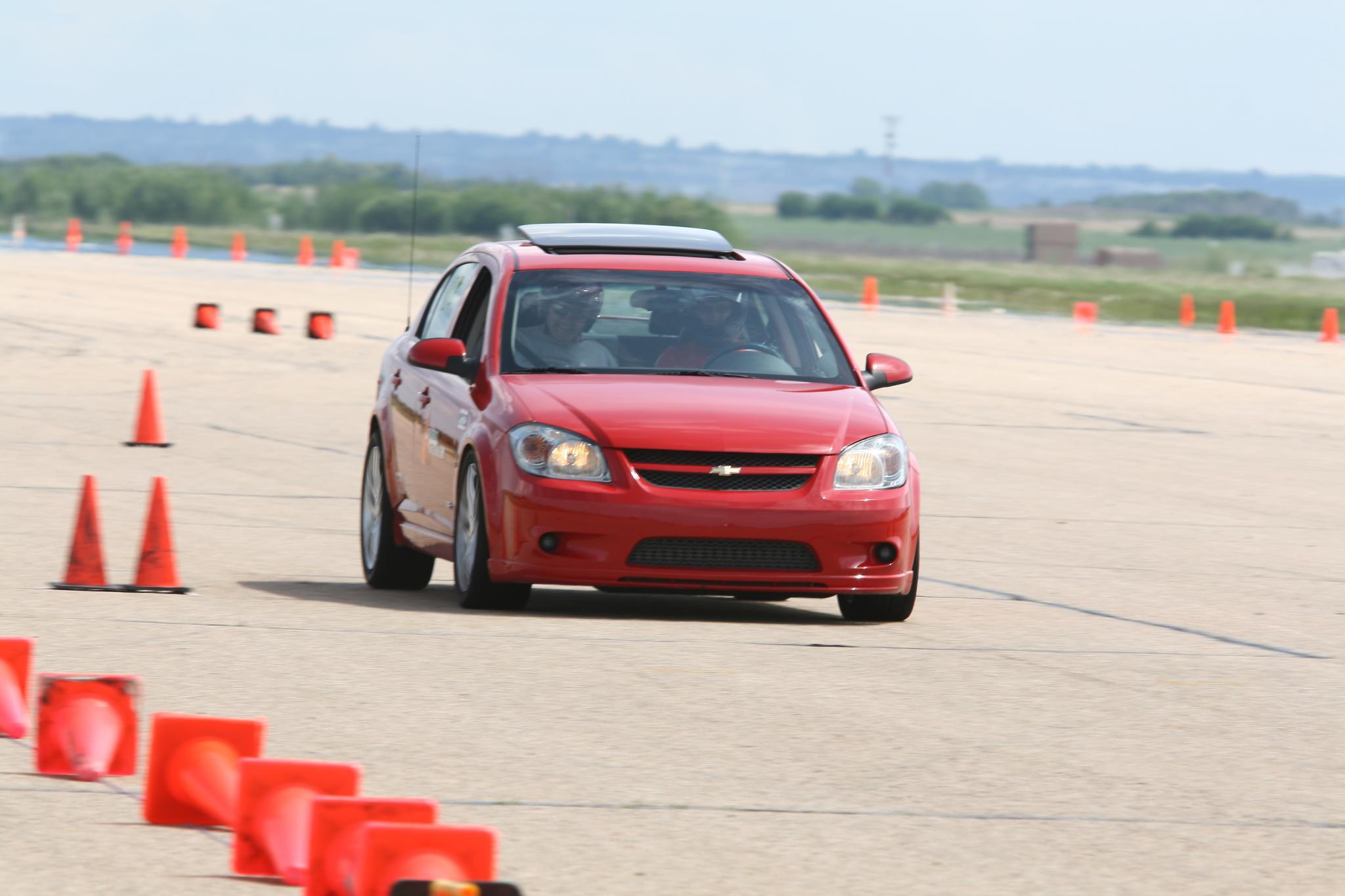
SS Turbocharged sedan racing

The LSJ engine did not meet emissions requirements for the 2008 model year, and General Motors' contract with Eaton had expired. The non-supercharged 2.4 L Cobalt SS also lost its Super Sport designation for the 2008 model year and was renamed "Sport", leaving no SS in production. However, in fall 2007, a more powerful Cobalt SS was announced for the second quarter of 2008. It would be equipped with the 2.0 L, turbocharged, direct injected, VVT, LNF Ecotec engine, making 260 hp (194 kW) at 5300 rpm and 260 lb⋅ft (353 N⋅m) at 2,000 rpm, remaining mated to the F35 5-speed manual transmission. The engine had been introduced in a rear wheel drive application for the 2007 GM Kappa platform, which includes the Saturn Sky, Pontiac Solstice, and Opel GT.

Also new for the 2008 SS were SS-embroidered sport seats with suede-like UltraLux inserts, several new exterior colors, and wider 18-inch (460 mm) forged, split-spoke wheels with P225/40R18 Continental AG tires, styled similarly to those offered for the Chevrolet Corvette C6. The car's electronics were also new, and along with greater assist in poor traction conditions, a "no-lift-shift" feature was added which allows the driver to maintain turbocharger boost during shifts to a higher gear. During a no‑lift‑shift, the driver begins the shift normally by depressing the clutch, but the accelerator pedal is held wide open while the shift is completed. Also new was "launch control", which feathers the throttle at roughly 4,800 rpm until engagement of the clutch, allowing more consistent launches in competitive situations. To activate launch control, the driver presses twice on the traction control button which first turns off traction control, and then notifies the driver through the Driver's Information Center that Competitive Mode is active and launch control is ready for use. These features help propel the car from 0 to 60 mph (97 km/h) in 5.5 seconds, and a quarter mile time of 13.9 seconds at 102.5 mph (165.0 km/h). GM had previously offered a turbocharged four cylinder with front wheel drive in the 1986-1990 Pontiac Sunbird GT and the Buick Skyhawk T-Type from 1986 to 1988.

New for 2009 was the aforementioned four-door sedan option, as well as an optional "reconfigurable performance display" (RPD) for the coupe only. The $295 option replaced the boost gauge in the A‑pillar, and allows the driver to manipulate traction control, stability control, "shift points", and the engagement of Competition Mode, as well as information regarding the car's engine torque and horsepower, g‑force, boost, wideband air fuel ratio, barometric pressure, temperature, and battery voltage. For 2010, the RPD and a power sunroof were standard. The red/ebony and grey/ebony interior color options were also dropped, as was the turbocharged sedan.

A stage 1 kit which raises power to 290 hp (216 kW) and 340 lb⋅ft (461 N⋅m) was made available in October 2009 after several delays. The kit can be installed by the owner of the car, but final alteration of the vehicle's engine control unit must take place at a GM dealer.

=== SS Naturally aspirated (Sport) (2006-2008) ===
A blue granite SS 2.4 L naturally aspirated coupe

Chevrolet introduced a naturally aspirated Cobalt SS in the fall of 2005 as a 2006 model, available as both a coupe and sedan. It featured the 2.4 LE5 engine with variable valve timing, making 171 hp (128 kW) at 5,600 rpm and 163 lb⋅ft (221 N⋅m) at 5,000 rpm, later upped to 167 lb⋅ft (226 N⋅m) at 4,500 rpm. The LE5 engine was paired with a 5-speed manual (or optionally the 4T45 4‑speed automatic) for 2006 and was introduced on both the FWD Delta platform and RWD Kappa platform. For the 2006 and 2007 model years the car was called SS, or "1SS", but was replaced with the moniker "Cobalt Sport" for 2008 with the anticipated introduction of the turbocharged SS; it is the Getrag F23 transmission with different ratios from the F35 in the forced induction cars, and is the same transmission that Chevrolet mated to the 2.2 L L61 engine in the Cobalt LS and LT.

Other changes over the supercharged car are notable but not drastic; 17‑inch broad spoke wheels with narrower P205/50R17 all‑season Pirelli tires were standard, as was the low profile spoiler. 2.4 L and 2.2 L Sport Package Cobalts have a 140 mph (220 km/h in Canada) speedometer with optional white face gauges. The car rides on the FE3 suspension, superior and more sport‑tuned to that of base Cobalts but less refined than the FE5 on the supercharged and turbocharged cars. Brakes on the 2.4 L naturally aspirated and supercharged model are identical, but the turbocharged model received an upgraded Brembo braking system. The front and rear bumpers are the same, but the front lacks a lip accessory and the bottom of the rear fascia is slightly different. With the exception of exterior styling and some interior trims, the vehicle is identical to the Pontiac G5 GT.

Chevrolet Cobalt SS Performance
	SS Naturally-aspirated w/ 5-speed manual	SS Supercharged	SS Turbocharged
0-60 mph (0-96.5 km/h)	7.1 seconds	5.9 seconds	5.5 seconds
1/4 mile	15.6 at 90 mph (140 km/h)	14.4 at 100 mph (160 km/h)	13.9 at 103 mph (166 km/h)
Top speed*	129 mph (208 km/h)	158 mph (254 km/h)	155 mph (249 km/h)
*As electronically limited by the vehicle's engine control unit.

Chevrolet Cobalt SS Specifications
	SS Naturally-aspirated	SS Supercharged	SS Turbocharged
Overview
Driveline	Five-passenger, front-engine, front-drive coupe		
Driveline	Five-passenger, front-engine, front-drive sedan		Five-passenger, front-engine, front-drive sedan
Construction	Unitized body frame, one- and two-sided galvanized steel		
Chassis/Suspension
Front	Independent strut-type suspension with 22m stabilizer bar	MacPherson independent strut-type with direct acting, 24mm solid stabilizer bar	
Rear	Semi-independent torsion beam with 22mm stabilizer bar		Semi-independent torsion beam with montoube gas shocks; 24mm solid stabilizer bar
Steering type	Electric, power-assisted variable-speed rack-and-pinion		
Steering ratio	16.63:1		14.8:1
Turning circle	37.4 ft (11.4 m)	33.5 ft (10.2 m)	39.4 ft (12.0 m)
Brakes
Type	Power-assisted four-wheel disc with standard anti-lock		Power-assisted four-wheel disc with standard anti-lock; 38mm Brembo four-piston fixed callipers in front and 40mm single-piston rear callipers
Rotor diameter	f: 11.6 in (290 mm) r: 10.6 in (270 mm)		f: 12.4 in (310 mm) r: 11.5 in (290 mm)
Rotor thickness	f: 1.02 in (26 mm) r: 0.55 in (14 mm)		f: 1.02 in (26 mm) r: 0.79 in (20 mm)
Wheels/Tires
Wheel size and type	17 x 7-inch broad-spoke polished aluminum	18 x 7-inch broad-spoke painted or high-polished aluminum	18 x 7.5-inch split-spoke forged aluminum
Tires	P205/50R17 performance	P215/45ZR18 performance	P225/40ZR18 high-performance summer only
Engines
Type	GM LE5 I4 VVT	GM LSJ supercharged I4	GM LNF turbocharged I4 DI VVT
Displacement	2.4 L (2,376 cc or 145 cu in)	2.0 L (1,999 cc or 122 cu in)	2.0 L (1,998 cc or 122 cu in)
Bore and stroke	88 mm x 98 mm (3.46 in x 3.85 in)	86 mm × 86 mm (3.39 in × 3.39 in)	
Cylinder head material	Cast aluminum		
Block material	Cast aluminum		
Valvetrain	Dual overhead camshafts, 4 valves per cylinder; dual continuous variable valve timing	Dual overhead camshafts, 4 valves per cylinder	Dual overhead camshafts, 4 valves per cylinder; dual continuous variable valve timing
Fuel delivery	Sequential multi-port fuel injection with high-flow injectors and electronic throttle control		Direct-injection with a variable high-pressure rail and electronic throttle control
Compression	10.4:1	9.5:1	9.2:1
Horsepower	171 hp (128 kW) at 6,200 rpm	205 hp (153 kW) at 5,600 rpm	260 hp (190 kW) at 5,300 rpm
Torque	163 lbf⋅ft (221 N⋅m) at 5,000 rpm	200 lbf⋅ft (270 N⋅m) at 4,400 rpm	260 lbf⋅ft (350 N⋅m) at 2,000 rpm
Hp (stg 1)		236 hp (176 kW)	280 hp (210 kW)
Tq (stg 1)		205 lbf⋅ft (278 N⋅m)	320 lbf⋅ft (430 N⋅m)
Hp (stg 2)		241 hp (180 kW)	
Tq (stg 2)		218 lbf⋅ft (296 N⋅m)	
Fuel	Premium recommended but not required		
Max engine speed	6750 rpm	6450 rpm	6300 rpm
Fuel economy (city)	25 mpg_{‑US} (9.4 L/100 km; 30 mpg_{‑imp})	23 mpg_{‑US} (10 L/100 km; 28 mpg_{‑imp})	22 mpg_{‑US} (11 L/100 km; 26 mpg_{‑imp})
Fuel economy (hwy)	34 mpg_{‑US} (6.9 L/100 km; 41 mpg_{‑imp})	29 mpg_{‑US} (8.1 L/100 km; 35 mpg_{‑imp})	30 mpg_{‑US} (7.8 L/100 km; 36 mpg_{‑imp})
Transmission
Manual	Getrag F23 5-speed manual	GM Europe F35 5-speed manual	
Automatic	4T45 4-speed automatic		
Dimensions
Length (coupe)	180.3 in (4,580 mm)		
Length (sedan)	180.5 in (4,580 mm)		180.5 in (4,580 mm)
Width	67.9 in (1,720 mm)		
Height (coupe)	55.7 in (1,410 mm)		
Height (sedan)	57.1 in (1,450 mm)		57.1 in (1,450 mm)
Front track (coupe)	57.1 in (1,450 mm)		
Front track (sedan)	58.6 in (1,490 mm)		58.6 in (1,490 mm)
Rear track	58.1 in (1,480 mm)		
Curb weight (coupe)	2,815 lb (1,277 kg)	2,925 lb (1,327 kg)	2,975 lb (1,349 kg)
Curb weight (sedan)	2,871 lb (1,302 kg)		3,001 lb (1,361 kg)
Weight balance (coupe)	60% front, 40% rear		
Weight balance (sedan)	59% front, 41% rear		59% front, 41% rear
Seating capacity	2 front, 3 rear		
Cargo volume	13.9 cubic feet (0.39 m^{3})		
Fuel tank	13.2 US gallons (11.0 imp gal; 50 L)		

== Reception ==
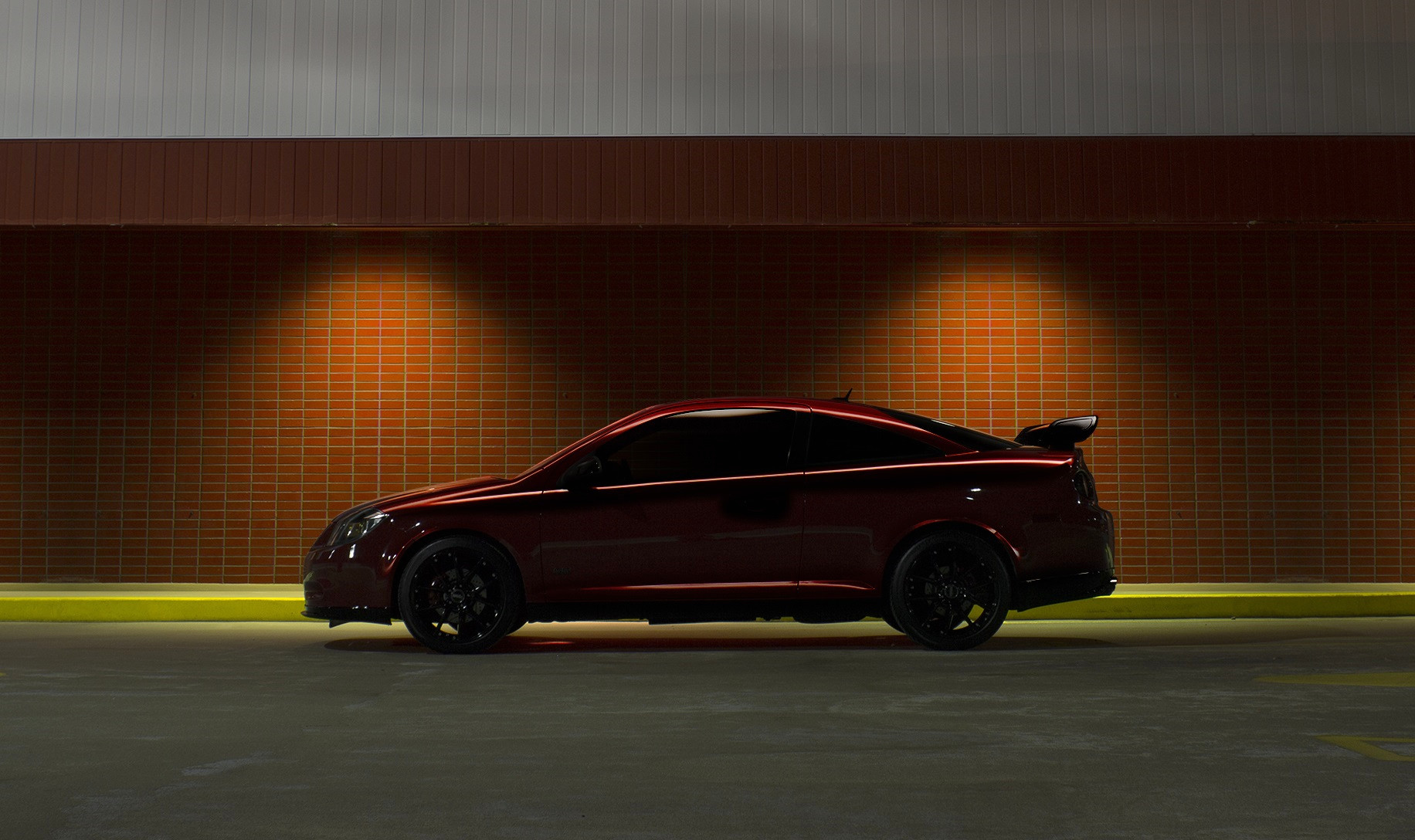
Supercharged coupe in sport red tint coat, an extra cost paint option that became available in 2007

Reviews of the supercharged Cobalt SS were generally positive. While the Cavalier received very negative reviews, the supercharged Cobalt was seen as an improvement, and a worthy first entry for GM into the tuner market. However, the general fit and finish was poor, and power levels were not up to par with other competitors. Journalist Thom Blackett said, "When compared with more contemporary cars including the Dodge Neon SRT-4 and the Subaru WRX, that SS badge seems to lose some of its luster." The F35 transmission has also been deemed inferior to that in the newest of generation of Honda's Civic Si. Critics also disliked the heavy wheels which negatively affected handling, as well as the spoiler which obstructed rearward visibility. Speaking of the high‑profile aero wing, automotive journalist Alexandra Straub said, "the deck-lid spoiler was directly in my line-of-sight when looking out of the rearview mirror. It's almost like it cut everything in half." In his review of a later model, John Neff of Autoblog called the wing "obnoxious". Some Cobalt SS owners have traded spoilers with lower trim owners to obtain a less aggressive look, or traded the entire trunklid with Cobalt LS owners, for whom a rear spoiler is merely optional. The naturally aspirated Cobalt SS has been seen as an improvement over the base models with its slightly more potent 2.4 L engine, but notably inferior to the supercharged car.

Combined with the flexible engine, and especially considering the price, this is a really fine effort, a good package for a front-drive car. Much more refined than the Shelby GT500KR.

— Randy Pobst on the Cobalt SS Turbocharged

The powertrain of the 2008 turbocharged Cobalt SS received rave reviews. John Neff of Autoblog said, "The GM Performance Division completely reworked the Cobalt SS for 2008, swapping in a more powerful turbocharged engine, upgrading the rest of the mechanicals, and tweaking the entire package on the world's most demanding race tracks, including the famed Nürburgring in Germany. The result is – and we're not kidding here – the most impressive performance car to wear a bow-tie badge on sale today." Journalists were impressed with the performance of the car in relation to the price; Neff added that the "2009 Cobalt SS Turbo is freakishly good at going fast and the best bang for the buck value below $30,000." Ron Kiino of Motor Trend said, "at only $22,995, the SS could stand for Super Steal." The MSRP was raised to $24,095 for the 2009 model year.

The Nürburgring‑tuned suspension gives the Cobalt SS some of the best handling characteristics of any General Motors front wheel drive vehicle according to reviewers, and the suspension is stiffer and more refined than the supercharged car. Since the interior is hardly changed other than the seats, those criticisms remain. Of the interior in the turbocharged sedan, Car and Driver said it "is constructed primarily of plastics cheap enough to be rejected from a Chinese toy factory; the Tata Nano probably has a fancier parking-brake lever." The new Cobalt was the winner in its price class (under $30,000) of Car and Driver's 2008 Lightning Lap competition at Virginia International Raceway, beating lap times of several cars in the $30,000-$60,000 class including the Mitsubishi Lancer Evolution X. It held the front-wheel drive record until it was surpassed by the Honda Civic Type R in 2018. Four Chevrolet Cobalt SS cars were used in the Continental Challenge Street Tuner class in 2009.

== See also ==
- GM Performance Division
