= F23 =

F23 or F-23 may refer to:

- Fluorine-23 (^{23}F), an isotope of fluorine
- Funk F-23, an American agricultural aircraft
- Getrag F23 transmission, an Italian 5-speed manual transmission
- Hirth F-23, an aircraft engine
- HMS Kanimbla (F23), a passenger ship requisitioned for the Royal Navy
- HMS Teazer (F23), a T-class destroyer of the Royal Navy
- Northrop F-23, an American fighter aircraft design, developed from the YF-23
- F23 (space group), number 196
