= Saturn Ion =

Model of American car made 2003-2007

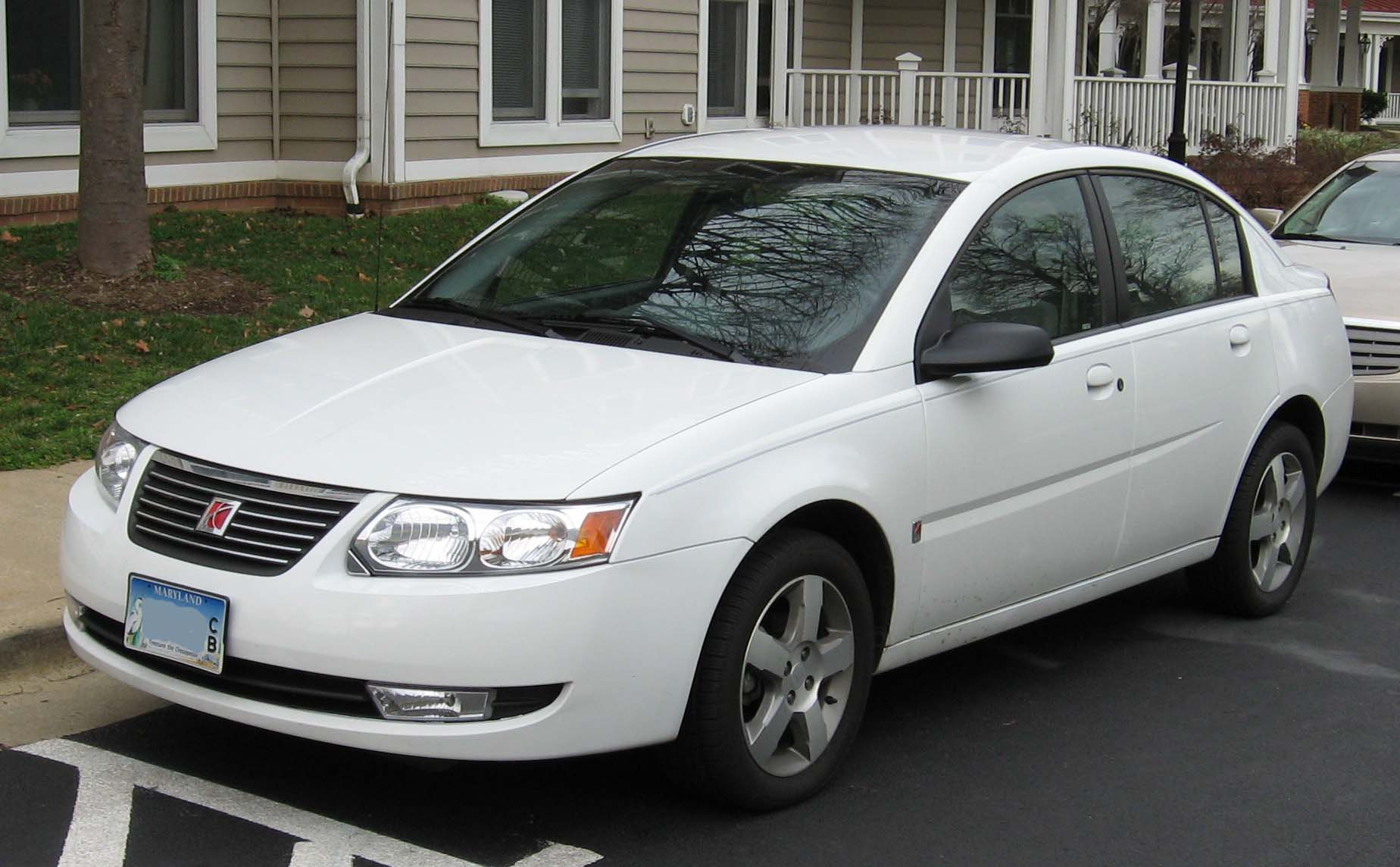
- 2005–07 Ion (facelift)

Overview
- Manufacturer: Saturn Corporation (General Motors)
- Production: 2002–March 29, 2007
- Model years: 2003–2007
- Assembly: United States: Spring Hill, Tennessee

Body and chassis
- Class: Compact car
- Body style: 4-door sedan 4-door quad coupe
- Layout: Transverse front-engine, front-wheel drive
- Platform: GM Delta platform/GMX357
- Related: Chevrolet Cobalt; Chevrolet HHR; Pontiac G5; Opel Astra

Powertrain
- Engine: 2.2 L L61 I4 (gasoline); 2.4 L LE5 I4 (gasoline); 2.0 L LSJ s/c I4 (gasoline)
- Transmission: 5-speed Getrag F23 manual 5-speed Getrag F35 manual 4-speed GM 4T45-E automatic 5-speed Aisin AF33 automatic CVT VTi automatic

Dimensions
- Wheelbase: 103.2 in (2,621 mm) (sedan); 103.2 in (2,621 mm) (coupe); 103.5 in (2,629 mm) (Red Line)
- Length: 184.5 in (4,686 mm) (sedan); 185.0 in (4,699 mm) (coupe); 185.0 in (4,699 mm) (Red Line)
- Width: 67.2 in (1,707 mm) (sedan); 67.9 in (1,725 mm) (coupe); 67.9 in (1,725 mm) (Red Line)
- Height: 57.4 in (1,458 mm) (sedan); 56.0 in (1,422 mm) (coupe); 55.6 in (1,412 mm) (Red Line)
- Curb weight: 2,600–2,984 lb (1,179–1,354 kg)

Chronology
- Predecessor: Saturn S-Series
- Successor: Saturn Astra

The Saturn Ion is a compact car sold by Saturn between the 2003 and 2007 model years. Based on the GM Delta platform, the Ion replaced the Saturn S-Series in 2002, and was replaced by the new Saturn Astra in 2008. Production of the Ion ended on March 29, 2007. The Ion was the last Saturn passenger car built at the Spring Hill, Tennessee, plant which was originally linked to the company's branding, with Saturn owners attending "homecoming" events at the plant.

== Trim levels ==
The Saturn Ion was offered in three trim "Levels": Level 1, Level 2, and Level 3, as well as a "Red Line" trim (in later model years).

The Level 1 trim, only offered as a four-door sedan, was the entry-level Ion trim. It included features such as cloth seating surfaces, 14" tires and steel wheels with plastic wheel covers, manual windows and door locks, an AM/FM stereo radio with a four-speaker audio system, a heater (no standard air conditioning), a 2.2L dual overhead cam (DOHC) inline four-cylinder (I4) gasoline engine, and a five-speed manual transmission. The Level 1 trim was discontinued in later model years of the Ion.

The Level 2 trim was the entry-level Quad Coupe trim, and the upgraded trim for the four-door sedan. It included features such as upgraded 15" tires and steel wheels and plastic wheel covers, air conditioning, and an AM/FM stereo with a single-disc CD player (which also included an auxiliary audio input jack in later model years).

The Level 3 was the top-of-the-line trim for both the Quad Coupe and the four-door sedan. It added more convenience items such as power windows and door locks, keyless entry, 16" tires and aluminum-alloy wheels, upgraded cloth seating surfaces, and an AM/FM stereo with both cassette and single-disc CD players (later, an AM/FM stereo with satellite option, a single-disc CD/MP3 player, and an auxiliary audio input jack).

The Red Line was the performance-oriented trim of the Ion, only available as a Quad Coupe. It featured a 2.0L supercharged I4 gasoline engine, a unique body kit and front grille, unique aluminum-alloy wheels, unique cloth seating surfaces, and a rear spoiler.

== History ==
=== 2003–2004 ===
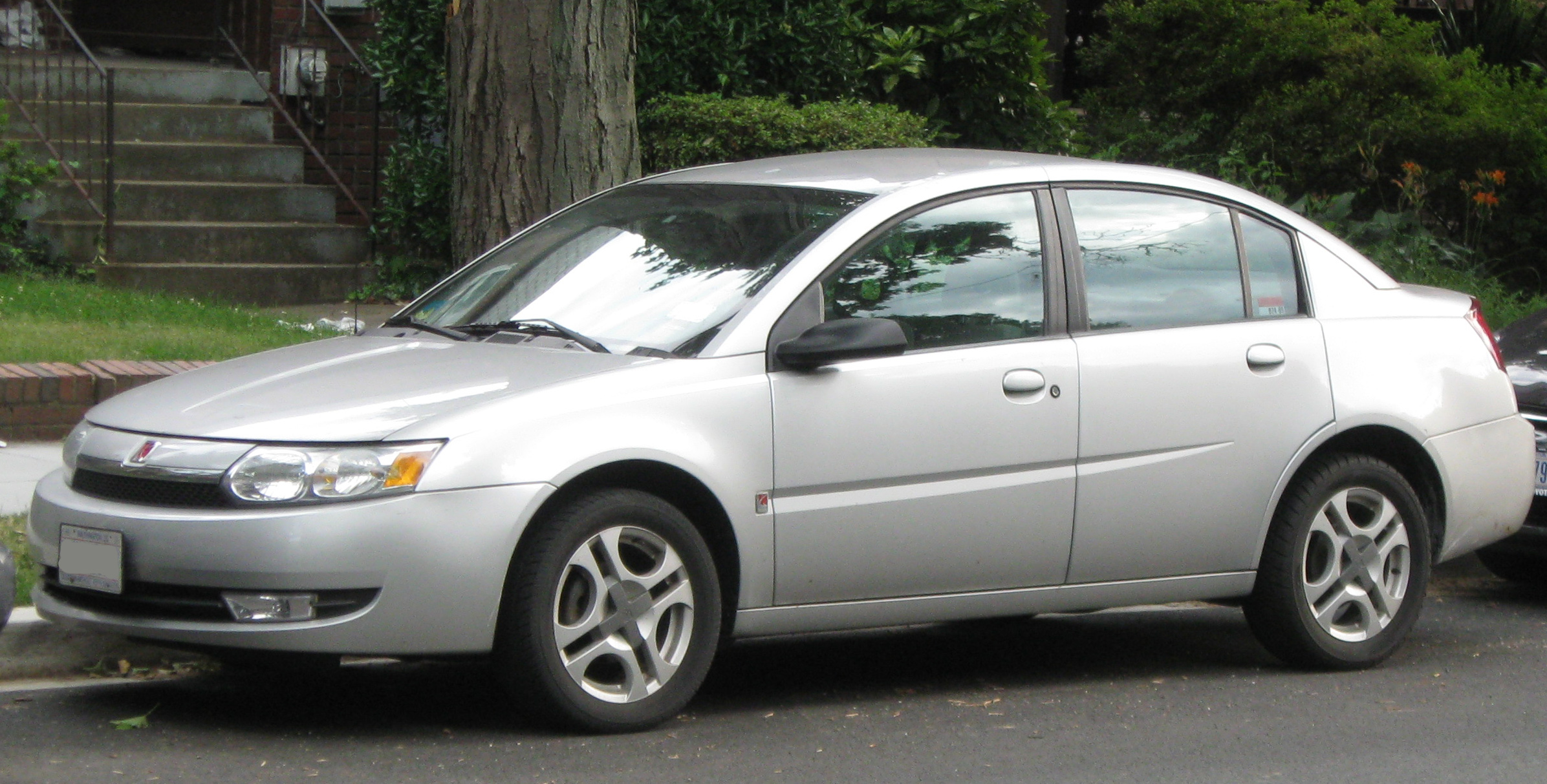
2003–2004 Saturn Ion

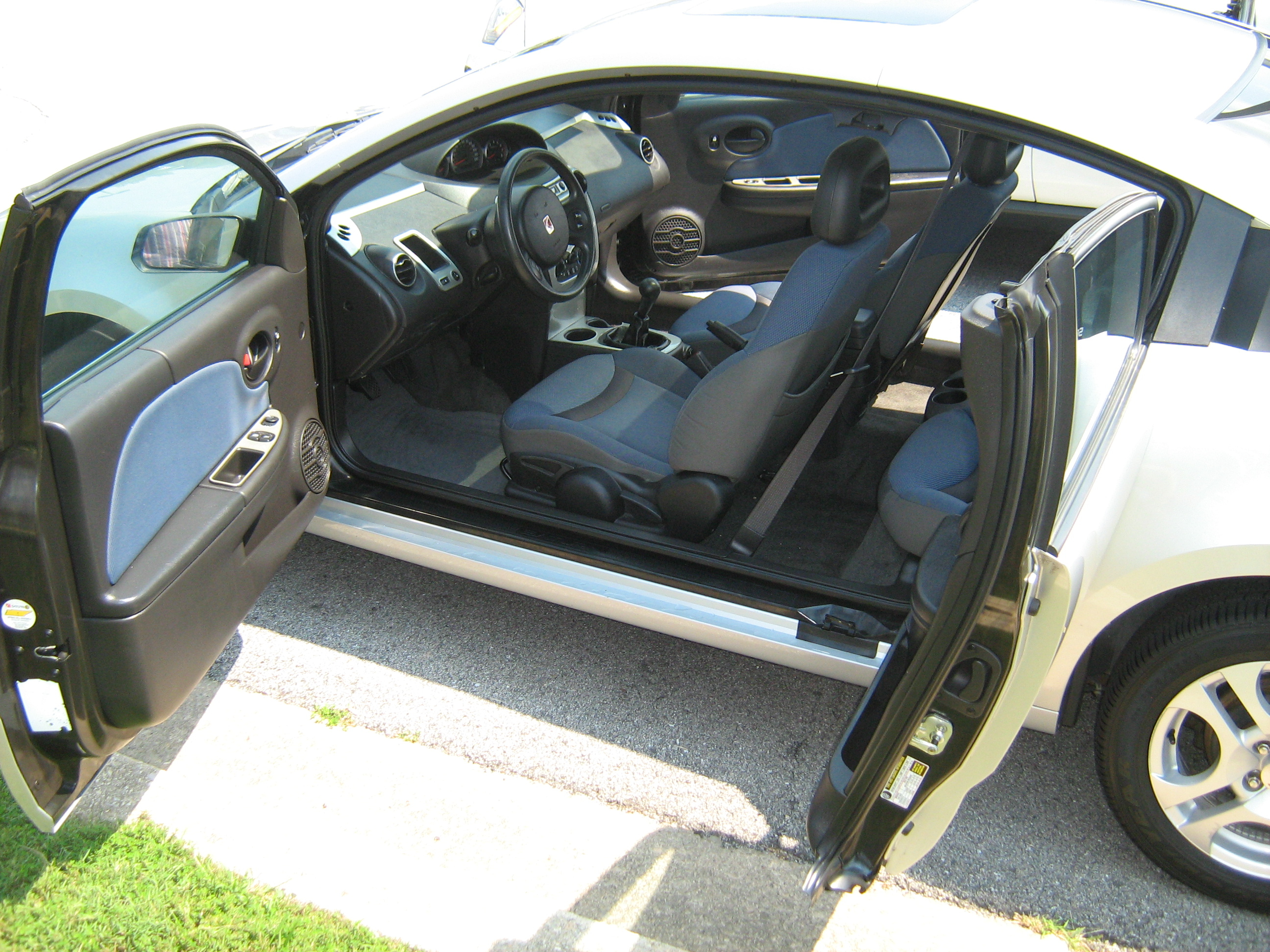
Clamshell doors

The 2003 Saturn Ion quad coupe production car first appeared at the 2002 New York International Auto Show. The 2003 Ion came standard with a 2.2 L 140 hp (104 kW) DOHC Ecotec I4 engine. The Ion sedan went on sale in mid-October 2002, and the quad coupe went on sale in early 2003. The Ion's instrument panel was mounted on the top center of the dashboard, rather than behind the steering wheel. The Ion is also available in sedan level 1, 2, or 3; level three signified a more user friendly setup with power windows and power locks, while lower levels included crank windows and plastic wheel covers. Other extras included fog lights, sunroof, and spoiler. The Saturn Ion Quad Coupe has half-sized rear clamshell doors while the sedan has conventionally hinged doors.

A Getrag F23 5-speed manual or an Aisin AF33 5-speed automatic transmission were available. The compact 5-speed automatic had several unique characteristics. The transmission lacked an overdrive, allowing for five forward gears to be packaged in the size of a typical four-speed manual gearbox, both providing close gear ratios for better acceleration and fuel efficiency while eliminating the heat and parasitic loss generated by the additional planetary gearset. The unit was also "fill-for-life," meaning that it was not intended to be serviced for the life of the vehicle. The 2003 and 2004 Ion Coupes were available with the VTi continuously variable transmission or a Getrag F23 5-speed manual.

For 2004, Saturn also re-calibrated the electric power steering, as well as upgraded interior materials, and offered new sound systems.

=== 2005–2006 ===
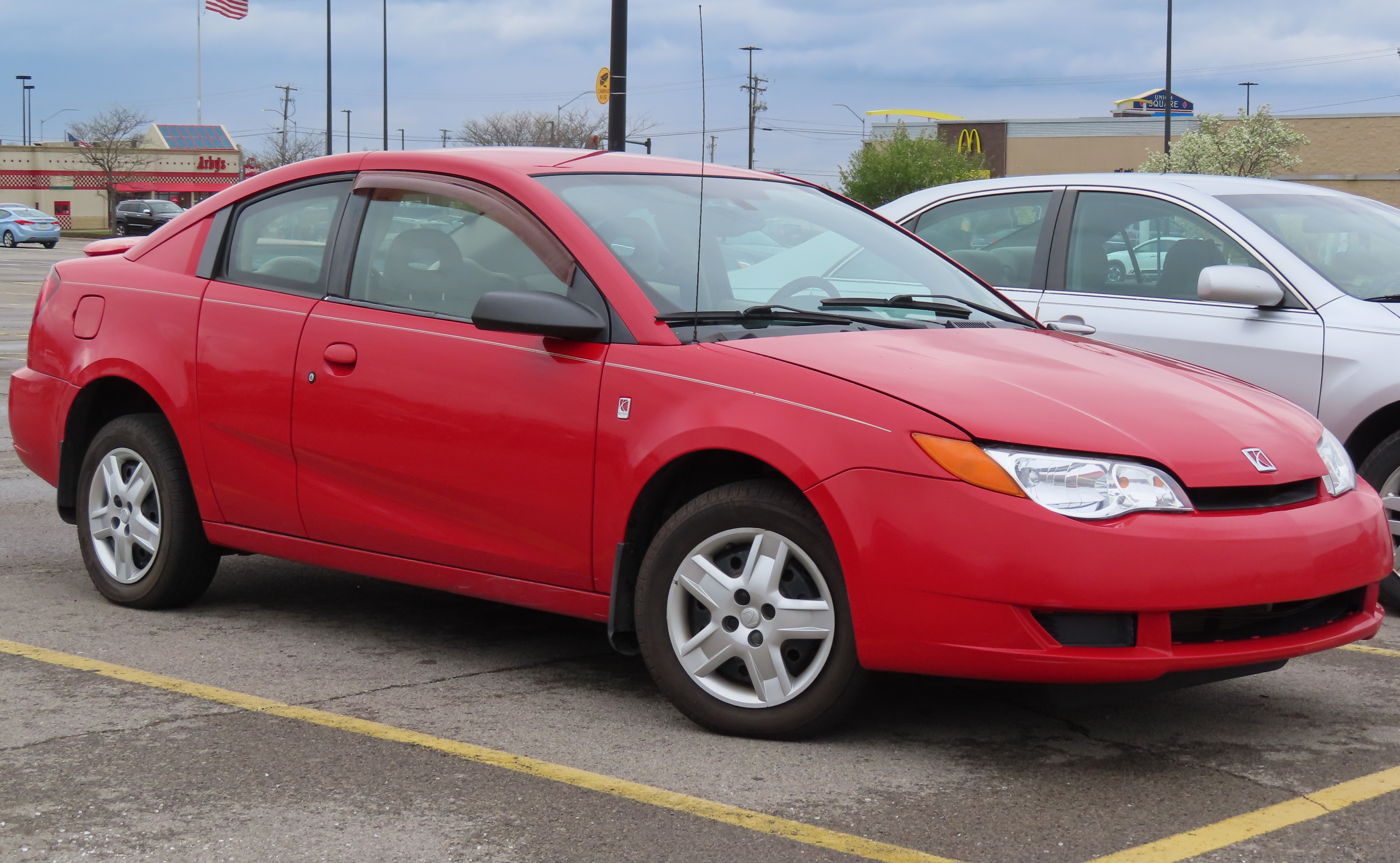
2005–2007 Saturn Ion Quad Coupe

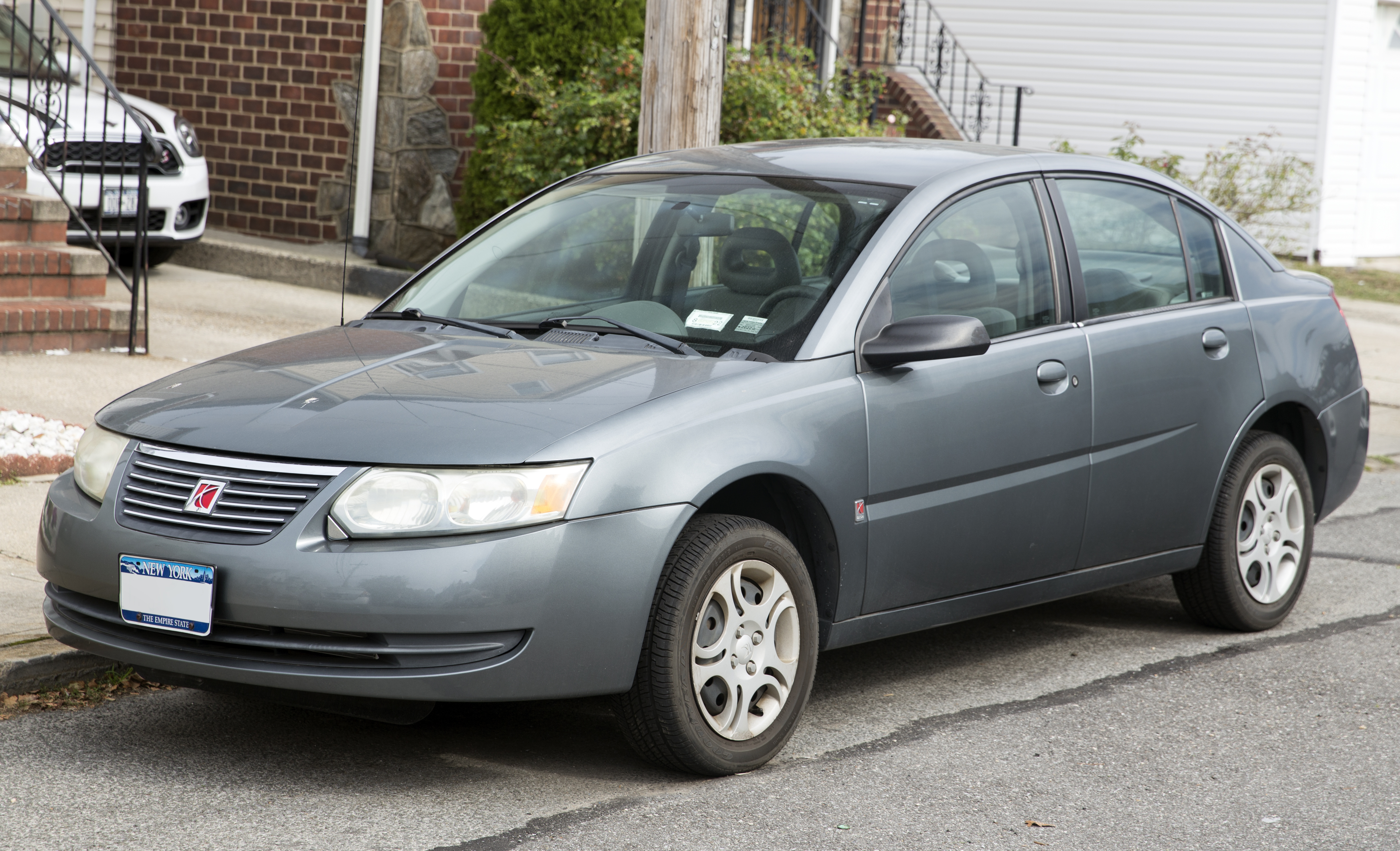
2005 Saturn Ion

In 2005, the Aisin 5-speed automatic transmission was discontinued. The VTi CVT used in the quad-coupes between 2002 and 2004 was also discontinued. GM's 4-speed 4T45-E replaced both transmissions, becoming the only available automatic transmission option. The 2005 Ion sedan models also received a new steering wheel, the same one used in the 2004 Ion coupe models. In the middle of the 2005 model year, the seats in the base Ion1 model received upgraded fabrics and a height adjustment feature. "Quiet Steel" multilaminate sound-reduction technology was also introduced in 2005. Cosmetic changes included an upgraded fascia with a larger grille opening (2005-2007 Ion sedan models) and redesigned wheel covers and redesigned alloy wheel offerings. Under the hood, an acoustic engine cover was added to the engine bay to reduce noise emissions.

The Level 2 and Level 3 models were offered with GM's new standard radio, featuring MP3 playback.

2006 saw the 170 hp (127 kW), 162 lb⋅ft (220 N⋅m) torque, 2.4 L straight-four engine with variable valve timing become available for the Ion 3. The Ion went on to be discontinued after the 2007 model year.

=== 2007 ===
The 2.2-liter Ecotec engine in the 2007 Saturn Ion was improved over the previous year's model: power output increased from 140 hp (104 kW) to 145 hp (108 kW) at 5600 rpm, and torque output increased from 145 lb⋅ft (197 N⋅m) to 150 lb⋅ft (203 N⋅m) at 4200 rpm. The new engine was fitted with the ECU from the 2.4-liter engine.

The 2.4-liter Ecotec received a similar upgrade: power increased by five horsepower to 175 hp (130 kW) at 6500 rpm, and torque increased from 162 lb⋅ft (220 N⋅m) to 164 lb⋅ft (222 N⋅m) at 4800 rpm.

An "Appearance Package" was offered for the 2007 Ion 3 Quad Coupe, including redesigned front and rear bumpers, side moldings, elliptical fog lamps, and a chrome exhaust tip. The Recaro seats in the Red Line version were replaced with black leather-appointed seats, which featured a passenger-sensing system.

The Ion was discontinued after the 2007 model year, and replaced in Saturn's lineup by the Saturn Astra hatchback, a rebadged Opel Astra H imported from Belgium.

The 2007 Ion was the last Saturn built at the Spring Hill, Tennessee plant.

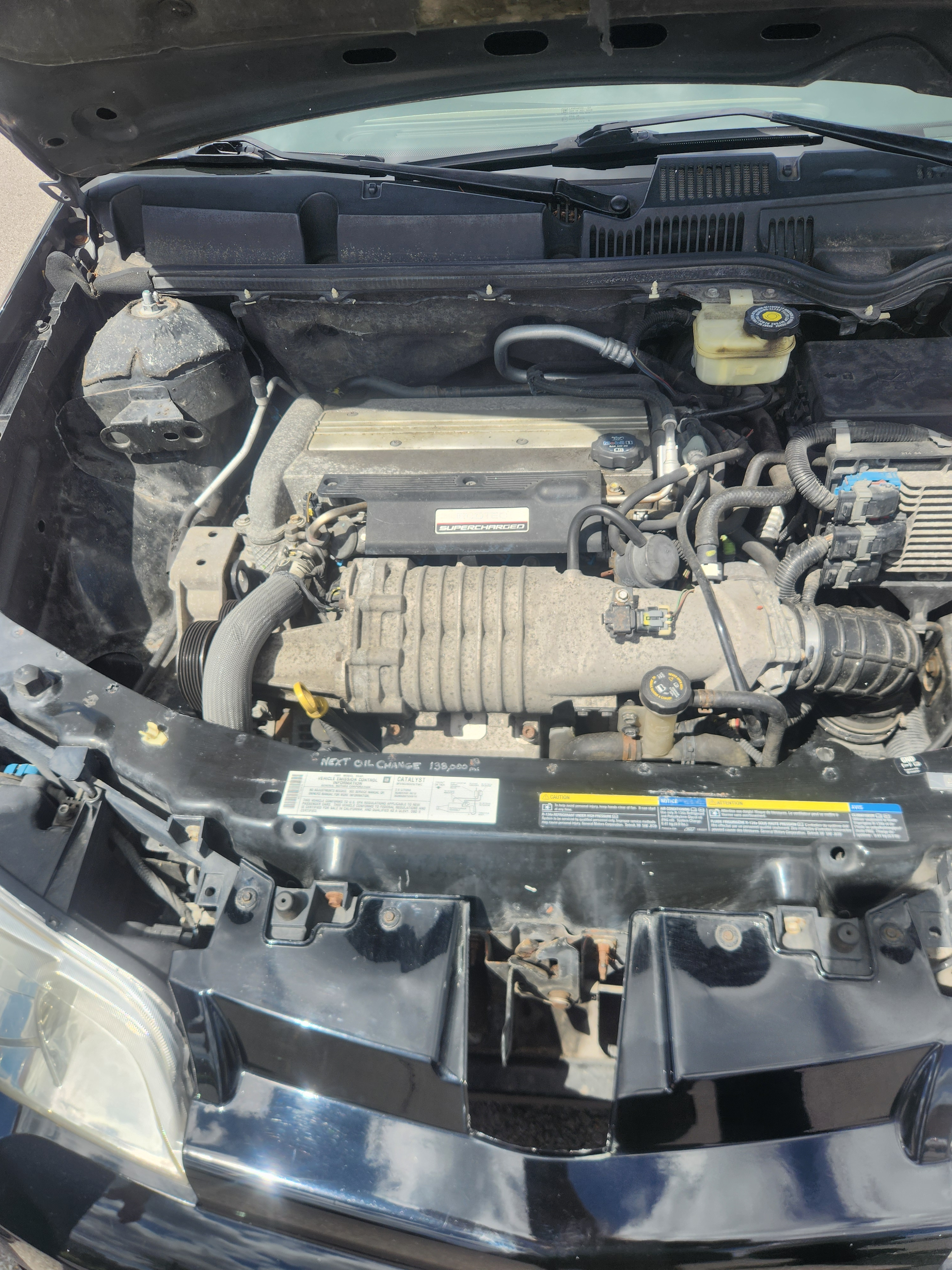
Saturn Ion Red Line engine bay

=== Red Line Edition ===
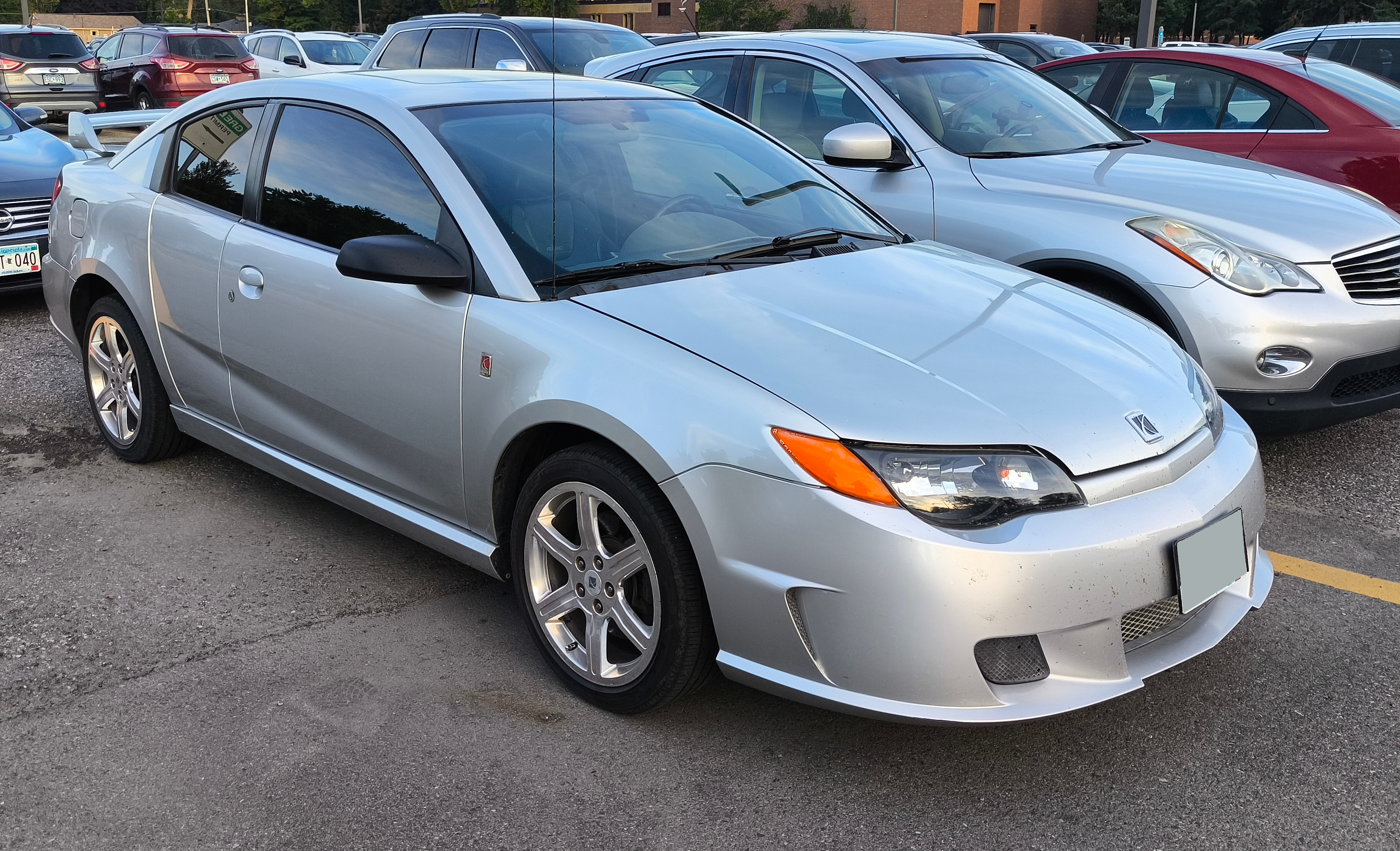
Saturn Ion Red Line

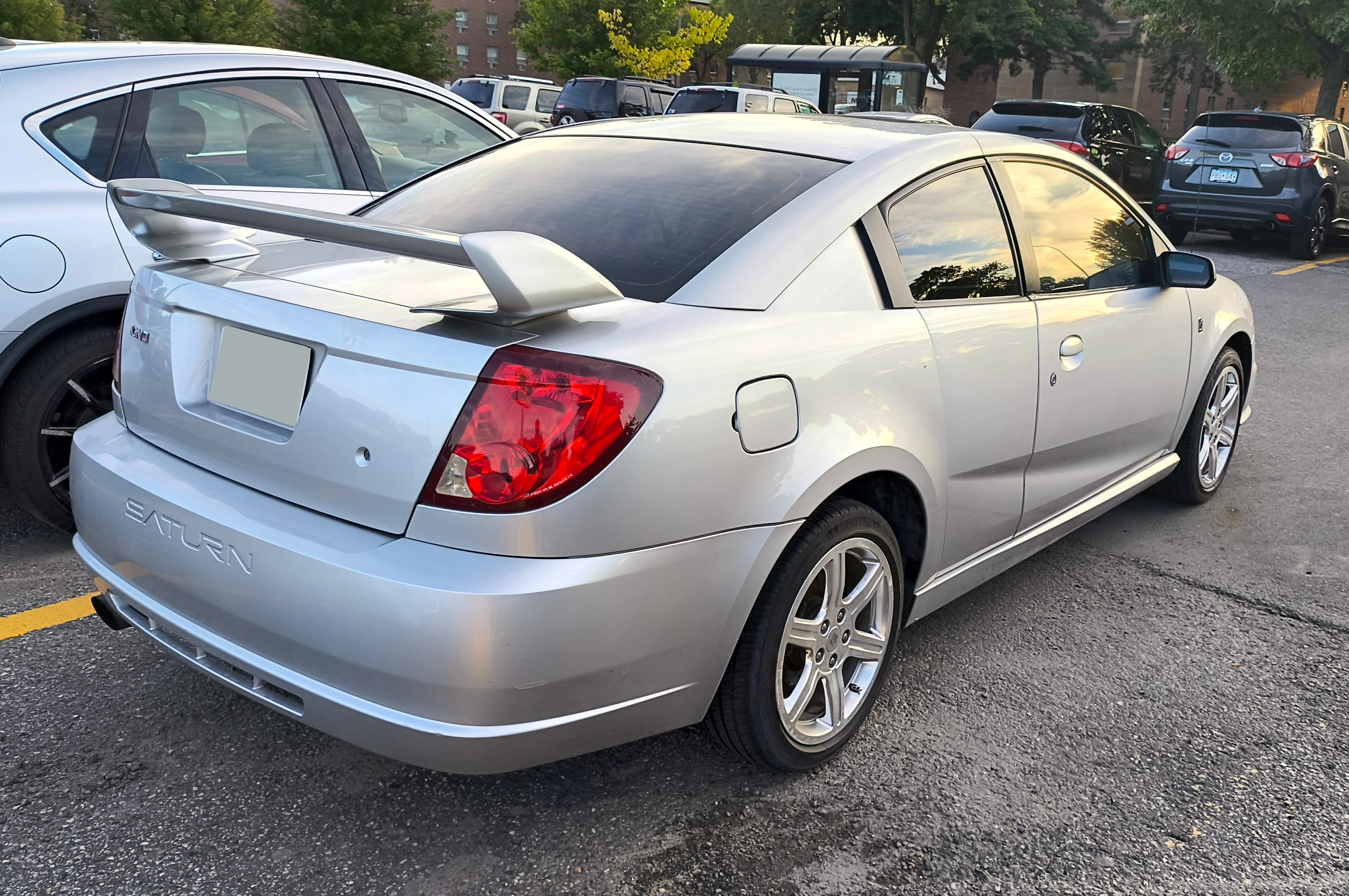
Rear

In production from 2004 through the 2007 Model Year, Saturn produced the Red Line Sport Compact This engine/powertrain combination is also shared with the Chevy Cobalt SS Supercharged Edition, which did not start production until the 2005 model year. The Ion Red Line features most interior features from the standard Ion Coupe, including its rear clamshell doors, to allow accessibility to the rear seat.

Introduced for the 2005 model year was the optional Competition Package. Included in the Competition Package were 17" Gunmetal Painted Alloy Rims, Ladder Tachometer w/ shift lights, a Limited Slip Differential, and Optional Projector-beam Fog Lamps. In mid-2006, GM released two Engine Kit upgrades for both the Ion Red Line and the Cobalt SS. The Stage 1 Kit retailed for around US$500, and included higher-flow fuel injectors and a recalibration to the ECU to increase the horsepower by 31 hp (23 kW) to 236 hp (176 kW) and 205 lb⋅ft (278 N⋅m) of torque, up from the stock 205 hp (153 kW) and 200 lb⋅ft (271 N⋅m). The Stage 2 Kit retailed for around $750 and opens up the middle of the power curve to more power than the Stage 1 Kit alone. In addition to everything that the Stage 1 Kit comes with, the Stage 2 Kit includes a smaller drive belt and pulley for the supercharger, bringing the engine up to 241 hp (180 kW) and 218 lb⋅ft (296 N⋅m) of torque. GM did release a Stage 1 to Stage 2 Upgrade kit that retailed for $400. This Upgrade Kit is for a Red Line with the Stage 1 kit already installed. This Upgrade Kit adds the Stage 2 elements and increases the horsepower from 236 hp (176 kW) to 241 hp (180 kW).

On October 17, 2003 at the Bonneville Salt Flats in Utah, the Saturn Ion Red Line, piloted by the GM Performance Division's "Saturn Land Speed Record Project" set a new land-speed record in the "G/Blown Fuel Altered" Class at 212.684 mph. This exceeded the previous record of 183.086 mph that was set in 2001.

Below are the production numbers for the Ion Red Line from 2004 to 2007.

Color	2004	2005	2006	2007	Totals
Silver	831	353	274	131	1589
Red	0	286	260	116	662
Blue	783	478	189	134	1584
Black	1012	395	406	173	1986
Total	2626	1512	1135	554	5827
Comp. Pkg.	0	118	641	337	1096

=== Discontinuation ===
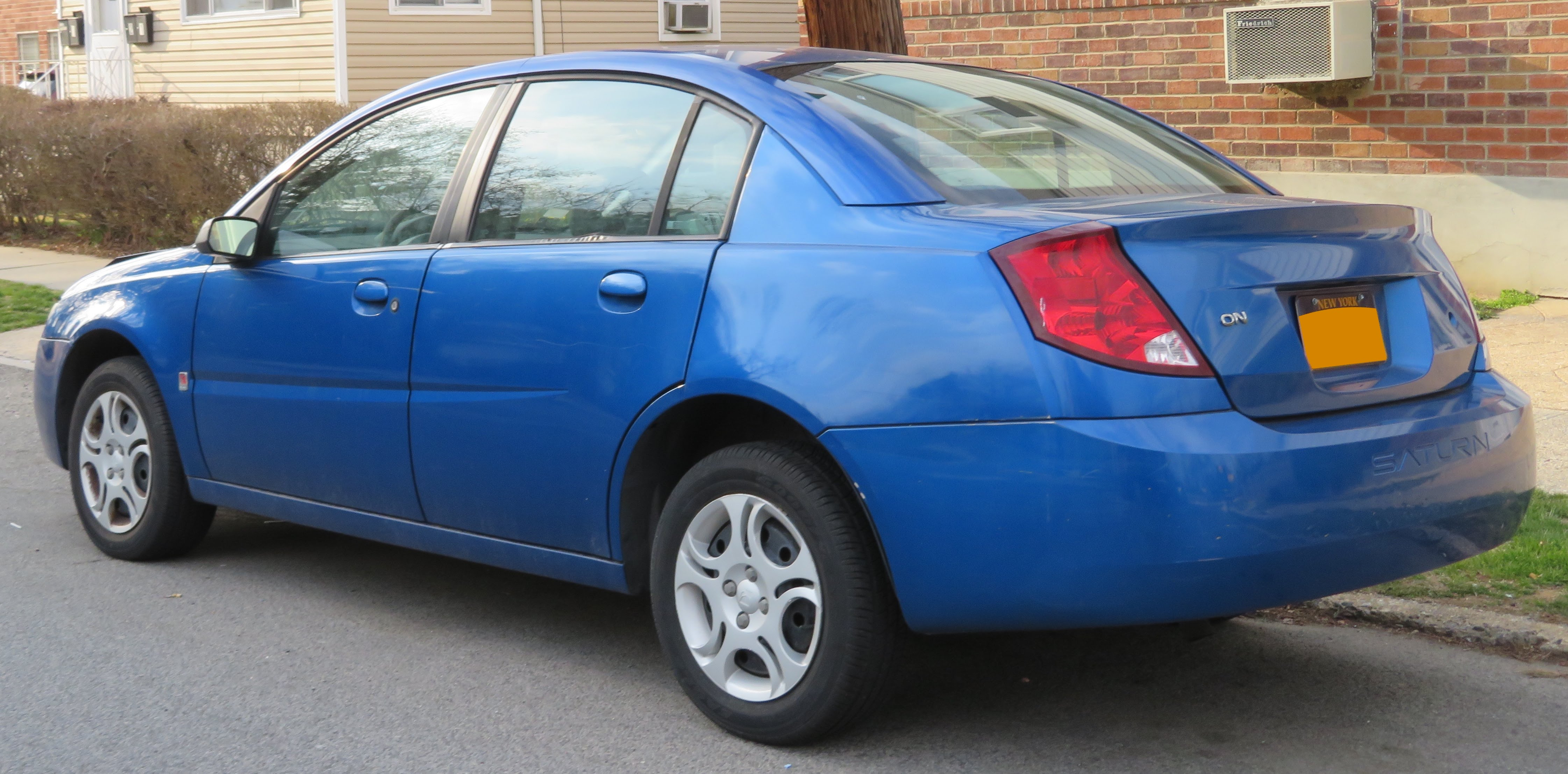
Rear view

General Motors decided to discontinue the Ion after the 2007 model year. It was replaced by the 2008 Astra.

The Astra shares the Delta platform with the Ion, but is a captive import from Opel. While Opel offered the Astra in multiple body types, and with other performance options, Saturn did not import any of them – the Astra was only offered with a single base engine, and in 3-door and 5-door hatchback bodystyles only, in two trim levels. The Ion was the last Saturn to have brand-specific design cues originating with the S-Series such as plastic body panels.

== Safety ==
=== Insurance Institute for Highway Safety (IIHS) ===
2003–2007 Ion IIHS scores
Moderate overlap frontal offset	Acceptable
Small overlap frontal offset	Not Tested
Side impact	Poor
Roof strength	Not Tested

IIHS only tested the 4-door sedan version. It did not test coupe versions of the Ion.

=== NHTSA ===
2003–2007 Ion NHTSA scores
Year	Vehicle Type	Frontal Driver	Frontal Passenger	Side Driver	Side Passenger	4x2 Rollover	4x4 Rollover
2003	4DR Sedan	5/5 stars	5/5 stars	Not Rated	3/5 stars	4/5 stars	Not Rated
2004	4DR Sedan	5/5 stars	5/5 stars	Not Rated	3/5 stars	4/5 stars	Not Rated
2004	4DR Coupe	5/5 stars	5/5 stars	4/5 stars	4/5 stars	Not Rated	Not Rated
2005	4DR Sedan	5/5 stars	5/5 stars	3/5 stars	4/5 stars	4/5 stars	Not Rated
2005	4DR Coupe	5/5 stars	5/5 stars	4/5 stars	4/5 stars	4/5 stars	Not Rated
2006	4DR Sedan	5/5 stars	5/5 stars	3/5 stars	4/5 stars	4/5 stars	Not Rated
2006	4DR Coupe	5/5 stars	5/5 stars	4/5 stars	4/5 stars	4/5 stars	Not Rated
2007	4DR Sedan	5/5 stars	5/5 stars	3/5 stars	4/5 stars	4/5 stars	Not Rated
2007	4DR Coupe	5/5 stars	5/5 stars	4/5 stars	4/5 stars	4/5 stars	Not Rated

=== Recall ===
In February 2014, the Ion was added to a list of General Motors cars recalled due to a faulty ignition switch. 13 deaths were found to have been caused by the defect in Chevrolet Cobalt models, prompting the recall of the Ion and other related GM vehicles.
