= F35 transmission =

Saab-designed five-speed manual transmission

The F35 is a Saab-designed five-speed manual transmission built in Saab’s Gothenburg, Sweden, powertrain plant. This extensively tested manual transmission was originally introduced in the 1984 Saab 9000, and was later used in the Saab 900, 9-3 and 9-5, Saturn Ion Red Line, Chevrolet Cobalt SS, Chevrolet HHR SS and various GM/Opel transverse engine front-wheel drive applications.

== Design ==
The F35 features a two-axis conventional transverse layout, with fully synchronized gears, and compact packaging. It features a higher torque carrying capacity than most manual transmission currently in use by competing North American small cars.

The design was updated in 1994 with synchronized reverse, triple-cone synchronizers on 1st and 2nd gears, and single-cone synchronizers for 3rd, 4th, 5th and reverse gears.

=== Specifications ===
It weighs approximately 99 lb/45 kg and uses 2 quarts/1,9 L of GM 88862472 gear oil. This gear oil is identified in GM documentation as a synthetic 75W-85 GL-4, Castrol Burmah (BOT 0063) manual transmission fluid, and is validated as "fill-for-life". No maintenance is required for normal operation. The gearbox is rated for 260 ft-lb (353 Nm) of engine torque.

The GM transmissions are usually numerically designated in newton metres that means F35 is rated at 350 Nm, the weaker rod shifted SAAB version of the F35, the F25, at 250 Nm, F40 at 400 Nm, M32 at 320 Nm, and so on.

=== Differential ===
A limited-slip differential is available for high-output applications. GM has sourced Quaife's automatic torque biasing (ATB) torque-sensing (Torsen-style) differential, which is an all-mechanical geared unit that uses no clutch packs or preloading to transfer torque from one axle to the other. The torque transfer occurs automatically and gradually when one wheel loses traction. This type of differential can severely reduce the effects of torque-steer.

=== Performance ===
The gearbox has shown to hold more power than the factory stated quite reliably. That being said, a lower geared final drive helps eliminate excessive stress on the gears; thus the 3.82 FD (final drive) is weaker than the 4.05 and the now hard to source 4.45 gearset is the strongest. The transmission can still break, especially with a fast spooling turbo to create a low end boost spike. The most common gear to break is third, and commonly a boost ramp is tuned in to help prolong the stock transmission. In general, the transmission will hold up better if the boost comes in later so it is not a sudden surge of power. Wheel hop is a killer of transmissions and axles, creating excessive stress as the wheels load and unload.

3.61 final drive is used on Saab 9000 2,3l engines with turbocharger, other final drive rations used on early cars is 4,21, 4,05, 3,82 and 4,45 (non turbo).

== Versions ==
Different versions of the transaxle are available depending upon the application. Both cable and rod shift mechanisms are available, as well as application-specific clutch housings. The MU3 and MC2 are differentiated by ratios, with the MC2 available with a lower top-gear ratio.

MC2 gear ratios:

Final Drive	1	2	3	4	5	R
3.82	3.38	1.76	1.18	0.89	0.70	3.17

MU3 gear ratios:

Final Drive	1	2	3	4	5	R
4.05	3.38	1.76	1.18	0.89	0.70	3.17

== Applications ==
- 1985-1998 Saab 9000 (F25)
- 2004-2007 Saturn ION Red Line (MU3)
- 2005-2007 Chevrolet Cobalt SS Supercharged (MU3)
- 2008-2010 Chevrolet Cobalt SS Turbocharged (MU3)
- 2008-2010 Chevrolet HHR SS Turbocharged (MU3)
- 1994-1998 Saab 900 (F25)
- 1998-2003 Saab 9-3 (F25, Viggen with F35 differential)
- 1998-2009 Saab 9-5 (F25, with F35 differential)
- 2003-2006 Saab 9-3 (F35)
- 2013-present Senova D Series (F25, with F35 differential)
