= Sport compact =

American car classification

Sport compact examples

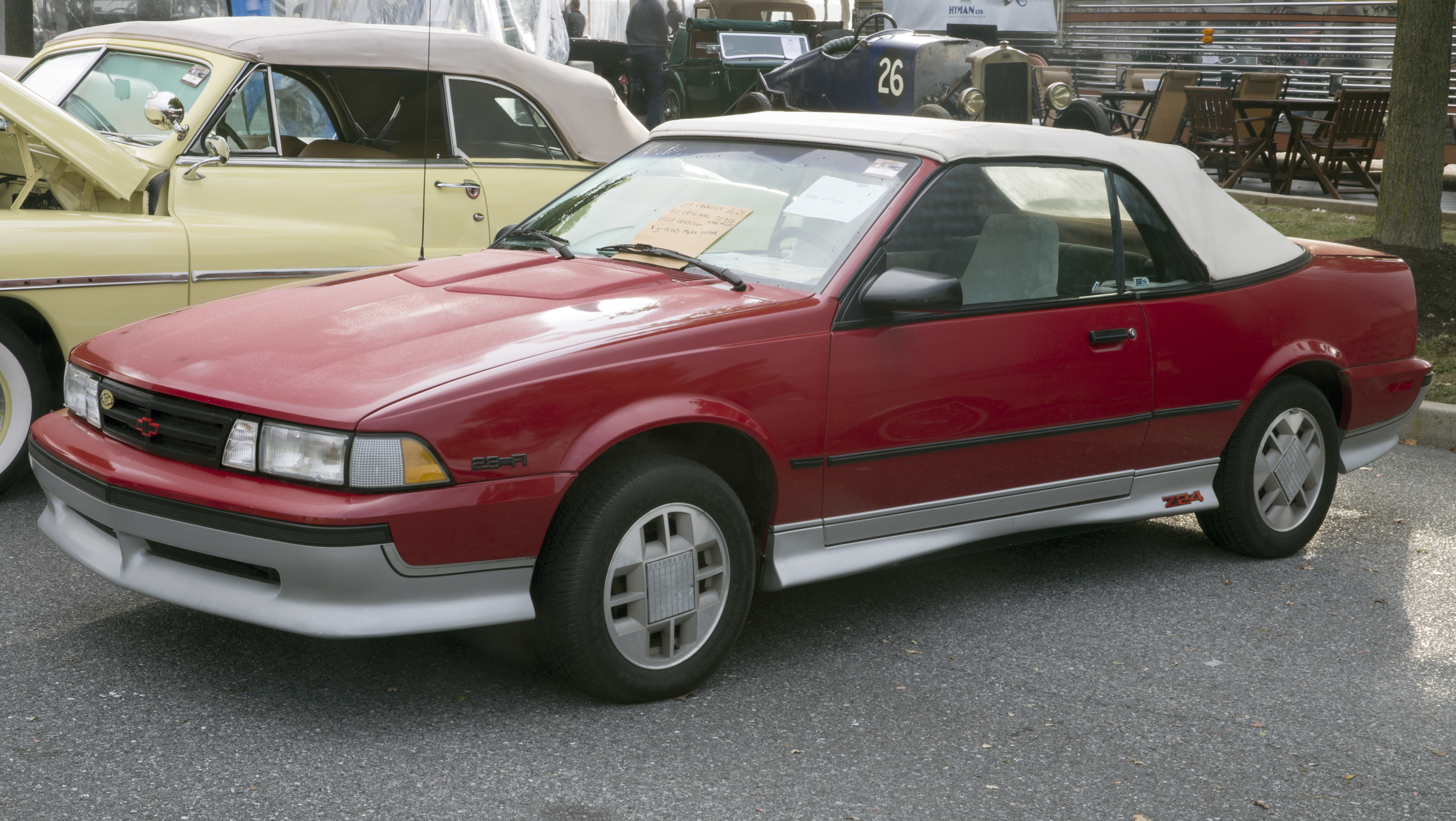
Chevrolet Cavalier Z24 (1988–1994)

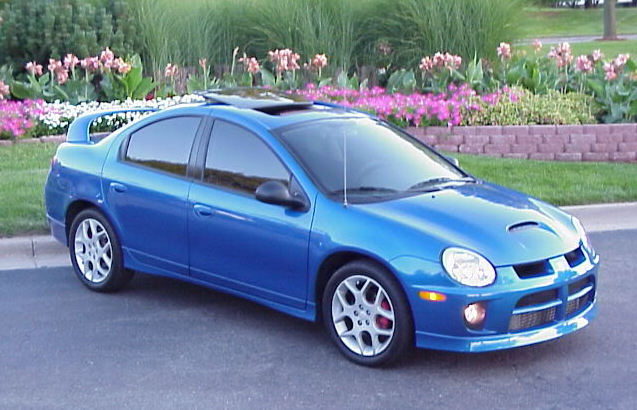
Dodge Neon SRT-4 (2003–2005)

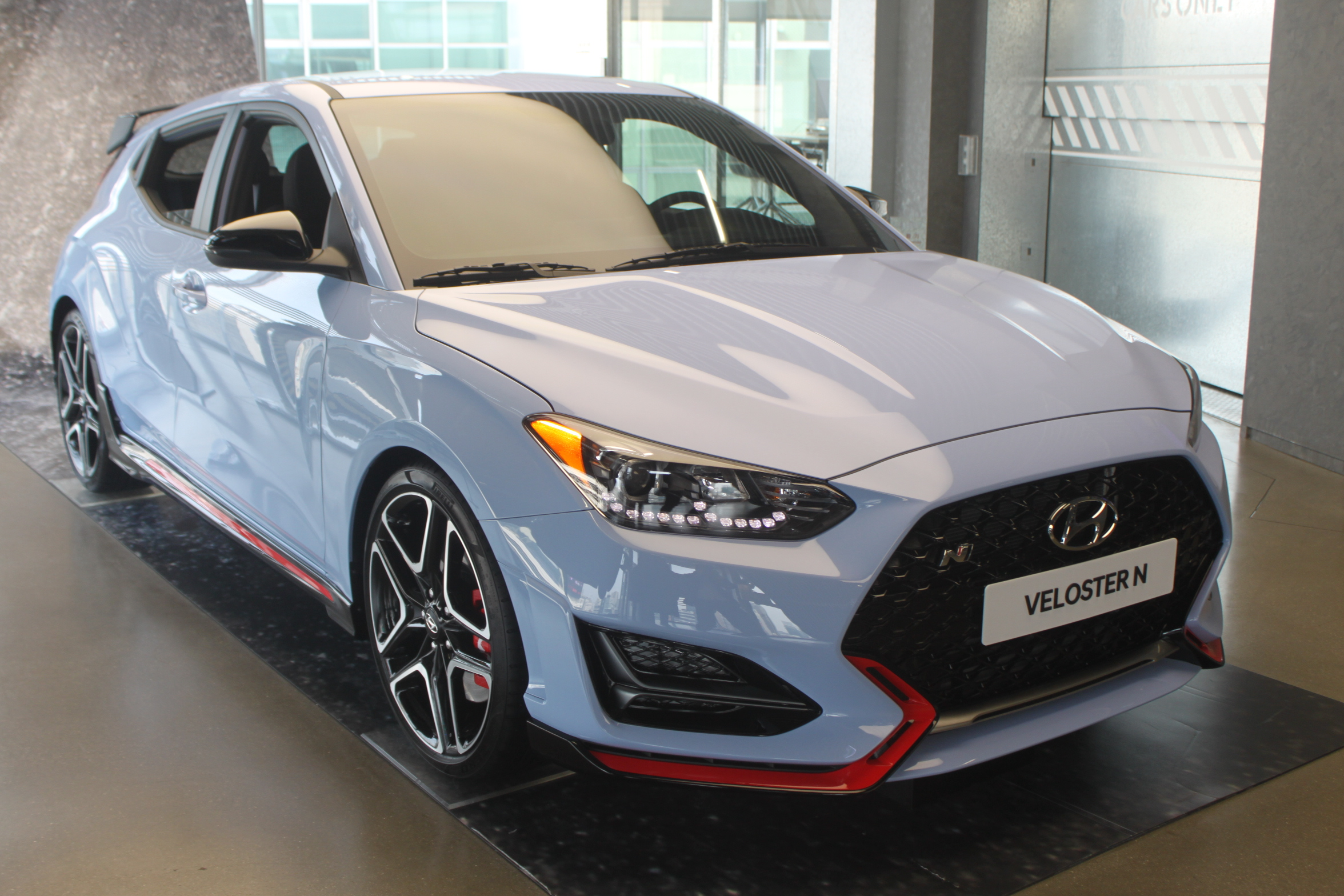
Hyundai Veloster N (2019–2022)

Sport compact is a United States marketing classification for a high-performance version of a compact or a subcompact car. There is no precise definition, and the description is applied to various models for promotional purposes.

Cars began to be marketed as sport compacts in the mid-1980s to describe the option packages on American-built coupes. Since then, it has also been used for standalone sports car models and cars imported from Europe and Asia.

The European equivalent is a hot hatch. However, sport compacts are not limited to hatchback body styles.

== Characteristics ==
A sports compact should "fulfill the multiple duties of a family car, plaything, and daily driver". Many sports compacts have coupe, sedan, or hatchback body styles built on mass-production platforms. Other common (but not essential) characteristics include front-wheel or all-wheel drive, a four-cylinder internal-combustion engine, suspension tuned for handling, and bodywork designed to improve aerodynamics or allow for larger wheels.

"Econosport" is a rarely used term for a sports version of a small economy car.

== History ==
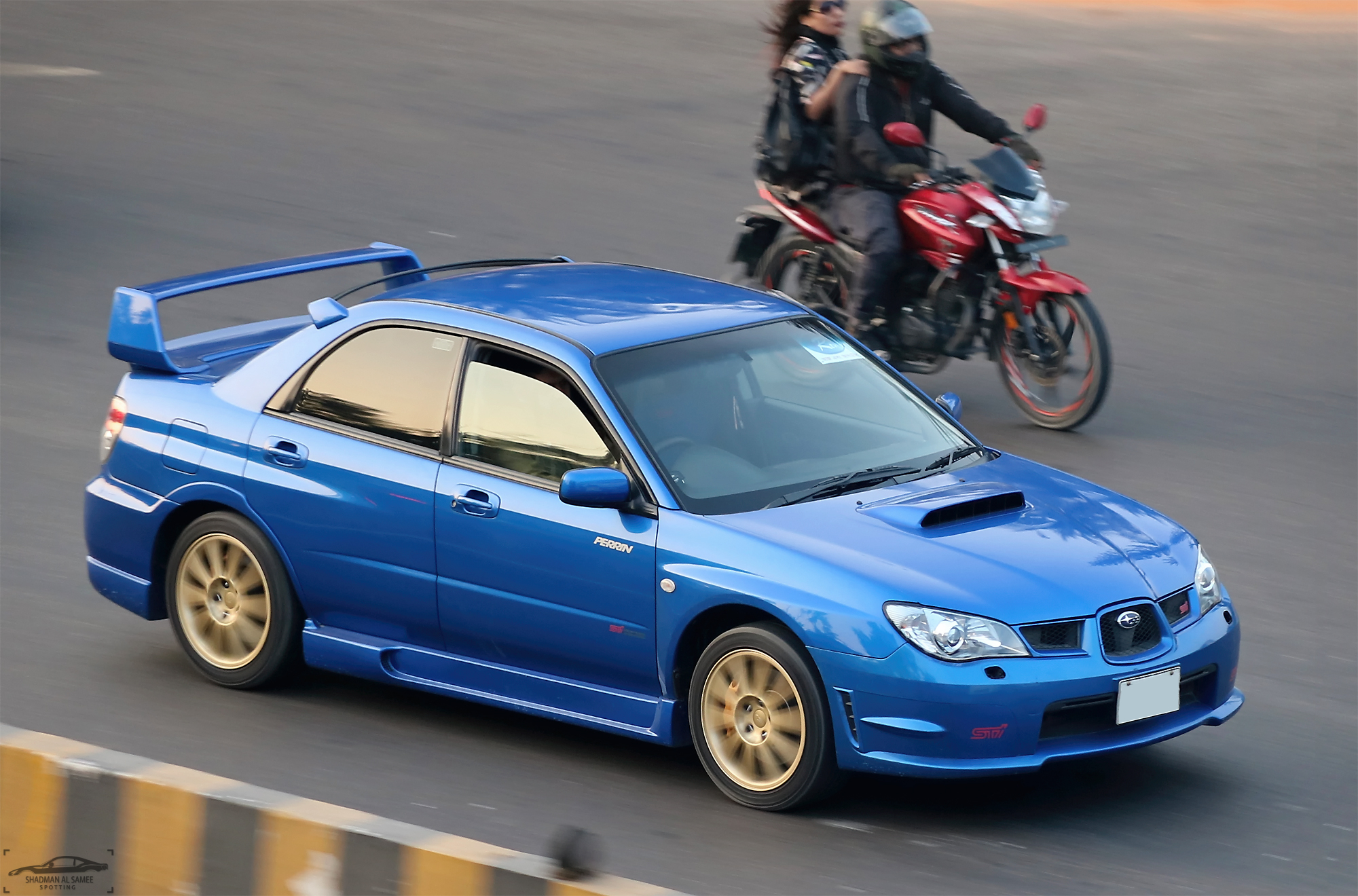
Subaru Impreza WRX STI (2004–2007)

An early sport compact was the 1968 Ford Capri, a European coupe built on the platform of the second-generation Ford Cortina sedans.

The early American-built sport compact models contained optional performance or sporting packages for mass-produced compact coupes in the 1980s. Examples include the 1986 Chevrolet Cavalier Z24, the 1986 Ford EXP Sport Coupe, the 1987 Renault Alliance GTA, and the 1988 Plymouth Sundance. These models achieved moderate sales. Sport compact models gained greater prominence by the mid-1990s, sold in significant numbers in models such as the 1993 Ford Probe (based on the Mazda MX-6 platform), and the 1995 Chevrolet Cavalier/Pontiac Sunfire badge-engineered twins.

Sports compacts of the 2000s include the 2001-2003 Ford ZX2, the 2004-2007 Saturn Ion Red Line, the 2005-2010 Chevrolet Cobalt SS, and the 2003-2005 Dodge Neon SRT-4.

European hot hatches are considered 'sport compact' cars in the North American market. Examples include the 1976–present Volkswagen Golf GTI and the 2000–present Mini Cooper. Similarly, most Japanese hot hatches and sports coupes are classified as 'sport compact' cars when sold in North America, for example, the 1984–present Honda Civic Si, 2007-2013 Mazdaspeed3, and the 2012-present Toyota 86.

== Motorsport ==
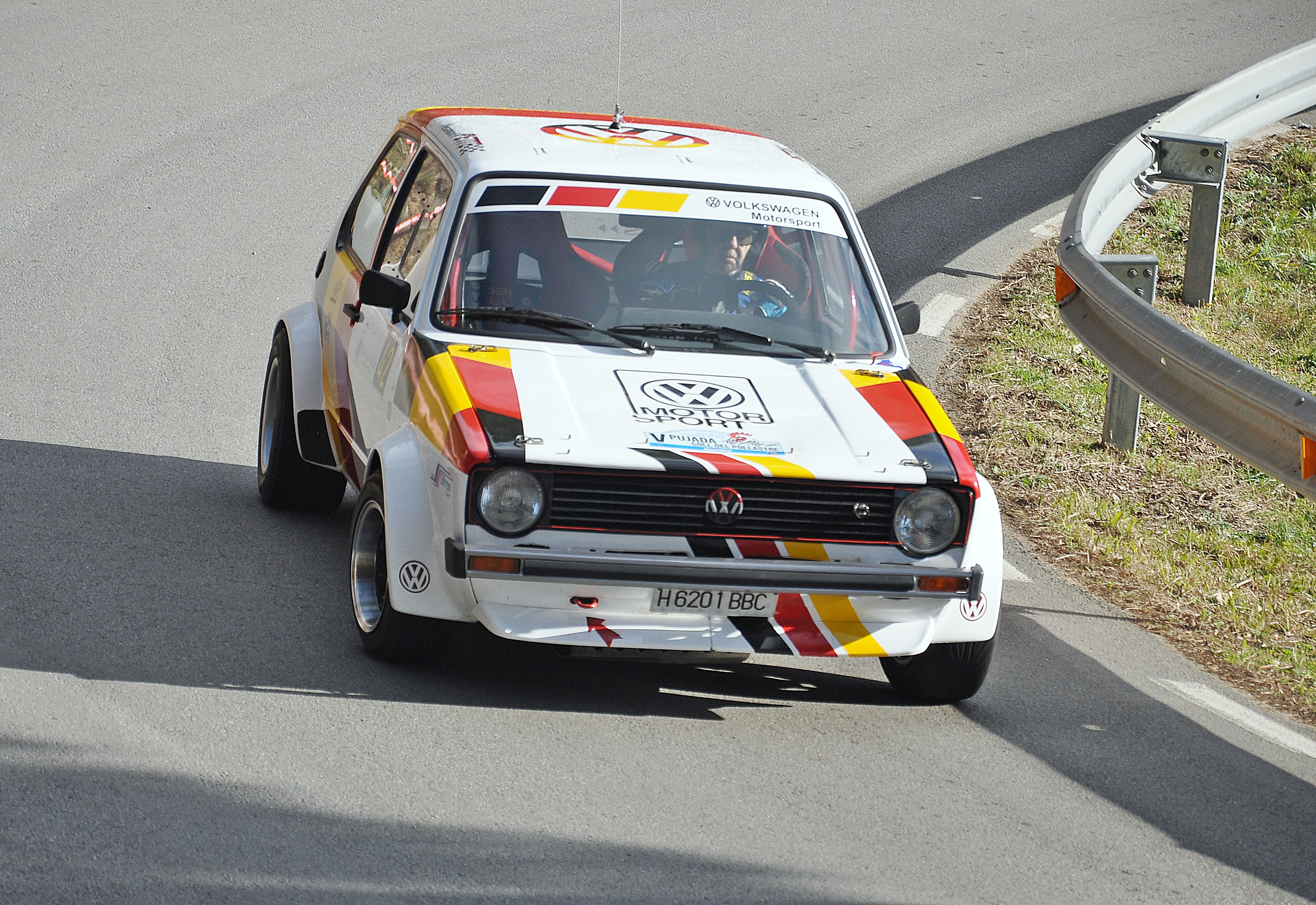
Volkswagen Golf I in competition

Sport compact cars are often used in motorsport events because they are relatively lightweight. They are used to compete in various types of motorsport, including autocross, rallying, rallycross, touring car racing, drifting, and drag racing.

From 2005 through 2012, the International Sport Compact Auto Racing Series was an American stock car racing series for sports compacts that mostly raced on paved oval racetracks.

== See also ==
- Car classification
- Hot hatch
- Sports sedan
- Sports car
