= Chevrolet HHR =

Compact station wagon

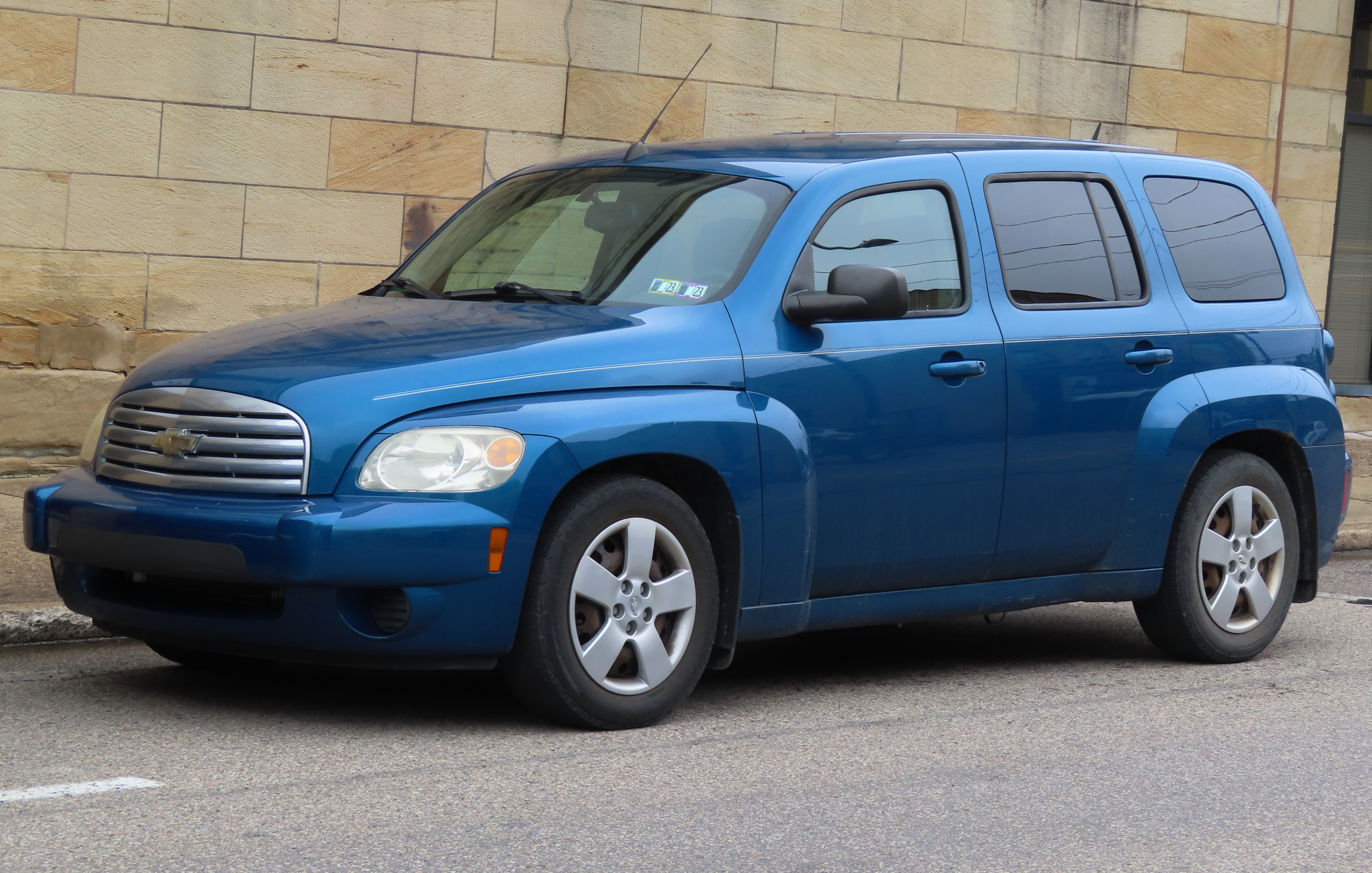

Overview
- Manufacturer: General Motors
- Production: 2005–2011
- Model years: 2006–2011
- Assembly: Mexico: Ramos Arizpe, Coahuila (Ramos Arizpe Assembly)
- Designer: Bryan Nesbitt

Body and chassis
- Class: Compact (HHR); Sedan delivery (HHR Panel)
- Body style: 5-door station wagon 5-door panel wagon
- Layout: Front-engine, front-wheel-drive
- Platform: GM Delta platform/GMT001

Powertrain
- Engine: 2.0 L (120 cu in) Ecotec LNF turbo I4; 2.2 L (130 cu in) Ecotec L61 I4; 2.4 L (150 cu in) Ecotec LE5 I4
- Transmission: 5-speed F35 (MU3) manual 5-speed Getrag F23 manual 4-speed 4T45 automatic

Dimensions
- Wheelbase: 2,630 mm (103.5 in)
- Length: 4,475 mm (176.2 in); SS: 4,480 mm (176.4 in)
- Width: 1,755 mm (69.1 in)
- Height: 1,605 mm (63.2 in); SS: 1,590 mm (62.6 in)

The Chevrolet HHR (an initialism for Heritage High Roof) is a retro-styled, high-roofed, five-door, five-passenger, front-wheel drive wagon designed by Bryan Nesbitt and launched by the American automaker Chevrolet at the 2005 Los Angeles Auto Show as a 2006 model.

The HHR shares the GM Delta platform with the Chevrolet Cobalt, Pontiac G5, and Saturn Ion. Chevrolet also marketed a panel van variant of the HHR beginning in 2007. Assembled in Ramos Arizpe, Mexico and marketed throughout North America, production of the HHR ended in May 2011.

== Design ==
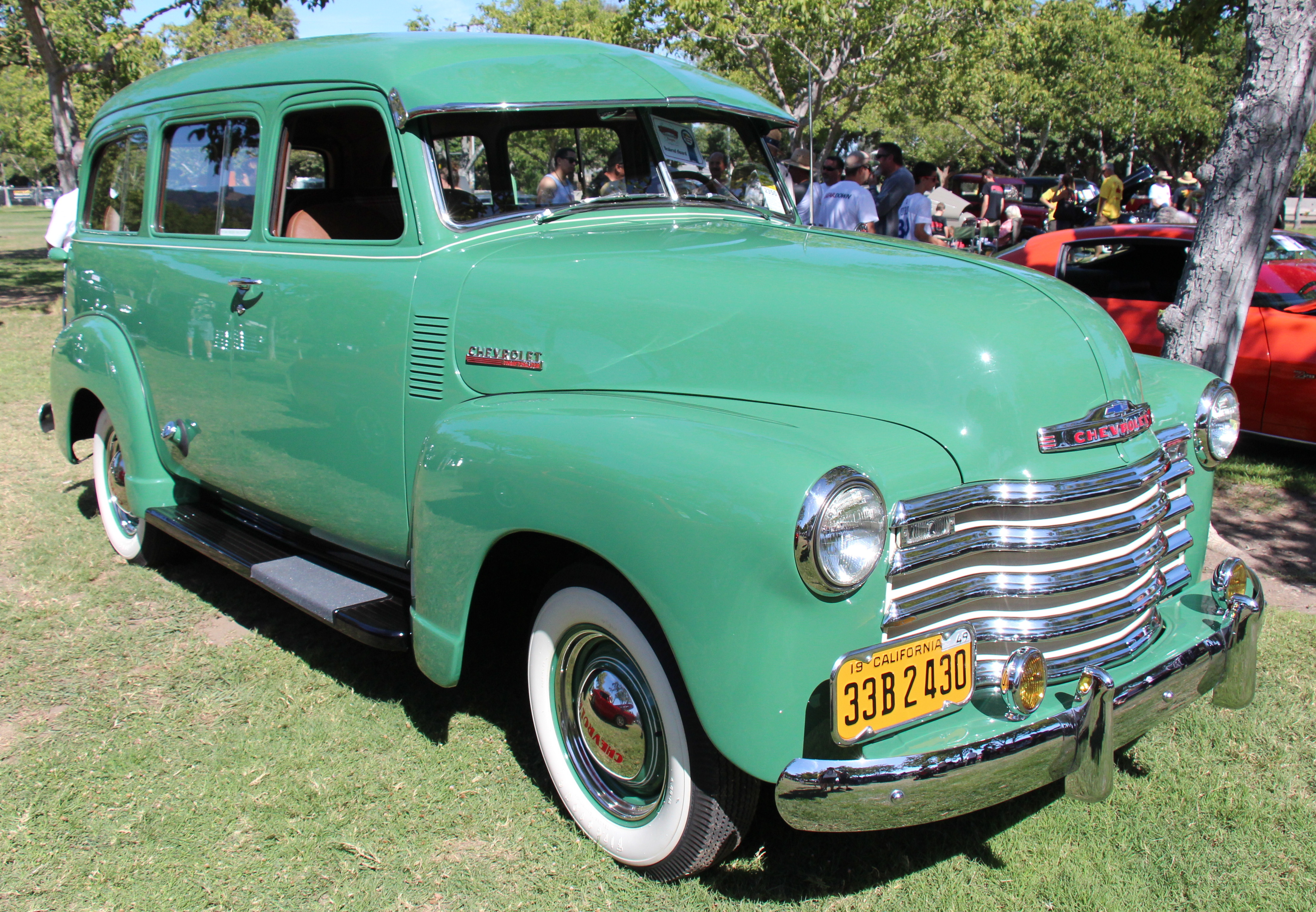
The design of the HHR was modeled after the 1947–1953 Chevrolet Suburban.

The HHR's design was inspired by the late-1940s/early 1950s Chevrolet cars and trucks, specifically the 1947 Chevrolet Suburban and Advance Design pickups, with large, square, flared fenders and a semicircular grille. The design of the HHR has been credited to Bryan Nesbitt who was a former designer at Chrysler, where he was the lead designer of the Chrysler PT Cruiser. Nesbitt was recruited by GM to join its design staff and served for a time as the chief designer of the Chevrolet brand. The HHR had a cargo-carrying capacity of 62.7 cubic feet (1.78 m^{3}). All models had a flat-load floor (passenger models have 60/40 split bench) and fold-flat front passenger seat. For the 2007 model year, it was available in four trim levels; LS, LT, 2LT, and Special Edition. A panel van variant was also made available in 2007 for only the LT trim and became available on all trim levels in 2008. A "Half Panel" (RPO code AA5) rear quarter window delete option was available in the 2008 to 2010 model years.

== Features ==
Every HHR came equipped standard with power windows and door locks (front for the HHR Panel and front and rear for the standard HHR), dual front SRS airbags, a Driver Information Center, an A/M-F/M stereo radio with a single-disc CD/MP3 player and an auxiliary audio input jack, a four-speaker audio system, a tilt-adjustable steering wheel, keyless entry, cloth seating surfaces, a folding rear bench seat (for standard HHR models only), manually-adjustable dual (front) bucket seats, a compact spare tire and wheel, air conditioning, and a five-speed manual transmission. Upper trim levels added features such as a multifunction steering wheel, a cruise control system, aluminum-alloy wheels (which were also polished on some models), a remote vehicle starter system (for vehicles equipped with a four-speed automatic transmission only), a single-pane power moonroof, a leather-wrapped steering wheel, the OnStar in-vehicle telematics system, front side seat-mounted SRS airbags, XM satellite radio, a Bluetooth hands-free telephone system which also included OnStar, and an ABS braking system.

The HHR could also be ordered with amenities (depending upon the trim level selected), such as a power-adjustable front driver's seat, a Pioneer seven-speaker premium audio system with an external amplifier and rear cargo area-mounted subwoofer, luxury leather-trimmed seating surfaces with dual heated front seats, front-mounted fog lamps, power-adjustable and heated exterior side mirrors, and a six-disc, in-dash CD/MP3 changer with USB integration.

== HHR Panel ==
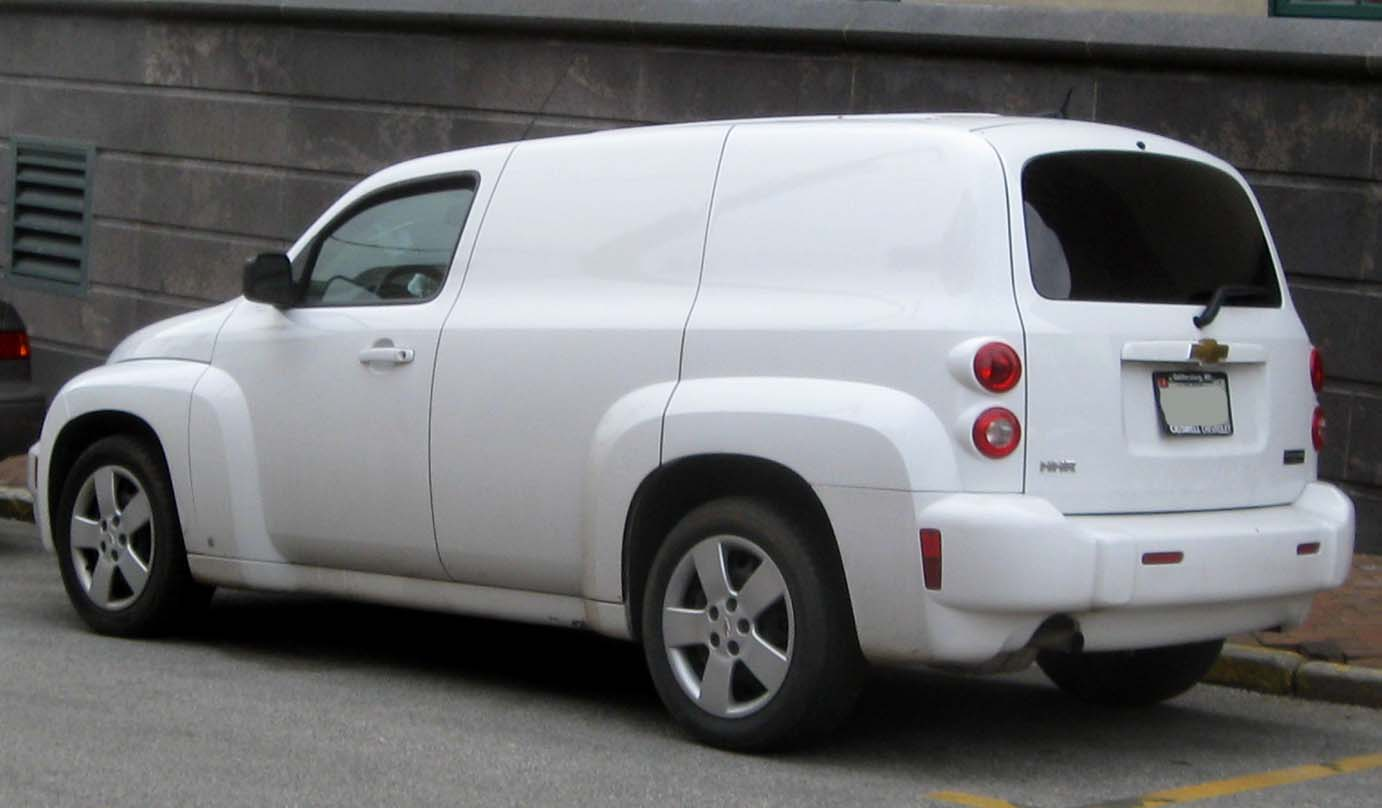
Chevrolet HHR Panel

Between 2007 and 2011, Chevrolet offered a four-door panel van version of the HHR called the HHR Panel. Initially offered in LS, 1LT, and 2LT models with either a 2.2-liter or a 2.4-liter EcoTec Inline four-cylinder gasoline engine and a five-speed manual transmission, the HHR Panel featured a rear cargo management system in place of the standard HHR's rear split bench seat, deletion of the rear seatbelts and side SRS airbags, a plastic cargo floor in place of the standard HHR's rear carpeting, the deletion of the rear carpeted floor mats (HHR Panels still included front passenger area carpeting and carpeted floor mats), and plastic panels in place of the standard HHR's rear door and quarter windows (the rear tailgate window of the standard HHR remained in place, and could still be ordered with a rear window defroster). The rear exterior door handles were removed, though the rear doors could still be opened from the interior of the vehicle. The HHR Panel can be distinguished from a standard HHR by a 'PANEL' emblem on the left side of the rear tailgate.

For the 2009 model year, Chevrolet introduced a panel van version of the HHR SS Turbocharged model, which included a 2.0L EcoTec turbocharged inline four-cylinder (I4) gasoline engine and a five-speed manual transmission. This model was only offered for a single model year, having been discontinued in 2010 along with the standard HHR SS Turbocharged model.

== Assembly and sales ==
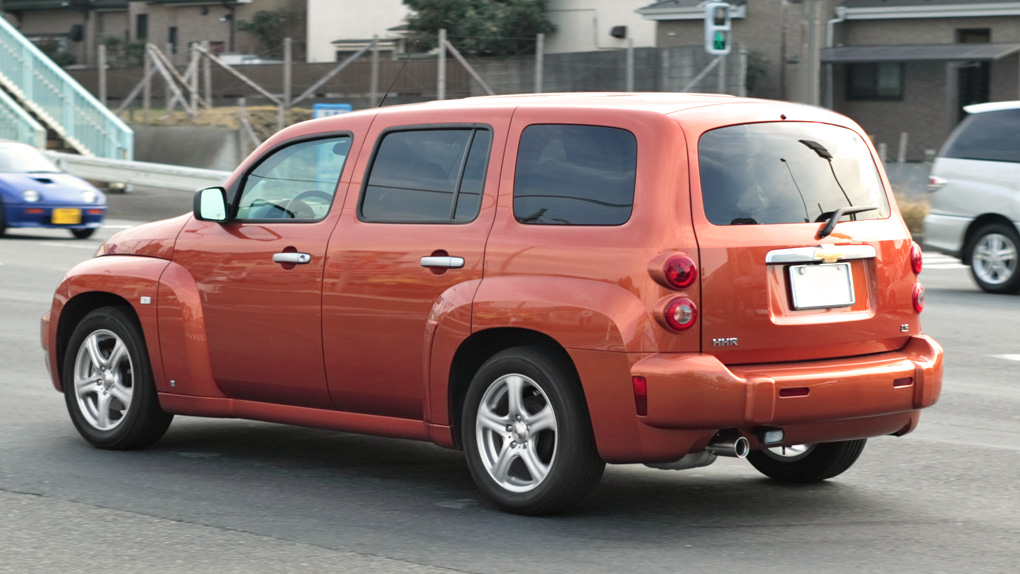
Chevrolet HHR (Japanese version)

The HHR was assembled in Ramos Arizpe, Mexico, and was available for sale throughout North America. The HHR was also exported to Japan by way of the motor vehicles business unit of Mitsui. First year sales exceeded 93,000 through June 2006. The HHR was partially sold in Europe and was replaced by the Chevrolet Orlando. In early 2009, the HHR was discontinued from the Mexican lineup due to poor sales.

== SS Turbocharged ==
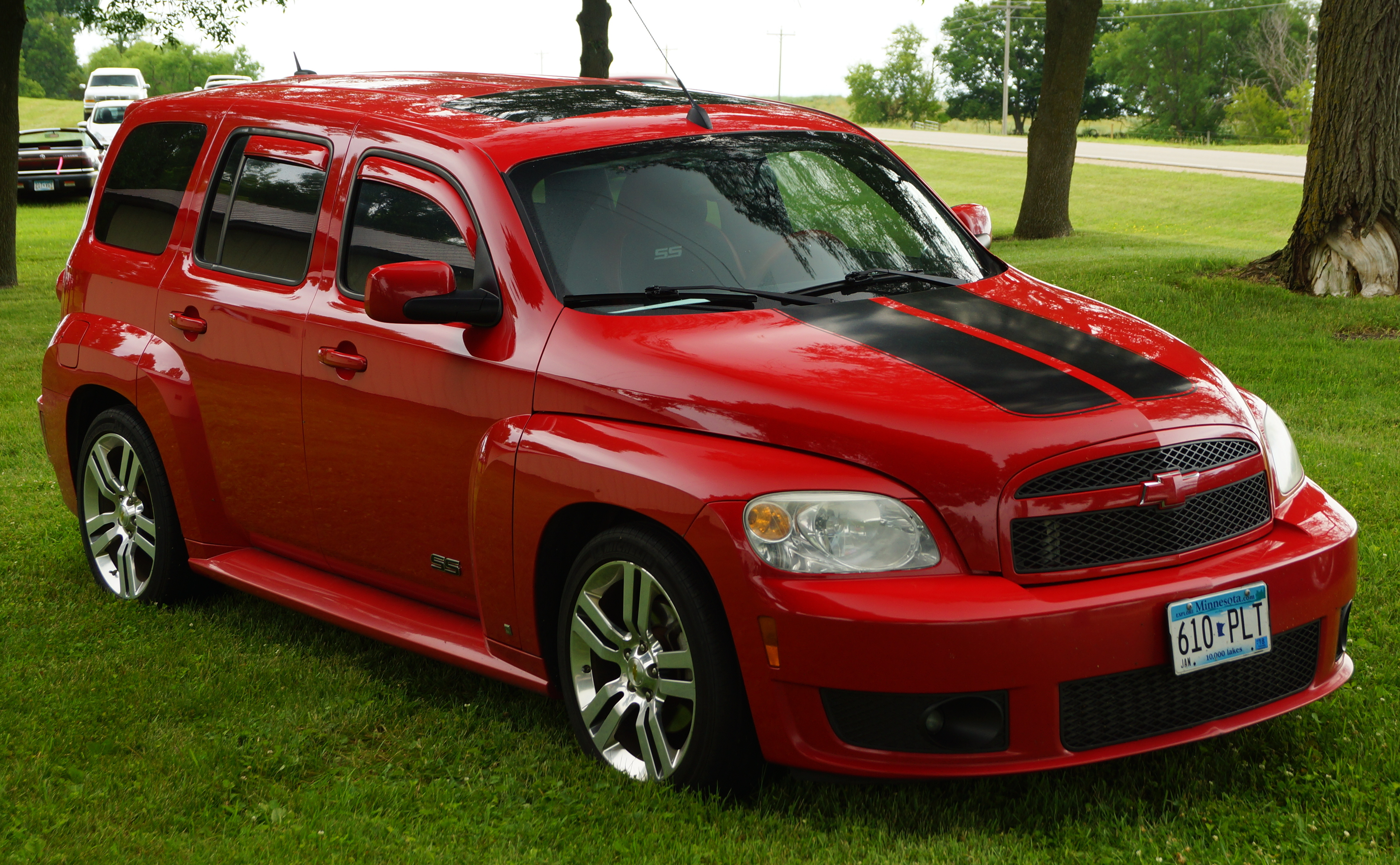
2008 Chevrolet HHR SS

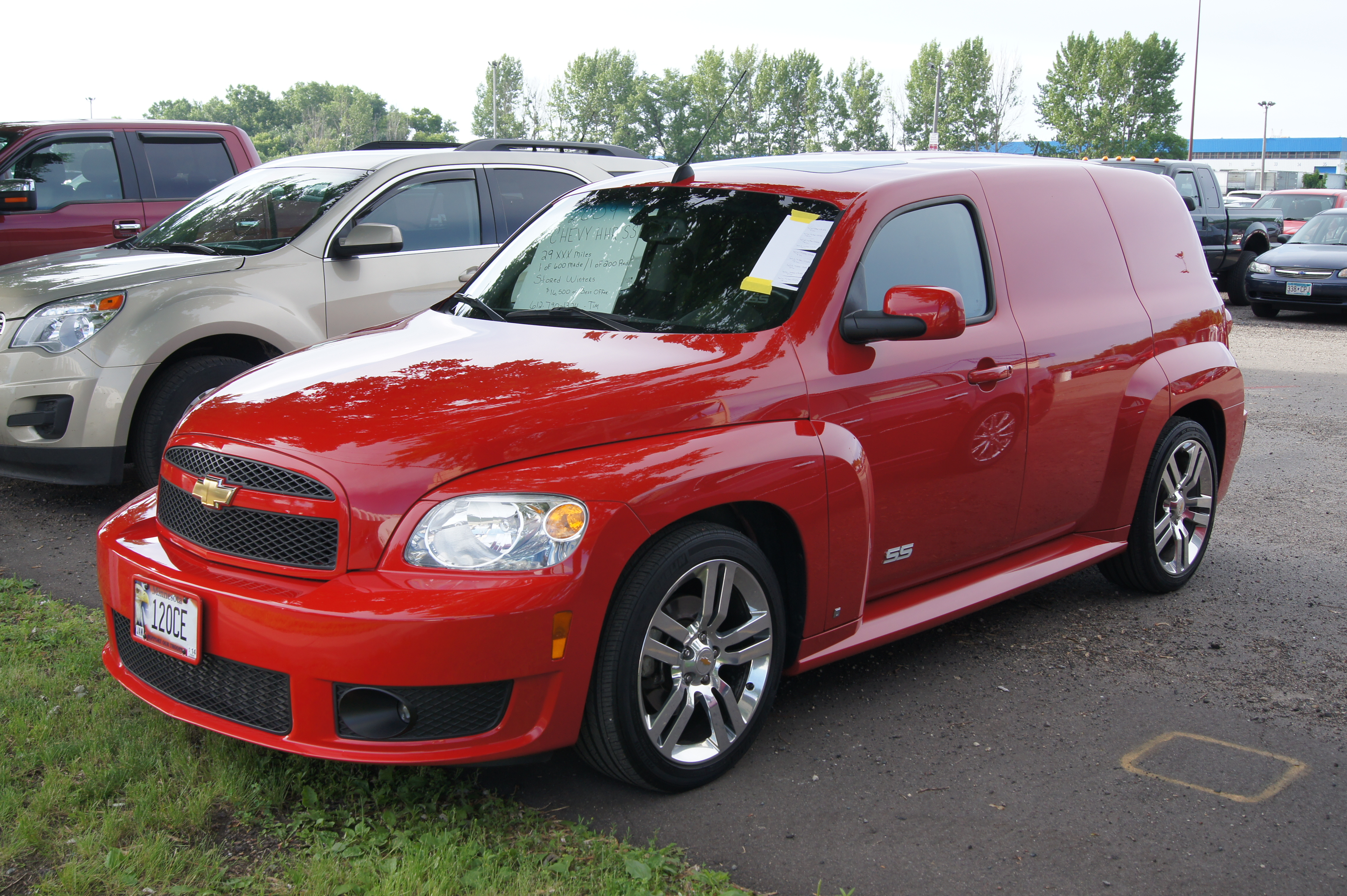
2009 Chevrolet HHR SS Panel

In October 2006, Cheryl Catton, director of car marketing and retail integration for Chevy, confirmed that a high-performance variant of the HHR would be built. The vehicle was expected to be released with SS moniker for the 2008 model year and use the Ecotec LNF turbocharged engine found in the Pontiac Solstice GXP and Saturn Sky Red Line.

On August 16, 2007, Chevrolet officially revealed the 2008 Chevrolet HHR SS Turbocharged at the Woodward Dream Cruise in Birmingham, Michigan. It was created by GM's Performance Division and introduced as a 2008 model in the fall of 2007. The SS Turbocharged features a 2.0 L (120 cu in) turbocharged Ecotec LNF I4 engine and intercooler that produces 260 bhp (194 kW) (235 bhp (175 kW) with the optional 4-speed automatic), race-tuned high-performance suspension, five-speed manual transmission with short-throw shifter, standard four-wheel antilock disc brakes, ground effects with unique front and rear fascias, aggressive black cross-mesh grille, liftgate-mounted aero spoiler, an analog A-pillar-mounted titanium boost gauge, leather-wrapped steering wheel with mounted audio controls, and unique 18 in (460 mm) high-polished aluminum wheels.

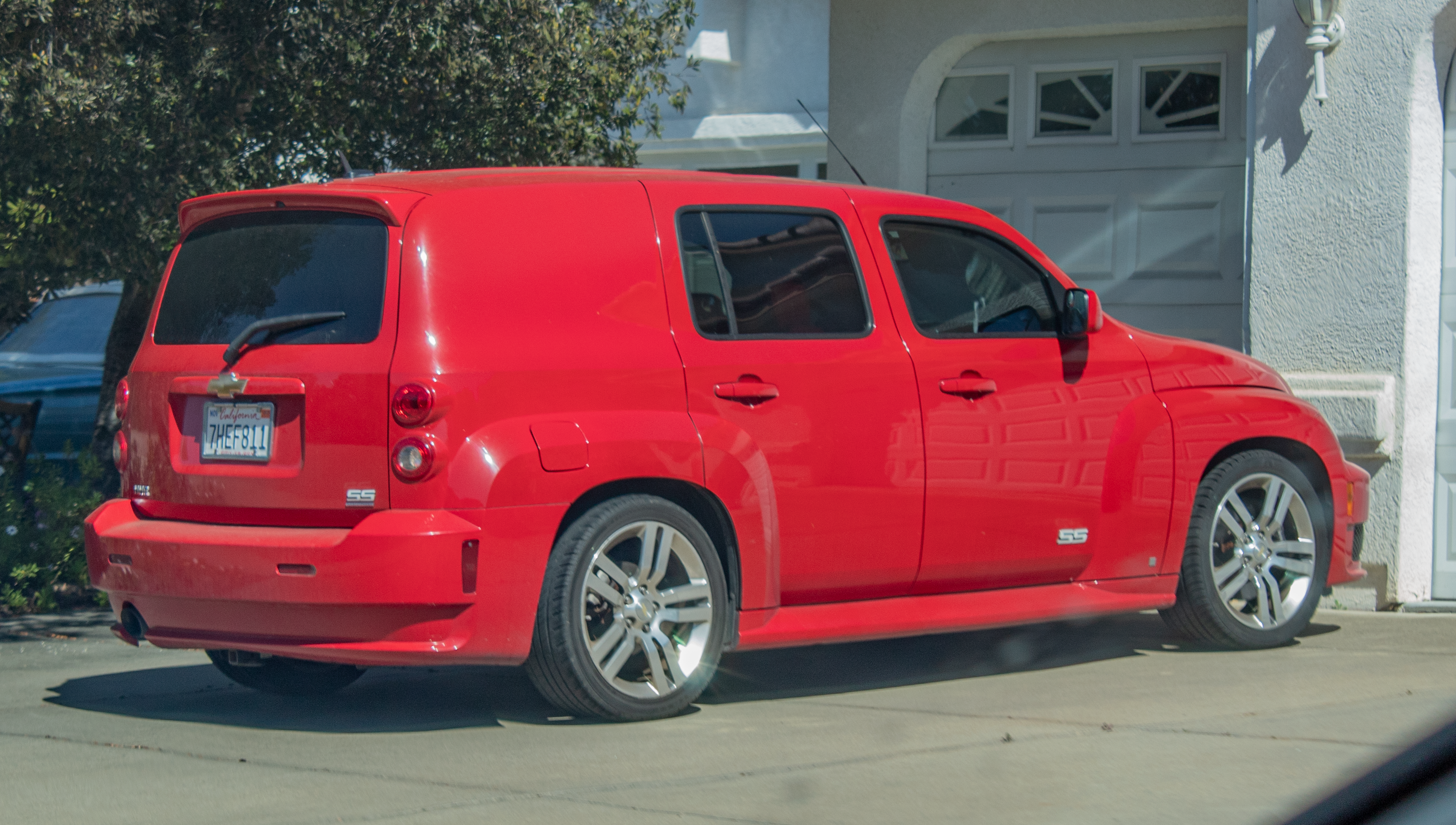
Chevrolet HHR SS Half Panel

Chevrolet also introduced the HHR SS Panel Concept on October 30, 2007, at the 2007 SEMA Show. This was made into a production model for the 2009 model year.

The SS model was removed from the market after the 2010 model year due to the shuttering of the GM Performance Division, also known as the GM High Performance Vehicle Operations (HPVO) Group. In addition, GM phased out all GM badges from the front doors for the 2010.5 model year, including the Chevrolet HHR.

In the fourth quarter of 2010, Chevrolet announced that the HHR would be discontinued after the 2011 model year, with the last HHRs available in dealerships starting in late January to early February. HHRs were also available for fleet order until May 2011.

== Year-to-year changes ==
- 2007: HHR Panel launched. Intended for commercial use, the rear side windows & rear seat are deleted & additional floor storage is offered. The 2.4 LE5 engine was retuned for more power while retaining the same fuel economy. The 2.2L L61 engine received some significant internal upgrades including a higher-strength Gen II block and revised cylinder head (enlarged exhaust ports) and camshaft design (increased exhaust valve duration). The engine also switched from wasted spark ignition to individual coil-on-plug ignition. Upgraded engine was controlled by new 32-bit ECM (E37). These changes increase horsepower slightly and retain similar fuel economy. Ebony interior now available.
- 2008: New "SS" model introduced. "Half Panel" RPO code AA5, rear quarter window delete, option added. Tire pressure monitoring system now standard (except in Canada). GM's OnStar was also now included with every model. Electronic stability control is available as an option. Four new exterior colors available. GM introduced a "stage 2" performance package for the HHR SS (similar to what was available to the Solstice GXP and Sky Red Line with their upgrade). After installing the electronic modification and 3-bar MAP sensors, the HHR SS would output 290 hp (216 kW) and 315 lb⋅ft (427 N⋅m) of torque, which was a significant increase from the factory output, though significantly less in torque output than the equivalent options offered for the Solstice and Sky.
- 2009: Flex-Fuel (E85) was added to the 2.2 and 2.4 engines. The 2.2 engine now comes with Variable Valve Timing (VVT).The interior was slightly changed: power window control switches were relocated from the lower center dashboard to the more traditional driver-side door; interior overhead lighting was improved; AM/FM stereo with USB port was now optionally available on LT/SS models. Side curtain airbags & electronic stability control is now standard across all models (except in Canada).
- 2010: GM phased out all GM badges from the front doors halfway through the model year (2010.5). 3 new paint colors added (8 total), down from 10 color options in 2009. Side curtain airbags & electronic stability control is now standard for Canadian models. Last year for "Half Panel" RPO code AA5, rear quarter window delete option.
- 2011: SS model discontinued. Cashmere interior removed from options.

== Engines ==
Year	Trim	Engine	Power	Torque	EPA (2008) City	EPA (2008) HW	EPA (2008) Comb.
2006	LS/LT	2.2L (134 cu in) Ecotec L61 I4	143 bhp (107 kW)	150 lb⋅ft (203 N⋅m)	21 mpg_{‑US} (11 L/100 km; 25 mpg_{‑imp})	28 mpg_{‑US} (8.4 L/100 km; 34 mpg_{‑imp})	23 mpg_{‑US} (10 L/100 km; 28 mpg_{‑imp})
2006	LT/2LT	2.4L (145 cu in) Ecotec LE5 I4	172 bhp (128 kW)	162 lb⋅ft (220 N⋅m)	20 mpg_{‑US} (12 L/100 km; 24 mpg_{‑imp})	28 mpg_{‑US} (8.4 L/100 km; 34 mpg_{‑imp})	23 mpg_{‑US} (10 L/100 km; 28 mpg_{‑imp})
2007	LS/LT	2.2L (134 cu in) Ecotec L61 I4	149 hp (111 kW)	152 lb⋅ft (206 N⋅m)	20 mpg_{‑US} (12 L/100 km; 24 mpg_{‑imp})	28 mpg_{‑US} (8.4 L/100 km; 34 mpg_{‑imp})	23 mpg_{‑US} (10 L/100 km; 28 mpg_{‑imp})
2007	LS/2LT	2.4L (145 cu in) Ecotec LE5 I4	175 bhp (130 kW)	165 lb⋅ft (224 N⋅m)	21 mpg_{‑US} (11 L/100 km; 25 mpg_{‑imp})	28 mpg_{‑US} (8.4 L/100 km; 34 mpg_{‑imp})	23 mpg_{‑US} (10 L/100 km; 28 mpg_{‑imp})
2008	LS/LT	2.2L (134 cu in) Ecotec L61 I4	149 hp (111 kW)	152 lb⋅ft (206 N⋅m)	22 mpg_{‑US} (11 L/100 km; 26 mpg_{‑imp})	30 mpg_{‑US} (7.8 L/100 km; 36 mpg_{‑imp})	25 mpg_{‑US} (9.4 L/100 km; 30 mpg_{‑imp})
2008	LT/2LT	2.4L (145 cu in) Ecotec LE5 I4	172 hp (128 kW)	167 lb⋅ft (226 N⋅m)	22 mpg_{‑US} (11 L/100 km; 26 mpg_{‑imp})	28 mpg_{‑US} (8.4 L/100 km; 34 mpg_{‑imp})	24 mpg_{‑US} (9.8 L/100 km; 29 mpg_{‑imp})
2008	SS	2.0L (122 cu in) turbo Ecotec LNF I4	260 bhp (194 kW)	260 lb⋅ft (353 N⋅m)	21 mpg_{‑US} (11 L/100 km; 25 mpg_{‑imp})	29 mpg_{‑US} (8.1 L/100 km; 35 mpg_{‑imp})	24 mpg_{‑US} (9.8 L/100 km; 29 mpg_{‑imp})
2009	LS/LT	2.2L (134 cu in) Ecotec LE8 I4	149 hp (111 kW)	152 lb⋅ft (206 N⋅m)	22 mpg_{‑US} (11 L/100 km; 26 mpg_{‑imp})	30 mpg_{‑US} (7.8 L/100 km; 36 mpg_{‑imp})	25 mpg_{‑US} (9.4 L/100 km; 30 mpg_{‑imp})
2009	LT/2LT	2.4L (145 cu in) Ecotec LE9 I4	172 hp (128 kW)	167 lb⋅ft (226 N⋅m)	22 mpg_{‑US} (11 L/100 km; 26 mpg_{‑imp})	28 mpg_{‑US} (8.4 L/100 km; 34 mpg_{‑imp})	24 mpg_{‑US} (9.8 L/100 km; 29 mpg_{‑imp})
2009	SS	2.0L (122 cu in) turbo Ecotec LNF I4	260 bhp (194 kW)	260 lb⋅ft (353 N⋅m)	21 mpg_{‑US} (11 L/100 km; 25 mpg_{‑imp})	29 mpg_{‑US} (8.1 L/100 km; 35 mpg_{‑imp})	24 mpg_{‑US} (9.8 L/100 km; 29 mpg_{‑imp})
2010	LS/LT	2.2L (134 cu in) Ecotec LE8 I4	149 hp (111 kW)	152 lb⋅ft (206 N⋅m)	22 mpg_{‑US} (11 L/100 km; 26 mpg_{‑imp})	30 mpg_{‑US} (7.8 L/100 km; 36 mpg_{‑imp})	25 mpg_{‑US} (9.4 L/100 km; 30 mpg_{‑imp})
2010	LT/2LT	2.4L (145 cu in) Ecotec LE9 I4	172 hp (128 kW)	167 lb⋅ft (226 N⋅m)	22 mpg_{‑US} (11 L/100 km; 26 mpg_{‑imp})	28 mpg_{‑US} (8.4 L/100 km; 34 mpg_{‑imp})	24 mpg_{‑US} (9.8 L/100 km; 29 mpg_{‑imp})
2010	SS	2.0L (122 cu in) turbo Ecotec LNF I4	260 bhp (194 kW)	260 lb⋅ft (353 N⋅m)	21 mpg_{‑US} (11 L/100 km; 25 mpg_{‑imp})	29 mpg_{‑US} (8.1 L/100 km; 35 mpg_{‑imp})	24 mpg_{‑US} (9.8 L/100 km; 29 mpg_{‑imp})
2011	LS/LT	2.2L (134 cu in) Ecotec LE8 I4	149 hp (111 kW)	152 lb⋅ft (206 N⋅m)	22 mpg_{‑US} (11 L/100 km; 26 mpg_{‑imp})	30 mpg_{‑US} (7.8 L/100 km; 36 mpg_{‑imp})	25 mpg_{‑US} (9.4 L/100 km; 30 mpg_{‑imp})
2011	LT/2LT	2.4L (145 cu in) Ecotec LE9 I4	172 hp (128 kW)	167 lb⋅ft (226 N⋅m)	22 mpg_{‑US} (11 L/100 km; 26 mpg_{‑imp})	28 mpg_{‑US} (8.4 L/100 km; 34 mpg_{‑imp})	24 mpg_{‑US} (9.8 L/100 km; 29 mpg_{‑imp})

Flex-Fuel (E85) was added to the 2.2 & 2.4 engines for the 2009 model year; these were the first four-cylinder Flex-Fuel engines from GM in North America.

== Safety ==
In Insurance Institute for Highway Safety (IIHS) tests, the HHR received a "Good" overall score in the frontal offset crash test, and an "Acceptable" score in side impacts on models equipped with side curtain airbags. Side curtain airbags became standard for 2008 models. However, side torso airbags were never made available.

== Sales ==
Calendar Year	U.S.	Mexico
2005	41,011	954
2006	101,298	4,092
2007	105,175	3,254
2008	96,053	1,132
2009	70,842	147
2010	75,401	
2011	37,012	
2012	21	
Total	526,813	9,579

== See also ==
- Chevrolet SSR
