= Getrag F23 transmission =

Italian 5-speed manual transmission

The F23 is a five-speed manual transmission manufactured by Getrag in Italy. It is designed for transverse engine applications, primarily by General Motors. It can handle torque inputs of over 230 newton-metres (170 lbf⋅ft).

This transmission came in 3 different bellhousing patterns, (Metric bellhousing, Ecotec and Quad 4)

The F23 has one roll pin, two gearsets on each of three parallel shafts – the input shaft, the output shaft, and the intermediate shaft. This three-shaft (also called three-axis) design results in a very short axial length for better packaging. There are three separate shift fork shafts, which hold three shift forks to activate the synchronizer rings for the two gearsets on each of the three gear shafts. The shift forks are activated by a cable system. The clutch release bearing is operated by a concentric slave cylinder that surrounds the input shaft in the clutch housing. A concentric slave cylinder allows more linear clutch feel than an external lever-actuated clutch and release bearing. The input shaft carries the 3rd and 4th gear synchronizer, the intermediate shaft carries the 1st and 2nd gear synchronizer, and the output shaft carries the 5th and reverse gear synchronizer. The aluminium case contains a conventional final drive gearset.

There are sintered bronze double-cone blocker rings on the synchronizers for 1st and 2nd gears, while 3rd and 4th gears use carbon fiber blocker rings, and 5th and Reverse gears use molybdenum on their synchronizers. Carbon and molybdenum are extremely durable friction surfaces that remain stable even under extreme heat.

In the U.S. market, General Motors uses the F23 in two versions (with several application variations): the M86/M94 and MG3. 2000-02 Chevrolet Cavalier 2001-02 Oldsmobile Alero 2000-02 Pontiac Sunfire 2001-02 Pontiac Grand Am with Manual Transmission (RPO M86 or M94)

There is now an aftermarket source for limited slip differentials, of the helical-gear, torque-sensing / torque-biasing design.

It also has a following in the ecotec racing community for being able to handle 700 hp with an LSD insert and only costing about $200. It does not have the problems that plague the F-35 found in the SS, so it makes for a good transmission swap candidate.

== Gear ratios ==
=== M86/M94 ===
Regular Production Option (RPO) code M86 and M94 is rated for lighter vehicles with a maximum gross vehicle weight rating (GVWR) of 1,857 kilograms (4,094 lb).

Applications

Final Drive	1	2	3	4	5	R
3.94	3.58	2.02	1.35	0.98	0.69	3.31

- 2000–2005 Chevrolet Cavalier
- 2000–2005 Pontiac Sunfire
- 2000–2005 Pontiac Grand Am
- 2000-2002 Oldsmobile Alero

Final Drive	1	2	3	4	5	R
3.84	3.58	2.02	1.35	0.98	0.69	3.31

f23

- 2005–2008 Chevrolet Cobalt
- 2009–2010 Chevrolet Cobalt (economy package 3.63:1 FDR is RPO FY1)
- 2005–2007 Pontiac G5
- 2003–2007 Saturn Ion
- Opel Corsa
- Opel Astra
- 2000–2002 Opel Vectra B
- Opel Combo
- Opel Zafira
- Opel Tigra
- Opel Speedster
- Saturn L-series

Final Drive	1	2	3	4	5	R
4.17	3.58	2.02	1.35	0.98	0.69	3.31

f23

- 2005–2008 Chevrolet HHR
- 2009–2010 Chevrolet HHR is 3.95:1 FDRr.

=== MG3 ===
RPO code MG3 is rated for heavier vehicles with a maximum GVWR of 2,030 kilograms (4,475 lb).

Applications

Final Drive	1	2	3	4	5	R
4.41	3.58	2.02	1.35	0.98	0.81	3.31

- 2002–2007 Saturn Vue

== Mechanical Faults ==
=== Rattling / Grinding ===
On 28 January 2002, General Motors released a Technical Service Bulletin (TSB #02-07-29-001) addressing a "Grinding/Rattle Type Noise Coming From Transmission". The TSB was intended for the following GM vehicles equipped with the GM Quad 4 engine (RPO LD9) and Getrag M86/M94 5-Speed Transmissions:

- 2000–2002 Chevrolet Cavalier
- 2000–2001 Oldsmobile Alero
- 2000–2002 Pontiac Sunfire
- 2000–2001 Pontiac Grand Am

The bulletin continued to explain that there are actually two distinguishable noises which have two very different remedies.

There are two separate noises. Follow the diagnostic procedures listed below to determine which noise the vehicle has and perform the outlined repair.

- Noise 1: This is a very distinct noise that is usually much louder than the second noise that can be associated with this transmission. If the vehicle is not making any noise when trying to verify the condition, it can be induced by making several tight left hand circles with the vehicle at normal operating temperature.

Making a sharp right hand turn will usually stop the noise. While the noise is occurring, in order to distinguish between the two noises, you can press lightly on the clutch pedal without releasing the clutch and the noise will NOT go away or change. As a second diagnostic aid, while the vehicle is making the noise, shift to third gear and the noise will stop.

- Noise 2: This noise, commonly referred to as gear rattle, can be induced by lugging the engine in any gear, but is usually most noticeable in first or second gear. While the noise is occurring, if you press lightly on the clutch pedal without releasing the clutch, the noise will be reduced or eliminated.

General Motors provided a fix for "Noise #1" but stated that "Noise #2" was a characteristic of any car equipped with a manual transmission and that a similar noise could be repeated by lugging the engine. The remedy for "Noise #1" was to overfill the transmission with Saturn Manual Transmission Lubricant from the stock 1.8 quarts to 2.6 quarts. Although this seemed to work for many customers, many other complaints still surfaced and in 2003 General Motors released another TSB urging customers that still have the rattling noise in their transmissions should bring their vehicles in to their nearest General Motors affiliated dealer for a more complex fix. This time, GM Technicians had concluded that gears one and two required additional thrust loads and proceeded to install a wave washer between the blocking ring and speed gears for gears three and four. This indeed fixed the rattle issue once and for all, but has more recently been lamented in many online communities as causing a bigger problem than it solves, as many customers that received this fix reported third and fourth gears grinding from time to time while shifting. Afterwards, many owners of these vehicles have concluded that leaving the transmission alone was for the best, as the rattling noise has been proven to be harmless.
