= Windsor Transmission =

Former car parts plant in Windsor, Ontario

Coordinates: 42°18′29.11″N 83°0′3.72″W

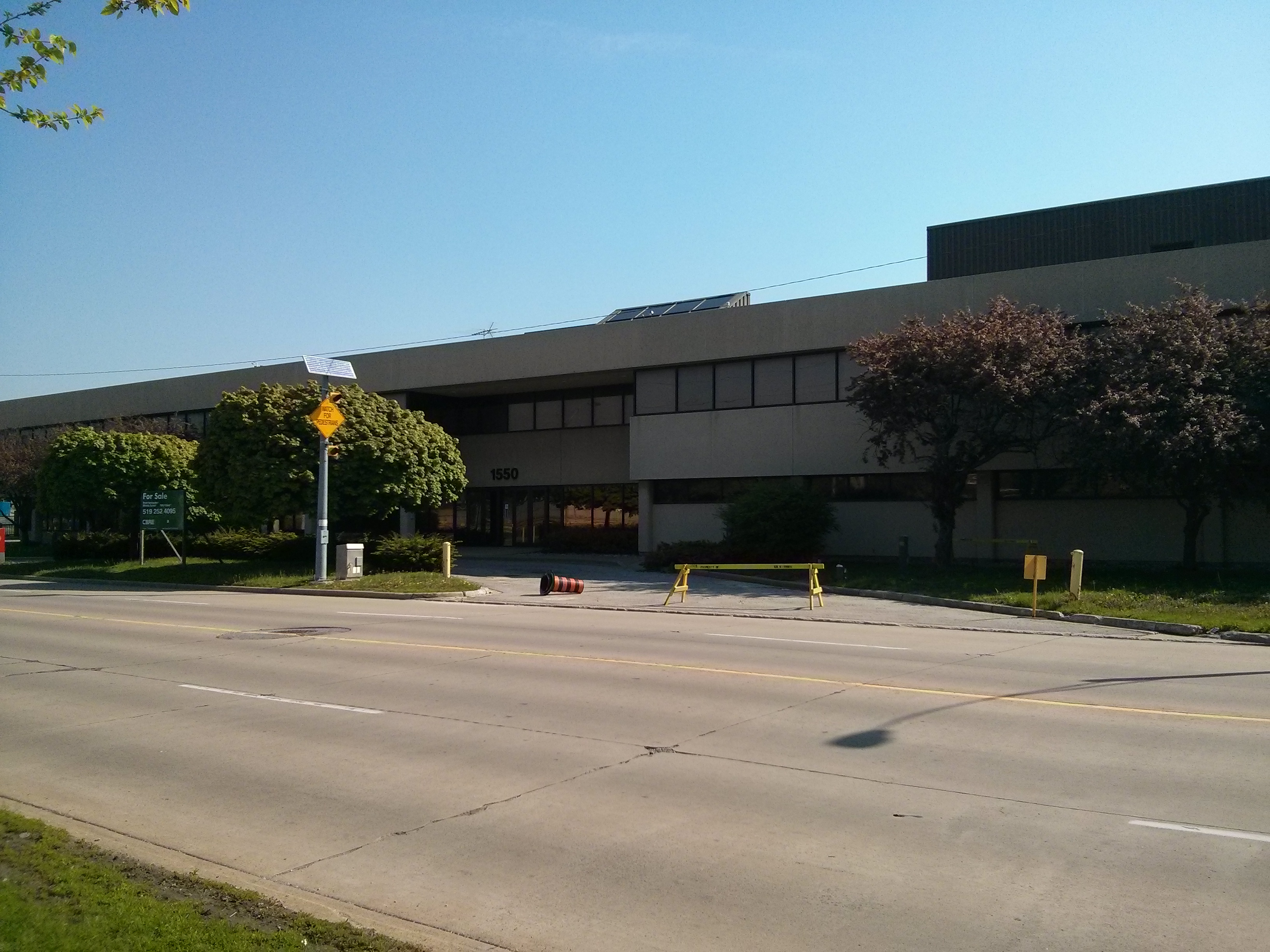
- Windsor Transmission in May 2014
- Interactive map of the Windsor Transmission area

General information
- Status: Demolished
- Type: Automotive factory
- Location: 1555 Kildare Road, Walkerville, Windsor, Ontario, Canada N8W 2W2
- Closed: July 28, 2010
- Demolished: 2017
- Owner: MotiPark Ltd.

Windsor Transmission was a General Motors of Canada parts plant in Windsor, Ontario and one of several facilities in southern Ontario and Canada. It was the only plant located in southwestern Ontario and was located closer to GM headquarters in Detroit than GM Canada headquarters in Oshawa.

It made front-wheel-drive, automatic transmissions and transmission components used by other GM facilities.

Built in 1963, the facility closed on July 28, 2010 and will not be re-tooled. This resulted in the layoff of 1,400 workers at the plant. Products produced at this plant have been discontinued, with production of new six-speed transmissions moving to the St. Catharines Engine Plant in St. Catharines, Ontario.

== Products ==
- 4T40/4T45 automatic transaxles for Chevrolet Malibu and Cobalt, Pontiac G5 and G6, and Saturn Vue and Aura
