= Pontiac G6 =

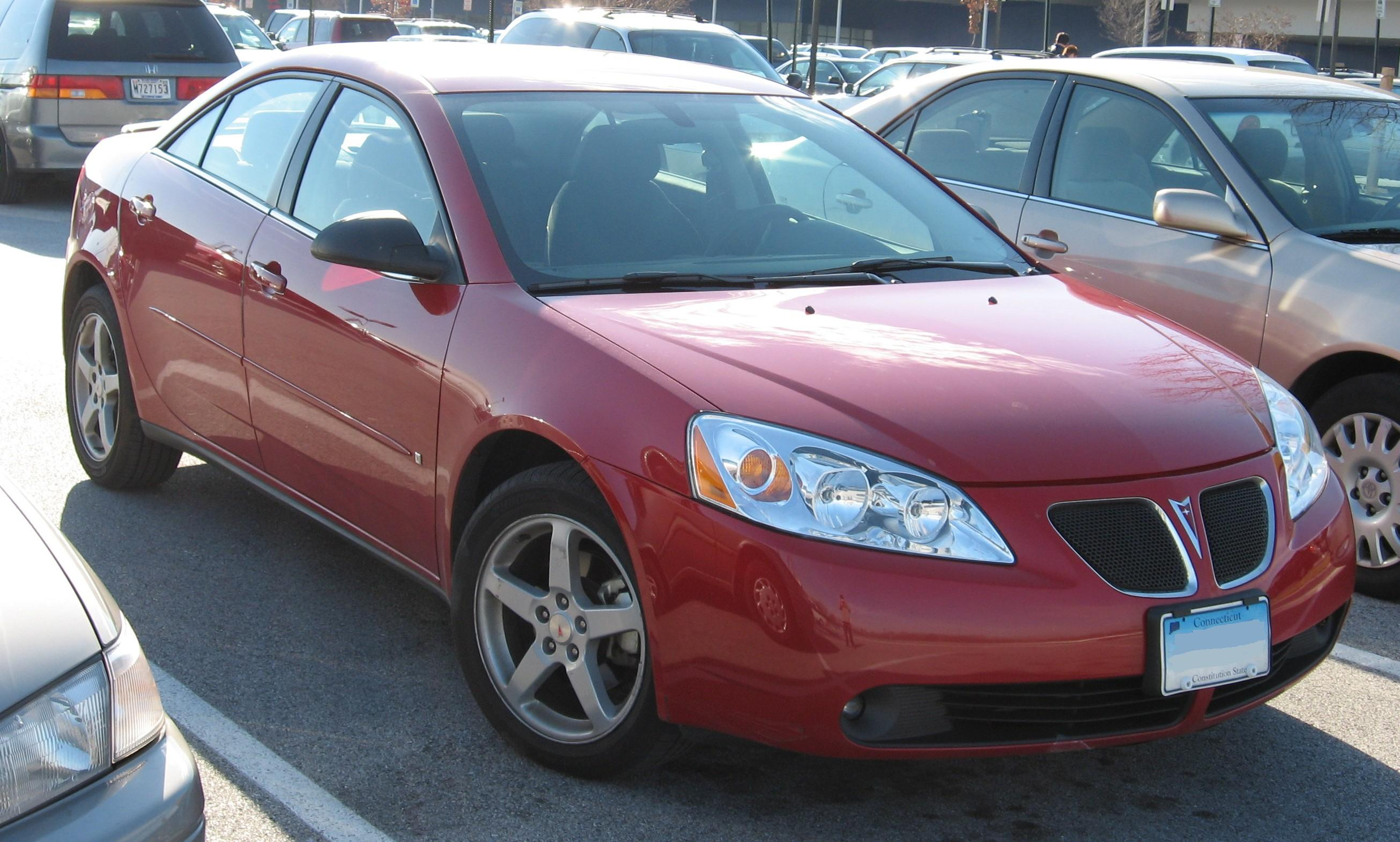

Overview
- Manufacturer: Pontiac (General Motors)
- Production: 2004–2010
- Model years: 2005–2010
- Assembly: United States: Lake Orion, Michigan (Orion Assembly)
- Designer: Jelani Aliyu

Body and chassis
- Class: Mid-size car
- Body style: 2-door convertible 2-door coupe 4-door sedan
- Layout: Transverse front-engine, front-wheel drive
- Platform: GM Epsilon platform/GMX381
- Related: Fiat Croma; Cadillac BLS; Chevrolet Malibu; Opel Signum; Opel Vectra; Saab 9-3; Saturn Aura

Powertrain
- Engine: Gasoline: 2.4 L LE5 I4; 3.5 L LX9 V6; 3.5 L LZ4 V6; 3.6 L LY7 V6; 3.9 L LZ9 V6; Gasoline/E85: 2.4 L LE9 I4; 3.5 L LZE V6
- Transmission: 4-speed 4T45 automatic; 6-speed 6T40 automatic; 6-speed 6T70 automatic; 6-speed F40 manual

Dimensions
- Wheelbase: 112.3 in (2,852 mm)
- Length: Sedan: 189.0 in (4,801 mm); Coupe/Convertible: 189.1 in (4,803 mm)
- Width: Sedan/Convertible: 70.6 in (1,793 mm); Coupe: 70.4 in (1,788 mm)
- Height: Sedan: 57.1 in (1,450 mm); Coupe: 56.4 in (1,433 mm); Convertible: 56.7 in (1,440 mm)
- Curb weight: Sedan: 3,305 lb (1,499 kg); Coupe: 3,426 lb (1,554 kg); Convertible: 3,855 lb (1,749 kg)

Chronology
- Predecessor: Pontiac Grand Am

The Pontiac G6 is a mid-size car that was produced by General Motors under the Pontiac brand. It was introduced in 2004 for the 2005 model year to replace the Grand Am.

The G6 shared the GM Epsilon platform with the Chevrolet Malibu, Saab 9-3, and other General Motors vehicles. Features included a remote starting system (standard on GT, optional on base model), traction control/ABS, electronic stability control, automatic headlights, as well as a panoramic sunroof option. A retractable hardtop convertible was offered for model years 2006-2009. Production ended in 2010 with the discontinuation of the Pontiac line. The final Pontiac branded vehicle was a white G6.

With the G6, Pontiac introduced a two-digit naming convention, with the Pontiac G8 a class above the G6 and the Pontiac G5 a class below. In the case of the G6, the nameplate designated it as the sixth generation of its predecessor, the Pontiac Grand Am.

== Overview ==
The Pontiac G6 was first introduced at the 2003 North American International Auto Show as a concept car. The concept used a 3.5 L supercharged V6 that made 285 horsepower and 272 lb ft of torque mated to a 4T65-E electronically controlled automatic transmission. When the G6 was introduced as a 2005 model year, it had two trim levels, base "V6" and sportier "GT". Both trims, however, used a 3.5 L pushrod V6 producing 200 horsepower (150 kW) and 220 lb_{f}·ft (300 N·m) of torque. Matched to a four-speed automatic transmission, the GT featured TAPshift, where the driver could select the gears manually.

Base models were well equipped, featuring power locks, windows and mirrors with keyless entry, six-speaker CD stereo, power driver's seat, air conditioning, and split folding rear seat. GTs added an eight-speaker Monsoon stereo, premium cloth seats with six-way adjustment, remote start, ABS, and traction control.

In 2006, the G6 added two new trim levels and two new bodystyles, a coupe, and a retractable hard top convertible. The new trim levels were a new base four-cylinder trim (sometimes referred to as "SE"), and the high performance "GTP". Coupes and convertibles were available in GT and GTP trims only. The new base model used a 169-horsepower, 2.4 L DOHC inline-4, mated to a four-speed automatic transmission. The 3.5 L V6 was now part of a sport-package on the base/SE, and remained standard on the GT. The new GTP used a 3.9 L version of the GT's 3.5 L V6, but also utilizes variable valve timing (VVT), increasing output to 240 horsepower. A four-speed automatic transmission was standard, but for no cost, a six-speed manual transmission was available. The GTP convertible was not available with the manual transmission and reduced its power to 227 hp, due to a more restrictive exhaust system. The GTP also featured standard electronic stability control.

The 2007 G6 saw more engine changes, and standard side torso and side curtain airbags (actually introduced late in the 2006 model year) were new. The GT now featured VVT on its 3.5 L V6, raising power from 200 hp to 224 hp. The 3.9 L V6 became an option on the GT, producing 227 horsepower in automatic transmission form and 240 horsepower in manual transmission form. The GTP was given a new 3.6 L DOHC V6 with 24 valves and VVT, producing 252 horsepower at 6300 RPM. It is mated to a six-speed automatic transmission. Midway through the model year, the six-speed manual was dropped with the 3.9 L, along with its 240-horsepower output. The GTP convertible was also discontinued. For 2008, the GTP became the GXP with more dramatic styling cues, and the 3.9 L engine became an exclusive convertible option, with horsepower down to 222. SAE ratings also dropped the horsepower ratings on the 2.4 L and 3.5 L models to 164 hp and 219 hp (217 hp on convertibles), respectively.

For 2009, 2.4 L four-cylinder engines were added to the coupe lineup. An all new 6 speed automatic transmission, which debuted on the Chevrolet Malibu, became optional on 4 cylinder models. GM revised the G6 in the middle of 2009, creating a "2009.5" model year. Changes consisted of a revised front and rear fascia as well as a revision of the dashboard, most notably adding an updated radio with Bluetooth capability. Coupes and convertibles ceased production at the end of the 2009 model year, making examples with the 2009.5 changes fairly rare. Subsequent to this model's introduction, General Motors entered bankruptcy, and announced that the G6 sedan would be discontinued in 2010. Most other Pontiac models had been discontinued, but the G6 was in high-demand for fleet vehicle orders, facilitating production to continue while the brand was wound down. In 2010, the G6 had white back-lit dashboard lights instead of the traditional red Pontiac color scheme.

GM began marketing the Buick brand in Mexico after the 2009 model year, to replace Pontiac. Accordingly, the Pontiac G6 was effectively replaced by the Buick Regal in Mexico. Ultimately, the G6 (as well as the Saturn Aura) were replaced by GM's revived Buick Regal nameplate in the United States and Canada.

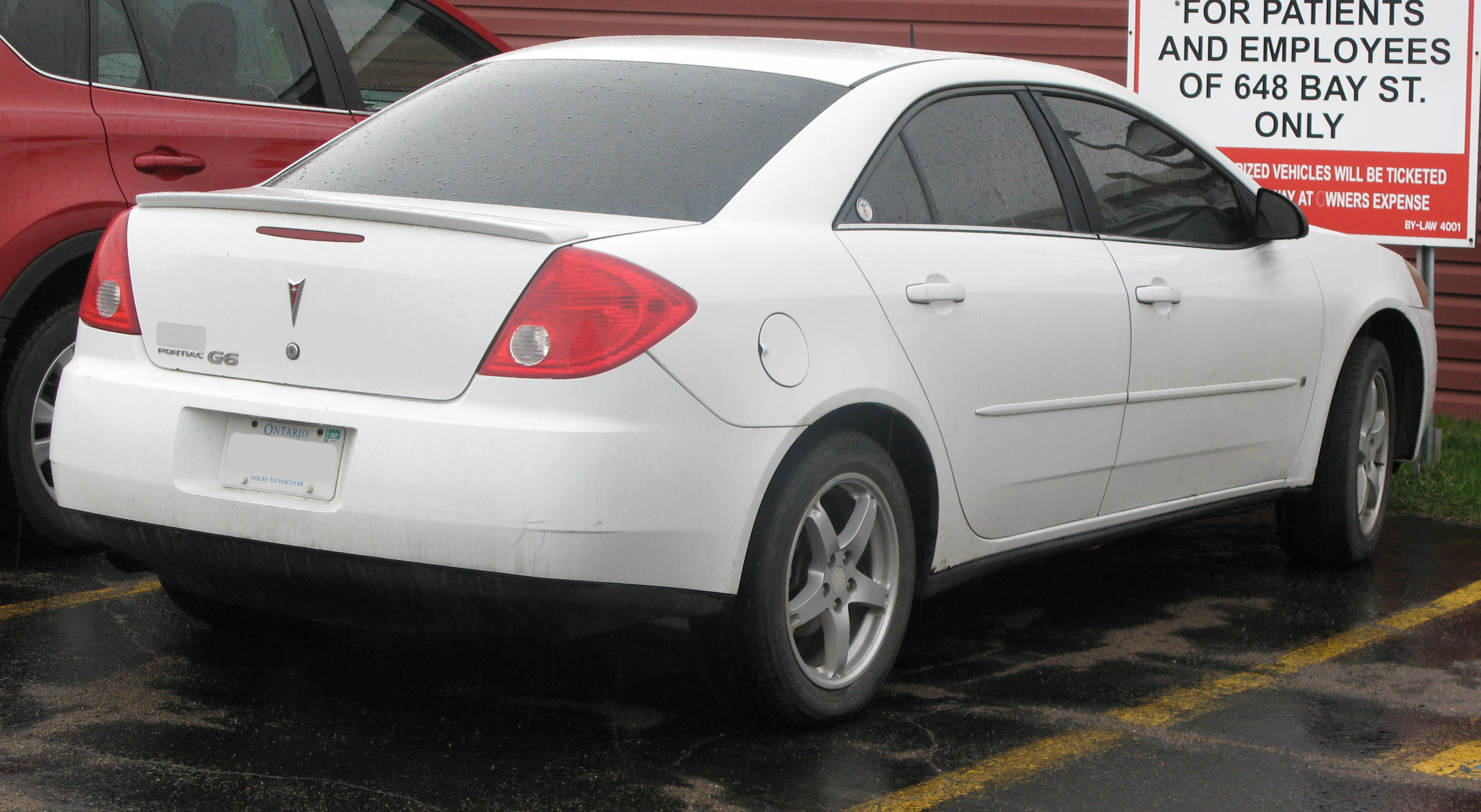
Pontiac G6 sedan (rear view; 2009)

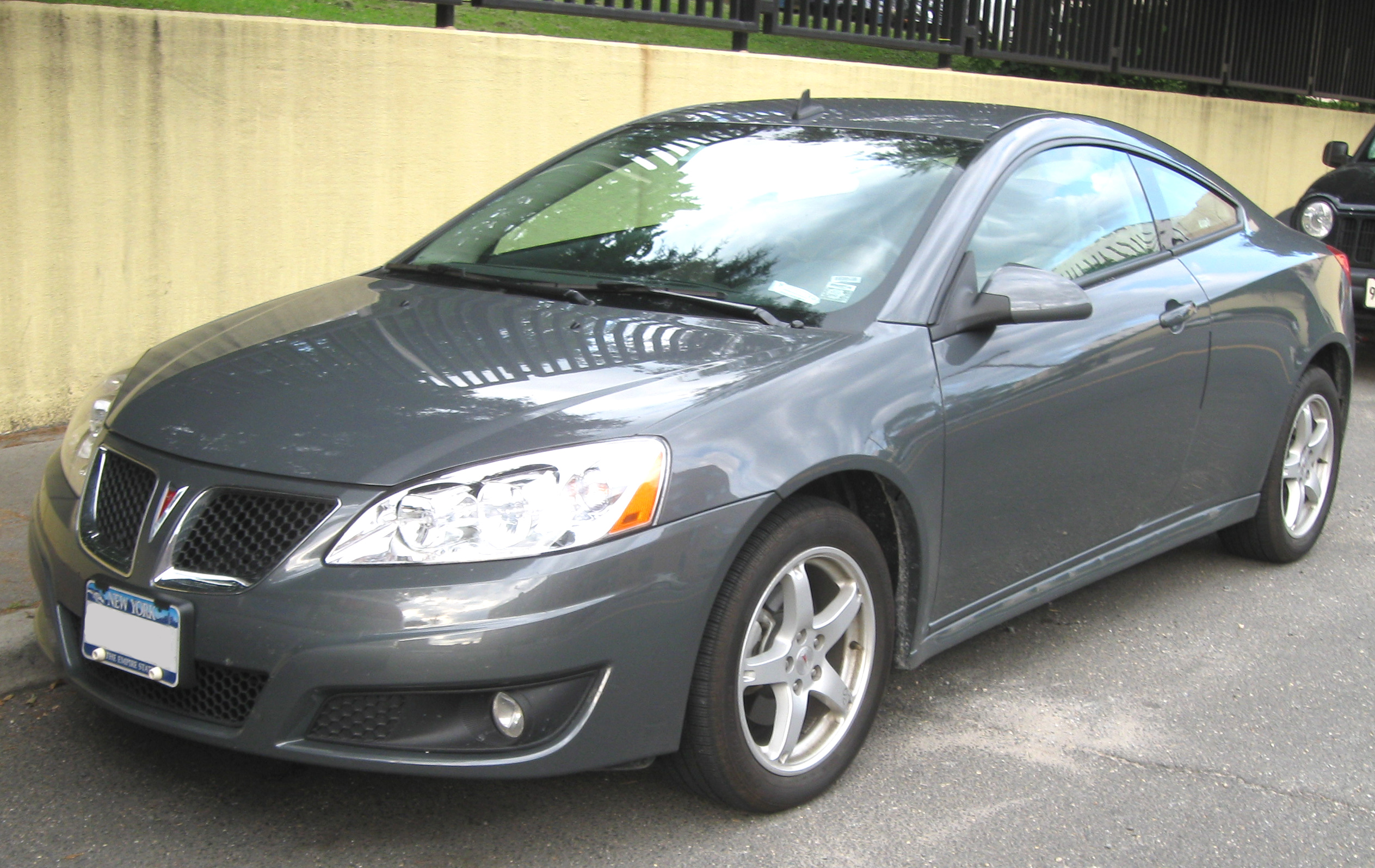
Pontiac G6 coupe (2009.5 facelift model)

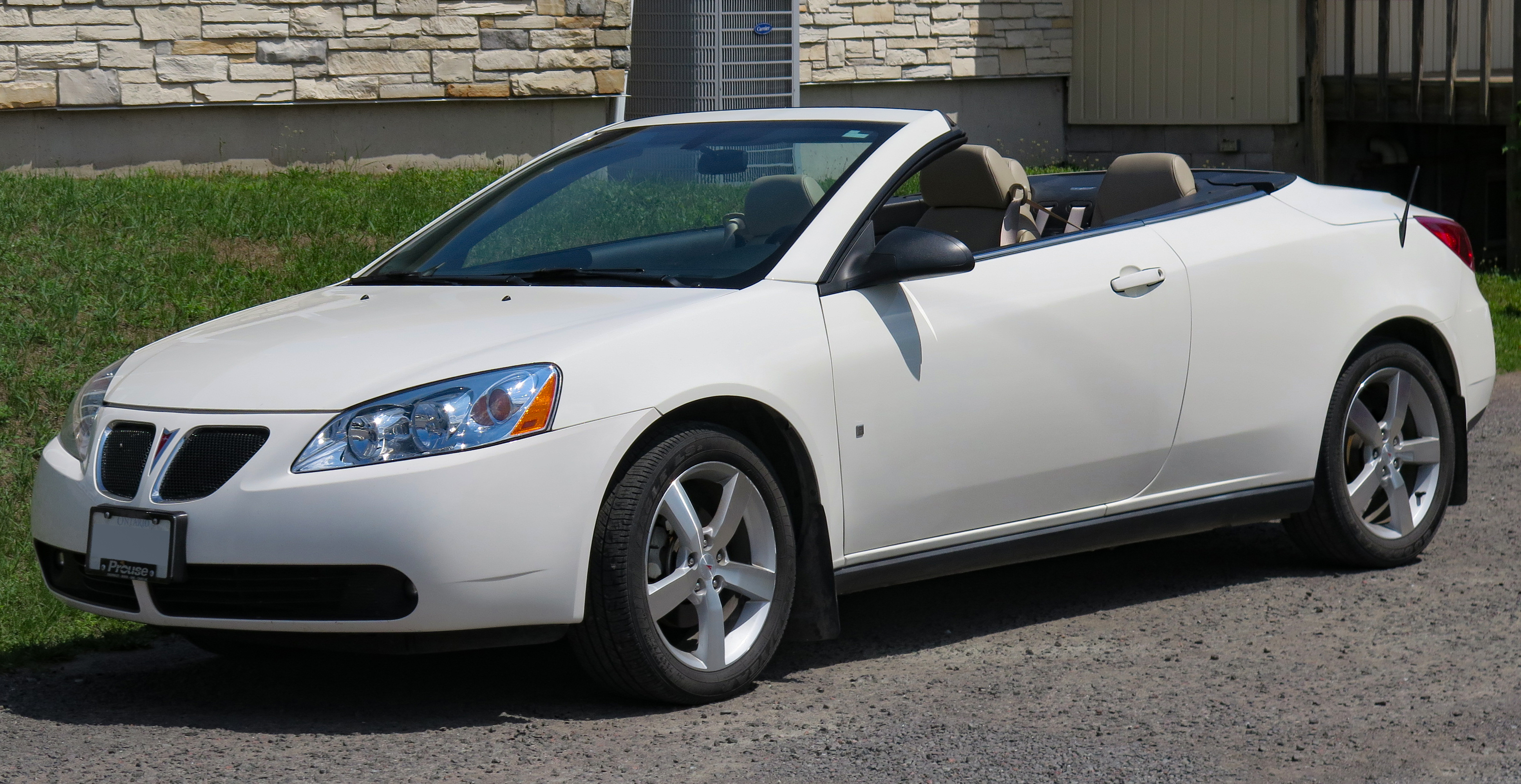
Pontiac G6 convertible

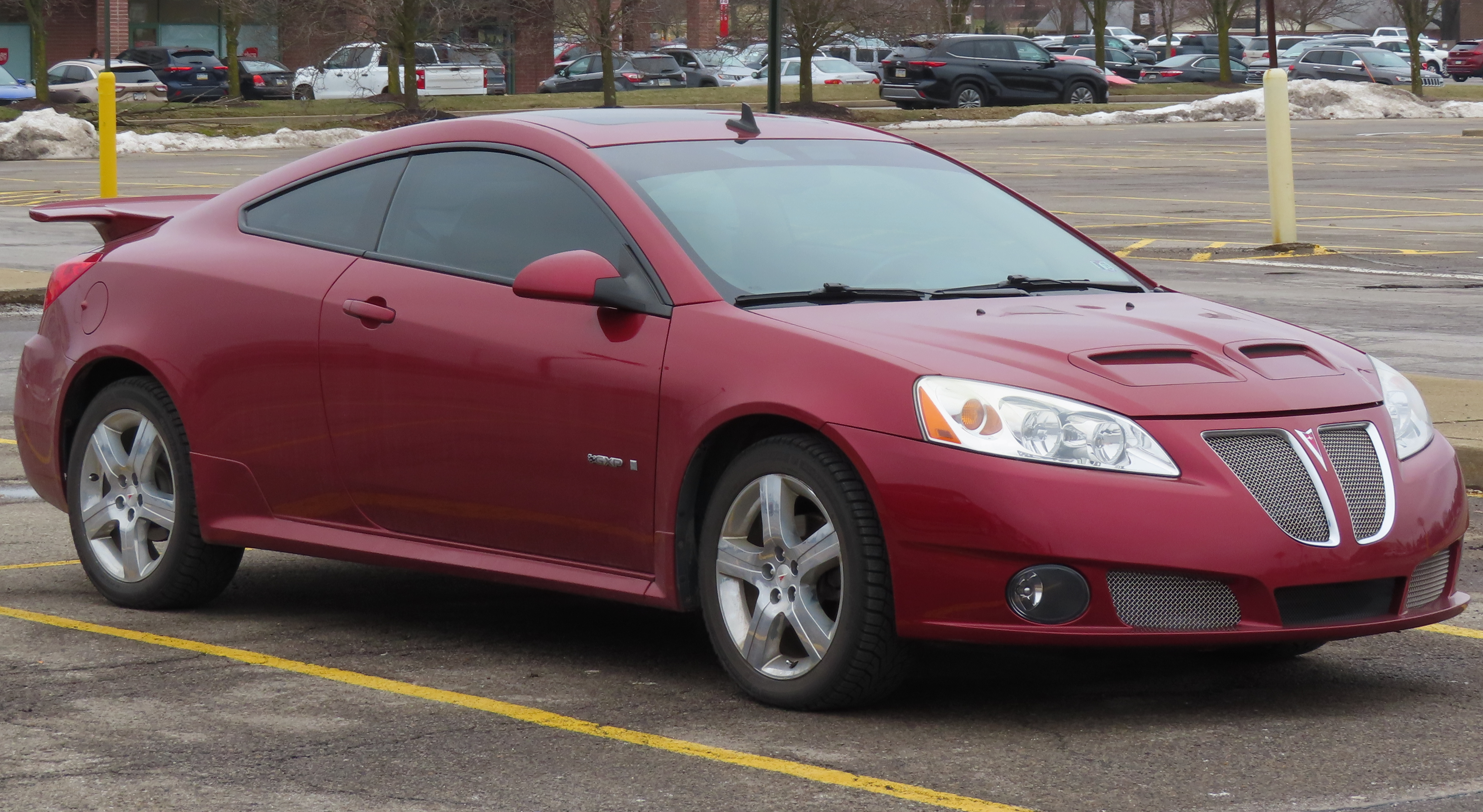
2008 Pontiac G6 GXP coupe

== Retractable Hardtop Convertible ==
Introduced in 2006, the G6's power-operated hydraulic retractable hardtop was engineered by the Pontiac, Michigan offices of Karmann Technical Development, L.L.C. It was manufactured as a roof module by Karmann and delivered in-sequence to General Motors’ Orion Assembly center.

Originally, development of the roof system was to be a joint venture with Karmann and ASC Inc., with Karmann later assuming the complete project. Subsequently, during Karmann's initial development, prototypes failed durability testing, delaying the convertible's launch, and threatening to scuttle the program if GM could not amortize the convertible's cost before the G6 was projected for redesign. The top needed to survive 16,000-20,000 cycles, but initially failed after fewer than 10,000. As well, prototypes had poor fit between the deck lid and rear fenders.

In production, the two-piece metal top featured insulation to provide internal sound and interior thermal levels commensurate with its coupe counterpart. Integrated into a structural member wrapping behind the rear seats, the top module was affixed to the car's structure with six bolts. The final structure achieved a stiffness measure of 25 hertz, comparable to industry competitors. A four-bar linkage system provided the rigidity and lateral stability necessary to cantilever retractable top components in various parked conditions, i.e., when parked on uneven surfaces. Top operation used seven hydraulic cylinders that activated and latched/unlatched the folding top, powered by one hydraulic pump.

General Motors reported that in production form, each top module successfully tested for 12,000 cycles, about twice the cycles the typical convertible endures in its lifetime. The convertible was tested under a variety of weather conditions, from arid desert to arctic conditions, and was extensively water and environmental tested. In a 2006 road test, Autoweek noted considerable cowl shake, as well as squeak-and-rattle issues.

After the transmission's Park function was engaged and the trunk's cargo panel deployed, top retraction took 30 seconds, with the two-piece top stacking in the trunk and the trunk lid, doubling as a tonneau cover. Cargo area with the top up was 5.8 cubic feet, and with the top down, 1.8 cubic feet (4.5 cubic feet with spare tire removed). GM said the G6 convertible had 34" of rear-seat legroom.

Ward's Automotive reported in 2008, that Karmann provided a revised, more robust retractable top, improving the panel-to-panel latch on the 2-piece clamshell lid, to eliminate squeaks and rattles. With its quality issues, a late launch due to development problems, and slow sales, the G6 convertible was discontinued after model year 2009 and replaced by the Opel Cascada, marketed as a Buick in the U.S. in early 2016.

== Safety ==
The Insurance Institute for Highway Safety gave the Pontiac G6 an overall Good score in the frontal offset crash test, but an Acceptable score in the side impact crash test even though side airbags were introduced late in the 2006 model year. The lower side impact score was due in part to a marginal rating for the structure/safety cage category.

== 2005 GXP concept ==
The 2005 GXP concept was built by General Motors Performance Division. It includes a 3.6 L HO VVTI V6 engine rated at 275 hp (205 kW), F40 six-speed manual transmission, performance intake, GM Performance cat-back exhaust with bright tips, and 19-inch wheels with Bridgestone Potenza RE040 255 series tires. It was unveiled at the 2004 SEMA Show, and was later sold on the eBay Motors website. The auction ended on May 3, 2009 with winning bid price of US$16500.00.

== Marketing ==
Complementing a US$110 million publicity campaign, in a launch publicity stunt, The Oprah Winfrey Show gave 276 G6s to audience members at the fall 2004 season premiere.

On September 12, 2014, Autoblog followed up with the G6 winners on the tenth anniversary of the telecast. The winners interviewed learned that although they did "get a car" from Winfrey during the broadcast, in actuality they had to go to the Pontiac dealership in their area to pick up the G6 because the vehicles that were shown in the studio's parking lot were used as a promotion. One couple had to sell their G6s because they learned of tax implications that came with owning the car. Another kept hers even though her two friends who came with her to the taping no longer have theirs (one was sold, another was totaled in an accident) and hopes to give the G6 to her daughter in time for college, saying "I'm hoping to drive it until we can't drive it any more."

== Motorsports ==
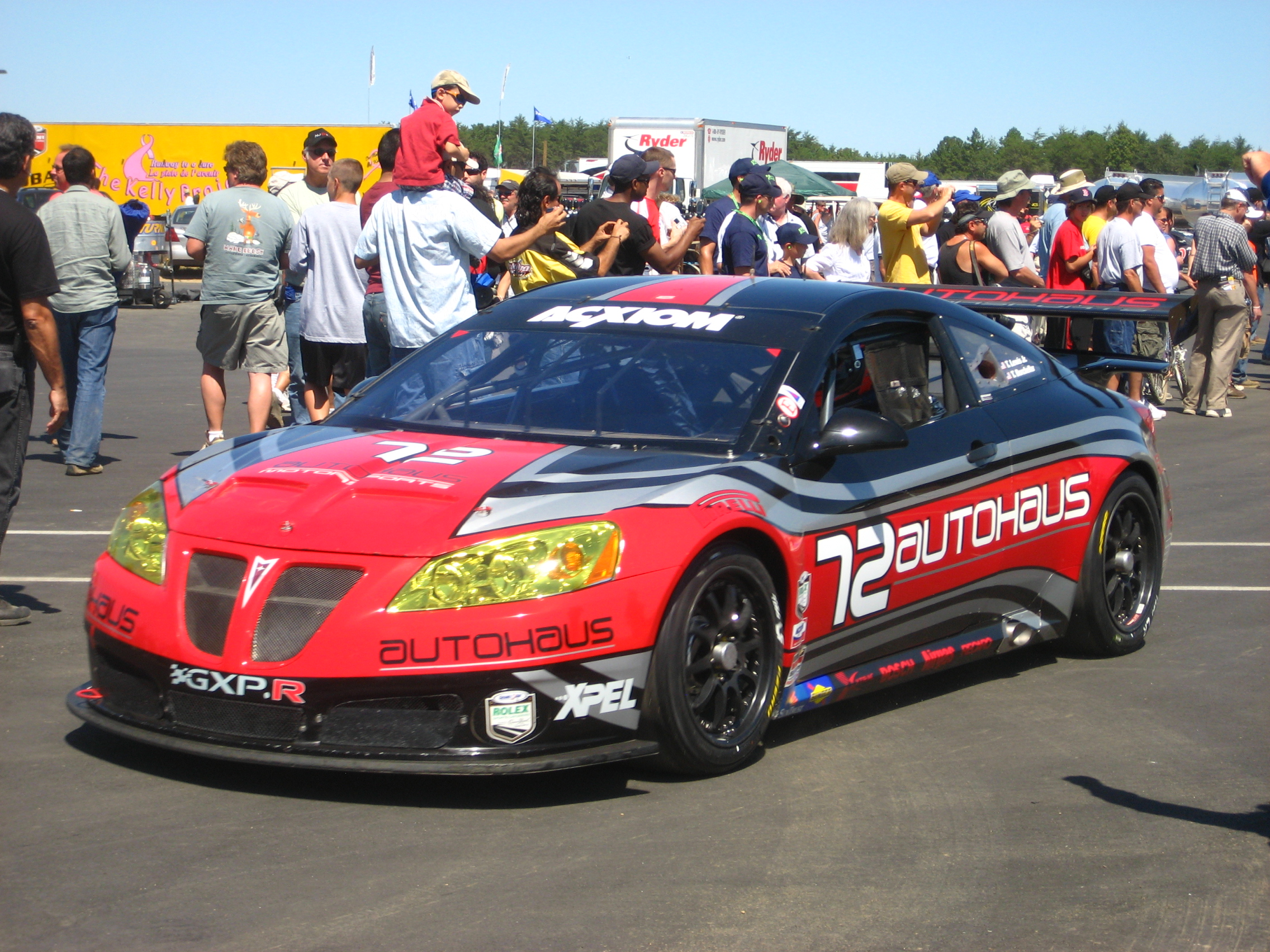
Autohaus Motorsport's GXP.R used in the Rolex Sports Car Series

The G6 was used in the GT class of Rolex Sports Car Series as a replacement for the Pontiac GTO.R after the GTO went out of production. The cars are referred to as GXP.Rs and built by GM's endorsed chassis constructor, Pratt & Miller.

It is powered by the LS2 V8 engine that produces approximately 450 horsepower (340 kW). Weight saving features include carbon fiber body panels and shatter-resistant polycarbonate windows. The custom tube-frame chassis is not related to the road car's chassis and the 6-speed gearbox delivers power to the rear wheels. The front and rear fenders flared to cover the wide, 18-inch wheels and class-spec Hoosier racing tires. A rear wing reminiscent of sports option package on the race car is fitted at the back, underneath the proper racing rear wing.

The G6 GXP also raced in the NHRA Powerade Drag Racing Series Pro Stock class for Warren Johnson Racing.

== Yearly United States sales ==
| Calendar Year | Total American sales |
|---|---|
| 2004 | 16,185 |
| 2005 | 124,844 |
| 2006 | 157,644 |
| 2007 | 150,001 |
| 2008 | 140,240 |
| 2009 | 87,171 |
| 2010 | 479 |
| Total | 676,564 |

== Recalls ==
There have been four NHTSA formal recalls for the Pontiac G6.

The first recall (NHTSA Campaign 06V417000) was for Pontiac G6 cars with aftermarket seat upgrades. To expedite sales at some dealerships, GM authorized seats to be replaced with leather seats as a dealer-installed option. This change could cause the passenger air bag sensor to not detect an occupant. GM took the rare step of buying back any cars that had this dealer installed option.

The second recall (NHTSA Campaign 09V036000) affected 8,012 MY 2005-2006 G6 vehicles, and corrected a potential corrosion that affected brake light wiring, and could cause brake lights to not illuminate.

On September 21, 2012, General Motors recalled 473,841 vehicles involving the Chevy Malibu, Pontiac G6, and Saturn Aura from model years 2007 through 2010 equipped with four-speed automatic transmissions. The problem is a condition that could make cars roll when in park. The recall affects 426,240 in the United States, 40,029 in Canada, and 7,572 in other markets.

This recall is an expansion of a much smaller 2011 recall on certain 2009/2009.5 MY vehicles which experienced the same condition. GM expanded the recall in 2012 after finding the problem was not isolated to that model year.

In 2014, GM recalled the vehicle regarding a condition in which the transmission shift cable may fracture. The fracture prevents the driver from selecting gears and may cause the vehicle to move in an unintended direction.
