= Saturn Aura =

Midsize sedan manufactured by Saturn

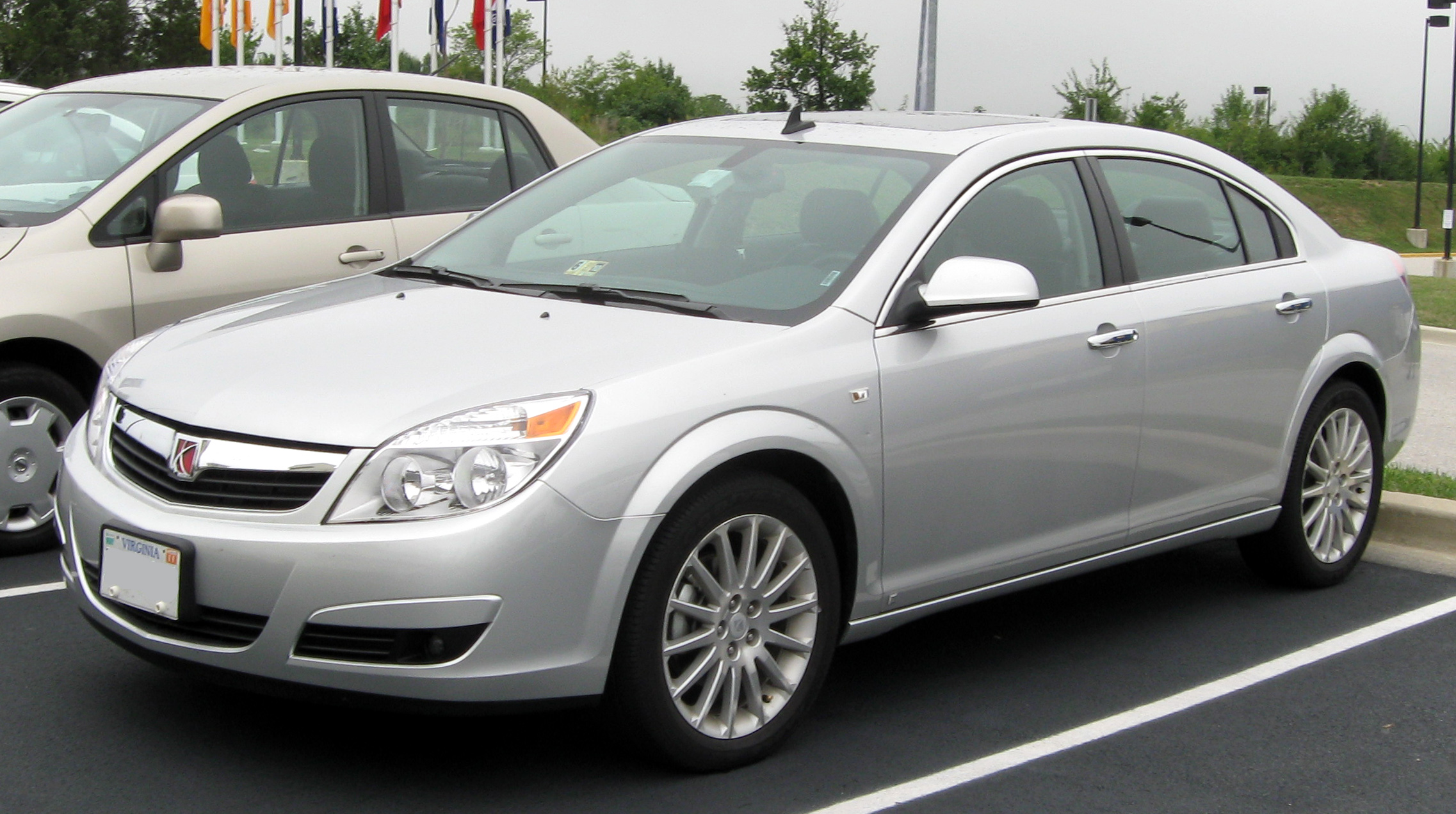
- Saturn Aura XR

Overview
- Manufacturer: Saturn (General Motors)
- Production: 2006–2009
- Model years: 2007–2009
- Assembly: United States: Kansas City, Kansas (Fairfax Assembly)
- Designer: Bryan Nesbitt

Body and chassis
- Class: Mid-size car
- Body style: 4-door sedan
- Layout: Transverse front-engine, front-wheel drive
- Platform: GM Epsilon platform/GMX384
- Related: Chevrolet Malibu; Fiat Croma; Opel Signum; Opel Vectra C Pontiac G6; Saab 9-3

Powertrain
- Engine: Gasoline: 2.4 L LE5 I4; 3.5 L LZ4 V6; 3.6 L LY7 V6; Gasoline/E85: 2.4 L LE9 I4; BAS Hybrid: 2.4 L LAT I4
- Electric motor: ISG Motor
- Transmission: 4-speed 4T45-E automatic; 6-speed 6T70 automatic; 6-speed 6T40 automatic
- Hybrid drivetrain: BAHVs (Aura Green Line)

Dimensions
- Wheelbase: 112.3 in (2,852 mm)
- Length: 190.9 in (4,849 mm)
- Width: 70.3 in (1,786 mm)
- Height: 57.6 in (1,463 mm)
- Curb weight: 3,781 lb (1,715 kg)

Chronology
- Predecessor: Saturn L-Series
- Successor: Buick Regal (fifth generation)

The Saturn Aura is a four-door, five-passenger front engine/front-wheel drive mid-sized sedan manufactured and marketed by GM's Saturn subsidiary over a single generation from 2006 to 2009. The car launched one year before the seventh generation Chevrolet Malibu, its most closely related platform companion.

== History ==
The Aura debuted as a concept car at the North American International Auto Show in January 2005, followed by the production model which debuted at the 2006 New York Auto Show. As the largest sedan in the Saturn range, production commencing in North America in the summer of 2006 for the 2007 model year. The Aura superseded the Saturn L-Series, which was discontinued after the 2005 model year.

Although Saturn had not originally intended to use the Aura name for the production vehicle, the concept vehicle proved popular and the name was retained.

The Aura was part of a product rejuvenation for Saturn, intended to make the brand profitable and competitive with European imports. Reaction to the Aura was positive, both in terms of reviews and sales. The Saturn Aura was the 2007 North American Car of the Year.

The concept used a 252 hp (188 kW) 3.6 L V6 and a new 6T70 six-speed automatic transmission. That powertrain was offered in the production model known as the XR. Also introduced was the 3.5 L V6 with 219 hp (163 kW), down from 224 in 2007 in the XE, and the hybrid 164 hp (122 kW) 2.4 L inline-four, down from 170 hp (127 kW), in the Green Line. The Aura, developed on the GM Epsilon platform, was available only as a sedan and was built at the Kansas City, Kansas, Fairfax Assembly plant.

The Aura was discontinued during the 2009 model year, along with the Saturn division itself, although a second-generation Aura based on the Opel Insignia was due to be released. The Insignia subsequently became the fifth-generation Buick Regal instead. Out of 36,602 Auras built for the final model year, only 3,707 were built in calendar year 2009.

== Design ==
=== Exterior ===
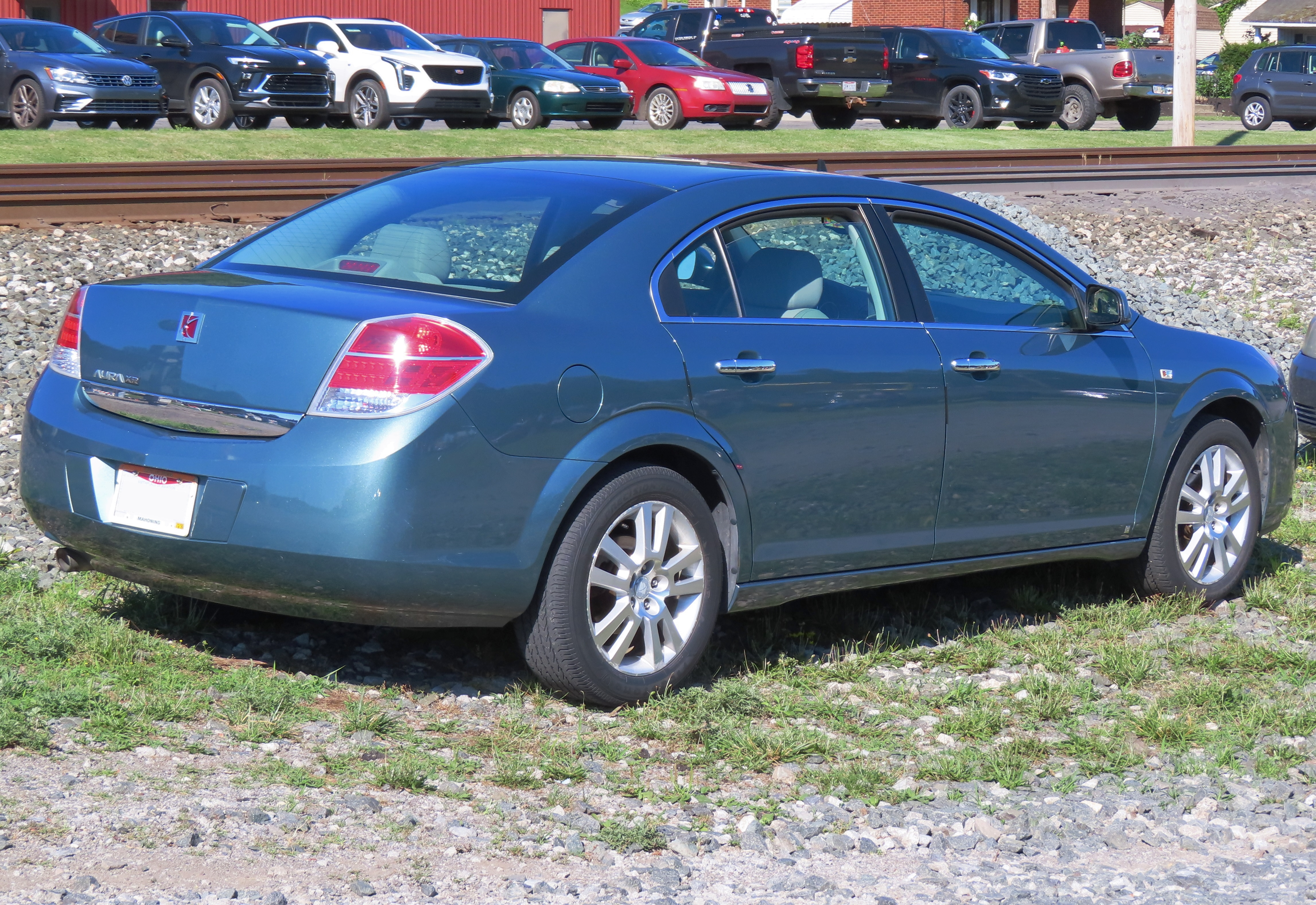
Rear view

All Aura models came standard with folding side mirrors and side marker lights. The design of the Aura Special appearance pieces included an integrated radio antenna in the rear window, a chrome appearance package available on XR models, standard 17 inch wheels with five-spoke wheel covers and P225/50R17 all-season tires on XE models, and standard 18 inch machined aluminum 14-spoke wheels on the XR with high-performance Goodyear Eagle LS2 P225/50R18 T tires.

=== Interior ===
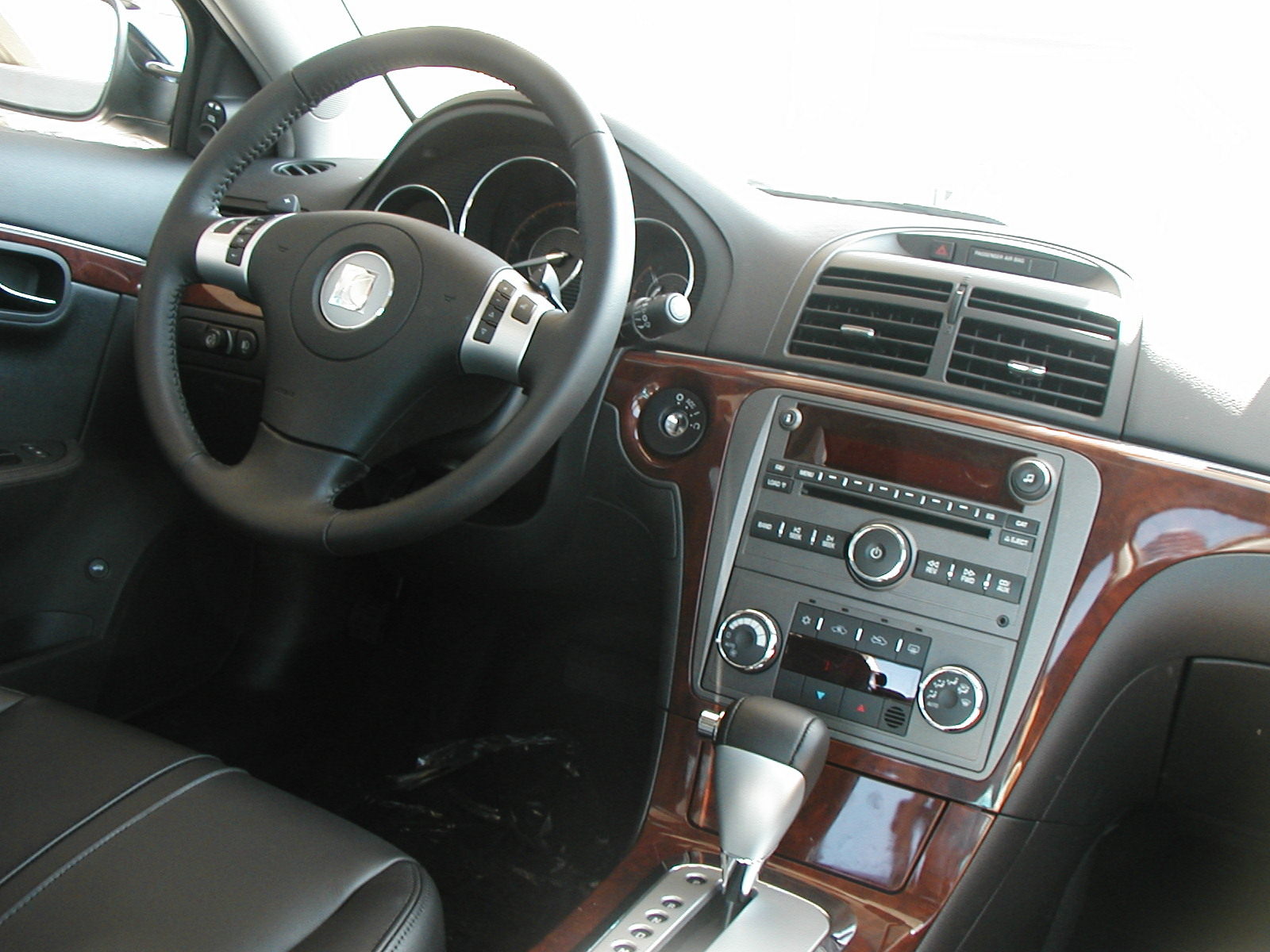
2007 Saturn Aura XR Interior

The interior of the Aura also marked a new interior direction for Saturn, moving to a more European-style interior. The design of the interior of the Aura differed from that of the Ion, which was highly criticized. On the upscale XR model, the interior came with an option for saddle leather and paddle shifters, as well as an option for back seat radio controls. Despite being praised for its design and fit and finish, the Aura's interior was criticized for using cheap materials.

The Aura XR's standard features included automatic climate control, remote vehicle start, Stabilitrak stability control, backseat audio controls, heated seats, six airbags, ABS four-wheel disc brakes, steering wheel audio controls, universal home remote, OnStar and a "Driver Information Center".

== Models ==
=== Aura XR ===
The Aura XR was the top-line Aura model. The XR was fitted with the 3.6 L DOHC V6 with VVT, rated at 252 hp (188 kW) at 6200 rpm and 251 lb⋅ft (340 N⋅m) of torque at 3100 rpm. This engine was first used in the Cadillac CTS as well as the Cadillac STS and marks its third use in a North American GM car. With this 3.6 L engine, the Aura was the first front-wheel drive GM passenger car to use the new Hydra-Matic 6T70 six-speed automatic transmission. The transmission featured TAPshift, which allowed the driver to manually select gears by using paddles located behind the steering wheel. The Aura XR was the performance-oriented version with a taut, but not harsh, suspension and the more powerful engine. Available interior colors in the XR were tan and grey leather (available in the XE), along with the XR-specific black or Morocco Brown leather. Cloth was standard. Other standard features included the Advanced Audio Package, 18 inch alloy wheels, chrome exterior door handles, and remote vehicle start. Given the 2007 Saturn Aura's European roots—the car's chassis was also used for the Saab 9-3. The Aura also used hydraulic power steering (V-6 models only) that provided more feedback and a more linear feel than the fussy electric power-assist units. For 2009, an entry level XR became available. It included the 17 inch 10 spoke alloy wheels available on the XE and the 2.4 L LE5 Ecotec engine mated to GM's all new 6T40 6-speed automatic transmission with TAPshift. The 3.6L VVT with 18" wheels was optional.

=== Aura XE ===
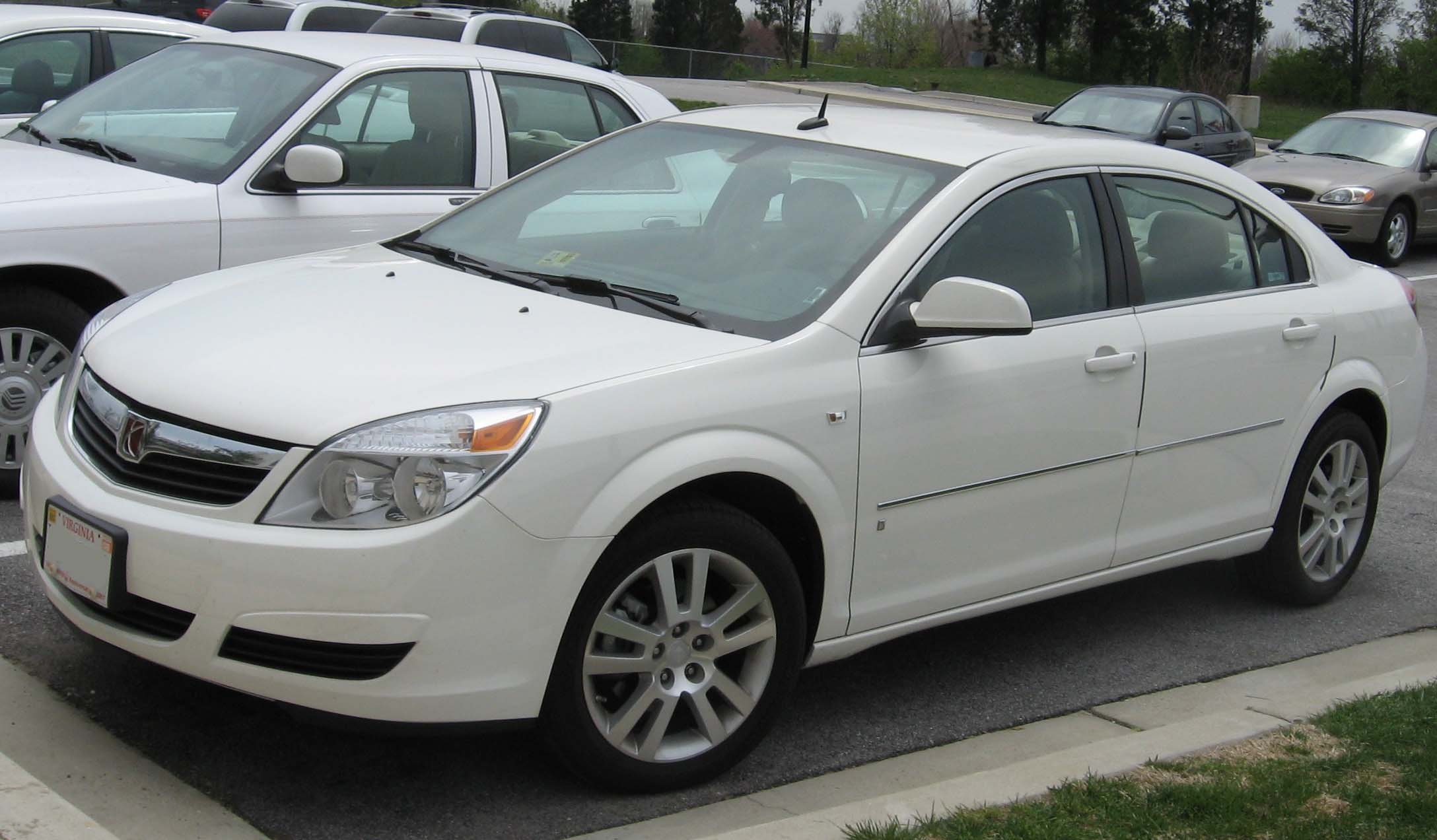
2007 Saturn Aura XE

The base version was the Aura XE. Equipped with the 3.5 L VVT V6 (LZ4), the engine was matched with the 4T45-E four-speed automatic transmission. In the Aura, the engine produced 219 hp (163 kW) and 220 lb⋅ft (300 N⋅m) of torque. Traction Control, six airbags, V6, automatic, auto headlights, CD with AUX, 17 inch wheels, among other features, comes standard. A Special Edition version of the XE included equipment upgrades, the option of the XR-only black or Morocco Brown leather, along with new, XE-only 18 inch machined alloy wheels. Beginning with the 2008 model, the 2.4 L LE5 Ecotec 4-cylinder became available with the 4T45-E 4-speed automatic. For 2009 the standard 4-cylinder was mated to GM's all new 6T40 6-speed automatic with TAPshift as standard equipment. This improved overall performance and increased fuel economy to 22 miles per US gallon (11 L/100 km; 26 mpg_{‑imp}) in the city, and 33 miles per US gallon (7.1 L/100 km; 40 mpg_{‑imp}) on the highway, up from the 2008's 22 miles per US gallon (11 L/100 km; 26 mpg_{‑imp}) city, 30 miles per US gallon (7.8 L/100 km; 36 mpg_{‑imp}) highway.

=== Aura Green Line ===
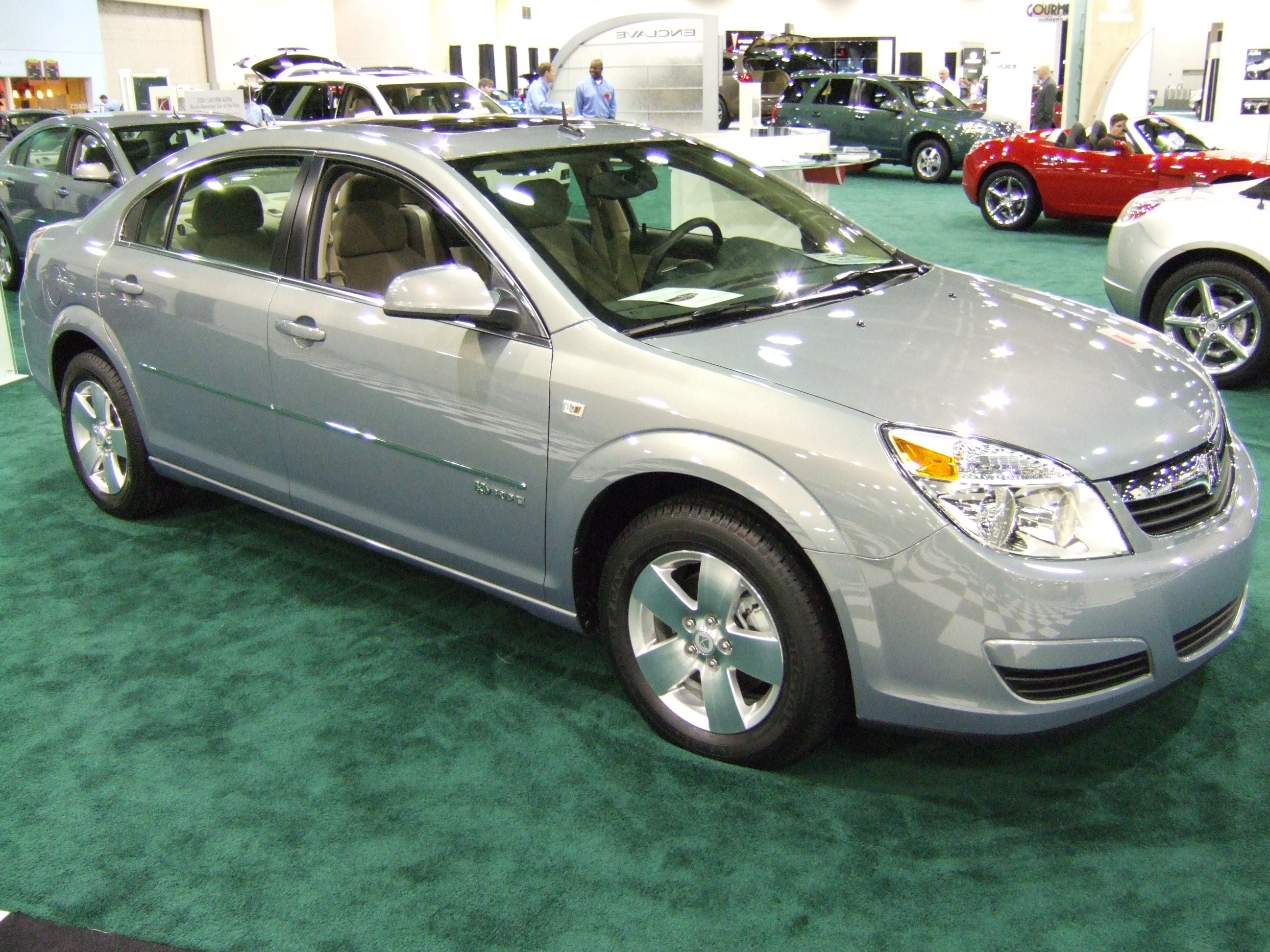
2007 Saturn Aura Green Line

The Aura Green Line was a mild hybrid, following the Vue Green Line as the second vehicle in Saturn's lineup incorporating GM's belt alternator starter system. It rode on the XE's suspension. It was sold from late March 2007 to 2010.

As in the Vue, the Aura Green Line was equipped with the 2.4L Ecotec engine mated to an electric motor/generator and the 4T45-E four-speed automatic transmission. The powertrain was rated at 164 hp (122 kW) and 159 lb⋅ft (216 N⋅m) of torque. The electric motor/generator augmented the gasoline engine during launch and under wide-open throttle. The Aura Green Line had an EPA estimated fuel economy of 26 mpg_{‑US} (9.0 L/100 km; 31 mpg_{‑imp}) city and 34 mpg_{‑US} (6.9 L/100 km; 41 mpg_{‑imp}) highway (for the 2007-08 model years it was 28 mpg_{‑US} (8.4 L/100 km; 34 mpg_{‑imp}) city and 36 mpg_{‑US} (6.5 L/100 km; 43 mpg_{‑imp})), which Saturn claimed was up to a 30% improvement over the Aura XE.

The Saturn Aura Green Line was eligible for a $1300 US Federal tax credit, as well as several state tax credits.

Prior to the shutdown of Saturn, General Motors said that they would introduce a new hybrid system in summer 2010; this was officially cancelled in mid-2009.

=== Recall ===
On September 21, 2012. General Motors recalled 473,841 vehicles involving the Chevy Malibu, Pontiac G6 and Saturn Aura from model years 2007 through 2010 equipped with four-speed automatic transmissions. The problem is a condition that could make cars roll when in park. The recall affects 426,240 in the United States, 40,029 in Canada and 7,572 in other markets.

== Engines ==
Trim	Engine	Displacement	Power	Torque	Transmission	Fuel Mileage (latest EPA mpg_{-US})
Green Line	2.4 L LAT DOHC I4 (BAS hybrid)	2,393 cc (146 cu in)	164 hp (122 kW)	159 lb⋅ft (216 N⋅m)	4-Speed 4T45-E	26 city, 34 hwy, 29 comb
XE (2008)	2.4 L LE5 DOHC I4	2,384 cc (145 cu in)	169 hp (126 kW)	160 lb⋅ft (217 N⋅m)	4-speed 4T45-E	22 city, 30 hwy, 25 comb
XE (2009)	2.4 L LE5 DOHC I4	2,384 cc (145 cu in)	169 hp (126 kW)	160 lb⋅ft (217 N⋅m)	6-speed 6T40	22 city, 33 hwy, 26 comb
XE (2007–08)	3.5 L LZ4 OHV V6	3,510 cc (214 cu in)	219 hp (163 kW)	219 lb⋅ft (297 N⋅m)	4-speed 4T45-E	18 city, 29 hwy, 22 comb
XR (2009)	2.4 L LE5 DOHC I4	2,384 cc (145 cu in)	169 hp (126 kW)	160 lb⋅ft (217 N⋅m)	6-speed 6T40	22 city, 33 hwy, 26 comb
XR (2007–09)	3.6 L LY7 DOHC V6	3,564 cc (217 cu in)	252 hp (188 kW)	251 lb⋅ft (340 N⋅m)	6-speed 6T70	17 city, 26 hwy, 20 comb

== Reception ==
Reception to the Aura was generally positive. The Aura was described as the best looking sedan to come out of GM in quite a while. The Aura was also praised for its performance. The Aura has been described as "the best Saturn yet", and fit and finish and ride quality are regarded as greatly improved over previous Saturns. Other improvements include reduced road noise, attributed to the fact that this model doesn't use polymer body panels like its predecessors, in addition to the extensive soundproofing GM added to car, and the triple-pane front windows and windshield. The Aura also garnered praise for its value, as it was noted that an Aura XE loaded up with certain options cost less at the time than the standard MSRP of the Toyota Camry with a V6. The Aura finished fourth out of six places in a Car and Driver comparison test, ahead of the Chrysler Sebring and the Toyota Camry, but fell behind the Honda Accord. Despite this, it was the best performing out of the cars compared. The Aura also got praise for the craftsmanship of its interior and its European flair. The Aura also got a favorable review by Consumer Guide, with it being a recommended pick. It also got more than favorable reviews from actual owners of the vehicle.

The Aura's interior has been criticized for using cheap materials. Also, the steering wheel has been criticized for being too big for some drivers and that rear headroom was tight when equipped with the optional sunroof. The Aura was also criticized for being noisy over bumps and its lack of a rear armrest and head restraint, and that the push button controls on the steering wheel cannot be operated while holding the wheel. Robert Cumberford of Automobile magazine claimed that the Aura is a good car watered down by GM's cost cutting department.

=== Awards ===
The Aura won the North American Car of the Year prize for 2007. As a result, Saturn sent a copy of the award to select customers who bought an Aura before it was awarded. The Aura also won Canadian's Motoring Television's 2007 car of the year award, Motorweek's Driver's Choice for best new midsize sedan, and World of Wheels' Editor's Choice for best family sedan.

== Yearly American sales ==
Calendar Year	Total American sales
2006	19,746
2007	59,964
2008	59,380
2009	21,395

== See also ==
- List of hybrid vehicles
