= GM 4T40 transmission =

4T40-E/4T45-E

Overview
- Manufacturer: General Motors
- Production: 1995–2010

Body and chassis
- Class: 4-speed transverse automatic transmission

Chronology
- Predecessor: Turbo-Hydramatic 125
- Successor: GM 6T40 transmission

The 4T40-E and 4T45-E are a series of automatic transaxles from General Motors. Designed for transverse engine configurations, the series includes 4 forward gears. The 4Txx family replaced the Turbo-Hydramatic 125 transverse three speed automatic introduced in 1980.

The "-E" series is electronically controlled and features an automatic overdrive transaxle with an electronically controlled torque converter clutch. Since non-electronic versions of these transmissions do not exist, it is conventional to refer to these models as simply 4T40 and 4T45, leaving out the "-E".

The 4T40 and 4T45 were assembled at Windsor Transmission in Windsor, Ontario, Canada.

== 4T40 ==
The "MN4" 4T40E is able to handle vehicles up to 4000 lb (1814 kg) GVWR. The final drive ratio can vary depending on the car's curb weight and engine power output. 3.05, 3.29, 3.42, 3.63, 3.69, 3.91 are all of the available ratios used in the 4T40 (and 4T45) transmission; Made possible by using combinations selected from 3 different sprocket combinations (32/38, 33/37 35/35) and 2 differentials (3.29, 3.05). It is designed for 1.5–3.1 L engines producing up to 190 ft·lbf (258 N·m) of torque.

The 4T40E came with 3 different bellhousing patterns, the GM Metric Pattern (for V6 Applications and 2.2 4 cylinder pushrod engine ) GM Ecotec 4-Cylinder Pattern and the GM Quad 4 4 cylinder bolt pattern.

Gear ratios:

1	2	3	4	R
2.95	1.62	1.00	0.68	2.14

Applications:

- 1999-2002 Daewoo Nubira
- 1999-2002 Daewoo Lanos
- 1995–2005 Chevrolet Cavalier
- 1995-1996 Chevrolet Corsica
- 1995–2005 Pontiac Sunfire
- 1997–2003 Chevrolet Malibu
- 1999–2005 Pontiac Grand Am
- 1999–2004 Oldsmobile Alero
- 1997–1999 Oldsmobile Cutlass
- 2000-2005 Saturn L-Series

== 4T45 ==
Minor design changes provided the 4T40E an increased torque capacity, producing the 4T45E. The "MN5" 4T45E is able to handle vehicles up to 4,500 lb (2,041 kg) GVWR. Final drive ratios include 3.05, 3.29, 3.63 and 3.91. This same transmission is used in the Saturn Vue Green Line hybrid vehicle with the addition of an auxiliary oil pump and hybrid-aware electronics. It is designed for 3.0–3.5 L engines producing up to 205 ft·lbf (278 N·m) of torque, but was also commonly mated to some versions of GM's 4-cylinder Ecotec line.

The 4T45E came with two different bellhousing patterns, the GM Metric Pattern (for V6 Applications) and the GM Ecotec 4-Cylinder Pattern.

Gear ratios:

1	2	3	4	R
2.95	1.62	1.00	0.68	2.14

Applications:

- 3.63:1
  - 2005-2010 Chevrolet Cobalt
  - 2005-2010 Pontiac Pursuit
  - Pontiac Grand Am 2.2/2.4
  - 2006-2009 Pontiac G6 2.4
  - 2005-2007 Saturn Ion
  - Saturn Vue Green Line
  - Chevrolet Malibu 2.2
- 3.05:1
  - 1999-2002 Oldsmobile Alero 3.4
  - 1999-2005 Pontiac Grand Am SE & SE1 w/ LA1 3400
- 3.29:1
  - Chevrolet Malibu Maxx 3.5
  - Chevrolet HHR SS
  - Pontiac G6 GT
  - Pontiac Grand Am GT & GT1
- 3.91:1
  - Pontiac G6 base
  - Chevrolet HHR LS & LT
  - Saturn Vue XE

== See also ==
- List of GM transmissions
