= Buick Verano =

Buick Verano may refer to:

- Buick Verano (North America), sold in the United States and Canada from 2011 to 2016
- Buick Verano (China), manufactured by SAIC-GM and sold in China since 2015
