= Chevrolet Cobalt =

Compact car

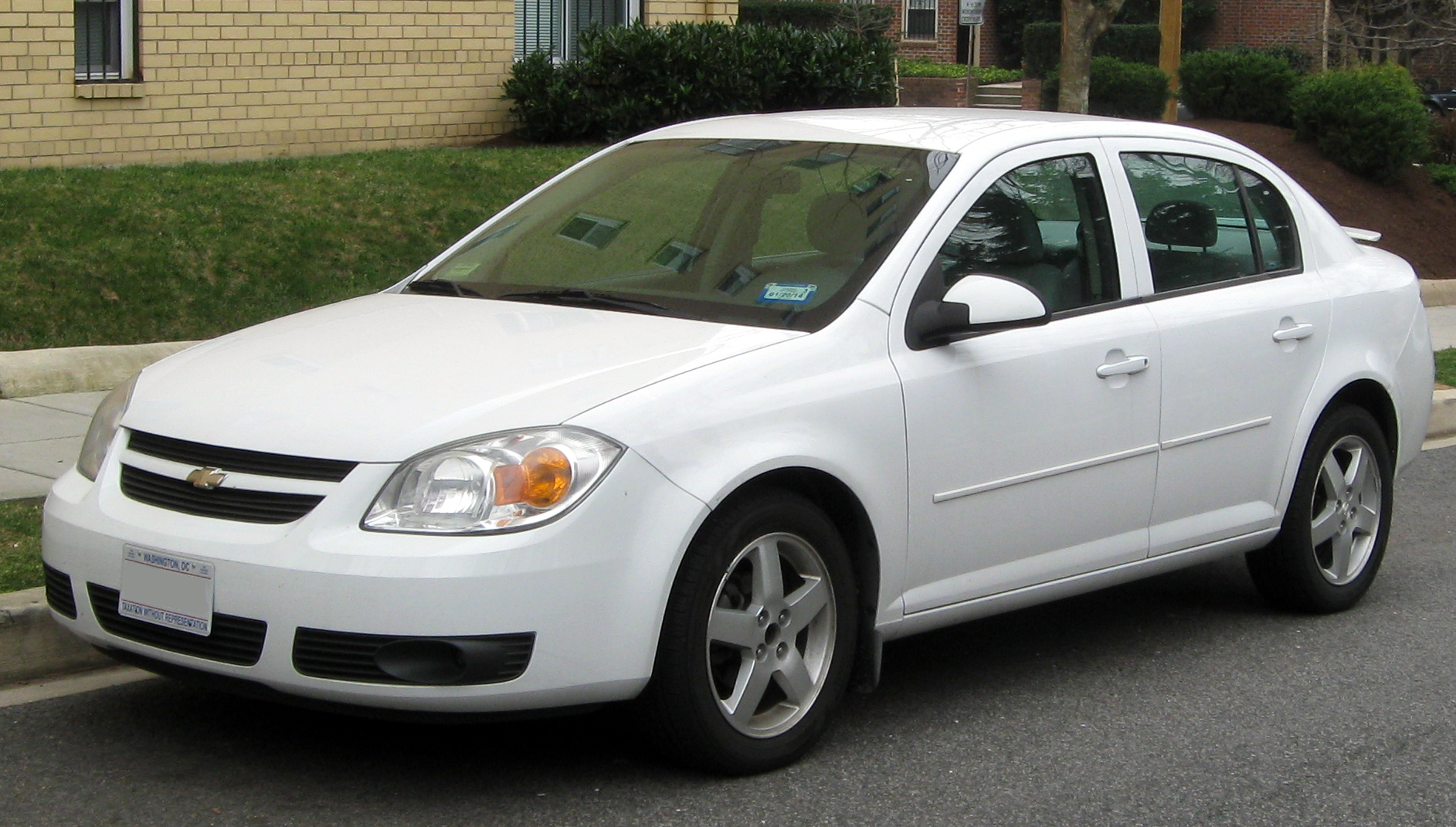

Overview
- Manufacturer: General Motors
- Production: 2004–2010, 2012–present
- Model years: 2005–2010 (North America)

Body and chassis
- Class: Compact car
- Layout: Front engine, front wheel drive

Chronology
- Predecessor: Geo/Chevrolet Prizm (Cobalt); Chevrolet Cavalier (Cobalt); Pontiac Sunfire (G5)
- Successor: Chevrolet Cruze (Cobalt); Buick Verano (G5); Chevrolet Onix (3rd generation)

The Chevrolet Cobalt is a compact car that was introduced by Chevrolet in 2004 for the 2005 model year. The Cobalt replaced both the Cavalier and the Toyota-based Geo/Chevrolet Prizm as Chevrolet's compact car. The Cobalt was available as both a coupe and sedan, as well as a sport compact version dubbed the Cobalt SS. Like the Chevrolet HHR and the Saturn ION, it was based on the GM Delta platform.

A Pontiac version was sold in the United States and Mexico under the G5 name for 2007–2009. It was sold as the Pontiac G4 in Mexico for 2005–2006 and as the Pontiac G5 in Canada for its entire run (where it was briefly known as the Pontiac Pursuit and later Pontiac G5 Pursuit). The G5 replaced the Cavalier-related Pontiac Sunfire. While the Cobalt was available as a 2-door coupe and a 4-door sedan in all markets it was offered in, the G5 was only available as a coupé in the United States while a sedan version was sold alongside the coupé in Canada and Mexico.

As with their predecessors, all Cobalts and its Pontiac equivalents were manufactured at GM's plant in Ramos Arizpe, Mexico and Lordstown, Ohio. The United States Environmental Protection Agency classified the Cobalt as a subcompact car.

== First generation (2005–2010) ==
First generation
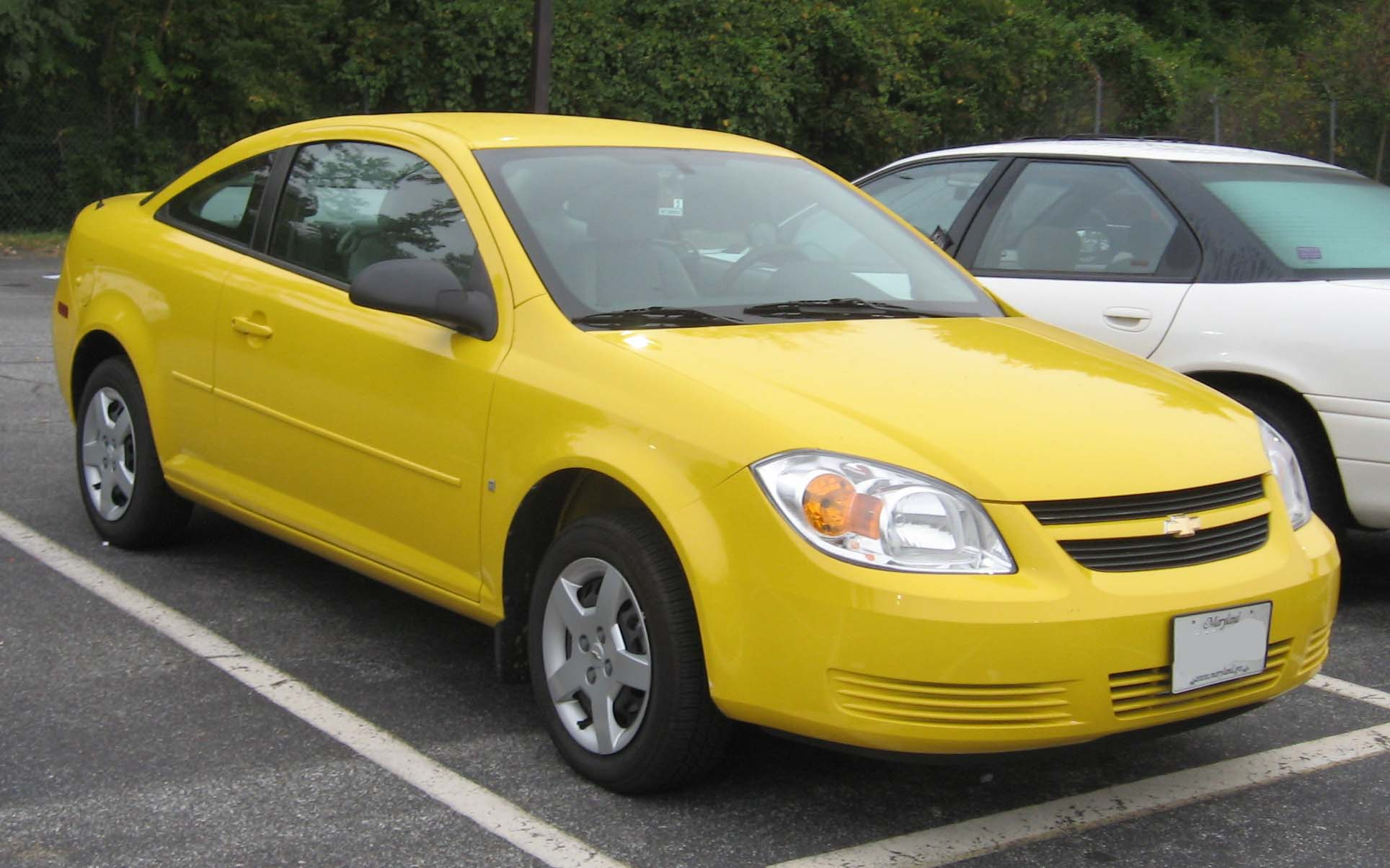

Overview
- Also called: Pontiac G5 (2007–2010); Pontiac Pursuit (2005–2006, Canada); Pontiac G5 Pursuit (2006 only, Canada); Pontiac G4 (2005–2006, Mexico)
- Production: 2004–2010
- Model years: 2005–2010
- Assembly: Lordstown, Ohio, U.S. Ramos Arizpe, Mexico
- Designer: Phil Zak

Body and chassis
- Body style: 2-door coupe 4-door sedan
- Platform: Delta platform/GMX001
- Related: Chevrolet Cobalt SS; Chevrolet HHR; Saturn ION

Powertrain
- Engine: 2.0 L LNF turbo I4; 2.0 L LSJ S/C I4; 2.2 L L61/LAP I4; 2.4 L LE5 I4
- Transmission: 5-speed F35 (MU3) manual 5-speed Getrag F23 manual 4-speed 4T45 automatic

Dimensions
- Wheelbase: 103.3 in (2,624 mm)
- Length: 180.5 in (4,585 mm) (coupe); 180.3 in (4,580 mm) (sedan)
- Width: 67.9 in (1,725 mm)
- Height: 57.1 in (1,450 mm) (sedan); 55.5 in (1,410 mm) (coupe)
- Curb weight: 1,246 kg (2,747 lb) (sedan); 1,216 kg (2,681 lb) (coupe)

Chronology
- Predecessor: Chevrolet Cavalier; Chevrolet Prizm; Pontiac Sunfire (G5)
- Successor: Chevrolet Cruze (Cobalt & G5); Buick Verano (G5)

=== Specifications ===
The front suspension was independent with MacPherson struts, while a semi-independent torsion beam was used in the rear. The wheelbase was 103.3 in (2,624 mm), longer than its competitors, and the width was 68.4 in (1,737 mm). Weight was average in-class, at 2,681 lb (1,216 kg) for the coupe and 2,747 lb (1,246 kg) for the sedan. For 2009, the United States Environmental Protection Agency fuel economy was increased to 24 mpg_{‑US} (9.8 L/100 km; 29 mpg_{‑imp}) city/34 mpg_{‑US} (6.9 L/100 km; 41 mpg_{‑imp}) highway with automatic transmission, and 26 mpg_{‑US} (9.0 L/100 km; 31 mpg_{‑imp}) city/37 mpg_{‑US} (6.4 L/100 km; 44 mpg_{‑imp}) highway with manual transmission. The engine output was increased to 155 hp (116 kW).

=== Year-to-year changes ===
- 2005: Initially released with the L61 2.2 Ecotec in-line 4 cylinder with DOHC and 4 valves per cylinder putting out 145 hp (108 kW) at 5600 RPM, and 155 lb⋅ft (210 N⋅m) at 4000 RPM. Later in the year a Cobalt SS coupe was added to the line-up, fitted with the LSJ, Eaton M62 supercharged version of the 2.0 Ecotec engine. With a relatively high 9.5:1 compression ratio and 12.0 PSI of boost, it develops 205 hp (153 kW) at 5600 RPM and 200 ft⋅lb (271 N⋅m) at 4000 RPM. This delivered lively performance of 0-60MPH in 6 seconds and a standing quarter of 14.4 seconds.
- 2006: A naturally aspirated SS was added to the lineup. This car was equipped with the LE5 2.4 Ecotec engine with VVT on the intake and exhaust and a 10.4:1 compression ratio developing 173 hp (129 kW) at 6200 RPM and 163 ft⋅lb (221 N⋅m) at 4800 RPM. This provided performance of 0-60MPH in about 7.1 seconds and standing quarter time of 15.6s. The LS became the base model while the LT was marketed as a mid-range package; the top level trim was now the LTZ. In addition, as with most other GM vehicles that year, GM's Mark of Excellence symbol was added to both front fenders near the doors.
- 2007: The 2.2L engine was retuned and now developed 148 hp (110 kW) at 5600 RPM and 152 ft⋅lb (206 N⋅m) at 4200 RPM while retaining the same fuel economy. Other changes include a new console, new steering wheel and new radio head unit that features an audio input jack. In addition, all models now used a 5x110 wheel bolt pattern, except the LS and LT1 which retained the 4x100 bolt pattern. In addition, the 2007 model year marked the introduction of a new 32-bit computer that replaced the 16-bit unit from 2006.
- 2008: The 2.4 L naturally aspirated, high-output SS coupe and SS sedan were renamed to just "Sport Coupe" and "Sport Sedan" respectively. The 2.4 engine is also now rated with slightly less power but more torque at 171 hp (128 kW)@ 6200 RPM and 167 ft⋅lb (226 N⋅m)@ 4800 RPM. At mid-year, fuel economy was improved to 25.3 mpg_{‑US} (9.3 L/100 km; 30.4 mpg_{‑imp}) city, 36.2 mpg_{‑US} (6.50 L/100 km; 43.5 mpg_{‑imp}) highway on the LS and 1LT, coupe and sedan models with manual transmission; now labeled with XFE badging (X-tra Fuel Economy). XM Radio, side-impact air bags for improved safety, and MP3 player were now standard instead of optional. StabiliTrak stability control system was introduced. Other changes included the adding and removal of several exterior and interior colors. The new facelifted Cobalt SS 2-dr coupe launched near the end of May 2008 with the LNF version of the Ecotec engine replacing the LSJ. This turbocharged 2.0 liter engine with direct injection and VVT and a compression ratio of 9.2:1 has maximum boost of 20 psi (1.4 bar), delivering 260 hp (190 kW) at 5300 rpm and 260 ft⋅lb (350 N⋅m) of torque from 2500 to 5250 rpm. The SS turbo was quick, with a 0-60MPH time of just 5.5 seconds and quarter mile of about 14 seconds.
- 2008 (Special Edition "Revolution" Package): The special edition package for the Cobalt was introduced on August 16, 2008, which featured all the options that were available on the previous SS models except the turbocharged 2.0 engine. Instead it was once again built with the 2.4 naturally aspirated engine similar to the Cobalt Sport models. The special edition package could come with a sunroof, GM ground effects kit, the Getrag F23 5-speed manual transmission, and additionally the 5 lug wheel hubs that the SS editions featured. The special editions all had a "Special Edition" badge and came with unique variations of colors, and racing stripes.
- 2009: The 2.4 L naturally aspirated "Sport Coupe and "Sport Sedan" models were both deleted, along with the 2.2 L L61 engine. Both were replaced by the 2.2 L LAP engine which featured dual VVT and 10.0:1 compression ratio thus providing better fuel economy and more power (155 hp (116 kW))@6100RPM. Also, a 2.0 LNF Turbo SS sedan was added to the lineup. Three exterior colors were changed, and an interior color deleted. Bluetooth capabilities were added. An option for a reconfigurable performance display available on the SS coupe, could read out various engine output data and alter performance settings.
- 2009 (Team Canada Edition Package): For Canada, a "Team Canada Edition Package" was offered beginning in 2009 and continuing into the 2010 model year for the LT.
- 2010: The car was replaced by the Chevy Cruze. In Canada, the Team Canada Edition Package was now standard on all LT models, and side-impact head curtain air bags were finally standard on all models.

=== Safety ===
According to the Insurance Institute for Highway Safety (IIHS) the Cobalt receives an overall top score of "Good" for front collisions. However, it receives a "Poor" overall score for side impacts without side curtain airbags, and an "Acceptable" overall score with side curtain airbags. In 2008, side curtain airbags became standard, but the Cobalt's structure remains the same and consequently in structure/safety category of the IIHS's side impact test the Cobalt receives a "Marginal" score. Side airbags are limited to the curtain type; torso type side airbags are unavailable. According to the IIHS's injury measurements taken from the side impact test, the driver's torso is given a "Marginal" score.

The IIHS also found 2005-08 model year Cobalts had the highest fatality rate in the small 4 door car class, with 117 deaths per million registered years compared to its class average of 71.

2010 NHTSA sedan crash test:

- Frontal Driver:
- Frontal Passenger:
- Side Driver:
- Side Rear Passenger:
- Rollover:

Before 2009 the Cobalt only offered stability control as an option on Sport models.

=== Defects and recalls ===
In early 2007, 98,000 Cobalt coupes from the 2005–06 model years were recalled after it was discovered they did not meet federal safety requirements because of a lack of adequate padding in a specific area of the vehicle's trim. This resulted in an unacceptable vulnerability to head injuries, though GM claimed the vulnerability would only affect motorists not wearing a seat belt.

On March 2, 2010, GM announced a recall of 1.3 million compact cars in North America, including the Chevrolet Cobalt, because of power steering problems. GM implemented the repair on older models before fixing more recent models, as the car was replaced by the Chevrolet Cruze in late 2010. The Pontiac G5 and its international variants were also affected, though GM had already ended production of the Pontiac brand by that point.

On September 28, 2012, GM announced a recall of 40,859 cars including the Chevrolet Cobalt from the 2007-09 model year because of a potential fuel leak. Although the recall was limited to five states, vehicles from other southern states were covered for repair when summer heat caused cracks in the fuel reservoir assembly. The fuel vapor leak could be detected during hot days by a gasoline smell in the vicinity of the car.

Faulty ignition switches in the Cobalts, which cut power to the car while in motion, were eventually linked to many crashes resulting in fatalities, starting with a teenager in 2005 who drove her new Cobalt into a tree. The switch continued to be used in the manufacture of the vehicles even after the problem was known to GM. On February 21, 2014, GM recalled over 700,000 Cobalts for issues traceable to the defective ignition switches. In May 2014 the NHTSA fined the company $35 million for failing to recall cars with faulty ignition switches for a decade, despite knowing there was a problem with the switches. Thirteen deaths were linked to the faulty switches during the time the company failed to recall the cars.

=== Engines ===
Years	Engine	Power	Torque
2005–2006	2.2 L Ecotec L61 I4	145 hp (108 kW)	155 lb⋅ft (210 N⋅m)
2007–2008	2.2 L Ecotec L61 I4	148 hp (110 kW)	155 lb⋅ft (210 N⋅m)
2009–2010	2.2 L Ecotec LAP I4	155 hp (116 kW)	150 lb⋅ft (203 N⋅m)
2006	2.4 L Ecotec LE5 I4	173 hp (129 kW)	163 lb⋅ft (221 N⋅m)
2007–2008	2.4 L Ecotec LE5 I4	171 hp (128 kW)	167 lb⋅ft (226 N⋅m)
2005–2007	2.0 L Ecotec LSJ S/C I4	205 hp (153 kW)	200 lb⋅ft (271 N⋅m)
2008–2010	2.0 L Ecotec LNF Turbo I4	260 hp (194 kW)	260 lb⋅ft (353 N⋅m)

=== Sales ===
Model Year	U.S. Sales
2004	4,960
2005	212,667
2006	211,451
2007	200,621
2008	188,045
2008 Special Edition SS	5,000
2009	104,724
2010	97,376
2011	127,472

=== Pontiac G5 ===
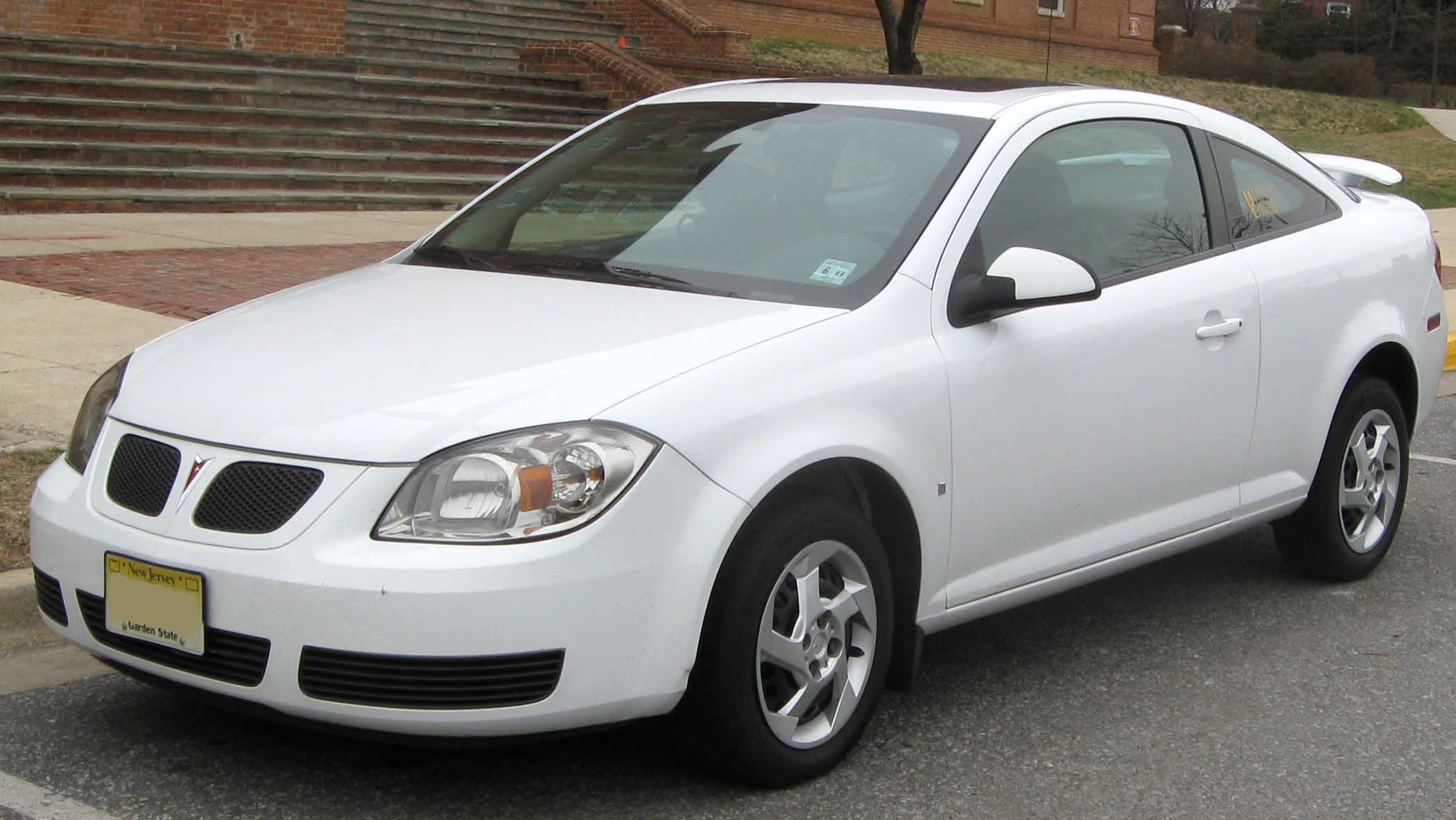
Pontiac G5

The Pontiac G5 was a rebadged version of the Chevrolet Cobalt.

In Canada, a rebadged variant of the Cobalt called the Pontiac Pursuit was sold from 2005 to 2006 as a sedan only. In 2006, another version of the vehicle was released in Canada, now called the Pontiac G5 Pursuit, and it was now available as both a sedan and a coupe. In Mexico, the vehicle was called the Pontiac G4 and was sold as both a sedan and a coupe from 2005 to 2006.

In the United States, the Pontiac G5 went on sale in 2006 as a 2007 model, serving as the replacement for the Pontiac Sunfire, and was only available as a coupe. In Canada and Mexico, the Pontiac G5 went on sale in early 2007 as a 2007 model, available as both a sedan and coupe.

General Motors discontinued the Pontiac G5 in the United States in 2009, and it was discontinued in Canada and Mexico in 2010. The Chevrolet Cruze served as a replacement for both the Chevrolet Cobalt and Pontiac G5.

=== Replacement ===
In 2009, Chevrolet launched the Cobalt's eventual successor, the Chevrolet Cruze (based on the new Delta II platform), in Europe, with launches in other markets (including the US) following in 2010. The Cobalt ended production on June 23, 2010. With the discontinuation of the Pontiac brand by GM in 2010, the Buick Verano is marketed as the G5's successor in Canada, while the Cruze serves as a de facto replacement for the Pontiac G5 in the United States.

=== Gallery ===
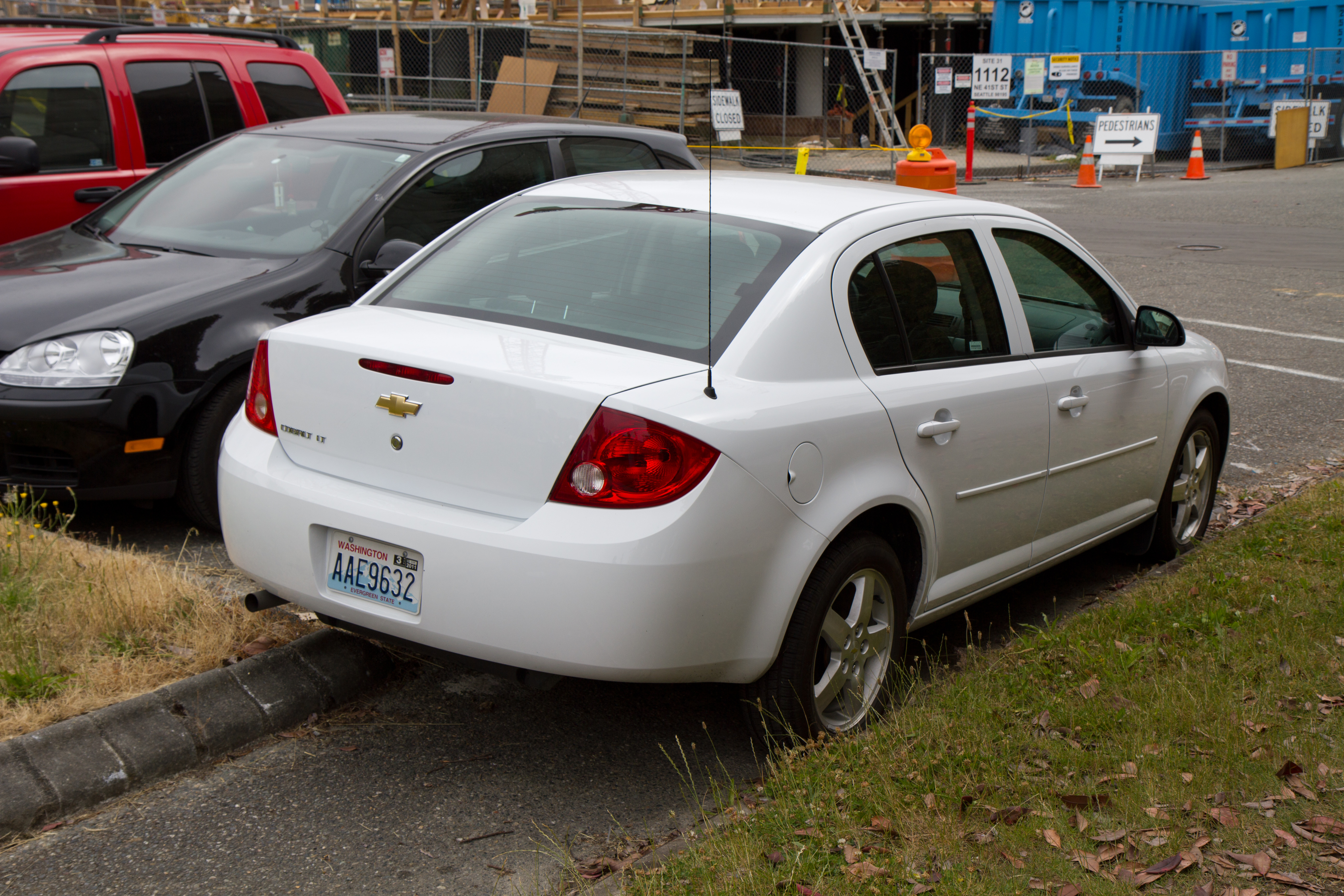
Chevrolet Cobalt sedan

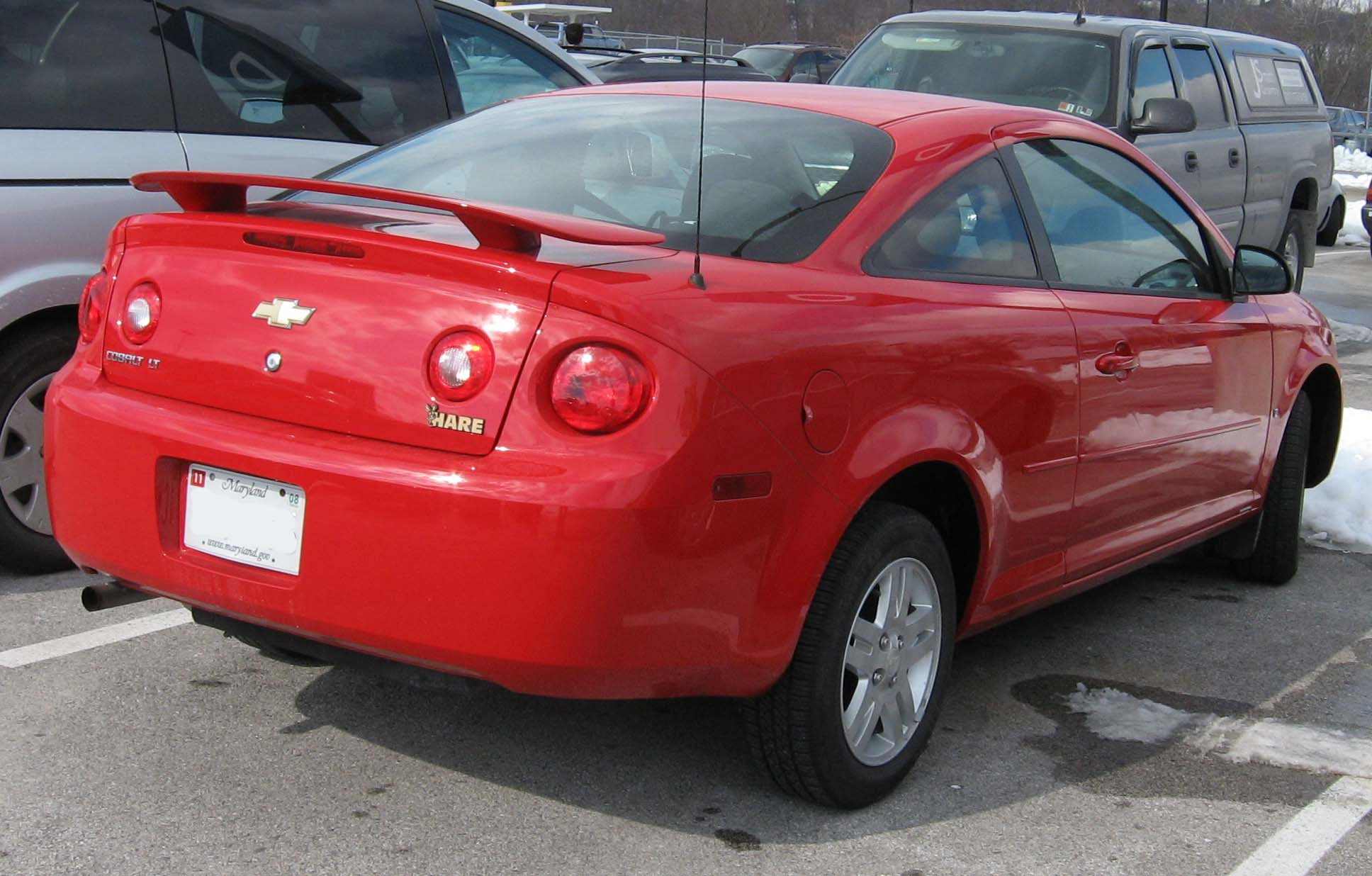
Chevrolet Cobalt coupe

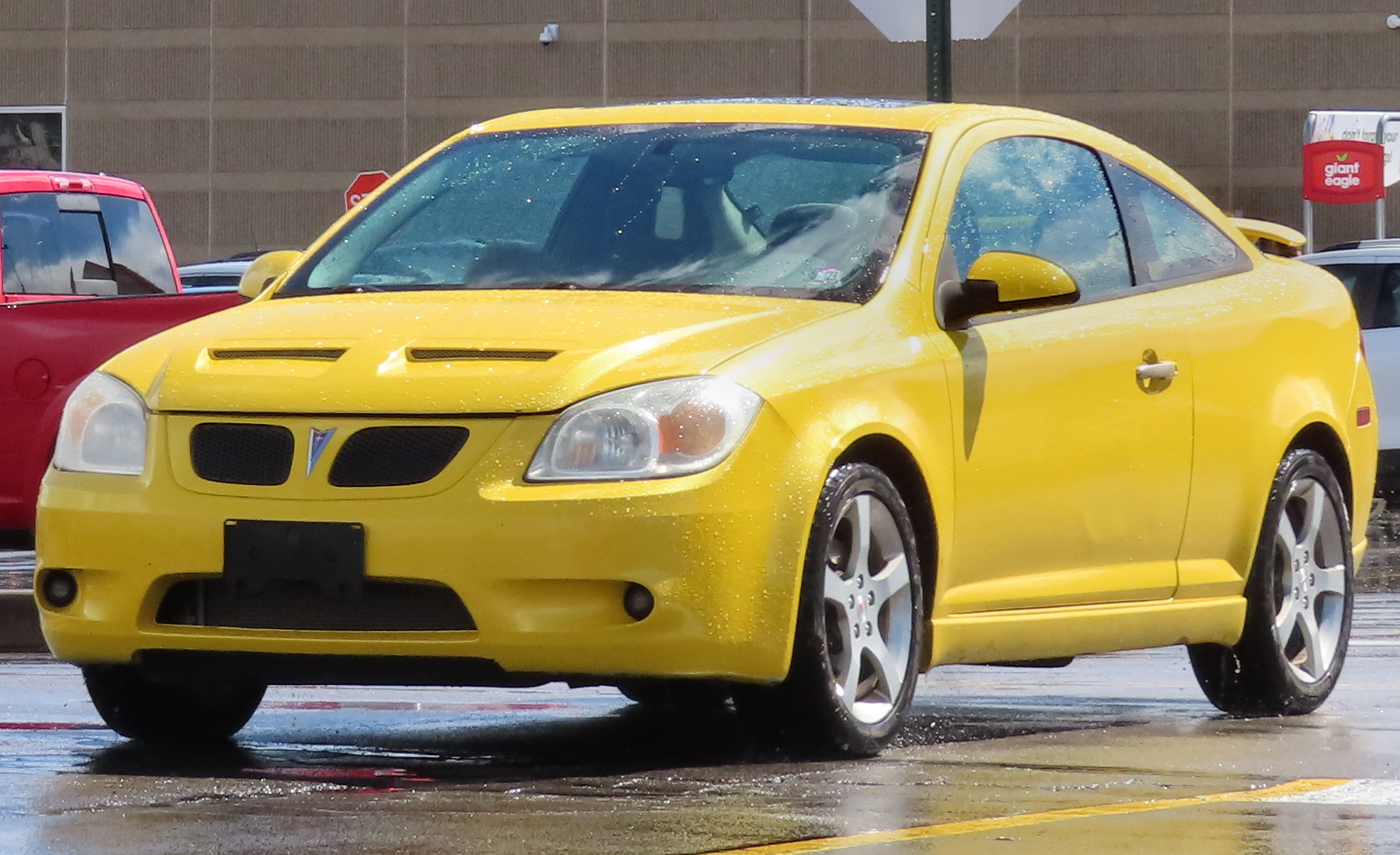
Pontiac G5 GT coupe

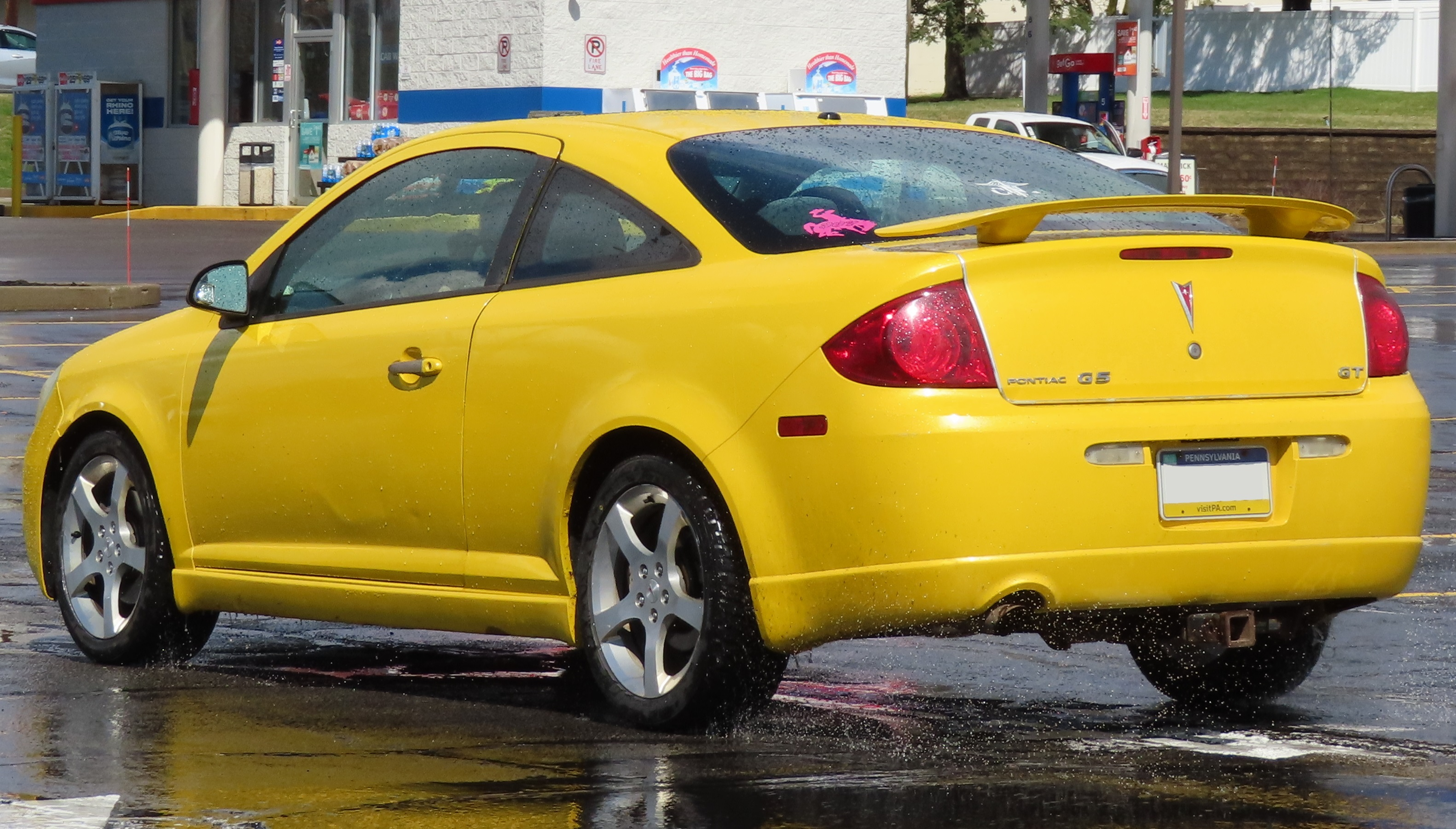
Pontiac G5 GT Coupe

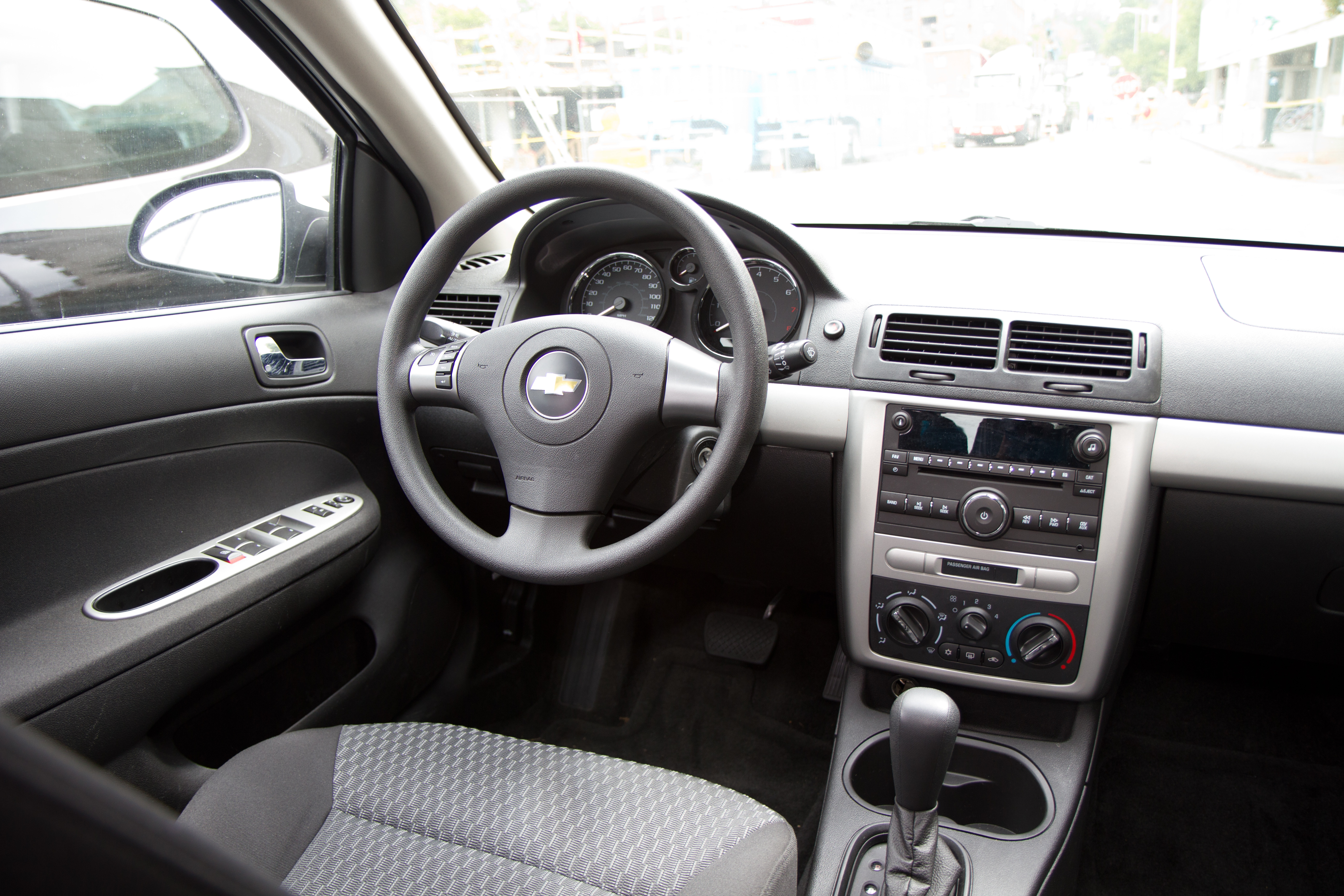
Interior

== Second generation (2011) ==
Second generation
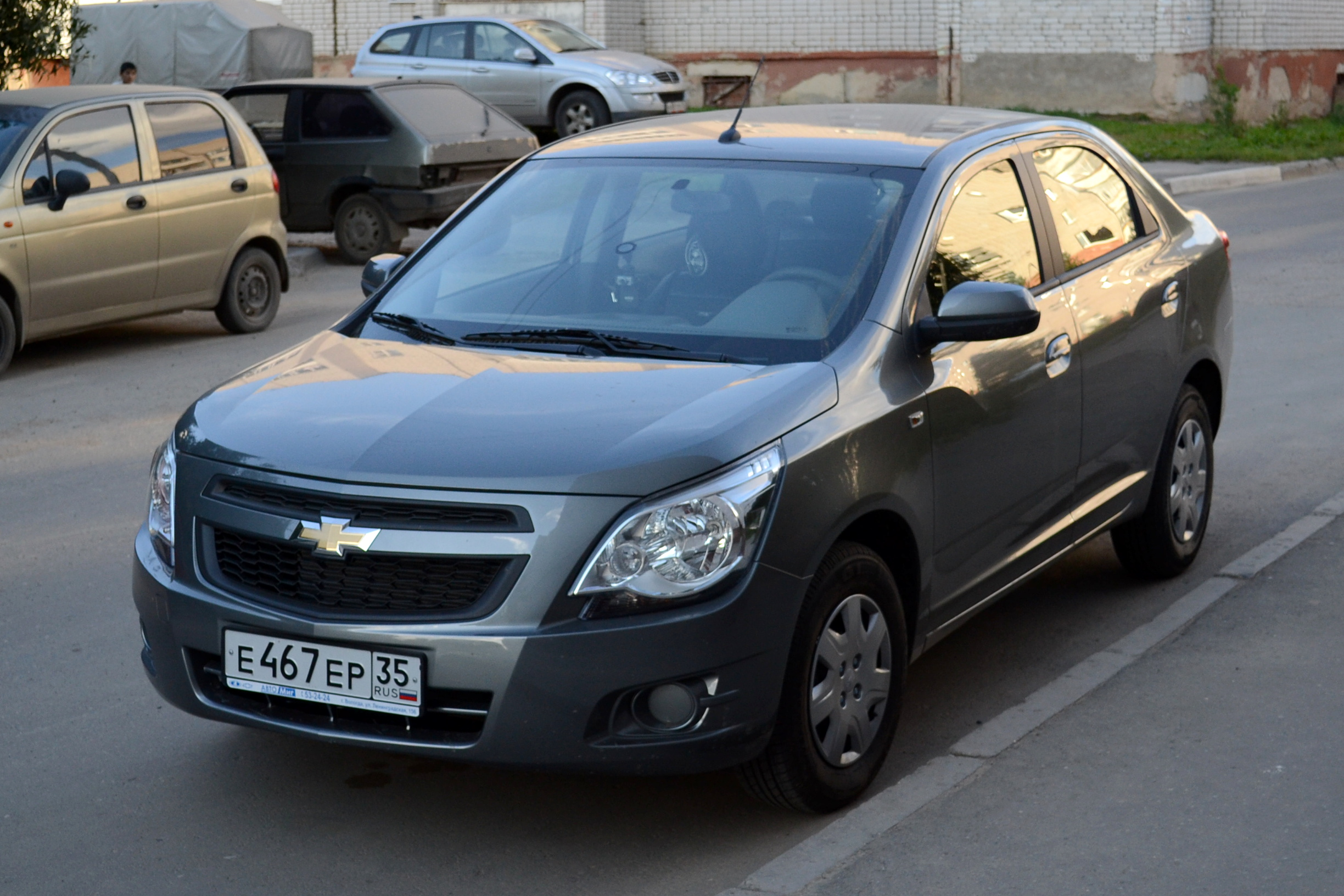
- Chevrolet Cobalt (pre-facelift)

Overview
- Also called: Ravon R4 (Uzbekistan, 2016–2020)
- Production: 2011–2019 (Brazil); 2012–2016 (Colombia); 2013–present (Uzbekistan); 2020–present (Kazakhstan)
- Model years: 2012–present
- Assembly: Brazil: São Caetano do Sul (GM Brazil); Uzbekistan: Asaka (GM Uzbekistan/UzAuto Motors); Colombia: Bogotá (GM Colombia); Azerbaijan: Hajiqabul (AzerMash: 2021–present); Kazakhstan: Kostanay (SaryarkaAvtoProm)

Body and chassis
- Body style: 4-door sedan
- Platform: Gamma II platform
- Related: Chevrolet Spin; Chevrolet Sonic

Powertrain
- Engine: 1.4 L I4 flex-fuel 1.8 L I4 flex-fuel 1.5 L I4 gasoline
- Transmission: 6-speed manual 6-speed automatic

Dimensions
- Wheelbase: 2,620 mm (103 in)
- Length: 4,479 mm (176.3 in)
- Width: 1,735 mm (68.3 in)
- Height: 1,514 mm (59.6 in)
- Curb weight: 1,091–1,137 kg (2,405–2,507 lb)

Chronology
- Predecessor: Chevrolet Astra (Latin America); Chevrolet Viva (Russia)
- Successor: Chevrolet Onix Plus (Latin America)

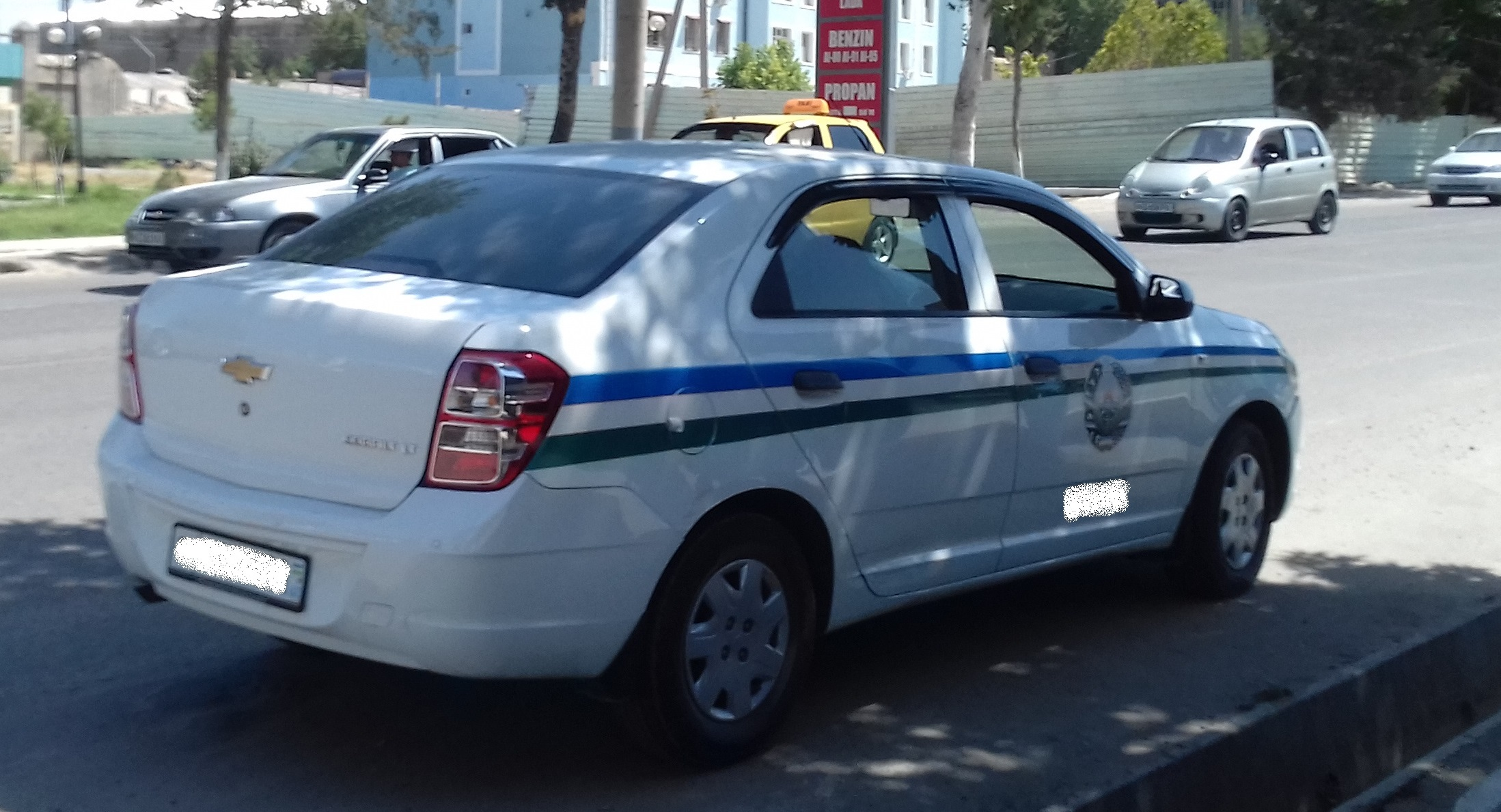
Chevrolet Cobalt LT Uzbekistan Police car (rear view)

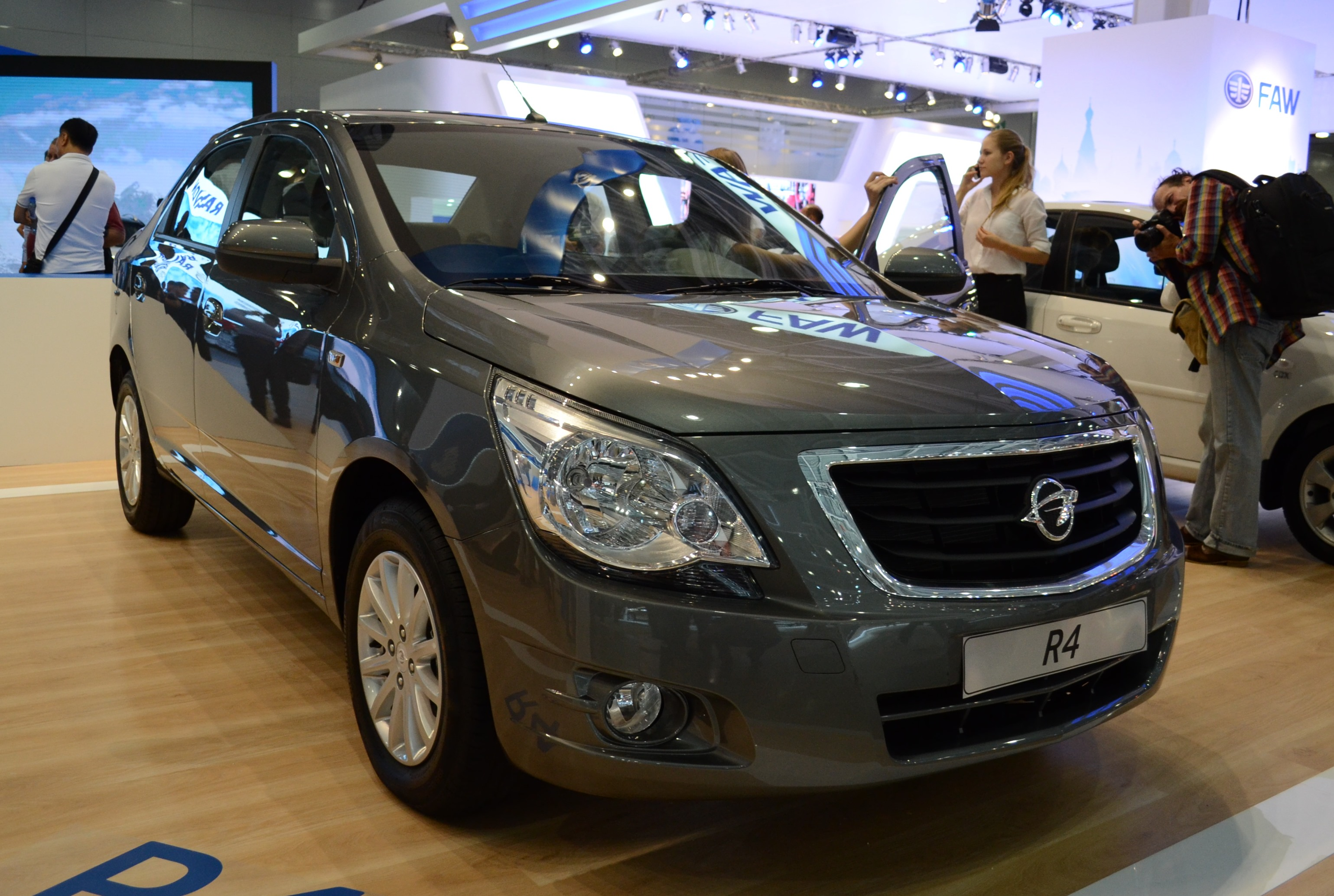
Ravon R4 (Russia)

In 2011, General Motors Brazil introduced a new model bearing the Cobalt name in the Brazilian market. This Cobalt replaced the aging local Chevrolet Astra. The car is equipped with a 1.4 Econo.Flex engine, in 2013 the 1.8 version was introduced with LS, LT, LTZ versions . The transmissions initially available were a 5-speed manual, later a 6-speed automatic, the GF6, and in the 1.8 versions after the facelift, there were also 6-speed manual options. Although sporting a similar front end style, it is not directly related to the Chevrolet Agile, since it shares the overall underpinnings with the 2011 Chevrolet Sonic, while the Agile is derived from the considerably older Opel Corsa B, from 1993.

Chevrolet had no plans to bring the Cobalt to the North American market, which already had the Chevrolet Sonic and Chevrolet Spark as the subcompact cars in the continent. In GM Brazil's line-up, it is situated above the Chevrolet Prisma and below the Chevrolet Cruze.

In January 2013, the Cobalt was launched in the Russian market, where it was imported from Uzbekistan. There, it was offered with a 1.5-liter engine, producing 77 kW (105 PS) and 134 N⋅m (99 lb⋅ft). The Cobalt was retired in Russia in December 2015, when Chevrolet decided to minimize its presence only to its iconic models. However, in late 2016, it was reintroduced under the new Ravon marque as the Ravon R4.

The Chevrolet Cobalt was assembled in Colombia too. It was equipped with a simple range of two versions and a single 1.8-liter 8-valve 106-horsepower engine. With a very discreet commercial performance and a taxi variant, its production in the Colombian market ended in early 2016.

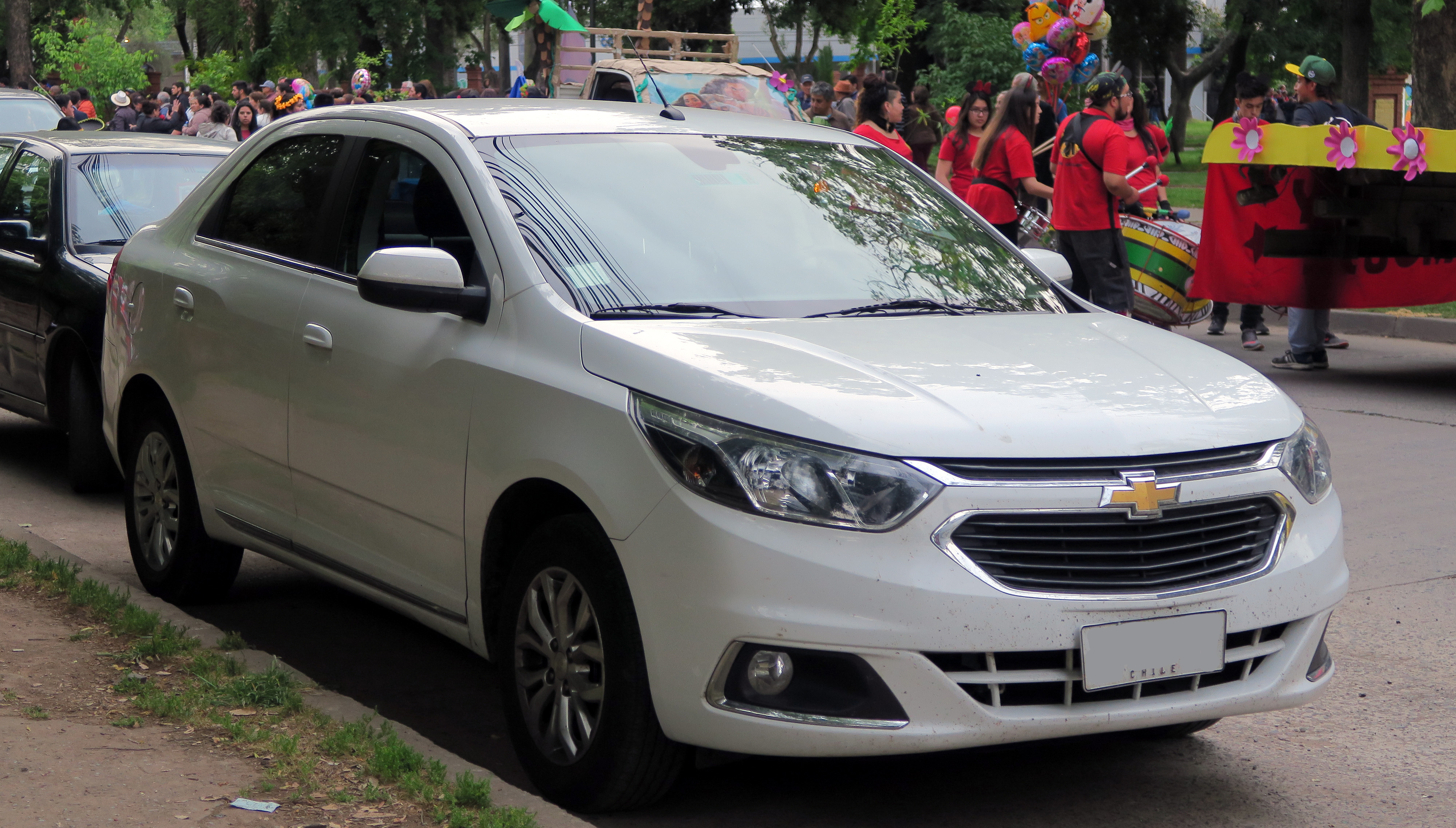
Chevrolet Cobalt LTZ (facelift)

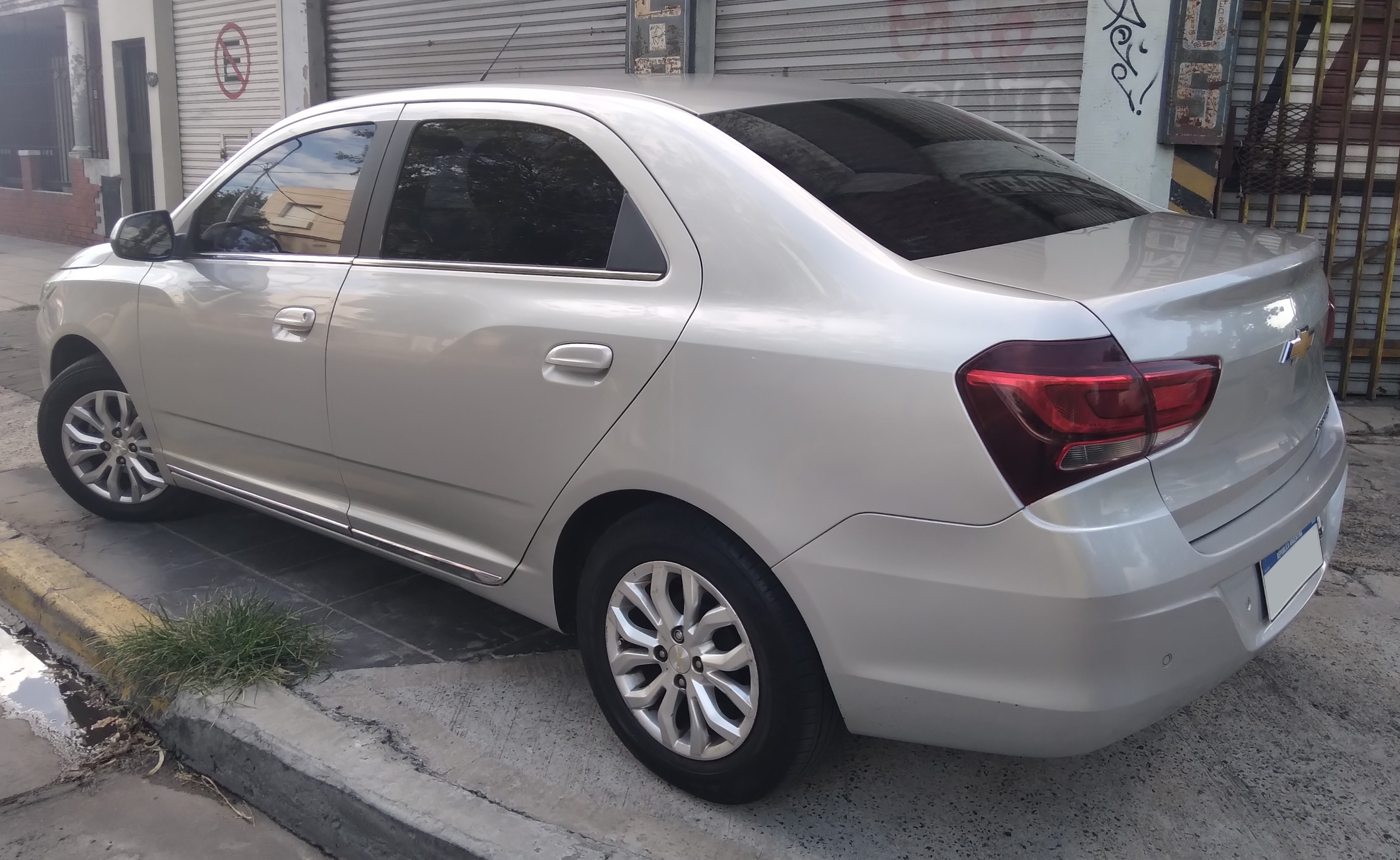
Rear view

The Cobalt received a facelift in late 2015 for the 2016 model year. Its main rivals are the Nissan Versa and the Renault Logan.

In Brazil, production ended in late 2019, with 2020 being the final model year. The Cobalt has been succeeded by the Chevrolet Onix Plus sedan, which achieved higher sales upon its launch in 2019.

After UzAuto phased out the Ravon brand in 2020, the Ravon R4 was once again renamed the Chevrolet Cobalt. The Cobalt / R4 made by UzAuto never received the 2015 facelift seen in other markets.

== Sales ==
Year	Brazil
2011	2,342
2012	66,658
2013	59,690
2014	47,061
2015	22,957
2016	22,467
2017	22,949
2018	21,490
2019	13,103
2020	537
2021	6
