= Grand Am =

Grand Am or Grand-Am can stand for:

- Pontiac Grand Am, the name of several different automobiles by General Motors
- Grand-Am Road Racing, a former sanctioning body for road racing competitions in North America
