= Chevrolet Chevelle Laguna =

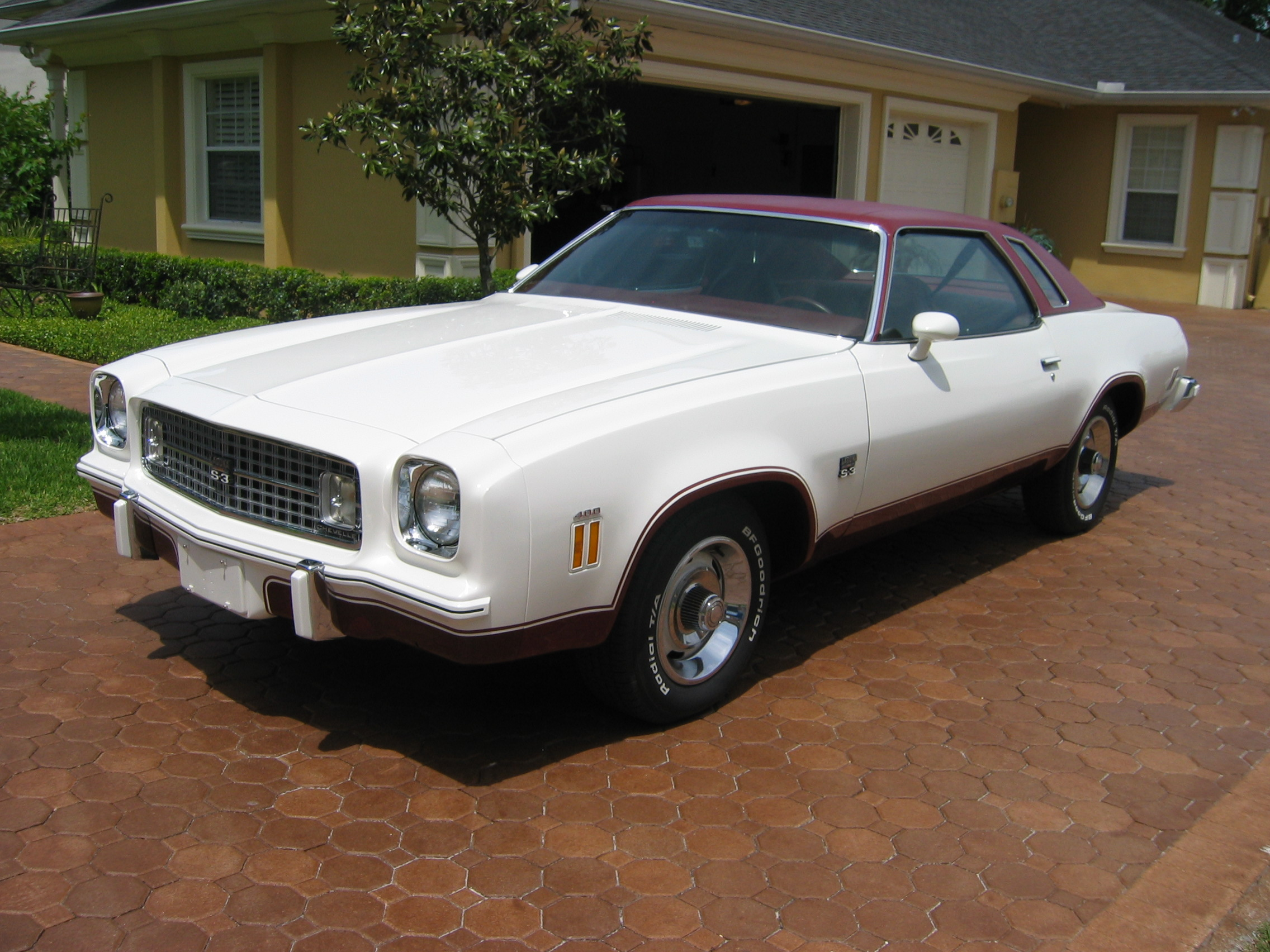
- 1974 Chevrolet Chevelle Laguna Type S-3 Colonnade hardtop coupe

Overview
- Manufacturer: Chevrolet (General Motors)
- Production: 1972–1976
- Model years: 1973–1976
- Assembly: Arlington, Texas, United States; Atlanta, Georgia, United States; Baltimore, Maryland, United States; Flint, Michigan, United States; Framingham, Massachusetts, United States; Fremont, California, United States; Kansas City, Kansas, United States; Van Nuys, California, United States; Oshawa, Ontario, Canada; Sainte-Thérèse, Quebec, Canada

Body and chassis
- Body style: 2-door coupe 4-door sedan (1973); 4-door station wagon (1973)
- Related: Chevrolet Monte Carlo; Pontiac Le Mans, Pontiac Grand Am, Pontiac Grand Prix, Buick Century, Buick Regal, Oldsmobile Cutlass

Powertrain
- Engine: 305 CID small-block V8 (1976); 350 CID small-block V8; 400 CID small-block V8 (1974–76); 454 CID big-block V8 (1973–75)
- Transmission: 3-speed manual 4-speed manual 3-speed auto

Dimensions
- Wheelbase: 112 in (2845 mm) coupe 116 in (2997 mm) sedan/wagon

The Chevrolet Chevelle Laguna is a mid-sized automobile produced by Chevrolet for the 1973 through 1976 model years. Part of the GM A-Body platform, the 1973 Laguna series included coupes, sedans and station wagons. It was the top-line Chevelle series that year positioned above the Malibu. For 1974 through 1976 the car was produced as a one-model Laguna S-3 coupe, the new-for-1974 Malibu Classic series taking the top-luxury series position. All Lagunas sported urethane front-ends which easily distinguished them from other Chevelles. NASCAR driver Cale Yarborough earned the first two of his three consecutive Winston Cup championships piloting a Chevelle Laguna.

== History ==
=== Overview ===
The 1973–1976 Chevelle Lagunas accounted for 108,815 of nearly 1.7 million third generation Chevelle sales. Production included 42,941 1973 Laguna coupes, and 38,790 1974–1976 Laguna Type S-3 coupes, making them relatively rare cars in today's collector market.

Chevrolet honored California beach resorts again by naming the top 1973 Chevelle series "Laguna" with the Malibu taking the middle spot while the base series was called simply "Deluxe". Laguna models featured specific front and rear styling including a body-colored urethane front end concealing the new 5 mph bumper system. On minor impact the urethane nose cone, backed up by shock-absorbing cylinders, deflected and rebounded; Laguna models also featured a specific diecast chrome grille with bowtie emblem, a body-colored (steel) rear bumper, front and rear bumper rub strips, bright roof drip moldings, bright wheel-opening moldings, chrome taillight bezels, full wheel covers, and Laguna fender nameplates. Laguna interiors were more lavish than the Malibu in pattern cloth and vinyl or optional breathable all-vinyl upholstery, distinctive door trim with map pockets, deep-twist carpeting, woodgrain vinyl accents, and Laguna nameplates.

The 1973 Chevelle Laguna "Colonnade" hardtop featured a semi-fastback roofline with styled "B" pillars, frameless door glass and distinctive rear quarter glass on two-door coupes. New side windows with styled center pillars were featured on four-door sedan models. The new-design B pillars were structurally strong enough to contribute to occupant safety in a roll-over type accident. GM had anticipated federal roll-over safety standards for January 1974 that did not materialize. The unusually thin windshield pillars contributed to the much-improved visibility over the previous generation Chevelles. Two Laguna station wagons were introduced, including a Laguna estate. The wagons, available in six- or nine-passenger seating, featured a counterbalanced liftgate which allowed for easy entry and loading up to 85 cubic feet (2.4 m^{3}).

=== New chassis ===
The new top-of-the-line Laguna shared with all 1973 Chevelles the most extensive redesign in their 10-year history. The chassis were as new as the bodies. Wheelbase dimensions were carried over from the second-generation 1968-1972 models, with a sporty 112 inches for coupes and 116 inches for sedans and station wagons on an all-new sturdier perimeter frame with increased front and rear suspension travel, larger, 8½ inch, rear axle, wider, six-inch, wheel rims, refined rear control arm bushings and new shock absorber locations, new body mounts and improved front suspension geometry. The left wheel was adjusted to have slightly more positive camber than the right which resulted in a more uniform and stable steering feel on high-crown road surfaces while maintaining excellent freeway cruising stability. Clearances for spring travel were improved for a smoother ride over all types of surfaces; the coil springs at each wheel were computer-selected to match the individual car's weight. Power brakes with front disc brake calipers were standard on all 1973 Chevelles.

Additional new features were an acoustical double-panel roof, tighter-fitting glass, flush-style outside door handles, molded full foam front- and rear-seat construction, a flow-through power ventilation system, an inside hood release, a refined Delcotron generator and a sealed side-terminal battery, a larger, 22 gallon, fuel tank, and "flush and dry" rocker panels introduced first on the redesigned 1971 full-size Chevrolets. Another structural improvement was a stronger design for the side door guard beams. Options included swiveling Strato-bucket seats (with console) for coupes, a power moonroof, and Turbine I urethane (backed by steel) wheels, as was the instrument gauge cluster.

While lesser Chevelles (except the Malibu SS option) came standard with either a 250-cubic-inch six-cylinder or a 307-cubic-inch two-barrel V8, Lagunas came standard with a 145-horsepower 350-cubic-inch two-barrel V8. Options included a 350 four-barrel V8 of 175 horsepower (130 kW) and a 454 four-barrel V8 rated at 245 horsepower (183 kW). Hardened engine valve seats and hydraulic camshafts made these engines reliable for many miles, and allowed them to accept the increasingly popular unleaded gasoline. A three-speed manual transmission was standard; four-speed manual and Turbo Hydra-Matic three-speed automatic were optional. Crossflow radiators and coolant reservoirs that prevented air from entering the system prevented overheating.

=== Reviews ===
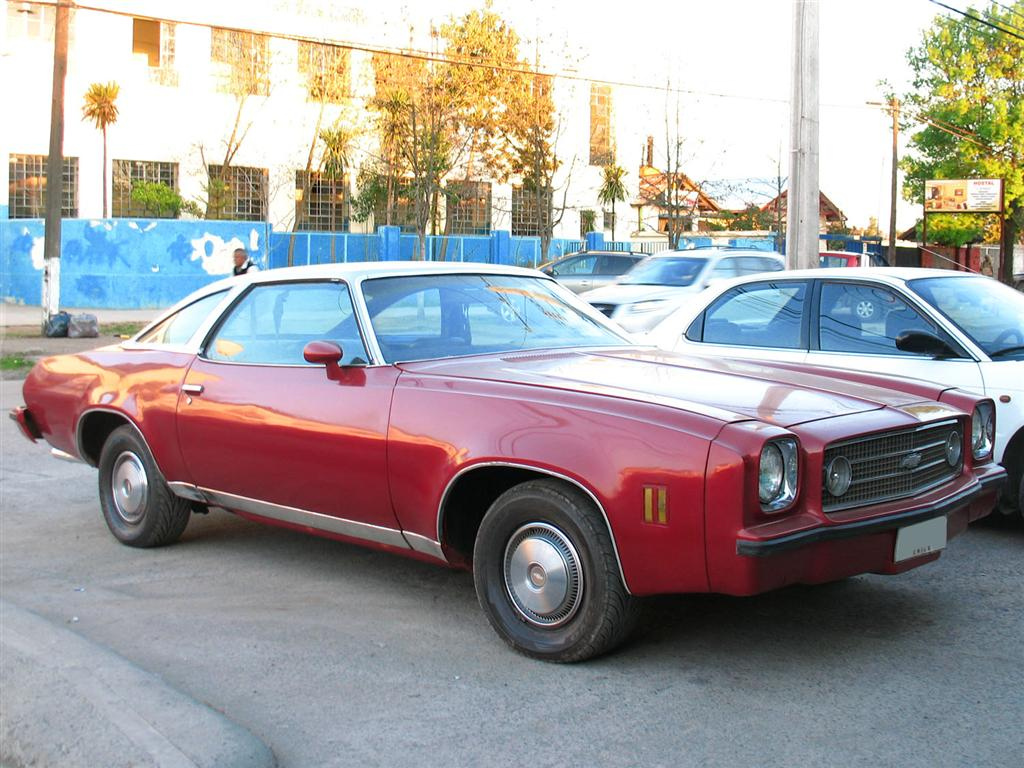
1973 Chevrolet Chevelle Laguna Colonnade hardtop coupe

Speed and Supercar magazine said in a June 1973 "Street Test": "Chevy gets it right on." "Enough is plenty, that's how we feel about the ('73) 350 Laguna. "... We couldn't pass up the opportunity to tell you what a groovy all around car it is even if it can't smoke the quarter-mile run in 13 seconds. And what car in '73 can." "It's not overpowering but it's enough - and so comfortable that the editor bought the car." "The Laguna is the type of car you want to own for fast, comfortable transportation in quiet luxury."

Motor Trend - "1973 Buyers Guide" said: "Chevrolet is fielding an all-new intermediate Chevelle series at a time when competitive lines from Ford and Chrysler are one or more years old...when you look at what the stylists have done with what we used to call the pillar coupe, you might want to rush out and buy some stock in General Motors."

Motor Trend said: "The Grand Am and the Laguna are large "small" cars. Nimble, quick and responsive." "The cleanly styled Laguna has a lot to recommend it. The car has a very tight feeling, a by-product of the heavily ribbed underbody and double paneled roof. Strongly in the Laguna's favor is the integrated, body-colored urethane bumper-front end. It's a lot better looking out-front than the big bumper approach."

Car and Driver said: "Directional stability is so strong on the highway that the Laguna seems locked on some guidance-beam radiated from your destination." "The Laguna's urethane nose cap allows the front end to be flat and free of gaps in this day of jutting bumpers; its block-cut fenders are chauvinistically masculine and no sheet metal is wasted cloaking its tires from view...so the Laguna looks like it could bowl over most of the cars on the road.

=== 1974–1976 Laguna Type S-3 ===
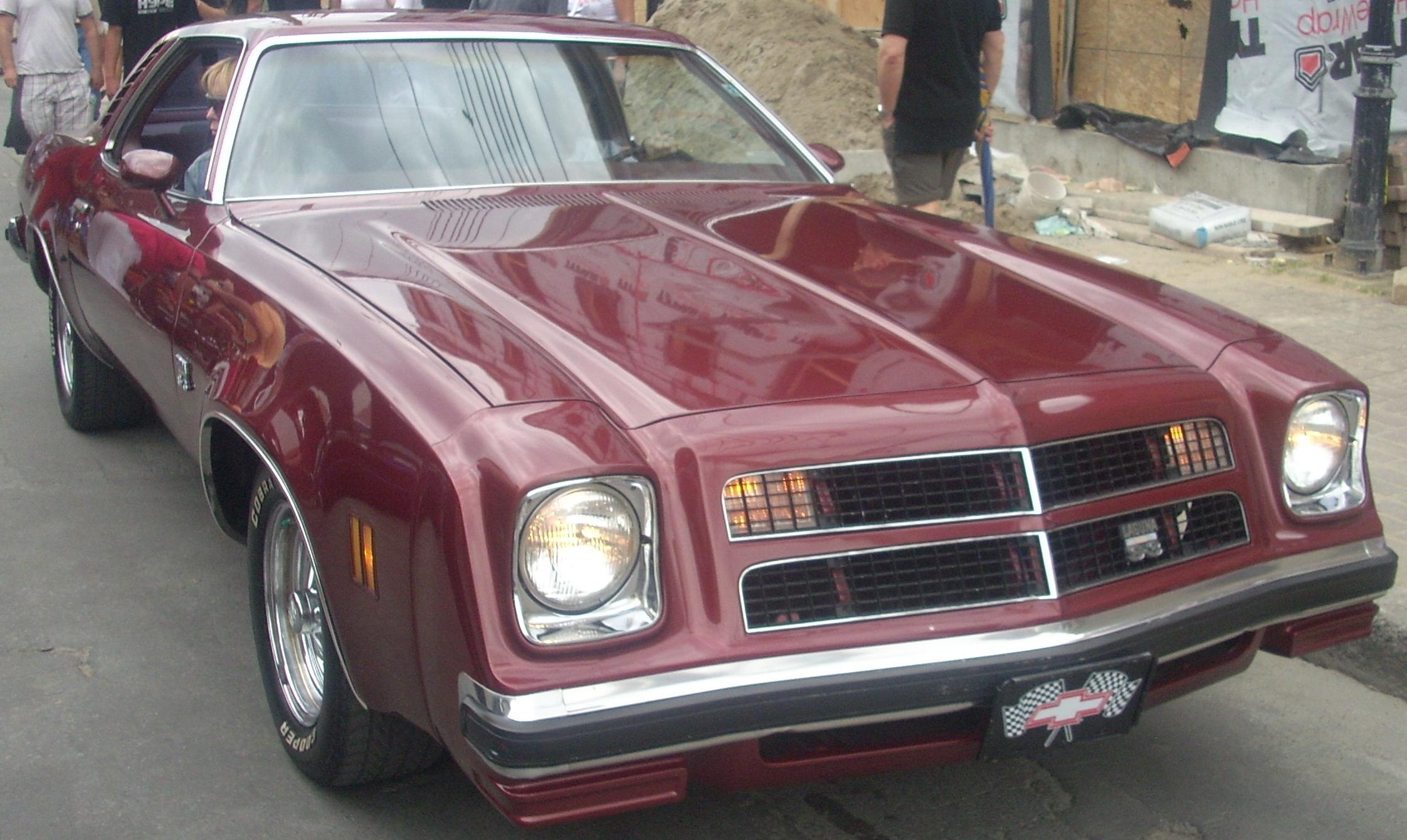
1975 Chevrolet Chevelle Laguna Type S-3 coupe

For 1974, the Laguna was renamed "Laguna Type S-3" and was offered only as the Colonnade coupe. It retained the urethane front end from 1973 with a revised grille and new parking lamps, augmented at the rear by new taillights. A federally-mandated 5 mph (8.0 km/h) chrome rear bumper replaced the body-colored steel 2.5 mph (4.0 km/h) version from 1973. Standard equipment included a console, a vinyl roof, opera-type vertical rear quarter windows which could be covered with horizontal ribs; body side striping, Laguna S3 badging, as well as firmer shocks and springs, a front stabilizer bar, and HR70x15 radial tires on Rally wheels. Front occupants rode in swivel bucket seats, and the driver faced a six-dial instrument cluster and a four-spoke, sport steering wheel. The 1974 Laguna S-3 had replaced the discontinued "SS" as the performance option on the Chevelle. Production totaled 15,792 cars, with prices starting at $3,723 - and plenty of options to send the bottom line past $5,000. Engine offerings included a standard 145 horsepower (108 kW) 350 two-barrel V8, with optional powerplants including a 150 horsepower (110 kW) 400 two-barrel V8, 175 horsepower (130 kW) 400 four-barrel V8 and 235 horsepower (175 kW) 454 four-barrel V8, except in California where a 155 horsepower (116 kW) 350 four-barrel V8 was standard and the 400 and 454 engines were optional. Turbo Hydra-matic transmission was standard with a four-speed manual available only with the 454 engine. Horsepower was seemingly lower due to the way it was calculated as 'net' starting in 1972 as opposed to 'gross' horsepower ratings of 1971 and prior years.

The 1975 Laguna S-3 was introduced mid-year in January 1975. This time, it had a slanted, urethane-covered aero-style nose designed for NASCAR (which later resurfaced again in 1983 with the Monte Carlo SS) and louvered opera windows. The Colonnade designation was dropped. The vinyl half-roof, swiveling Strato-bucket front seats with center console, as well as the four-spoke sport steering were no longer standard S-3 equipment, and were made optional in mid-1974 to reduce the car's base price. The 454 engine option was available for the first half of the model year in the Chevelle and thus the 1975 Laguna had the 400 as the top engine. The 49-states' engine line-up was - the standard 145-horsepower 350 two-barrel V8, the optional 175-horsepower 400 four-barrel V8, and the 215-horsepower 454 four-barrel V8. In California, a 155-horsepower 350 four-barrel V8 was standard and the 180-horsepower 400 four-barrel V8 was the only engine option. All 1975 models included the newly introduced catalytic converter. The Turbo Hydra-matic three-speed automatic was the only transmission offered as manual transmissions were discontinued. Options included an Econominder gauge package, during the gasoline shortage of the mid-seventies.

In its third and final year, the 1976 Laguna Type S-3 again featured a sloped, body-color urethane front end and quarter-window louvers, but with new rear styling and horizontal taillights shared with other Chevelles. Lagunas shared their round-gauge instrument panel with the personal-luxury Monte Carlo; Malibu models made do with a more conventional dashboard and a linear-readout speedometer. The standard engine was a new 140-horsepower 305 two-barrel V8. Optional engines included the 145-horsepower 350 two-barrel V8 and 175-horsepower 400 four-barrel V8. Aero styling had helped make the Laguna popular with NASCAR drivers. The Laguna S3 was outsold by the Malibu Classic coupe and the Monte Carlo. Production of the Laguna edged up to 9,100 cars as the base price went to $4,621.

== NASCAR ==
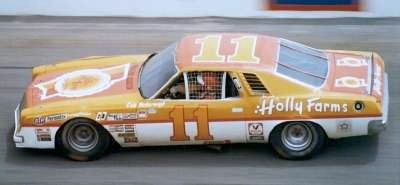
Cale Yarborough's No. 11 Chevelle Laguna

The third generation Chevelle was an extensively used body style in NASCAR competition from 1973 to 1977. The Chevelle Laguna S-3 in particular was extremely successful. Its sloped nose, small rear quarter windows and "fastback-style" rear glass gave it an aero advantage over other GM body styles at NASCAR's fastest tracks. Junior Johnson's team, with driver Cale Yarborough, won 34 races and earned the first two of three consecutive Winston Cup championships. Considered a limited edition "aero" model by NASCAR, the Laguna S-3 was made ineligible for competition following the 1977 season. The Laguna was so fast that NASCAR required the cars be fitted with 'restrictor plates' to effectively slow them down when no other cars had this requirement.

Motor Trend said in 1973: "While neither Chevrolet or Pontiac are back in racing, the new crop intermediates out of GM's styling studios are curiously aerodynamic. They are also curiously competing on the NASCAR circuit tracks, and selling as fast as they can be hauled to the dealerships."

=== Highlights ===
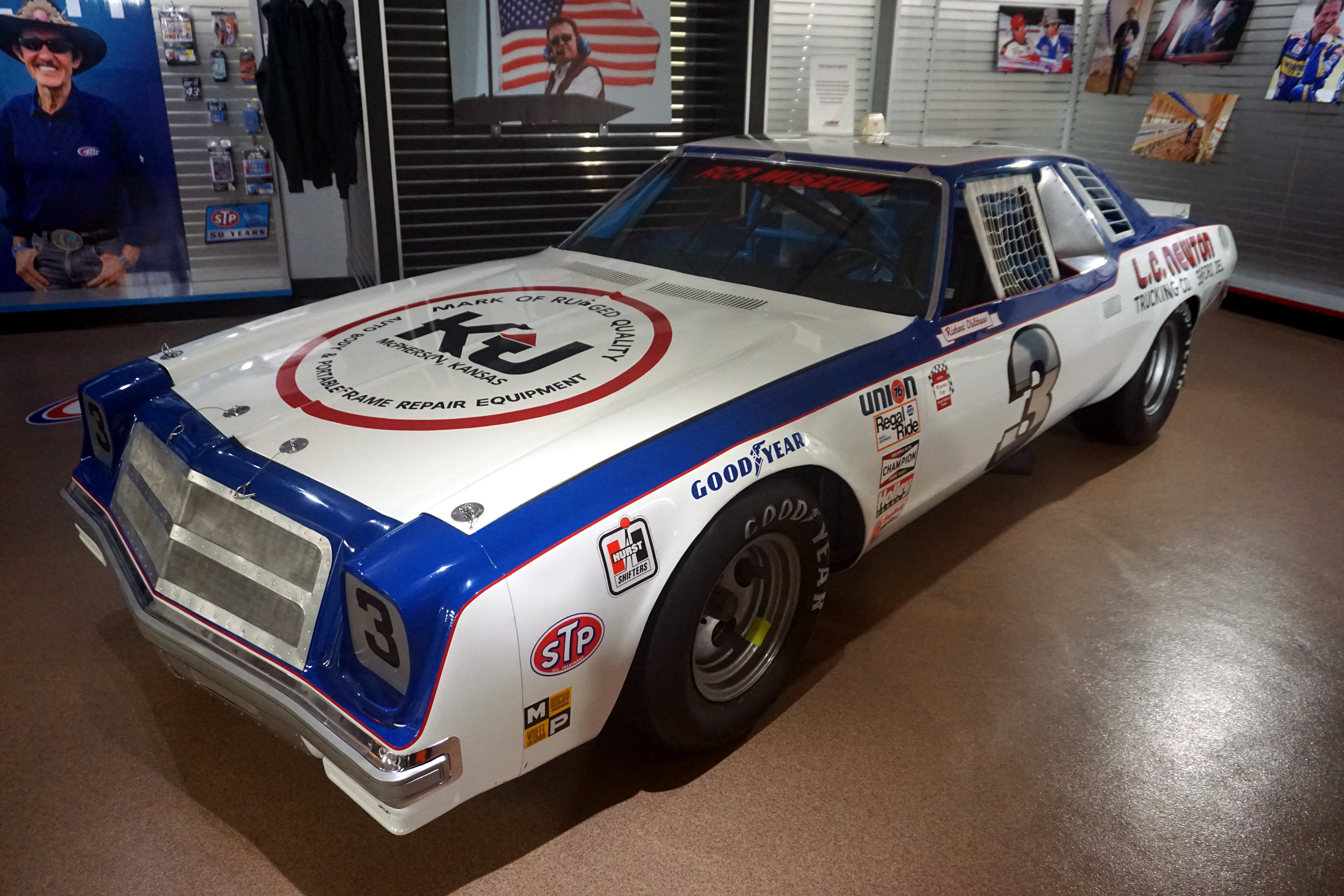
Richard Childress's 1976 No. 3 Kansas Jack Chevrolet Chevelle Laguna

Third generation Chevelle NASCAR Winston Cup highlights:

March 25, 1973: Southeastern 500-Cale Yarborough, back in NASCAR's fold after a two-year exile in USAC Indy Cars, drives Junior Johnson's No. 11 Chevrolet Chevelle to an overwhelming victory in the Southeastern 500 at Bristol. Yarborough leads all 500 laps.

July 8, 1973: Volunteer 500-Points leader Benny Parsons drives his unsponsored Chevelle to an impressive win in the Volunteer 500 at Bristol International Speedway. Parsons finishes seven laps ahead of runner-up L.D. Ottinger.

September 23, 1973: Wilkes 400-Bobby Allison runs down Richard Petty on the final lap to win the Wilkes 400 at North Wilkesboro Speedway. It was Allison's second win of the season in his No. 12 Chevelle.

October 21, 1973: American 500-Benny Parsons pits for repairs after an early crash. The help of several teams allow him to get back into the race and finish 28th. Parsons and his Chevelle hold on to win the NASCAR Winston Cup Grand National championship. Parsons took the points lead with a third-place finish at Talladega Speedway in early May and never gave up the lead. He held off a late rally by Cale Yarborough to win by only 67.15 points.

July 14, 1974: Volunteer 500-Cale Yarborough muscles his way around Buddy Baker on the final lap and squeezes out a narrow win in Bristol's Volunteer 500. It is the seventh win of the season for Yarborough and his No. 11 Chevelle.

February 16, 1975: Daytona 500-Benny Parsons takes the lead three laps from the finish and wins the Daytona 500 when leader David Pearson spins on the backstretch. Parsons Chevelle comes from the 32nd starting position to claim the upset win and the biggest victory of his career.

May 10, 1975: Music City USA 420-Darrell Waltrip racks up his first career NASCAR Winston Cup Grand National victory in his No. 17 Laguna with a two-lap triumph in the Music City USA 420 at his hometown Nashville Speedway. Benny Parsons finishes second in his Chevelle.

August 1976: Cale Yarborough drives his No. 11 Junior Johnson/Holly Farms Chevelle to the 1976 NASCAR Winston Cup Grand National championship. Yarborough won nine races along the way to the first of three consecutive titles. He finished last in the Daytona 500, but assumed command of the points chase in August. Yarborough beat Richard Petty by 195 points.

February 20, 1977: Daytona 500-Cale Yarborough's Chevelle pulls away from Benny Parsons' Chevelle in the final laps to win his second Daytona 500. Yarborough was running at the finish in all 30 NASCAR Winston Cup races as he dominated the 1977 season to wrap up his second consecutive title. Yarborough won nine races in 30 starts in his No. 11 Chevelle and finished 386 points ahead of runner-up Richard Petty.

=== Wins ===

Bobby Allison's No. 12 Chevelle Laguna

Third generation Chevelle NASCAR Winston Cup victories:

Date Track Race Winner Car Speed (73-77 seasons)

- 3/25/73 Bristol, TN Cale Yarborough Chevrolet 88.952
- 5/12/73 Nashville, TN Cale Yarborough Chevrolet 98.419
- 6/17/73 Riverside, CA Bobby Allison Chevrolet 100.215
- 7/08/73 Bristol, TN Benny Parsons Chevrolet 91.342
- 9/03/73 Darlington, SC Cale Yarborough Chevrolet 134.033
- 9/23/73 North Wilkesboro, NC Bobby Allison Chevrolet 95.130
- 10/07/73 Charlotte, NC Cale Yarborough Chevrolet 145.240
- 1/20/74 Riverside, CA Cale Yarborough Chevrolet 101.140
- 2/24/74 Richmond, VA Bobby Allison Chevrolet 80.095
- 3/17/74 Bristol, TN Cale Yarborough Chevrolet 64.533
- 3/24/74 Atlanta, GA Cale Yarborough Chevrolet 136.910
- 4/28/74 Martinsville, VA Cale Yarborough Chevrolet 70.427
- 5/19/74 Dover, DE Cale Yarborough Chevrolet 115.057
- 6/09/74 Riverside, CA Cale Yarborough Chevrolet 102.489
- 7/14/74 Bristol, TN Cale Yarborough Chevrolet 75.430
- 7/20/74 Nashville, TN Cale Yarborough Chevrolet 76.368
- 9/02/74 Darlington, SC Cale Yarborough Chevrolet 111.075
- 9/22/74 North Wilkesboro, NC Cale Yarborough Chevrolet 80.782
- 9/29/74 Martinsville, VA Earl Ross Chevrolet 66.232
- 2/16/75 Daytona Beach, FL Benny Parsons Chevrolet 153.649
- 3/02/75 Rockingham, NC Cale Yarborough Chevrolet 117.588
- 5/10/75 Nashville, TN Darrell Waltrip Chevrolet 94.107
- 7/20/75 Nashville, TN Cale Yarborough Chevrolet 89.792
- 10/12/75 Richmond, VA Darrell Waltrip Chevrolet 81.886
- 10/19/75 Rockingham, NC Cale Yarborough Chevrolet 120.129
- 3/14/76 Bristol, TN Cale Yarborough Chevrolet 87.377
- 4/04/76 North Wilkesboro, NC Cale Yarborough Chevrolet 96.858
- 4/25/76 Martinsville, VA Darrell Waltrip Chevrolet 71.759
- 5/08/76 Nashville, TN Cale Yarborough Chevrolet 84.512
- 5/16/76 Dover, DE Benny Parsons Chevrolet 115.436
- 7/04/76 Daytona Beach, FL Cale Yarborough Chevrolet 160.966
- 7/17/76 Nashville, TN Benny Parsons Chevrolet 86.908
- 8/02/76 Bristol, TN Cale Yarborough Chevrolet 99.175
- 9/12/76 Richmond, VA Cale Yarborough Chevrolet 77.993
- 9/19/76 Dover, DE Cale Yarborough Chevrolet 115.740
- 9/26/76 Martinsville, VA Cale Yarborough Chevrolet 75.370
- 10/03/76 North Wilkesboro, NC Cale Yarborough Chevrolet 96.380
- 10/10/76 Charlotte, NC Donnie Allison Chevrolet 141.226
- 2/20/77 Daytona Beach, FL Cale Yarborough Chevrolet 153.218
- 2/27/77 Richmond, VA Cale Yarborough Chevrolet 73.084
- 3/27/77 North Wilkesboro, NC Cale Yarborough Chevrolet 88.950
- 4/17/77 Bristol, TN Cale Yarborough Chevrolet 100.989
- 4/24/77 Martinsville, VA Cale Yarborough Chevrolet 77.405
- 5/07/77 Nashville, TN Benny Parsons Chevrolet 87.490
- 5/15/77 Dover, DE Cale Yarborough Chevrolet 123.327
- 6/19/77 Brooklyn, MI Cale Yarborough Chevrolet 135.033
- 7/31/77 Pocono, PA Benny Parsons Chevrolet 128.379
- 8/07/77 Talladega, AL Donnie Allison Chevrolet 162.524
- 8/28/77 Bristol, TN Cale Yarborough Chevrolet 79.726
- 9/18/77 Dover, DE Benny Parsons Chevrolet 114.708
- 9/25/77 Martinsville, VA Cale Yarborough Chevrolet 73.447
- 10/09/77 Charlotte, NC Benny Parsons Chevrolet 142.780
- 10/23/77 Rockingham, NC Donnie Allison Chevrolet 113.584

== See also ==
- GM A platform (RWD)
- Mid-size car: The United States
