= Pontiac Grand Am =

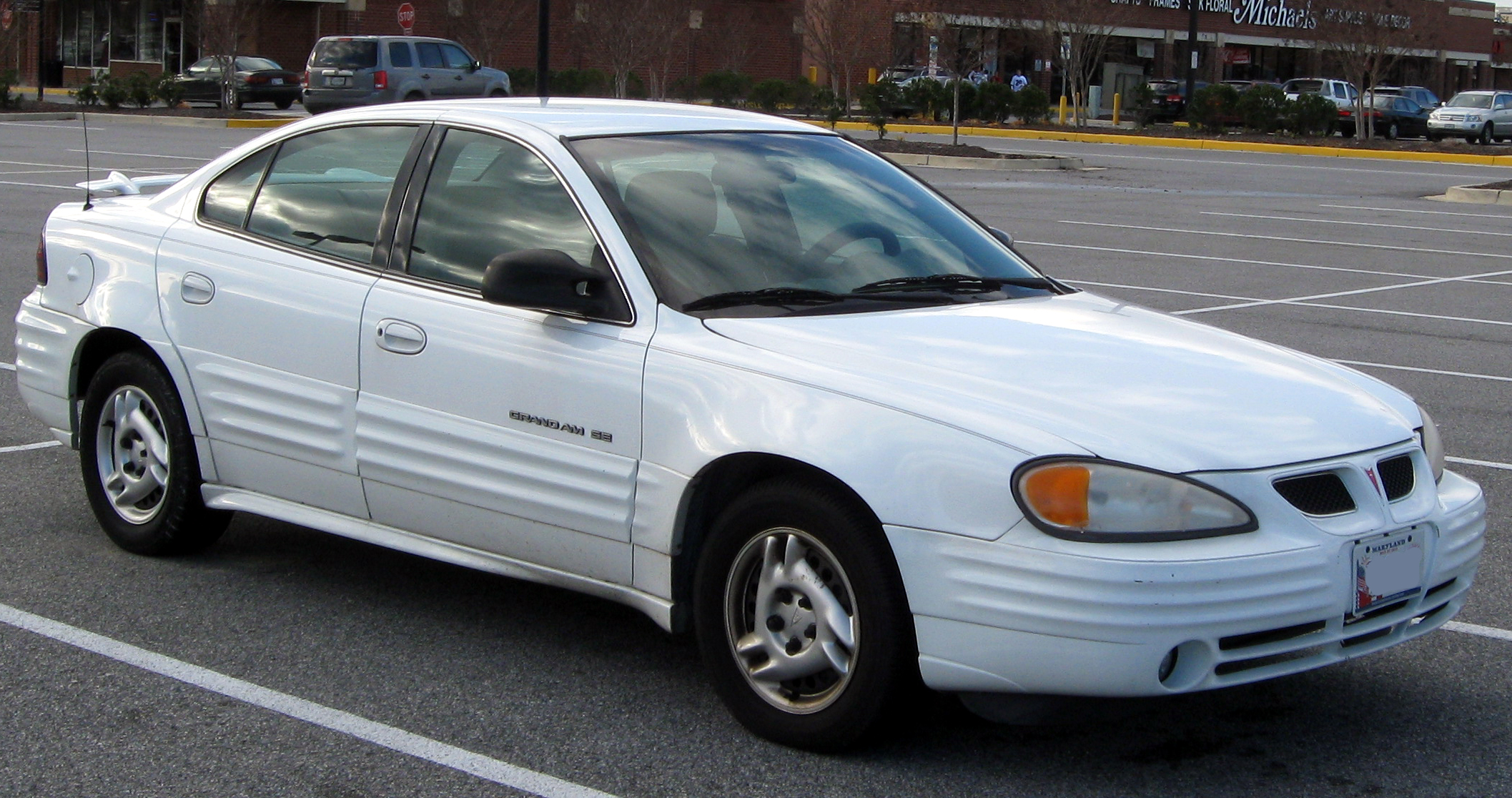

Overview
- Manufacturer: Pontiac (General Motors)
- Production: 1973–1975; 1977–1980; 1984–2005

Body and chassis
- Body style: 2-door fastback coupe; 2-door notchback coupe; 4-door fastback sedan; 4-door notchback sedan

Chronology
- Predecessor: Pontiac LeMans (for 1973); Pontiac Phoenix (for 1985); Pontiac Tempest (for 1992 - Canada)
- Successor: Pontiac G6 (2005)

The Pontiac Grand Am is a car model that the Pontiac division of General Motors produced in various years between 1973 and 2005. The first and second generations were RWD mid-size cars built on the LeMans GM A platform. The Grand Am name was reused for a FWD compact car from 1985 until the nameplate was discontinued in 2005.

The platform began development intended to be the next generation GTO, but the muscle car era was drawing to a close. Pontiac decided to make this model America's answer to European luxury sports sedans. The Grand Am name was derived from two other Pontiacs; "Grand" signifying Grand Prix luxury, and "Am" for Trans Am performance.

The first generation Grand Am featured innovations that included a deformable urethane nose (an evolution of the "Endura" bumper pioneered on the 1968 GTO) and was one of only three GM cars (Olds Cutlass Salon, Chevy Monte Carlo S) to debut radial-ply tires (RTS - Radial Tuned Suspension) as standard equipment. The intermediate sized Grand Am was canceled in 1980 when it was replaced by the Pontiac 6000.

A compact-sized Grand Am, based on the GM N-platform, was released in 1985, replacing the Pontiac Phoenix. It became Pontiac's best selling car and was later replaced by the Pontiac G6, so named as it was intended to be the 6th generation of the Grand Am.

All 1973 through 1975 Grand Ams were built in Pontiac, Michigan at Pontiac's main assembly plant. The 1978-1980 Grand Ams were built in Pontiac, Michigan at Pontiac's main assembly plant and in Atlanta, Georgia at GMAD Lakewood. All Grand Ams between 1985 and 2005 were built in Lansing, Michigan at the Lansing Car Assembly.

== First generation (1973–1975) ==
First generation
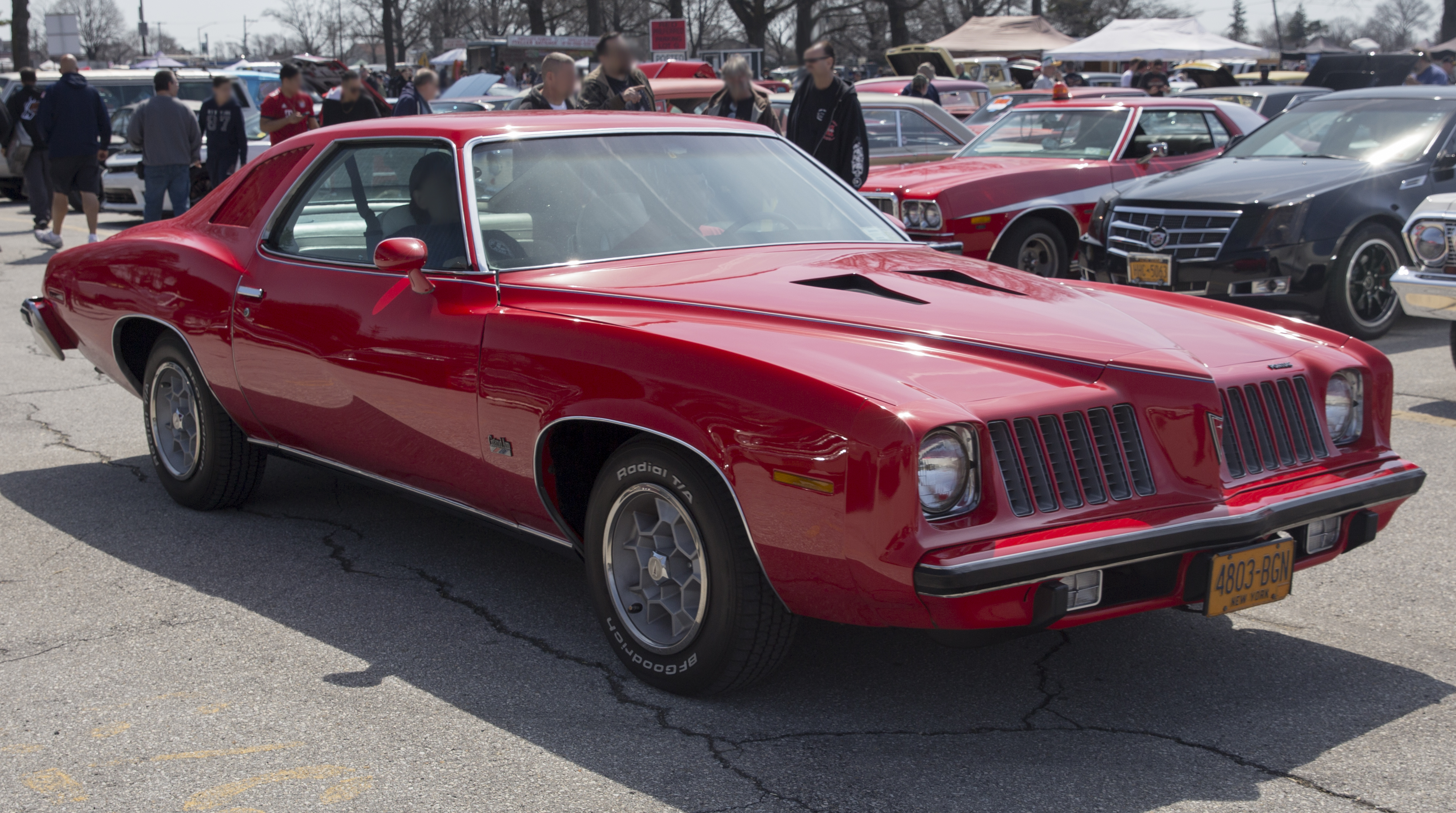
- 1974 Pontiac Grand Am two-door Hardtop

Overview
- Production: 1972–1975
- Model years: 1973–1975
- Assembly: United States: Pontiac, Michigan

Body and chassis
- Class: Mid-size
- Body style: 2-door hardtop coupe 4-door hardtop sedan
- Layout: FR layout
- Platform: GM A platform (RWD) (A-body)
- Related: Buick Century Gran Sport; Oldsmobile 442; Chevrolet Chevelle Laguna

Powertrain
- Engine: 400 cu in (6.6 L) Pontiac V8; 455 cu in (7.5 L) Pontiac V8
- Transmission: TH400 automatic or 4-speed manual

Dimensions
- Wheelbase: 112.0 in (284 cm) (2-door); 116.0 in (295 cm) (4-door)
- Length: 208.6 in (530 cm) (2-door); 212.6 in (540 cm) (4-door)
- Width: 77.7 in (197 cm)

Chronology
- Successor: Pontiac Can Am

The history of Grand Am begins with Pontiac executives noting incursion into the US market by Mercedes, BMW, Toyota and Nissan. Notably, the American sports car was usually without luxury features, and the luxury car without sport features. Foreign makes mixed these features, that introducing to the market luxury performance coupes and sedans that had balanced handling along with powerful engines. Pontiac hybridized the Grand Prix with the Trans Am to create the Grand Am, a naming tactic shared with the luxury Pontiac Grand Ville. Built on the A-body platform shared with the Pontiac LeMans, the intended GTO body was re-badged and fitted with the top-level Grand Prix interior, and using the larger engine from the Grand Prix, Bonneville and Grand Ville.

The original Grand Am was introduced in the fall of 1972 as a 1973 model. It was based on the GM A platform (A-body) along with other cars such as the Chevrolet Chevelle Laguna, Oldsmobile Cutlass Supreme, and the Buick Century Gran Sport. The GM A-body platform had major design revisions in 1973, including the elimination of pillarless hardtops due to proposed Federal rollover standards, but with frameless windows similar to that of a hardtop. No convertibles were produced due to the proposed standards, which were not enacted. In addition to Federal emissions regulations, new safety standards required a 5 mph (8.0 km/h) impact-resistant front bumper and a 2.5 mph (4.0 km/h) impact-resistant rear bumper, which increased to 5 mph (8.0 km/h) for 1974.

The 1973 oil crisis caused a dichotomy for buyers: total luxury or total economy. Since Grand Am was an "in-between", its sales declined and the model was discontinued in 1975.

=== 1973 ===
The Grand Am, a name coined by Pontiac by combining the names of two other cars in its lineup – "Grand" from the luxurious "Grand Prix" and "Am" from the sporting "Trans Am" – was positioned as America's answer to European luxury/sport sedans and available as a four-door Colonnade sedan or a two-door Colonnade coupe. A total of 43,136 Grand Ams were built during the first year of production.

The Grand Am could be had with a standard 2-bbl 400 cu in (6.6 L) V8 engine with single exhaust producing 170 hp (127 kW; 172 PS), an optional 4-bbl version of this engine with single exhaust producing 200 hp (149 kW; 203 PS) that was only available with a 4-speed manual transmission, an optional 4-bbl version of this engine with dual exhaust producing 230 hp (172 kW; 233 PS), or an optional 4-bbl 455 cu in (7.5 L) with dual exhaust 250 hp (186 kW; 253 PS). The engine displacement, expressed in liters, was displayed on the bootlid in an effort to accentuate the car's supposedly European character.

All engines were available with a Turbo-hydramatic 400 automatic transmission as standard equipment. A 4-speed manual transmission was available with the 400/4-bbl engine in 1973 and 1974, but this was not popular.

The 1973 Pontiac Grand Am style had a unique flexible urethane front fascia center nose (known as the 'Endura' nose) that was squeezable and could return to its original shape following a minor collision along with the new energy-absorbing bumpers, a total of six grille openings with vertical bars, round front turn signals with a cross-hair design, horizontal rear taillights, and chrome rear bumper. Additionally, Grand Ams featured a Radial Tuned Suspension (RTS) as standard equipment that included radial-ply tires, Pliacell shock absorbers, and front and rear sway bars. The springs were advertised as being computer selected. The Grand Am was one of only three GM cars to have standard radial tires and appropriate suspension tuning in 1973, with the others being the Oldsmobile Cutlass Salon and Chevrolet Monte Carlo S.

The Grand Am included Strato bucket seats upholstered in Naugahyde vinyl or corduroy cloth featuring manual recliners and adjustable lumbar supports - both features common on European-style sports/luxury sedans, but unusual for American cars of that time. Also included were an instrument panel from the Pontiac Grand Prix featuring a Rally gauge cluster with fuel, oil, water and volt gauges (a tachometer or fuel economy gauge was optional, and on cars so equipped, the clock was moved to a space on the lower instrument panel under the radio), three-spoke padded steering wheel with brushed-stainless spokes, and Genuine Crossfire African Mahogany trim on the dash facing, radio and clock surrounds, as well as the center console between the front seats. Grand Ams also were among the first U.S.-built cars with a turn-signal mounted headlight dimmer switch that had been common on imported cars for decades. Other standard equipment included concealed windshield wipers, a 1.12 in (28 mm) front stabilizer bar, and an in-the-windshield radio antenna. Upscale options included air conditioning, tinted glass, power windows-locks-seat, rear defogger, various sound systems, and tilt-steering-wheel. AM/FM stereo with a tape player was optional. The listed retail price for the 2-door coupe was US$4,264 ($30,925 in 2025 dollars), listing it above the Firebird Trans Am.

Pontiac also produced a single 1973 Grand Am station wagon as a feasibility study. This was a LeMans wagon converted to a Grand Am. A functional ram-air induction system was developed for the Pontiac A-bodies utilizing twin NACA openings in the hood, but the option was dropped due to the inability to pass federally mandated drive-by noise standards. A few functional Ram Air systems were sold over the counter. The twin-scoop NACA hood was an option for any Pontiac A-body for all three years, but was non-functional.

In a Popular Mechanics Owners survey, 67% rated the build quality as good to excellent and 79% liked the handling. However, 22.1% disliked the fuel economy.

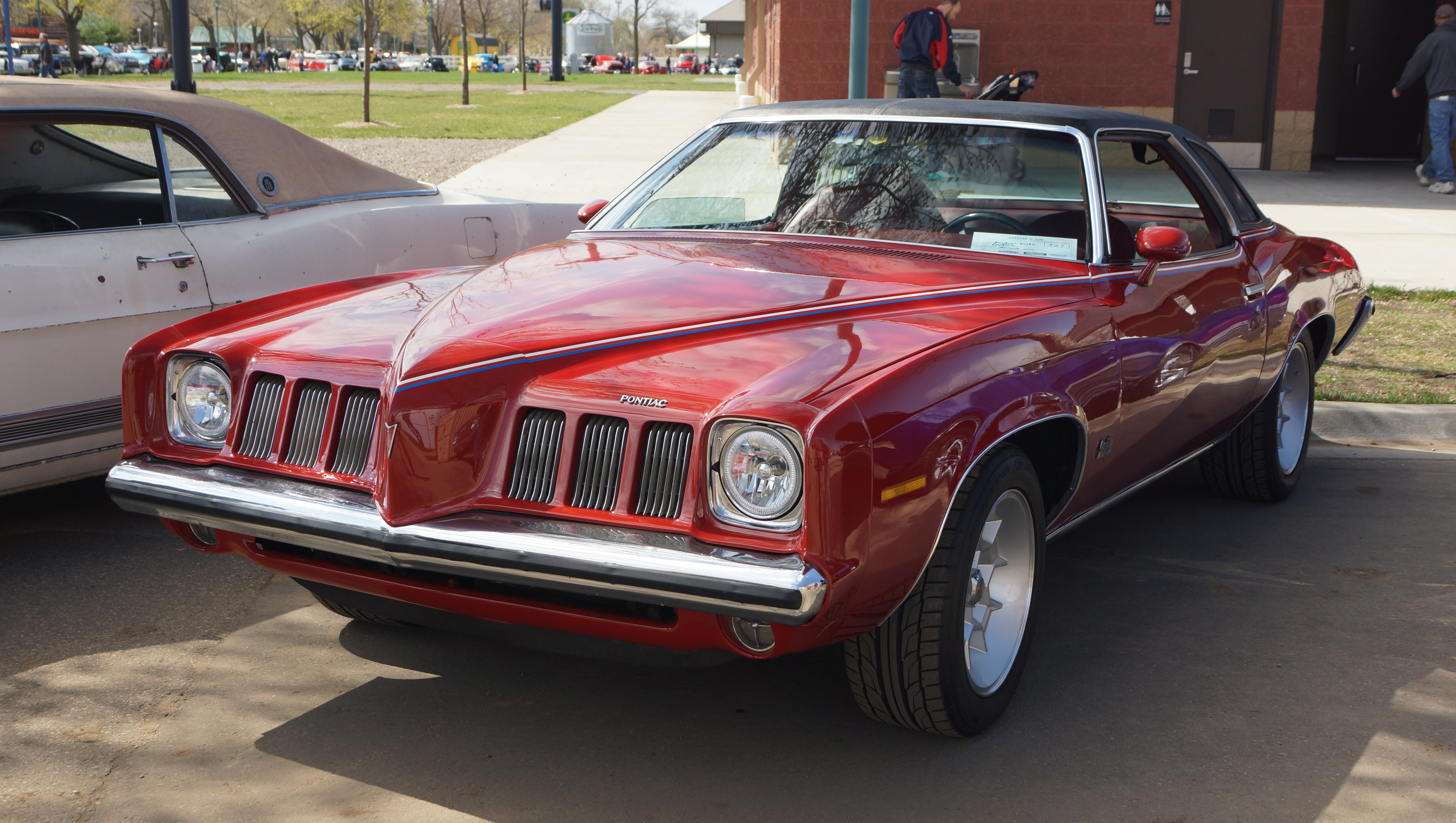
1973 Grand Am two-door coupe

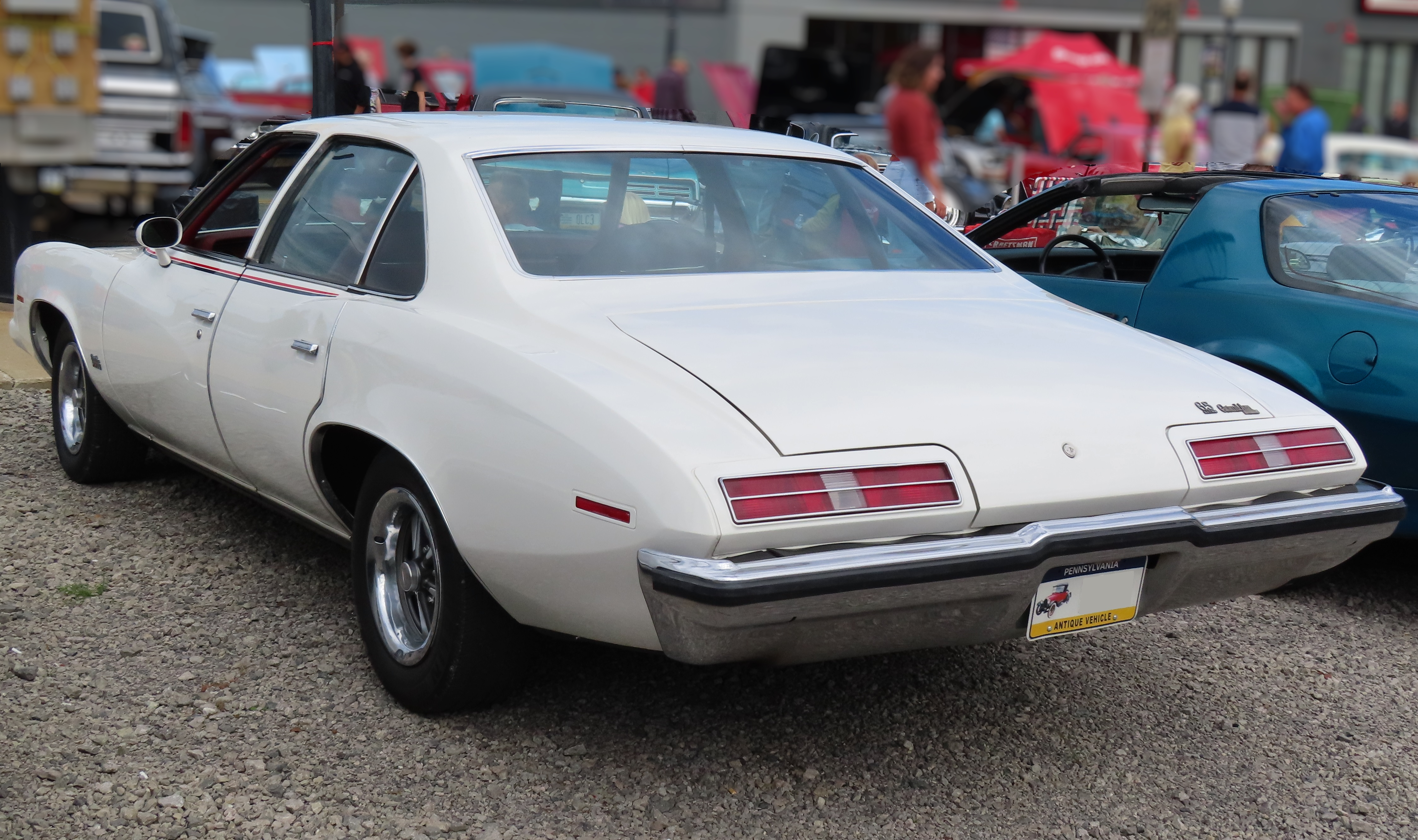
1973 Grand Am four-door sedan

=== 1974 ===
Described as "The mid-sized Pontiac with Foreign Intrigue ... American Ingenuity" on the front cover of the four-page 1974 Grand Am brochure that featured a green four-door sedan, only minor styling changes highlighted this year's model including a redesigned nose and grille with 12 openings with horizontal bars. The 1974 Grand Am's rear-end styling was redesigned for the new 5 mph crash standards and had vertical rear taillights with relocated license plate and fuel filler above the bumper. Engine and transmission offerings were the same as 1973, but four-speed manual transmissions were no longer offered in California, where only the Turbo Hydra-matic automatic was available. Inside, the genuine African crossfire mahogany trim on the instrument panel was replaced by a simulated material due to delamination problems on the 1973 models but the real wood was continued on the center console, optional console clock, and radio bezel.

Engine choices were a 400 cu in (6.6 L) 2-barrel with single exhaust producing 175 hp (130 kW; 177 PS), a dual exhaust version of the same making 190 hp (142 kW; 193 PS), a 4-barrel 400-ci V8 with dual exhaust rated at 225 hp (168 kW; 228 PS), and a 455 cubic inch 4-barrel with dual exhaust producing 250 hp (186 kW; 253 PS). All four options were available with automatic transmission, while only the 400 4-barrel was also available with manual transmission.

Sales were down more than 50 percent due to the 1973 oil crisis, and while the recession continued, prices increased for all 1974 model cars. Only 17,083 Grand Ams were built in 1974.

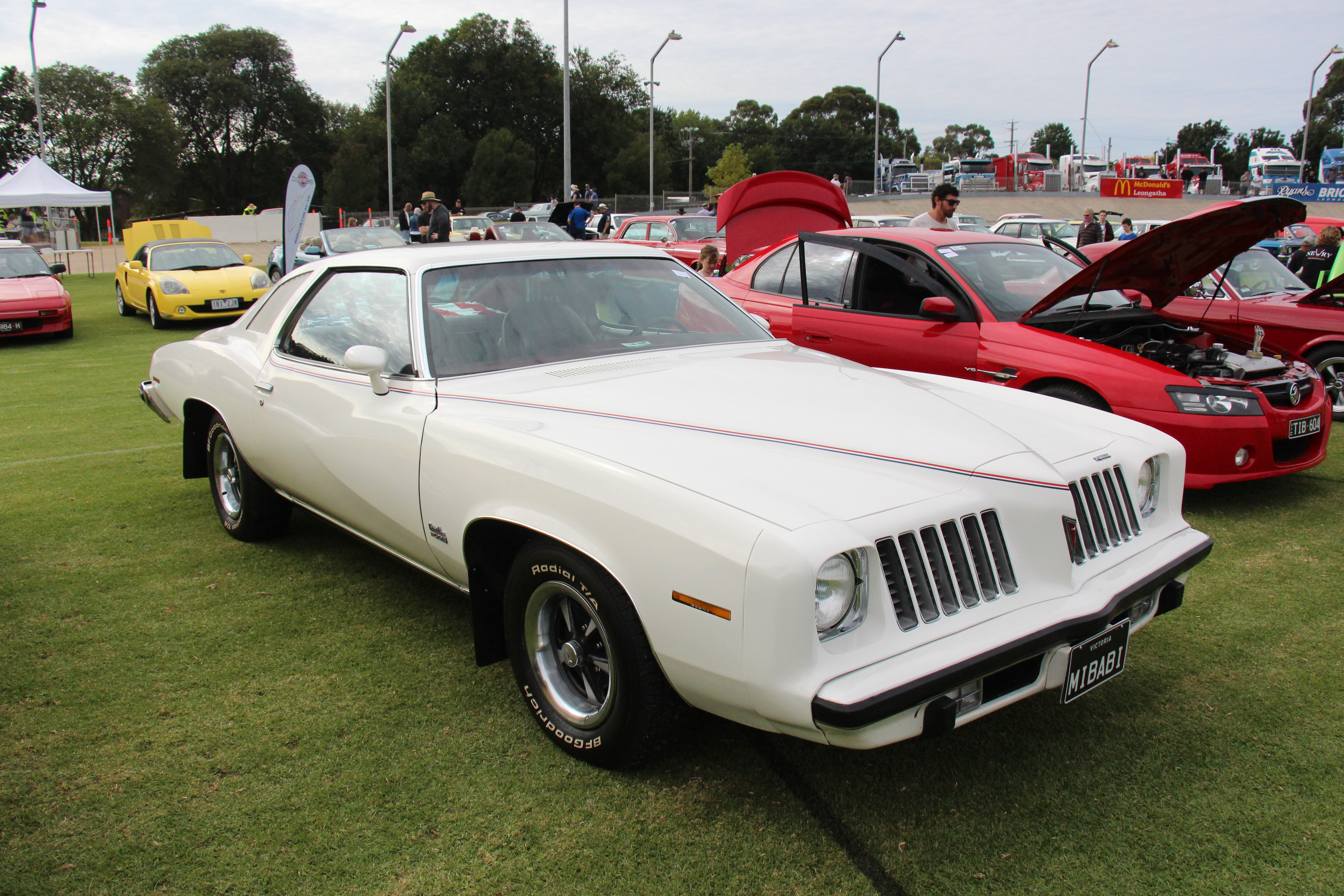
1974 Grand Am two-door hardtop

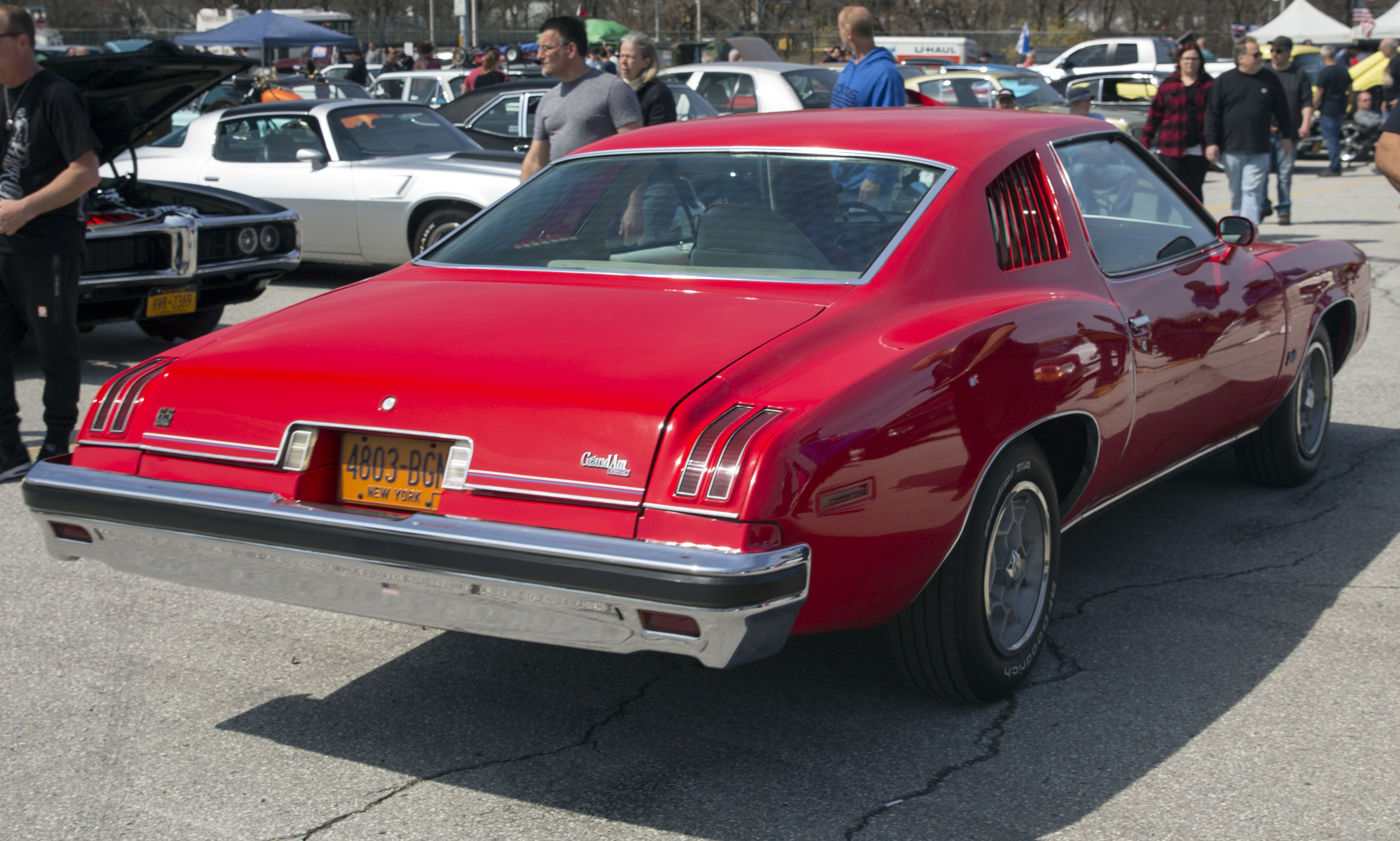
1974 Grand Am two-door hardtop, rear

=== 1975 ===
The 1975 Grand Am looked the same as the 1974 model, but had vertical front grille bars, a body-colored rear bumper, and a catalytic converter single-exhaust, which mandated the use of unleaded fuel, along with GM's High Energy Ignition and other items promoted as part of Pontiac's maximum mileage system. In addition to the standard roofline with louvered rear side windows, Grand Am coupes with the optional vinyl roof could be ordered with a full triangular rear side window or a vertical opera window similar to that found on the Grand Prix.

Inside, the Strato bucket seats received revised vertical trim patterns, the adjustable lumbar support controls were dropped, and only the passenger seat had a recliner, a "safety practice" which would continue at GM for a decade. New this year as a no-cost option was a 60/40 bench seat with a center armrest.

Engines were also detuned to meet the 1975 emission regulations with the compression ratio dropping to a new low of 7.6 to 1 on some engines. Standard was the 170 hp (127 kW; 172 PS) 400 cu in (6.6 L) V8 with two-barrel carburetor, optional were a 185 hp (138 kW; 188 PS) 400, or a 200 hp (149 kW; 203 PS) 455 cu in (7.5 L) - both with four-barrel carburetors. Turbo Hydra-matic was standard equipment and the only transmission offered this year. Performance from 0-60 was 7.7 seconds.

A total of 10,679 Grand Ams were built in 1975 and the series was dropped after this year due to declining sales and rising gas prices as a result of the 1973 oil crisis. Another factor leading to the Grand Am's cancellation were plans for all 1976 Pontiac A-body cars receiving the newly approved rectangular headlights, which would necessitate a complete redesign of the Grand Am's Endura nose and Pontiac officials decided that the expense of such a redesign could not be justified based on low production numbers. The basic GM A-body design remained until 1977.

=== Production ===
1973-1975 Pontiac Grand Am Production Figures
	Engine:	L65 400 2-bbl	L78 400 4-bbl	L78 400 4-bbl	L75 455 4-bbl	LS2 SD-455	
Year	Transmission*:	M40	M20	M40	M40	M40	Total
1973	2-door Coupe	19,538	971	10,455	3,481	1	34,446
1973	4-door Sedan	5,727	87	2,151	726	0	8,691
1973	Total	25,265	1,058	12,606	4,207	1	43,137
1974	2-door Coupe	8,031	310	4,187	1,433	0	13,961
1974	4-door Sedan	1,992	32	813	285	0	3,122
1974	Total	10,023	342	5,000	1,718	0	17,083
1975	2-door Coupe	5,276	0	2,613	897	0	8,786
1975	4-door Sedan	1,259	0	490	144	0	1,893
1975	Total	6,535	0	3,103	1,041	0	10,679

=== Transmissions ===
- M40 = TH400 3spd automatic
- M20 4-speed manual not available in California
- Model year 1973–1974.5, M20 = Muncie 4spd
- 2nd half of 1974, M20 = BW Super T10 4spd

=== Engines ===
- 1973–1975 L65 400 cu in (6.6 L) V8 with 2-barrel carburetor (standard engine, others were optional)
- 1973–1975 L78 400 cu in (6.6 L) V8 with 4-barrel carburetor
- 1973–1975 L75 455 cu in (7.5 L) V8 with 4-barrel carburetor

Notes:

- A SD-455 equipped engineering prototype Grand Am was built and tested, but was later dismantled and destroyed.
- 1973 engines may have point or unitized ignition.
- 1974 engines may have point or unitized ignition or starting around May 1, 1974, HEI ignition.
- 1975 engines have HEI ignition.
- 1975 was the first year for the catalytic converter.

== Second generation (1978–1980) ==
Second generation
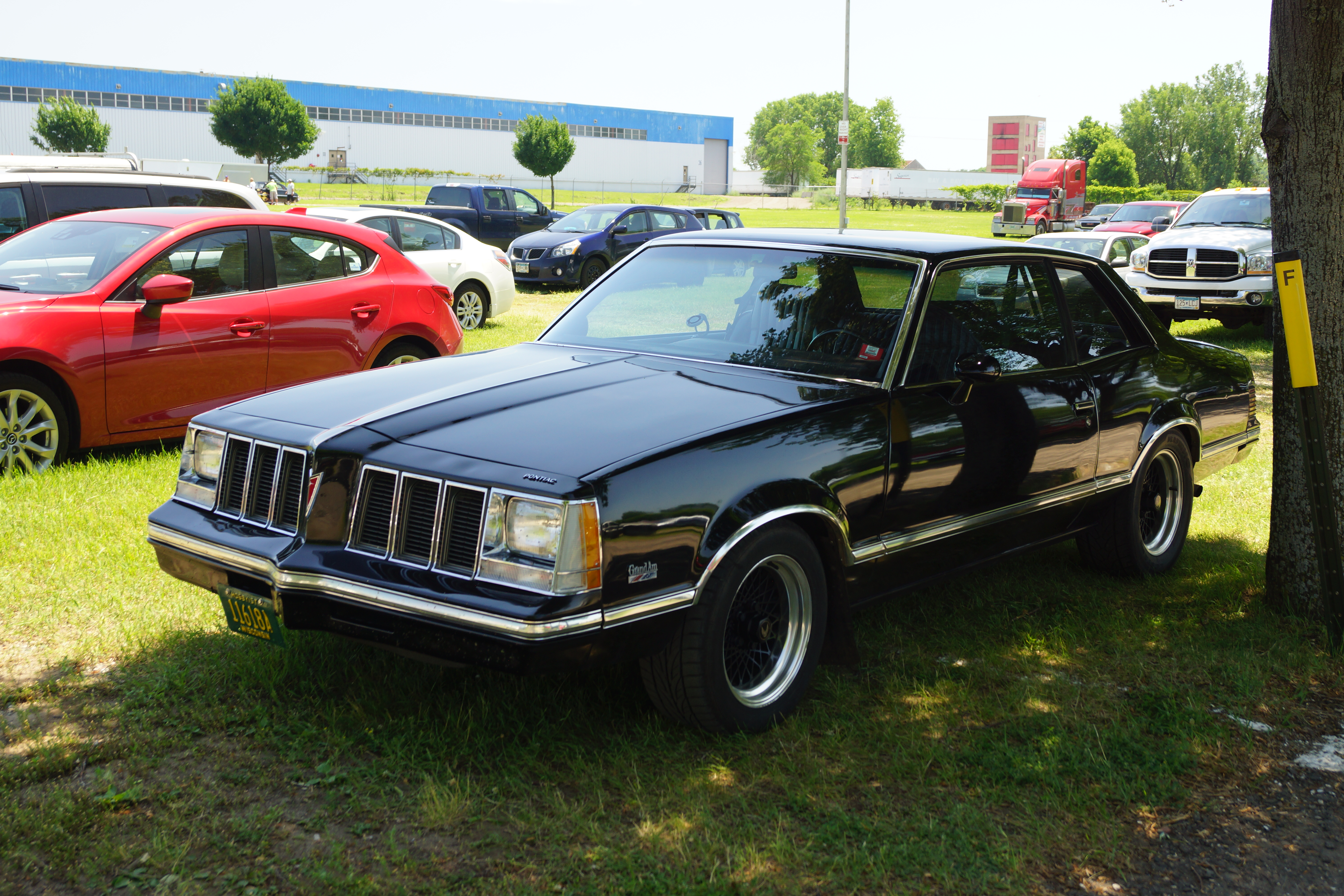
- 1980 Pontiac Grand Am coupe

Overview
- Production: 1977–1980
- Model years: 1978–1980
- Assembly: United States: Pontiac, Michigan

Body and chassis
- Class: Mid-size
- Layout: FR layout
- Platform: A-body
- Related: Buick Century; Buick Regal; Oldsmobile Cutlass Supreme; Pontiac Grand Prix; Pontiac LeMans; Chevrolet El Camino; Chevrolet Malibu; Chevrolet Monte Carlo

Powertrain
- Engine: 231 cu in (3.8 L) Buick 2-bbl. V6; 301 cu in (4.9 L) Pontiac V8; 305 cu in (5.0 L) Chevrolet V8
- Transmission: automatic 3-speed manual 4-speed manual

Dimensions
- Wheelbase: 108.1 in (2,746 mm)
- Length: 198.6 in (5,044 mm)
- Width: 72.4 in (1,839 mm)

Chronology
- Predecessor: Pontiac Can Am

=== 1978 ===
For 1978 the Grand Am nameplate returned on a downsized model using the Grand Prix's G platform. It was offered in both two- and four-door models featuring a vertical bar grille and other trimmings to differentiate it from the LeMans, upon which it was based. Like the 1973–1975 models, this generation of Grand Ams also featured standard radial tires plus an upgraded Radial Tuned Suspension with front and rear sway bars. Interiors were similar to the Grand LeMans with either a standard notchback bench seat, optional 60/40 bench or Strato bucket seats with console and recliner on passenger side, an optional tachometer, and a choice of either cloth or "Morrokide" vinyl upholstery.

Standard equipment included power steering, power front disc brakes, Turbo Hydra-matic transmission, full instrumentation and Pontiac's 301 cu in (4.9 L) V8 engine with two-barrel carburetor producing 140 hp (104 kW; 142 PS). Optional was a 4-bbl 155 hp (116 kW; 157 PS) version, along with numerous extra cost items such as snowflake wheels, whitewall or white-lettered tires, power windows and seats, tilt steering wheel, sunroof, and cruise control.

In California, where more stringent emission regulations made Pontiac V8 engines unavailable since 1977, Chevrolet V8 engines were substituted including a standard 135 hp (101 kW; 137 PS) 305 cu in (5.0 L) V8 with two-barrel carburetor or optional four-barrel version with 145 hp (108 kW; 147 PS).

=== 1979 ===
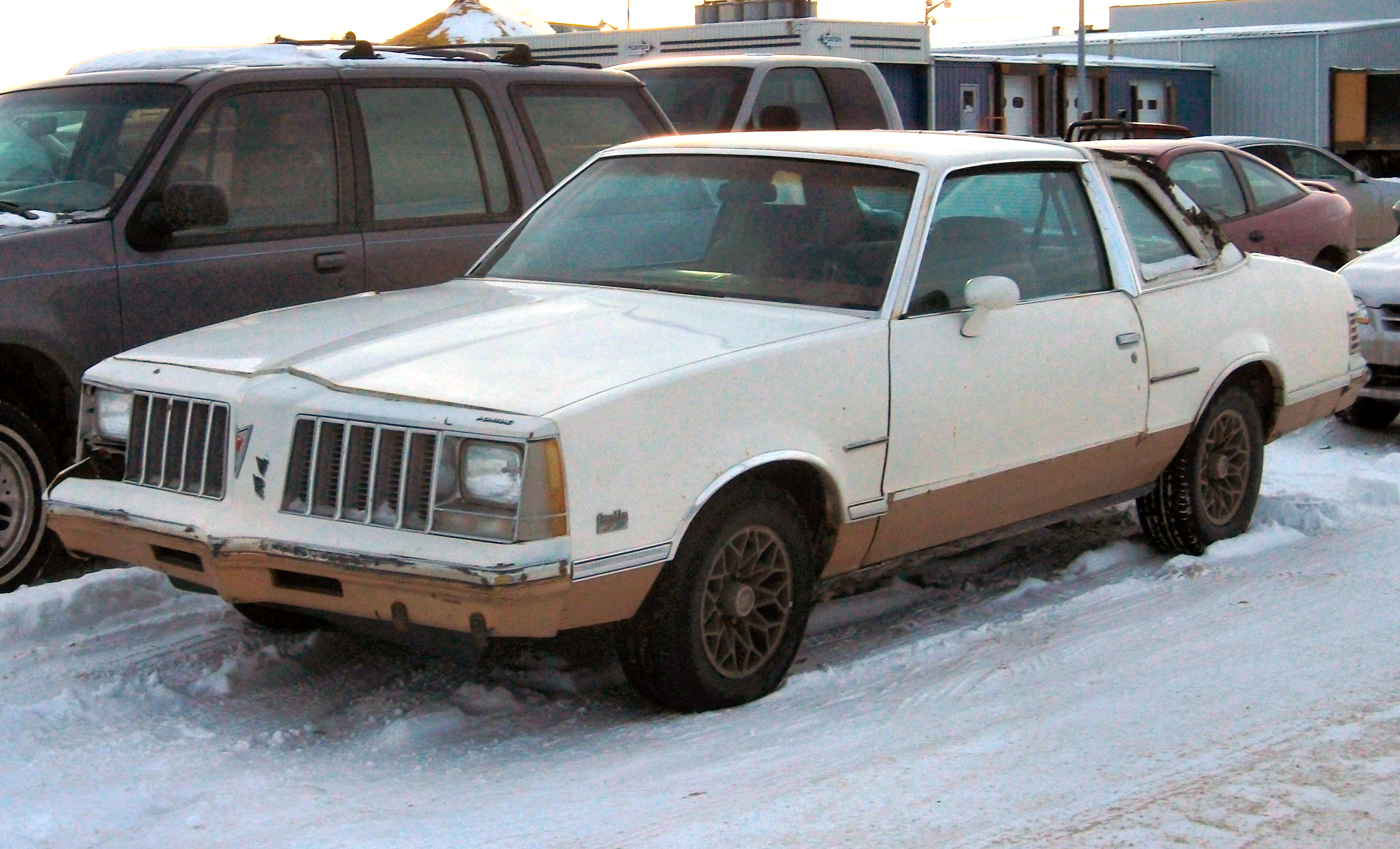
1979 Pontiac Grand Am

Very few changes were made for 1979 other than the normal trim revisions and the demotion of the standard powertrain to a Buick 231 cu in (3.8 L) V6 and floor-mounted three-speed manual transmission as standard equipment. The 301 V8, rated at 135 hp (101 kW; 137 PS) with a two-barrel carburetor or 150 hp (112 kW; 152 PS) with four-barrel, and Turbo Hydra-matic transmission were now optional. In terms of appearance, the only difference was that the park/signal and marker lenses were changed to amber ones.

New for 1979 was a four-speed manual available with the 150-horsepower 301 four-barrel in 49 states. In California, only an automatic transmission was available and engine offerings included the standard Buick 231 cu in (3.8 L) V6 engine with two-barrel carburetor and 115 hp (86 kW; 117 PS) or optional Chevrolet 305 V8 rated at 160 hp (119 kW; 162 PS) with four-barrel carb.

The wood-grained instrument panel was replaced by brushed aluminum trim, while the gauge faces changed from silver with black letters and numbers to black with white letters and numbers. The same seating choices in either cloth or Morrokide trims were offered including the standard notchback bench seat, or optional 60/40 bench or Strato bucket seats with console. An AM/FM CB radio combo was available and a heated rear window was optional.

In 1979, the Grand Am was featured in the NASCAR Grand National circuit.

=== 1980 ===
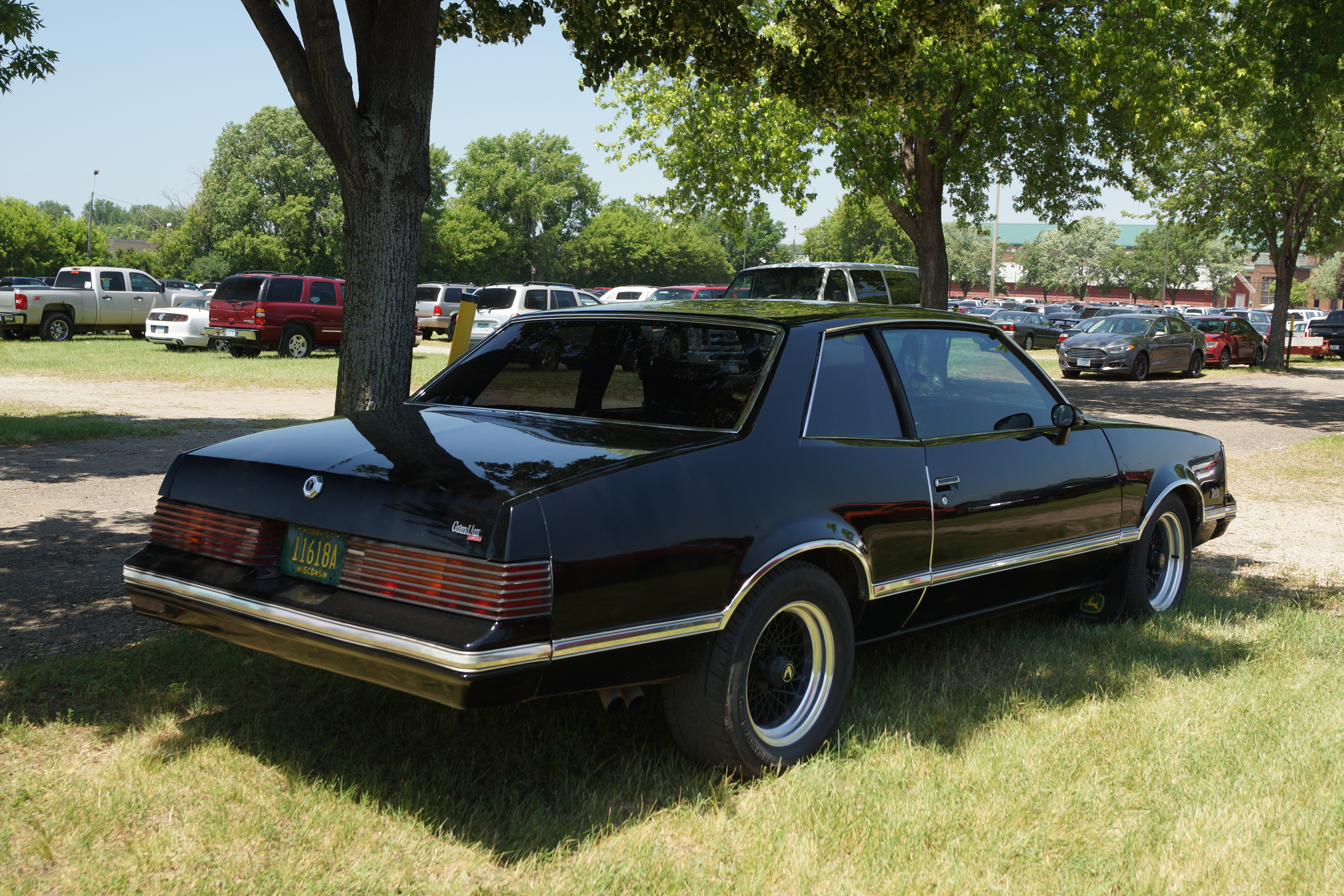
1980 Grand Am rear view

1980 was the final year for the second-generation Grand Am. The four-door sedan was dropped, leaving only the two-door coupe, which received minor appearance changes including the grille. Strato bucket seats in cloth or Morrokide upholstery were standard equipment along with a center console with floor shifter for the Turbo Hydra-matic transmission.

The V6 engine, two-barrel V8s and manual transmissions were dropped leaving the four-barrel Pontiac 301 V8 with 170 hp (127 kW; 172 PS) the only engine offered in 49 states or, in California, the 160 hp (119 kW; 162 PS) Chevrolet 305 V8. Slow sales of the Grand Am led to its discontinuation after the 1980 model year.

In the first year of the NASCAR Busch Series (1982) the championship was won by Jack Ingram in a 1980 Grand Am.

== Third generation (1985–1991) ==
Third generation
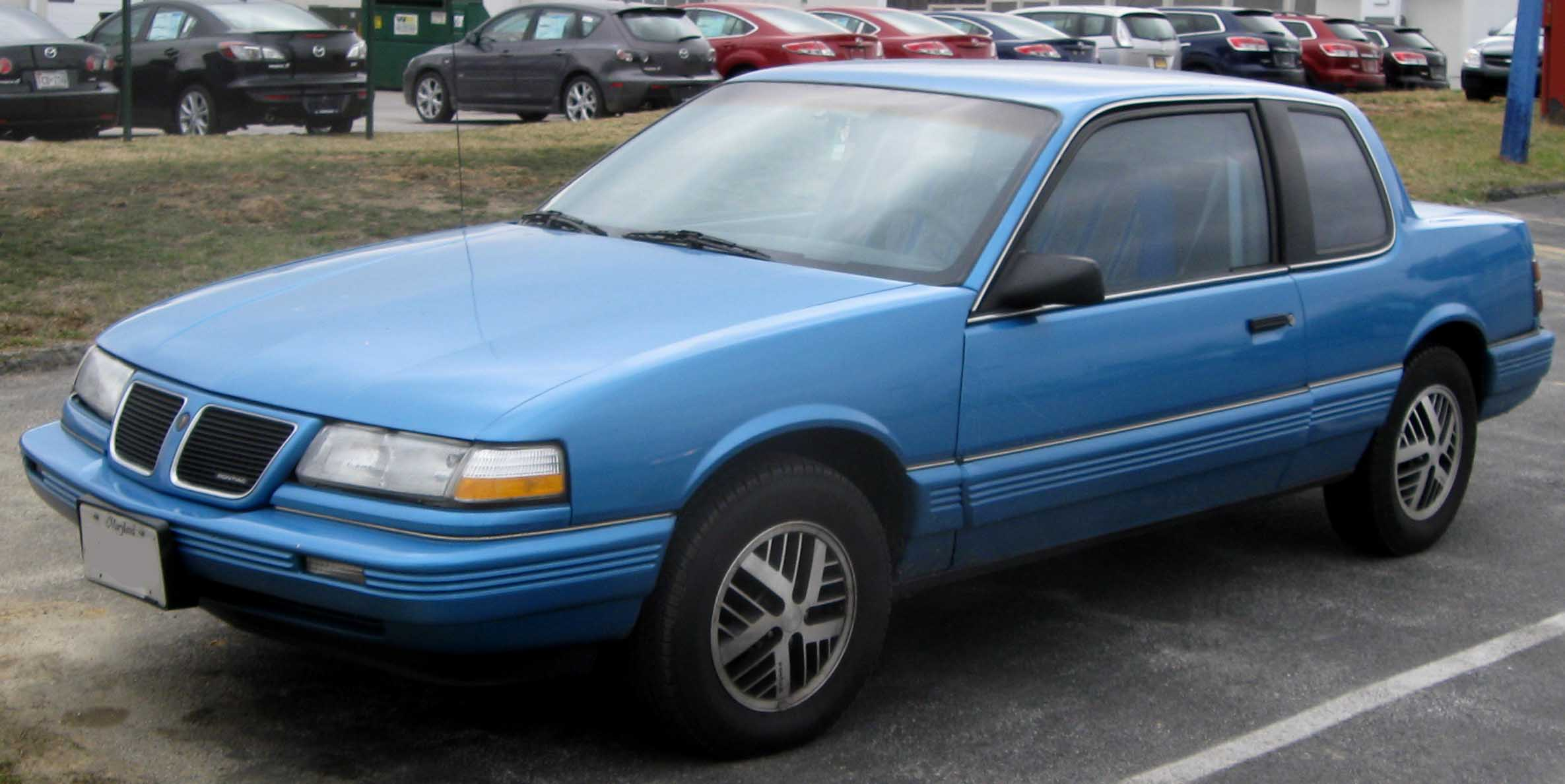

Overview
- Production: 1984–1991
- Model years: 1985–1991
- Assembly: United States: Lansing, Michigan

Body and chassis
- Class: Compact car
- Layout: Transverse front-engine, front-wheel drive
- Platform: N-body
- Related: Buick Skylark; Buick Somerset; Oldsmobile Cutlass Calais

Powertrain
- Engine: 2.0 L LT3 turbo I4; 2.3 L LD2 I4; 2.3 L LG0 I4; 2.5 L Tech IV I4; 3.0 L LN7 V6
- Transmission: 5-speed Isuzu manual 5-speed Getrag manual 3-speed THM125 automatic

Dimensions
- Wheelbase: 103.4 in (2,626 mm)
- Length: 177.5 in (4,508 mm) (1985–1988); 179.2 in (4,552 mm) (1989–1991)
- Width: 66.5 in (1,689 mm) (1989–1991); 66.7 in (1,694 mm) (1985–1988)
- Height: 52.6 in (1,336 mm)

For the 1985 model year, Pontiac reused the Grand Am name for a new compact car to replace the aging and unpopular Phoenix (based on GM's X Body) using the new-for-1985 N Body. The Grand Am shared the same front-wheel drive platform as the Buick Somerset (renamed Skylark in 1987) and the Oldsmobile Calais (renamed Cutlass Calais in 1988). Initially, the Grand Am was available in base or LE trim in coupes only. The 2.5 L Tech IV was standard, while a 3.0 L Buick V6 was optional. A 5-speed manual was standard, and a 3-speed automatic was optional, the latter required if the V6 engine was ordered. In 1986, a sedan and sportier SE trim were added. The SE trim had the V6 engine standard, lower body cladding, composite headlamps, a slightly revised interior with the different cloth used on all seats and door panel inserts, analog instrumentation (base and LE models had digital), and included 14-inch aluminum wheels.

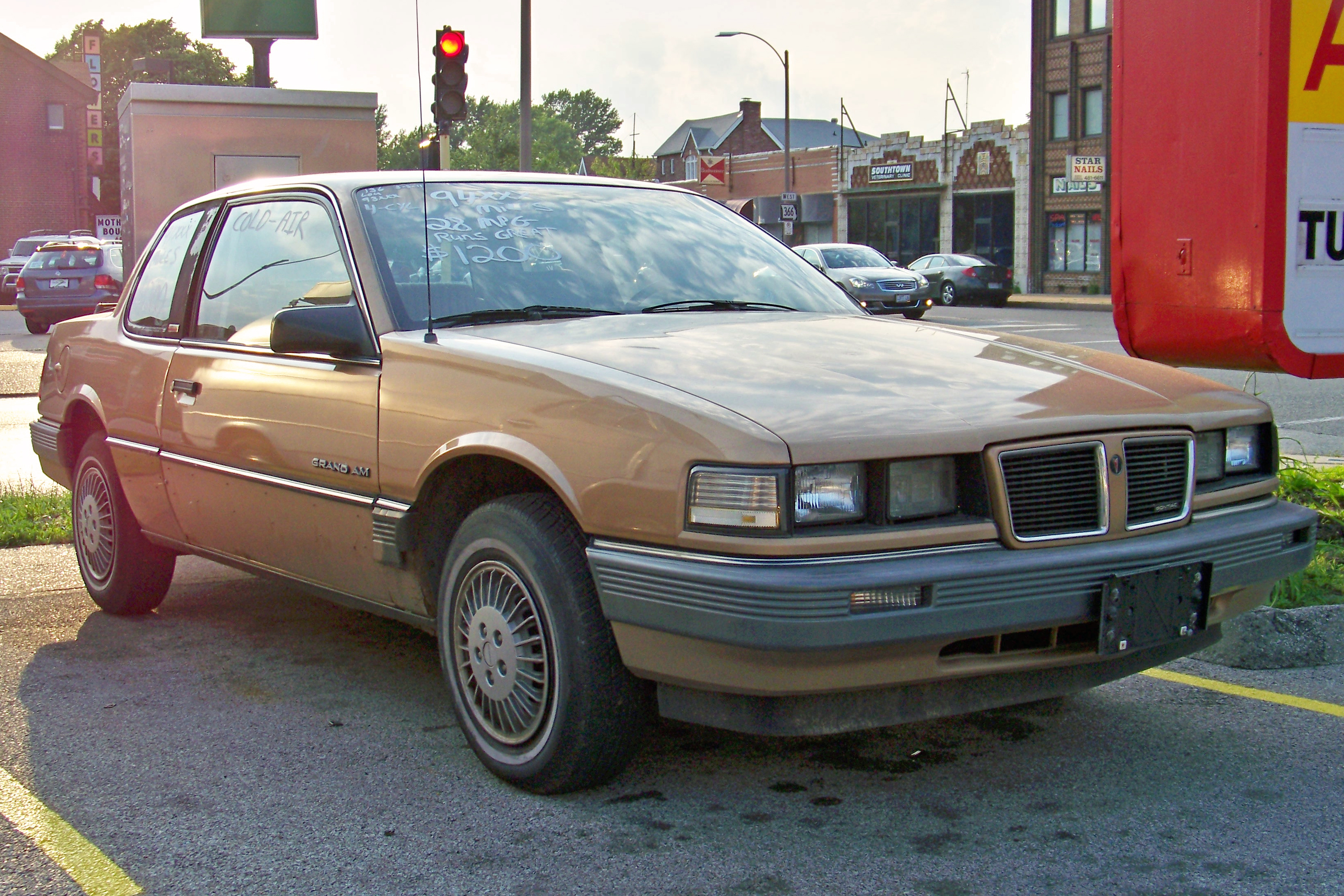
1985 Pontiac Grand Am coupe

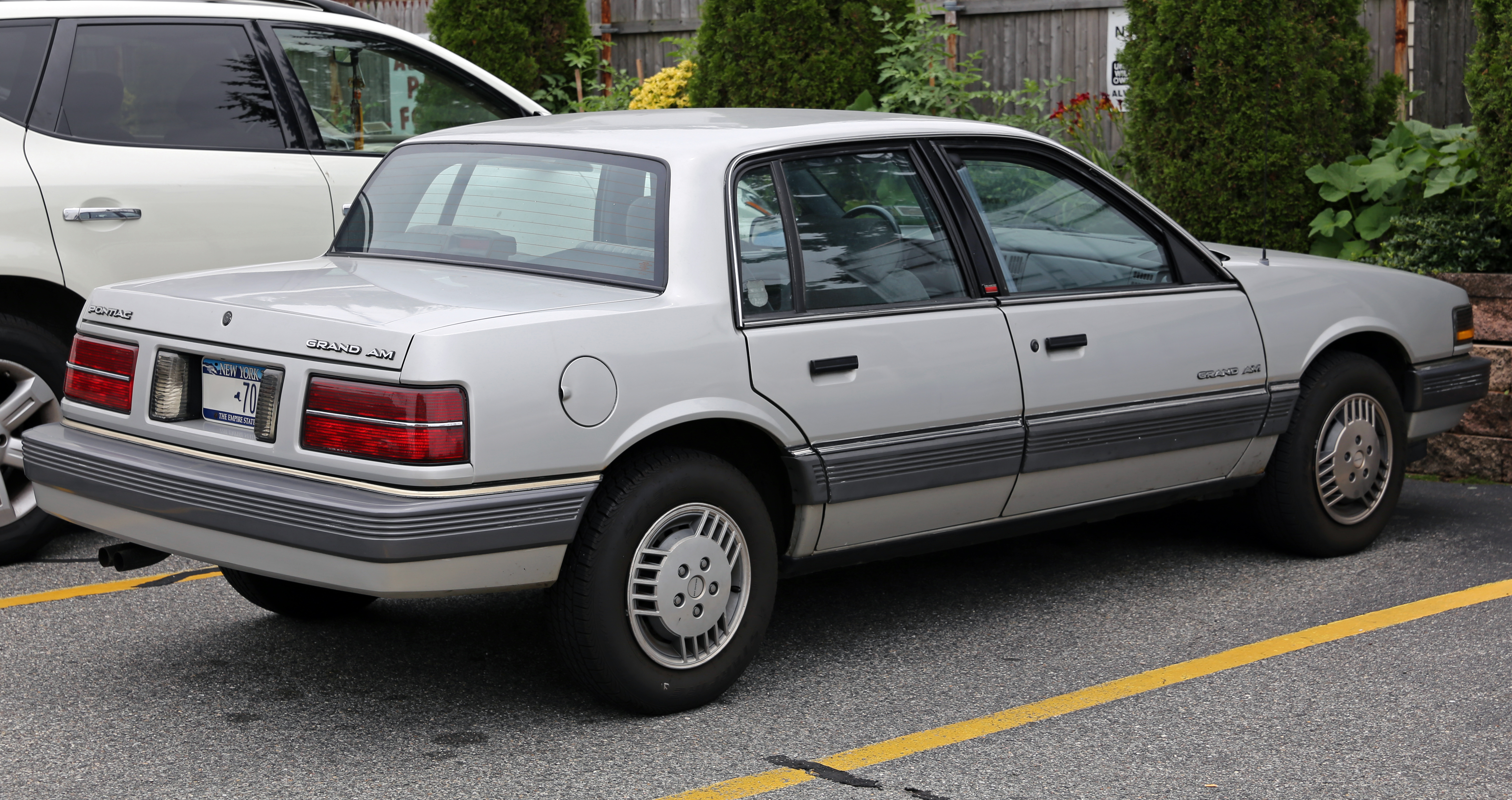
1988 Pontiac Grand Am sedan

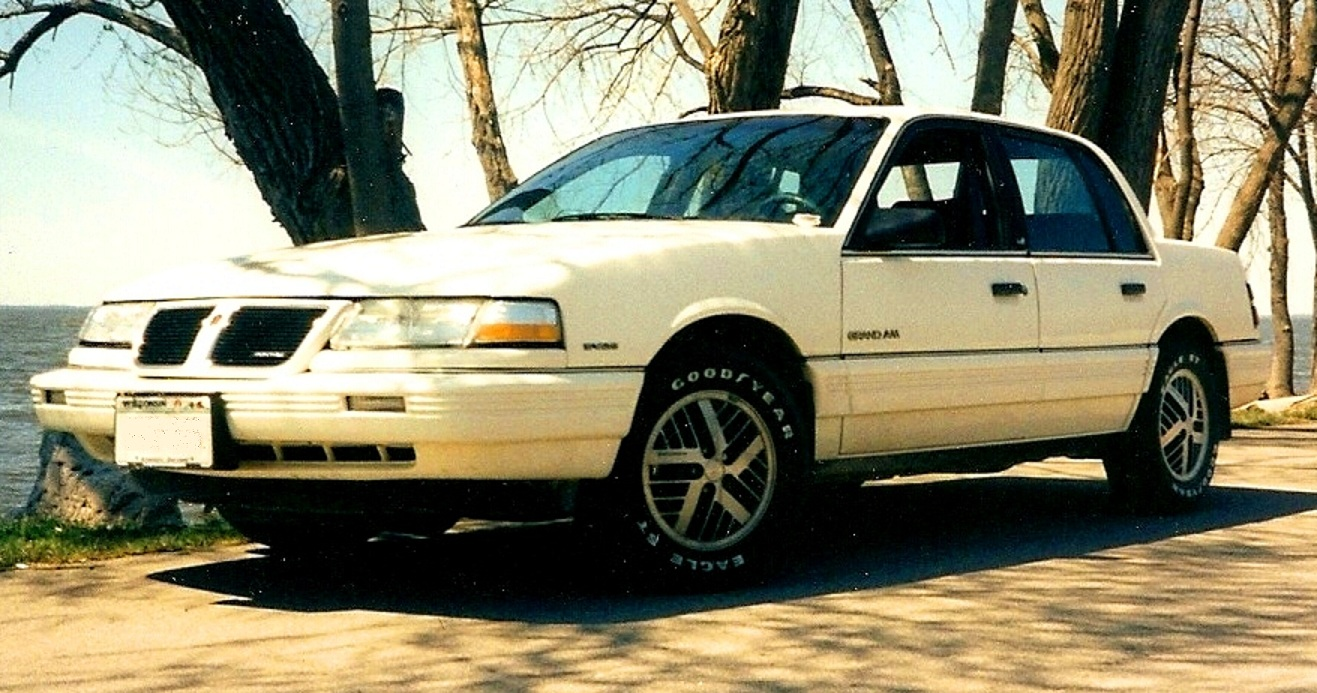
1991 Pontiac Grand Am sedan

1987 models brought more power to the base engine, and a new Turbocharged four-cylinder engine taken from the Sunbird GT. The 2.0 L turbo engine became the base engine for the SE model for 1987. Cars with the turbo engine received a turbo boost gauge in the place of the voltmeter. A test by Popular Mechanics for quarter-mile acceleration with the Turbo engine resulted with the 5-speed manual taking 15.73 seconds and 16.02 seconds with the automatic transmission. They noted large amounts of torque steer from a dead stop. This was also the last year that the Buick sourced 3.0 L engine would be available in the Grand Am, as it was discontinued in mid-1987. New for styling were composite front headlights, but only on the LE models.

For 1988, front seat belts were moved from the b-pillars to the doors, to meet the passive restraint mandate for 1989. The LD2 engine became available for Grand Am's in 1988, replacing the previous model year's 3.0 L V6 on the options list. It is worth noting that 'Sport buckets' borrowed from the Trans Am GTA, were added to the options list this year for SE's. Other options included a Driver Information Center, an electric trunk release, and a moon roof. The base model was dropped after this model year.

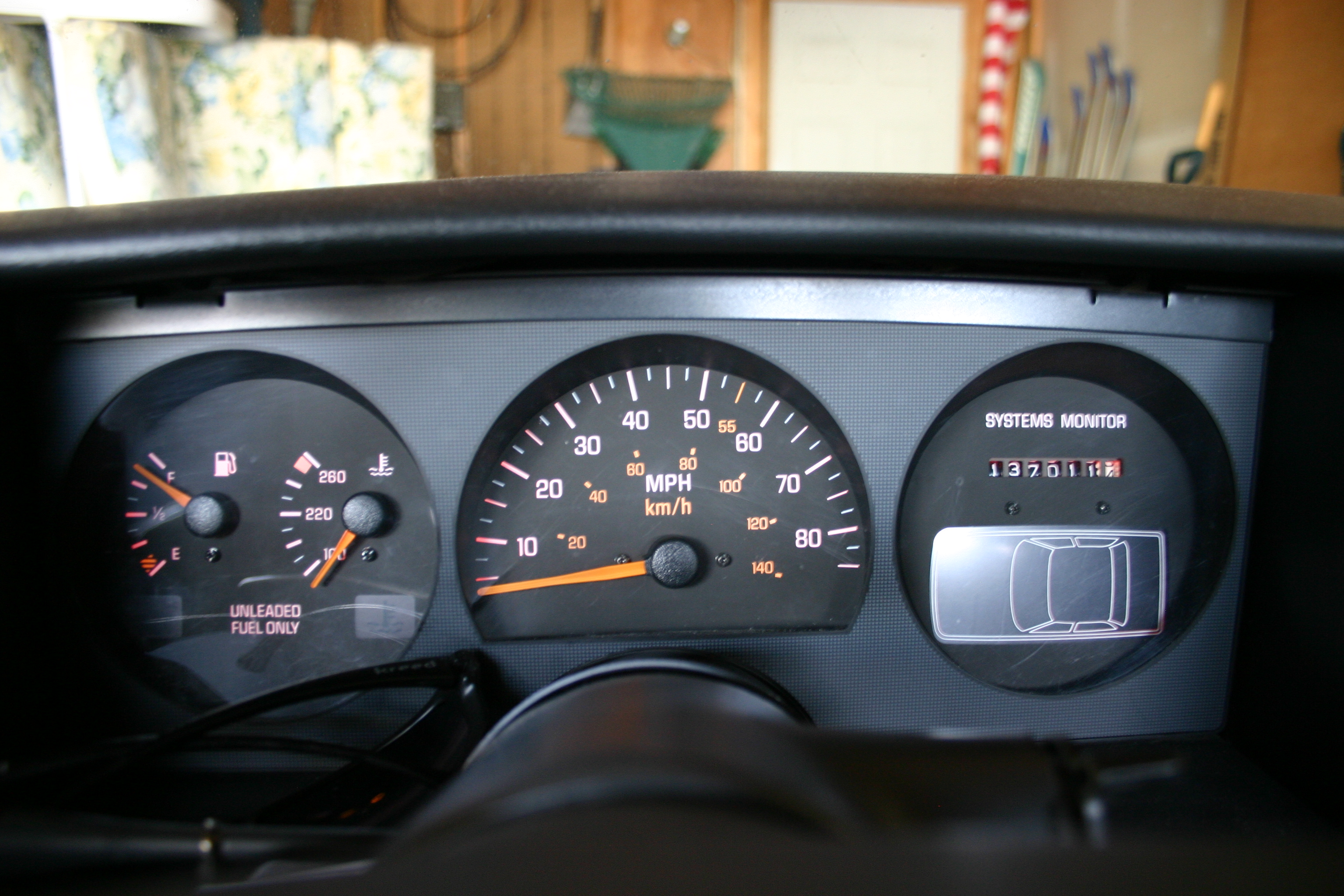
The standard 1988 Pontiac Grand Am dash

A totally new front and rear fascia along with an interior redesign for 1989. The 2.5 L gained balance shafts and an increase of power. The 2.3 L 'LD2' Quad 4 replaced the 2.0 L Turbo engine as standard equipment in the SE midway through the year. This was the final year that the 'Sport Bucket' seats were available to SEs.

The 2.3 L LG0 Quad 4 was announced as being available late in the model year on Grand Am SE's with only 200 were built. All 1989 LG0 Quad 4 Grand Am's were red on grey coupes, with standard appointments including (but not limited to) 16-inch machined-face wheels. The 16-inch wheels were only optional to SE's. This would be the first year that the Grand A-inch could be ordered with either 16-inch wheels or a factory-installed CD player.

NHSTA safety ratings for frontal crashes are as follows: Driver: 3-stars; Passenger: 4-stars.

Changes were minor for 1990 and 1991;
For 1990, a new high-output version of the Quad 4 (mated to only a 5-speed manual) became the standard engine for the SE. Opting for the automatic transmission changed the engine to the less powerful LD2 Quad 4. The 16-inch wheels moved from the option list to standard equipment for the SE's this year. The LE gained a 'Sport Performance Package' (RPO: W32) late in the 1990 model year run. The W32 option included SE ground effects (minus wheel well flares), the same standard (as well as optional) "SE" drive train, 14-inch aluminum wheels, a larger front sway bar, and a rear swaybar that were only otherwise available on the SE model. 1991 was the final model year of this body style and it was essentially a carry-over year. The only changes were the addition of an Anti-lock braking system (ABS) as standard equipment for all Grand Am SE's (not available to LE's), and all 1991 model year cars fitted with a 5-speed transmission received a redesigned "short throw" shifter.

For 1992 the Grand Am entered its fourth generation.

Available engines:

- 1985–1991: 2.5 L Tech IV TBI I4 engine: 90 hp 1985–86, 98 hp (73 kW) MPG EPA City/Hwy/Overall 21/29/23(w/3-speed auto) 1987–88, 110 hp (82 kW) MPG EPA City/Hwy/Overall 21/28/23 1989–91.
- 1985–mid-1987: 3.0 L Buick LN7 V6 engine with MPFI: 125 hp (93 kW), 150 lb⋅ft (200 N⋅m) of torque
- mid-1987-1989: 2.0 L MPFI turbocharged I4 engine: 165 hp (123 kW), 175 lb⋅ft (237 N⋅m) of torque, Maximum Boost 10 PSI, MPG: EPA City/Hwy 18/27
- 1988–1991: 2.3 L LD2 Quad 4 MPFI I4 engine: 160 hp (120 kW), 155 lb⋅ft (210 N⋅m) of torque
- 1989–1991: 2.3 L LG0 Quad 4 HO MPFI I4 engine: 180 hp (130 kW), 160 lb⋅ft (220 N⋅m) of torque

Available transmissions:

- 1985–1991: Isuzu-sourced 5-speed manual with overdrive (2.5-liter only)
- 1988–1991: Muncie-sourced, Getrag-designed 5-speed manual with overdrive (Quad 4 only)
- 1985–1991: 3T40 3-speed automatic (not available on HO Quad 4)

== Fourth generation (1992–1998) ==
Fourth generation
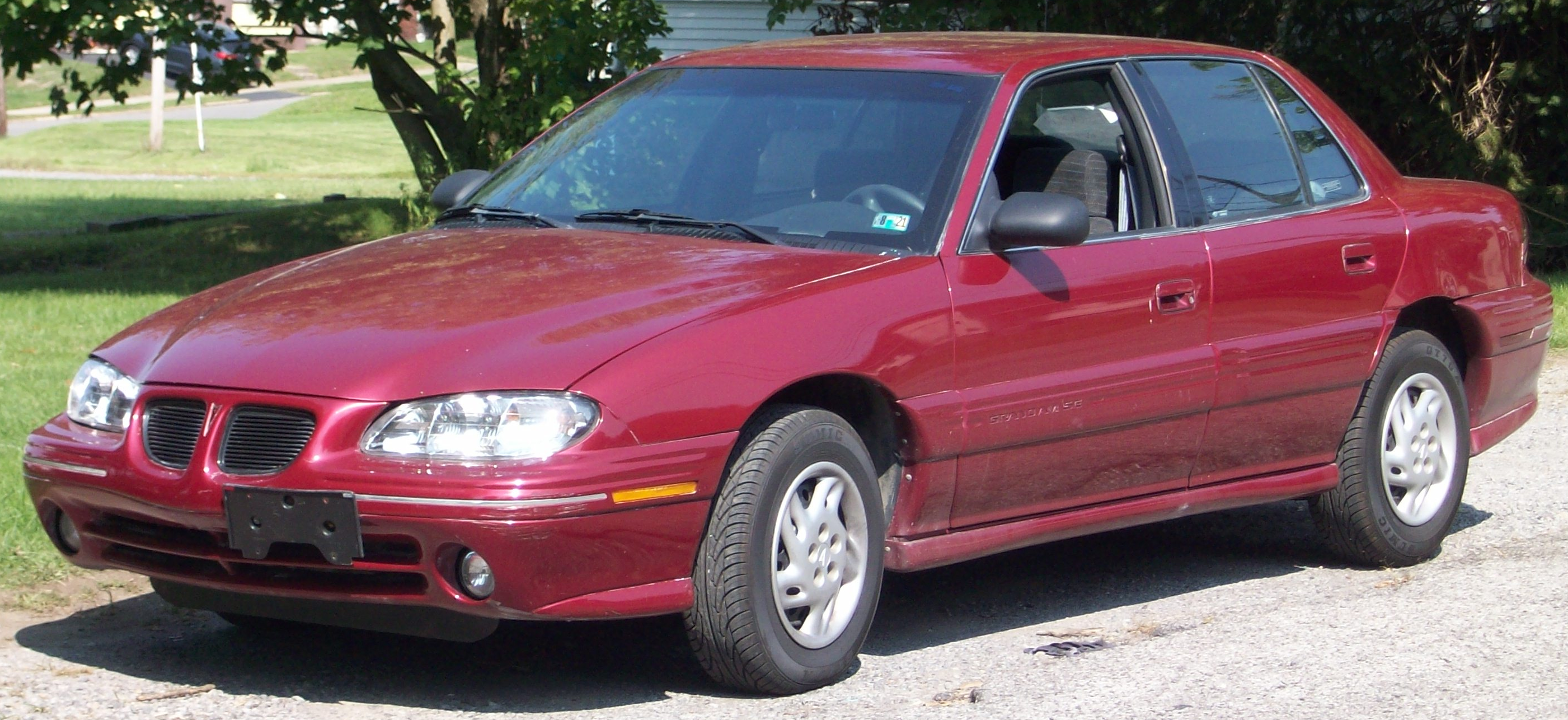
- 1996–98 Grand Am SE (facelift)

Overview
- Production: 1991–1998
- Model years: 1992–1998
- Assembly: United States: Lansing, Michigan

Body and chassis
- Class: Compact car
- Layout: Transverse front-engine, front-wheel drive
- Platform: N-body
- Related: Buick Skylark; Oldsmobile Achieva; Chevrolet Beretta; Chevrolet Corsica

Powertrain
- Engine: 2.3 L L40 I4; 2.3 L LD2/LG0 DOHC 16v I4; 2.4 L LD9 DOHC 16v I4; 3.1 L L82 OHV V6; 3.3 L LG7 OHV V6
- Transmission: 5-speed Getrag manual 5-speed Isuzu manual 3-speed 3T40 automatic 4-speed 4T60-E automatic

Dimensions
- Wheelbase: 103.4 in (2,626 mm)
- Length: 186.9 in (4,747 mm); 187.3 in (4,757 mm) (1993–95 Coupe)
- Width: 68.3 in (1,735 mm) (1996–98); 68.7 in (1,745 mm) (1993–95); 67.5 in (1,714 mm) (1992)
- Height: 53.5 in (1,359 mm) (1993–98); 53.2 in (1,351 mm) (1992)
- Curb weight: Coupe: 2,881 lb (1,307 kg); Sedan: 2,954 lb (1,340 kg)

For 1992 the Grand Am's N-body platform was widened to match the Corsica's; the suspension and braking systems are about eighty percent in common. On the SE, an anti-lock braking system (ABS VI) was available. It also received new bodywork and a revised interior. A V6 option returned in the form of the 160 hp (120 kW) 3.3 L 3300 V6, mated to a three-speed transmission. The 2.3 L I4 came as either a SOHC or DOHC. A high output version of the DOHC was offered as well. A new GT trim was offered that featured new wheels, smoother, yet larger cladding, and more standard equipment.

1993 brought further refinement to the Quad 4. This resulted in a loss of 5 horsepower (3.7 kW) to all engines. In 1994, the V6 and standard 3-speed powertrain were effectively replaced by GM's new 3.1 L 3100 series V6 engine and new 4-speed automatic transmission. A driver's side airbag also became standard for 1994, but the door-mounted automatic seatbelts remained. In 1995, the Quad 4 engines received balance shafts and direct driven power steering off the intake camshaft. The 4-speed automatic that was mated to the 3.1 L in 1994 became optional as a step-up from the 3-speed for 1995 on the new Quad 4 engine.

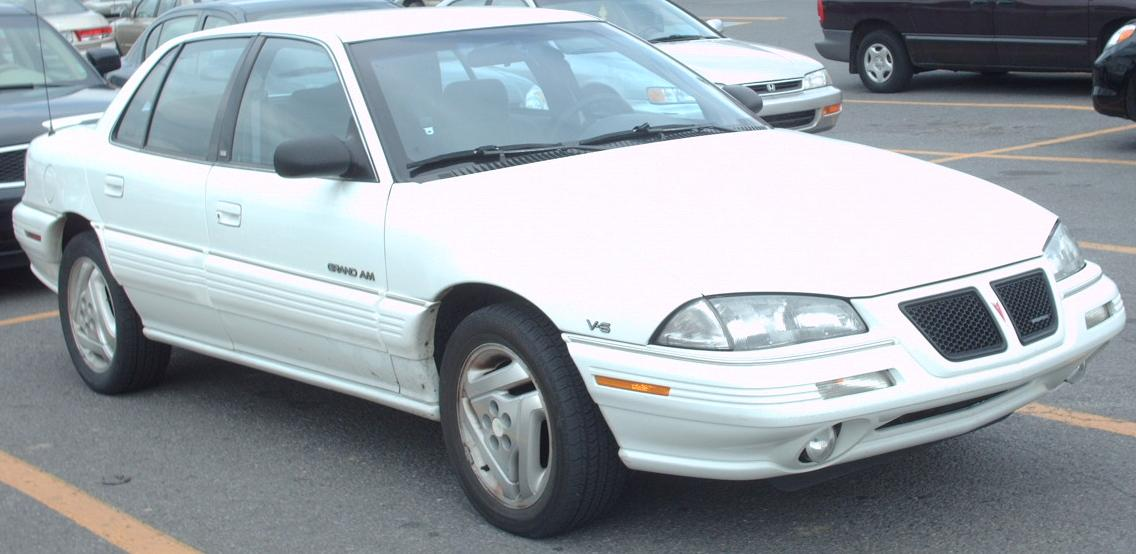
1992–1995 Pontiac Grand Am sedan

In Japan, this generation was officially imported by Yanase and Suzuki with left-hand drive. The main imports were the SE and V6 models. The V6 model, however, was only offered for the 1996 model year there. All models had a three-speed (later 4-speed) automatic transmission.

=== 1996–1998 ===
For 1996, the Grand Am received a mid-generation facelift. Outside, an updated front fascia, rear fascia, and side skirts gave the Grand Am a smoother, more rounded look. The interior was redesigned and featured dual airbags, easier to use audio system and HVAC controls, and softer plastics. The Quad 4 was replaced by a new 'Twin Cam' 2.4 L DOHC (Dual Over Head Cam) four-cylinder engine. Still based on the Quad 4, this was a re-engineered version of the previous year's 2.3 L with SFI fuel injection. The new engine made 155 lb⋅ft (210 N⋅m) of torque at lower rpm than the older 2.3 L. The 3.1 L V6 remained optional. The 3-speed automatic was dropped for 1996, and the 4-speed automatic featured standard traction control. Daytime running lamps with automatic lighting control were newly standard on all Grand Ams. 1997 models featured standard air conditioning. The Grand Am was redesigned for 1999.

Available engines:

- 1992–1994: 2.3 L SOHC L40 I4. 120 hp (115 in 1993 and 1994), 140 lb⋅ft (190 N⋅m) of torque
- 1992–1994: 2.3 L DOHC Quad 4 I4: 160 hp (155 in 1993 and 1994), 155 lb⋅ft (210 N⋅m) of torque
- 1992–1994: 2.3 L DOHC Quad 4 HO I4: 180 hp (175 in 1993 and 1994), 160 lb⋅ft (220 N⋅m) of torque
- 1992–1993: 3.3 L 3300 MPFI V6: 150 hp (110 kW), 185 lb⋅ft (251 N⋅m) of torque
- 1994–1998: 3.1 L 3100 SFI V6: 155 hp (116 kW), 185 lb⋅ft (251 N⋅m) of torque
- 1995: 2.3 L DOHC Quad 4 I4: 150 hp (112 kW), 155 lb⋅ft (210 N⋅m) of torque
- 1996–1998: 2.4 L DOHC Twin Cam I4: 150 hp (110 kW), 155 lb⋅ft (210 N⋅m) of torque

Available transmissions:

- 1992–1994: Muncie-sourced, Getrag-designed 5-speed manual with overdrive ('Quad 4 HO' only)
- 1992–1998: Isuzu-sourced 5-speed manual with overdrive (1992-1994 'Quad OHC' only; 1995-1998 'Quad 4' & 'Twin Cam' only)
- 1992–1995: 3T40 3-speed automatic
- 1994–1998: 4T60-E 4-speed automatic with overdrive (available with 3100 SFI V6 beginning in 1994)
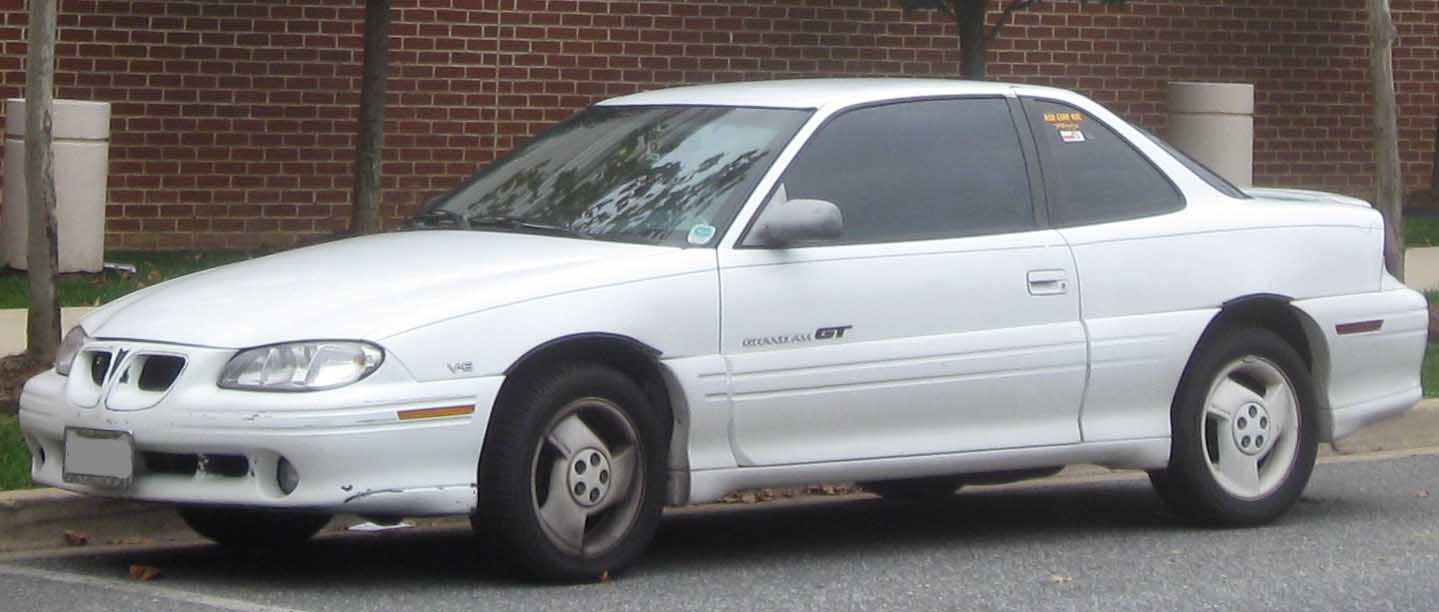
1996–1998 Pontiac Grand Am coupe

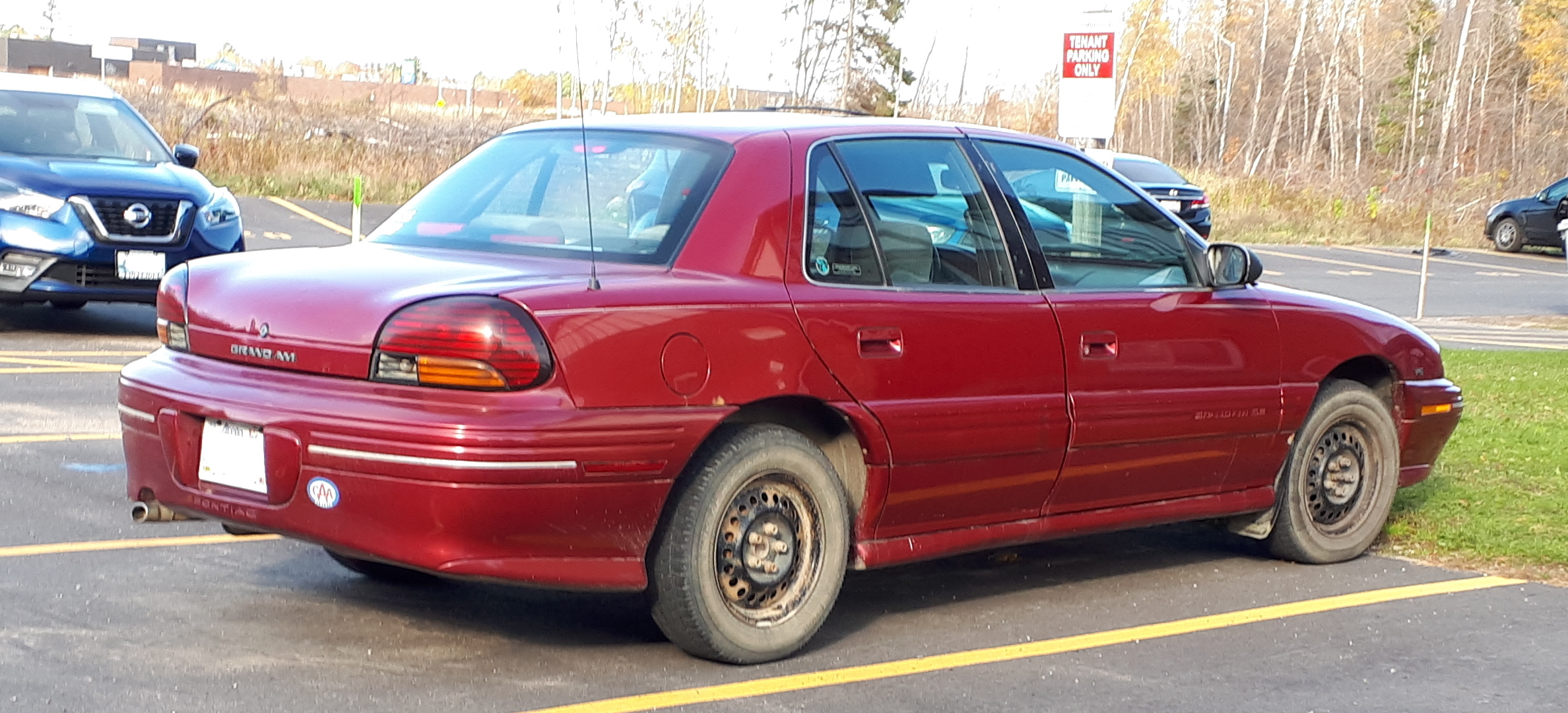
1996–1998 Pontiac Grand Am sedan

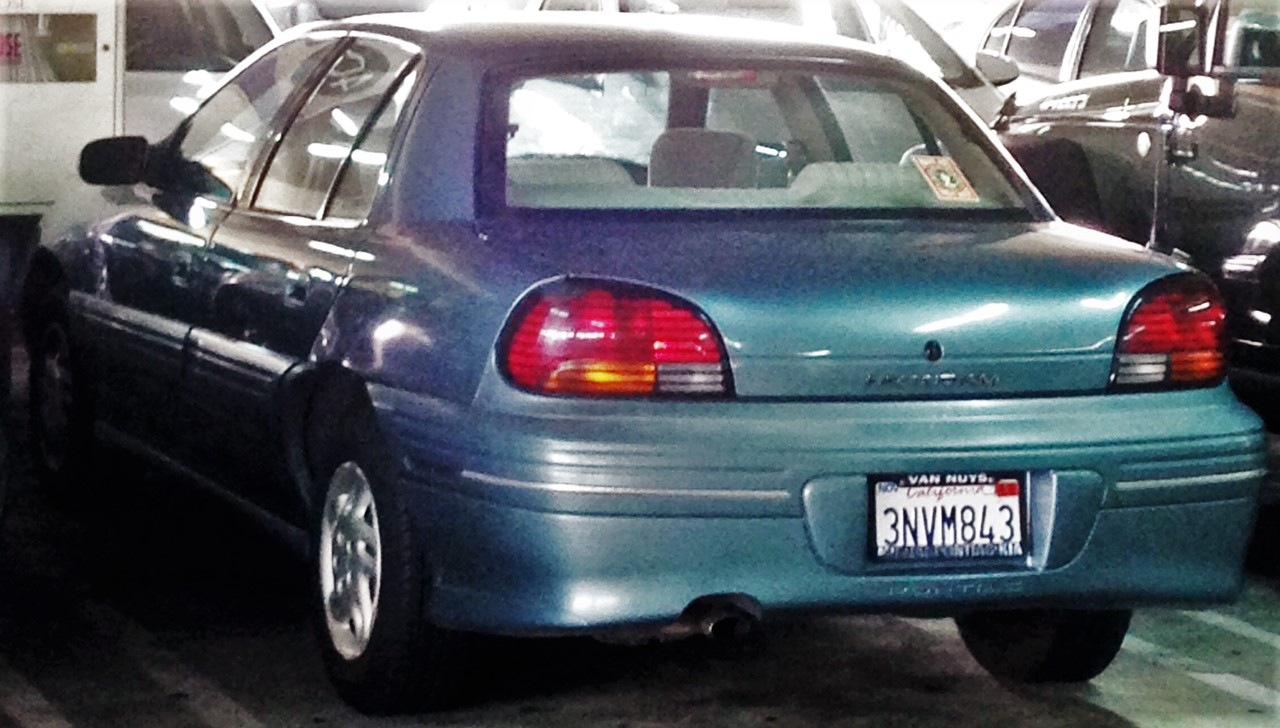
1996–1998 Pontiac Grand Am sedan (rear view)

== Fifth generation (1999–2005) ==
Fifth generation
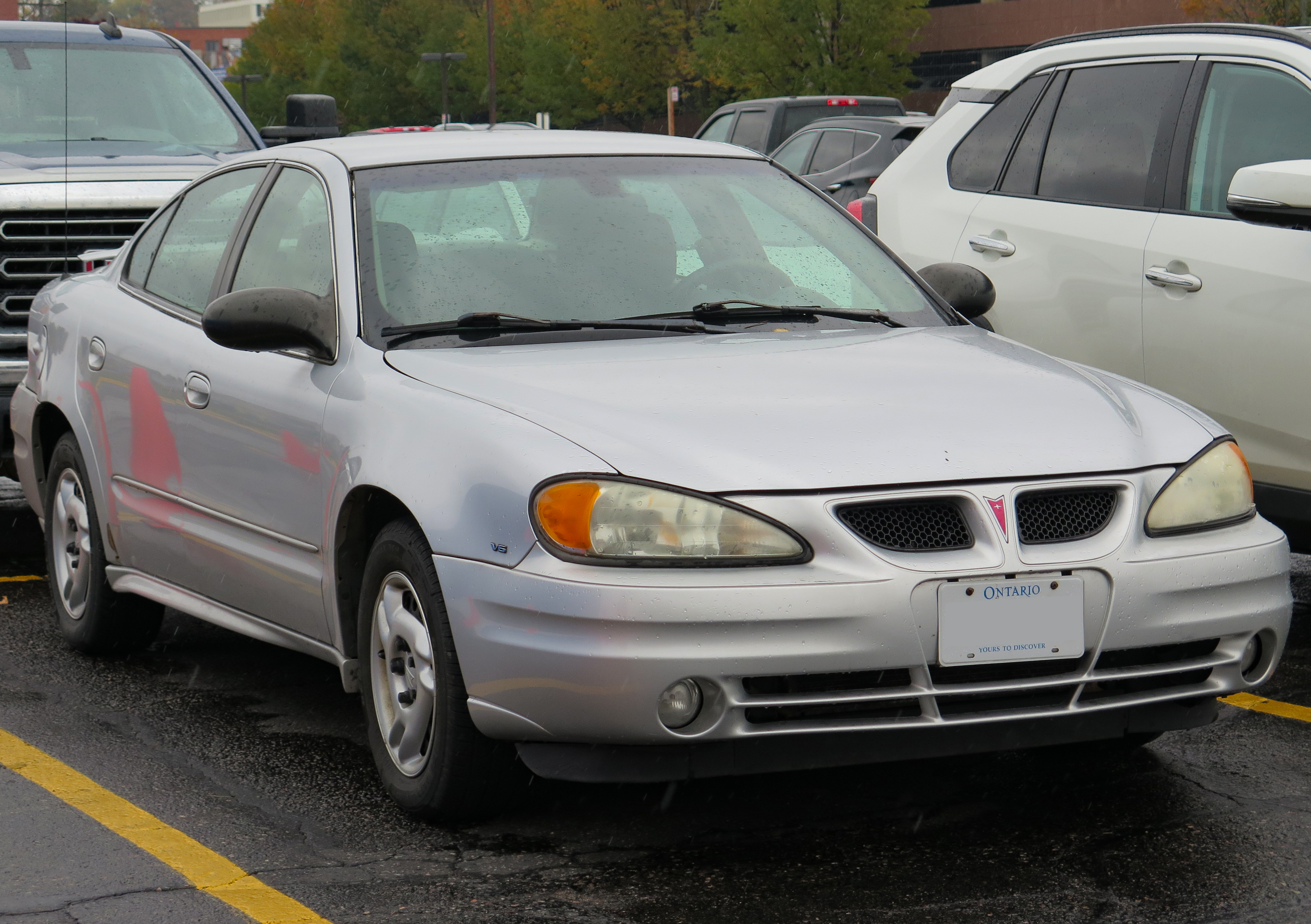

Overview
- Production: April 1998 – May 10, 2005
- Model years: 1999–2005
- Assembly: United States: Lansing, Michigan

Body and chassis
- Class: Compact car
- Layout: Transverse front-engine, front-wheel drive
- Platform: N-body/GMX130
- Related: Oldsmobile Alero; Oldsmobile Cutlass; Chevrolet Malibu

Powertrain
- Engine: 2.2 L L61 Ecotec I4; 2.4 L LD9 Twin Cam I4; 3.4 L LA1 V6
- Transmission: 5-speed Getrag F23 manual 4-speed 4T40-E automatic 4-speed 4T45-E automatic

Dimensions
- Wheelbase: 107.0 in (2,718 mm)
- Length: 186.3 in (4,732 mm)
- Width: 70.4 in (1,788 mm)
- Height: 55.1 in (1,400 mm)
- Curb weight: Coupe: 3,066 lb (1,391 kg); Sedan: 3,116 lb (1,413 kg)

Available in late spring 1998, the basic design of the fifth-generation Grand Am was shared with the Oldsmobile Alero (also new for 1999) and Chevrolet Malibu (introduced in 1996). The length was shortened slightly, but the wheelbase grew by more than three inches (76 mm). The suspension was now fully independent, with a revised MacPherson-Strut design upfront. The rear suspension is a more refined Multi-link design. The new Grand Am was offered in five trim levels: SE, SE1, SE2, GT, and GT1. The 2.4 L Twin Cam engine was carried over, with 150 hp (112 kW; 152 PS) and 155 lb⋅ft (210 N⋅m) of torque. GM's 3400 V6, previously exclusive to their minivans, became available as an option on the SE and SE1 and was standard on all other trim levels. For 1999, all the Grand Ams featured a 4-speed automatic transmission. The GT and GT1 also included 4-wheel disc brakes, and all Grand Ams until 2003 included standard ABS and Traction Control (made optional on SE from 2003). The GTs also had a Ram Air induction system, providing an extra five horsepower and 5 lb/ft of torque over the 3.4 L V6 when installed in any of the SE-level trims.

The 2000 models added a Getrag 5-speed manual transmission as standard equipment with the four-cylinder. On GT models, the badge on the front fenders now read "RamAir V6", instead of "V6H.O." on 1999 GT's. ASC Creative Services designed the Grand Am SC/T for the SEMA show circuit, which was the concept design for the Ram Air hood and body package. The SC/T later became an appearance package, beginning in 2003. A road test by Car and Driver showed a 0-60 mph time of 7.7 seconds in a GT sedan with an automatic.

For 2001, the SE2 trim level was dropped, a new family of Delco stereos and new wheel designs was introduced. The radio size in 2001 also changed from a 1.5 DIN size to a full 2 DIN size. Halfway through 2002, the Twin Cam 2.4 L engine was replaced by a new 2.2 L Ecotec four-cylinder, which had improvements over the engine it replaced, but produced less output; 140 hp (104 kW; 142 PS) and 150 lb⋅ft (203 N⋅m) of torque. Changes for 2002 also included a stationary cup holder in the center console as opposed to a removable one.

The body cladding on SE models was removed in 2003, a change which affected other models throughout Pontiac. Also in 2003, anti-lock brakes and traction control were made optional on the SE. In 2004, an MP3 player was added to the uplevel CD player. In 2005, Pontiac began phasing out the Grand Am lineup for the new G6 replacement. SE sedans were retained for fleet sale and GT coupes were the last Grand Am model available for public sale.

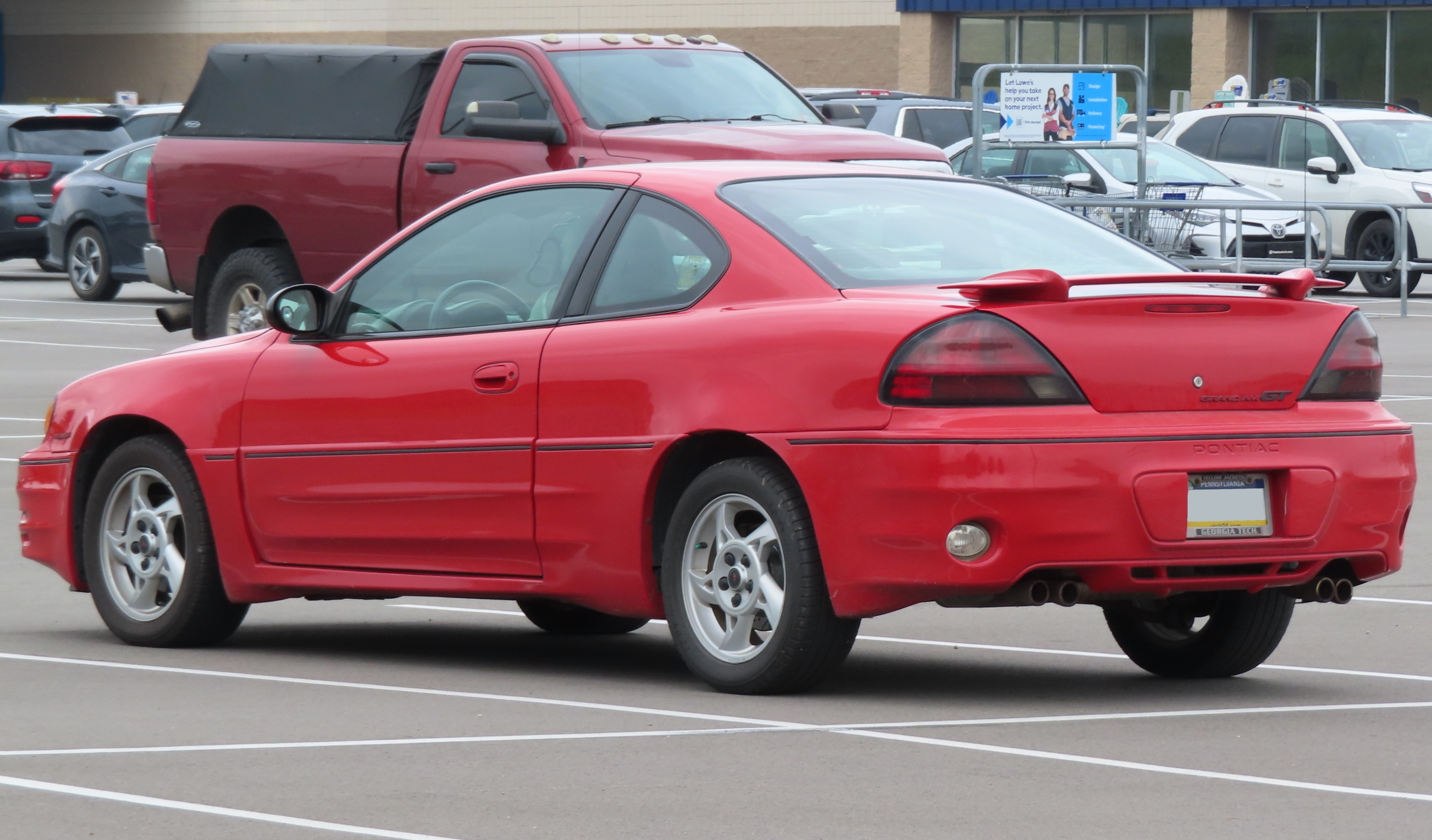
2005 Pontiac Grand Am GT Coupe

Available engines:

- 1999–2002: 2.4 L DOHC Twin Cam L4 (LD9 model) engine: 150 hp (110 kW), 155 lb⋅ft (210 N⋅m) of torque
- 2002–2005: 2.2 L DOHC Ecotec L4 engine: 140 hp (100 kW), 150 lb⋅ft (200 N⋅m) of torque
- 1999–2005: 3.4 L 3400 OHV V6: 170 hp,(175 for GT) 200 lb⋅ft (270 N⋅m) of torque (205 for GT)

Available transmissions:

- 1999–2005: 4-speed automatic with overdrive (4T40-E for four-cylinder engines, 4T45-E for V6 engines)
- 2000–2005: Getrag 5-speed manual with overdrive (four-cylinder engines only)

=== Safety ===
The Insurance Institute for Highway Safety (IIHS) gives the 1999-2005 Grand Am a "Poor" rating in its frontal crash test for marginal structural integrity, a possible head injury, a potential right leg injury, and poor dummy control.

2003 National Highway Traffic Safety Administration (NHTSA) Crash Test Ratings (coupe):

- Frontal Driver:
- Frontal Passenger:
- Side Driver:
- Side Rear Passenger:
- Rollover:

2003 National Highway Traffic Safety Administration (NHTSA) Crash Test Ratings (sedan):

- Frontal Driver:
- Frontal Passenger:
- Side Driver:
- Side Rear Passenger:
- Rollover:

== Sales ==
Calendar year	Sales
1992	279,230
1993	242,856
1994	262,310
1995	234,226
1996	222,477
1997	204,078
1998	180,428
1999	234,936
2000	214,923
2001	182,046
2002	150,818
2003	156,466
2004	133,707
2005	31,613
2006	828
