= General Motors Theta platform =

GM Theta platform
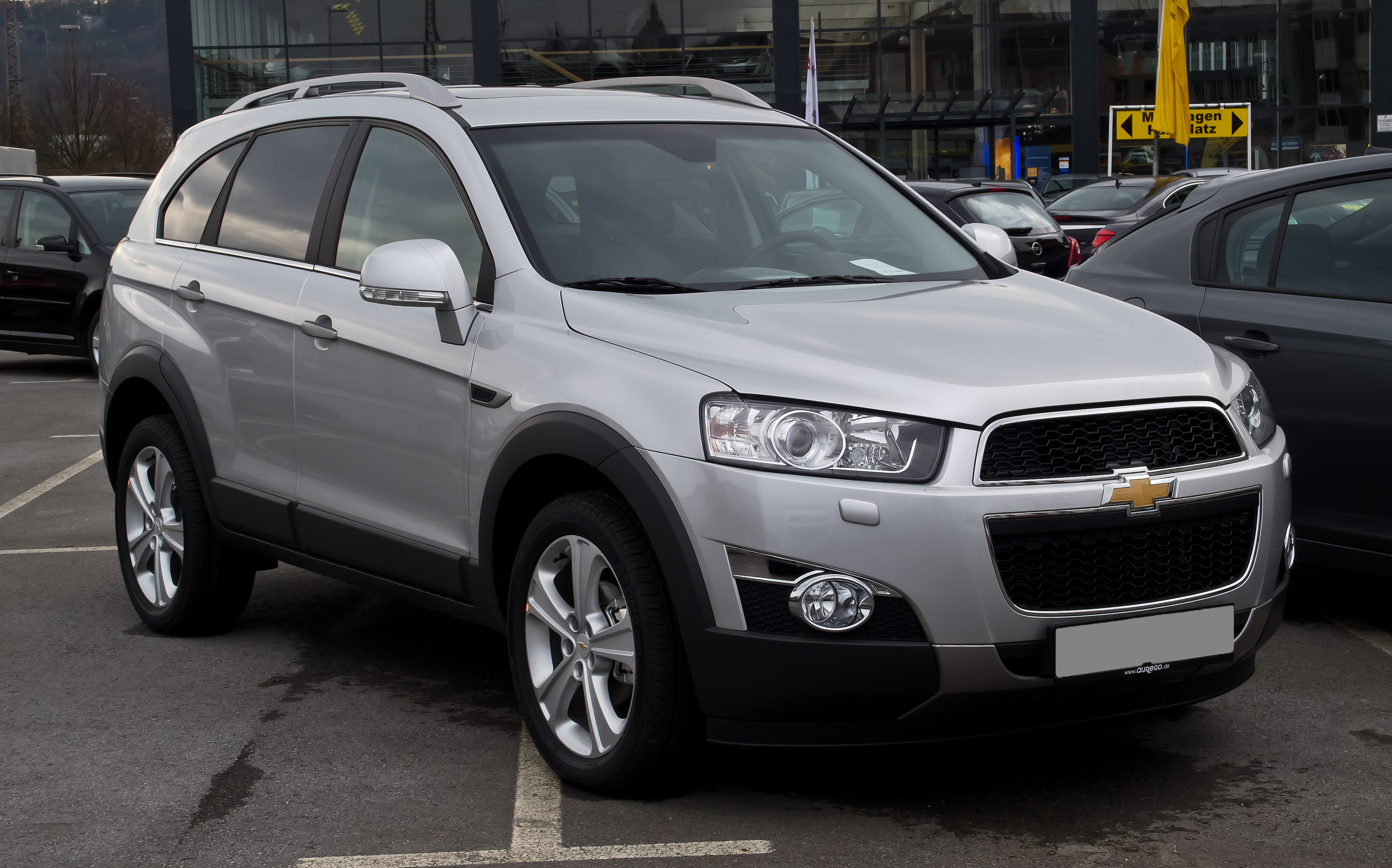

Overview
- Manufacturer: General Motors
- Production: 2002–2018

Body and chassis
- Class: Compact/Mid-size crossover SUV
- Vehicles: Chevrolet Captiva; Chevrolet Captiva Sport; Chevrolet Equinox; Daewoo Winstorm; Pontiac Torrent; Saturn Vue; Suzuki XL7; GMC Terrain; Saab 9-4X; Opel Antara

Chronology
- Successor: GM D2XX platform (for short wheelbase); GM C1XX platform (for long wheelbase and Theta Premium); GM VSS-S

Theta is General Motors' automobile platform for compact/mid-size crossover SUVs. The architecture debuted in 2002 with the Saturn Vue and was later used for the Chevrolet Equinox and Captiva and similar models.

== Development ==
The Theta uses a four-wheel independent suspension. Engine choices include the Family II straight-4, Ecotec straight-4, 3400 V6, and even a Honda V6, the L66. A 5-speed automatic and two 5-speed manual transmissions are used.

The original Saturn Vue used a short 106.6 in (2708 mm) wheelbase, with a 61 in (1549 mm) track. The Chevrolet Equinox and Pontiac Torrent use a stretched 112.5 in (2857 mm) wheelbase, but share much with the Saturn.

The Suzuki Grand Vitara, although similar in size and appearance to a Saturn Vue, was developed by Suzuki using some Theta components, but should not be considered a Theta derivative.

Engineering for the Opel Antara and Chevrolet Captiva was performed in large part in Korea by GM Daewoo Auto & Technology, and by Opel in Germany.

== Hybrids ==
The Saturn Vue was one of the first of General Motors' vehicles to be offered with a hybrid powertrain, GM's belt alternator starter (BAS) system, in 2006.

== Vehicles ==
- Short wheelbase:
  - 2002–2007 Saturn Vue
  - 2006–2015 Opel Antara
    - 2006–2011 Daewoo Winstorm MaXX*
    - 2006–2017 Chevrolet Captiva Sport*
    - 2008–2010 Saturn Vue*
    - 2008–2010 GMC Terrain (Middle Eastern market)*
    - 2006–2008 Holden Captiva Maxx*
    - 2009–2017 Holden Captiva 5*
  - 2006–2018 Chevrolet Captiva
    - 2006–2011 Daewoo Winstorm**
    - 2006–2018 Holden Captiva 7**

Note: Vehicles with "*" are rebadged versions of the Opel Antara
Note: Vehicles with "**" are rebadged versions of the Chevrolet Captiva

- Long wheelbase:
  - 2005–2009 Chevrolet Equinox
  - 2006–2009 Pontiac Torrent
  - 2006–2009 Suzuki XL7
  - 2010–2017 Chevrolet Equinox
  - 2010–2017 GMC Terrain
- Concepts:
  - Chevrolet S3X/T2X
  - GM HydroGen4

== Theta Premium ==
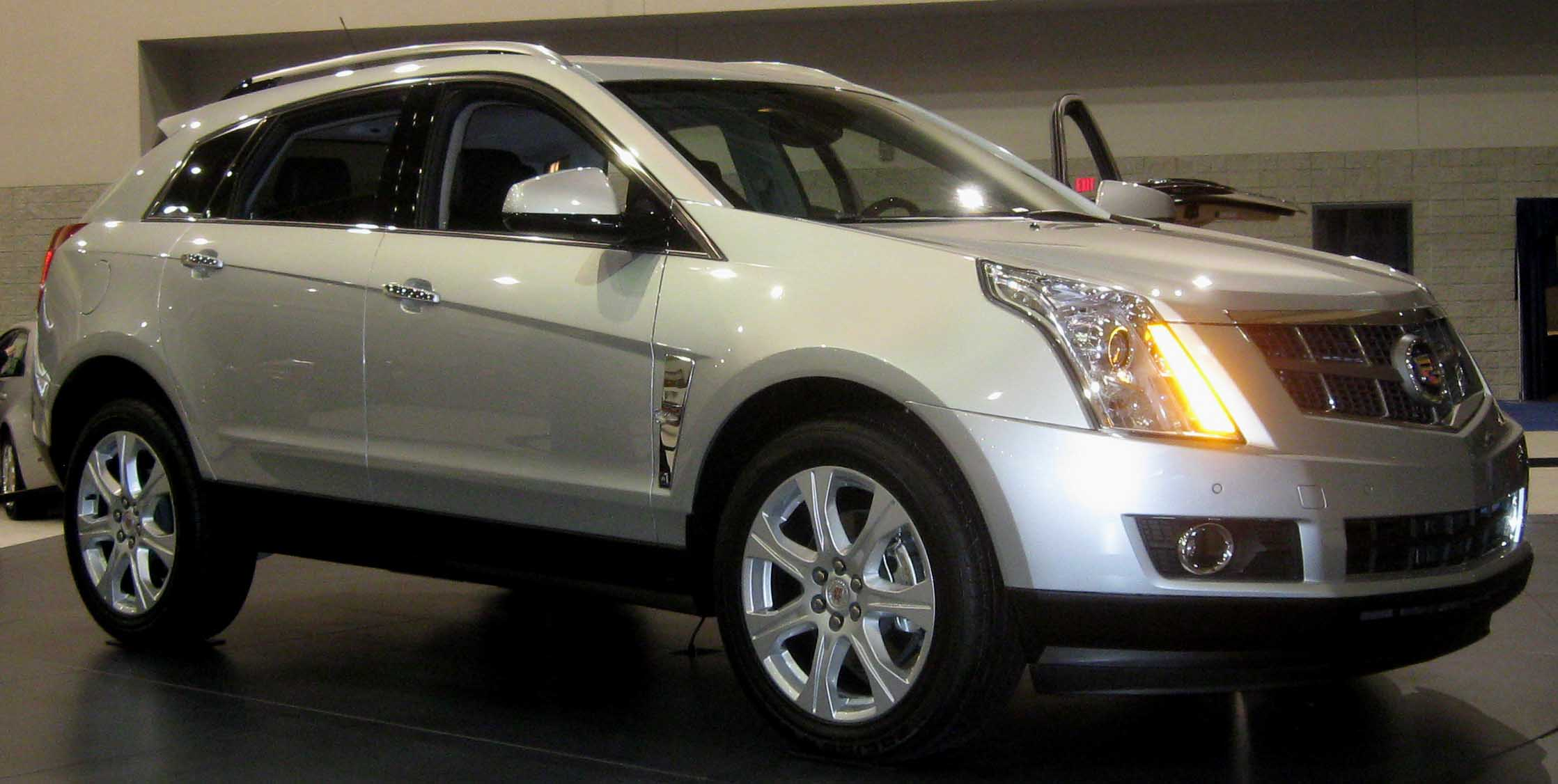
2010 Cadillac SRX

General Motors has created a premium version of Theta for luxury applications. It mixed elements of the current Theta and the new Epsilon 2 architecture. Thus, this platform is sometimes also referred to as Theta-Epsilon (GMT166). Theta Premium supports larger models than the standard platform.

Vehicles using Theta Premium:

- 2010–2016 Cadillac SRX
- 2011 Saab 9-4X

== See also ==
- List of General Motors platforms
