= AFS Trinity =

American automotive technology corporation

AFS Trinity Power Corp, Inc.
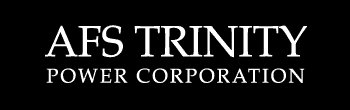
- Company type: Private
- Industry: Automotive
- Founded: 1991
- Headquarters: Medina, Washington, US
- Key people: Edward Furia (Chairman, C.E.O.) Joel Levinthal (President, C.O.O.); Laurie Westdahl (Corporate Secretary & Director); Peter N. Rogers (C.F.O. & Director); Timothy C. Kent (Director & Advisor on Public Communications); Donald Bender (C.T.O.); Dr. Edward S. Zorzi (Vice President Aerospace Operations); Philip K. Snyder (Chief Systems Engineer); Atul Deshmane (Automotive Systems Engineer) John V. Coyner (Director of Composite Rotor Programs)
- Products: Extreme Hybrid Drive Train
- Website: afstrinity.com

AFS Trinity Power Corporation is an American corporation headquartered in Medina, Washington, with an engineering center in Livermore, California, that develops technology for plug-in hybrids. The company has developed PHEV technology that actively combines batteries with ultracapacitors. The company asserts that the combination of high-power ultracapacitors, which prefer to discharge and recharge quickly, and high-energy lithium-ion batteries, which prefer to discharge and recharge slowly, makes for a system with both long-life and high energy-density storage.

== Prototype ==
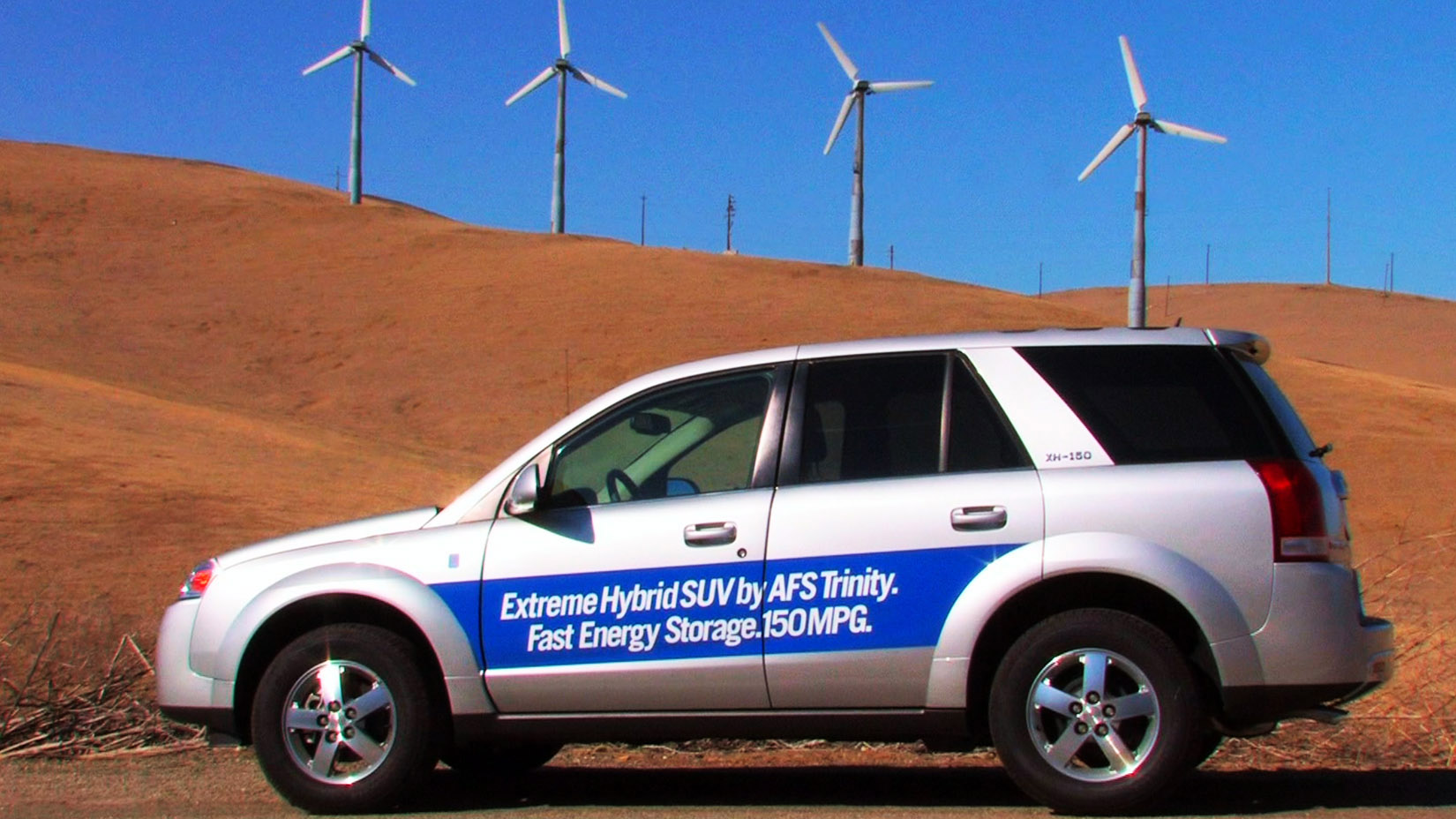
AFS Trinity's plug-in hybrid prototype at Altamont Pass near their Engineering Center in Livermore, California

AFS Trinity claims that this "Extreme Hybrid" technology makes it possible for plug-in hybrid electric vehicles to achieve the equivalent of 150 miles per US gallon (1.6 L/100 km; 180 mpg_{‑imp}), travel 40 miles (64 km) per charge in all-electric mode and use gasoline for additional range (limited by gasoline tank size) in hybrid mode. The company also reports that its prototype "XH-150S" modified Saturn Vue SUVs demonstrated 11.6 second 0-60 performance in electric-only mode and 6.9 second 0–60 performance in full hybrid mode, which would be comparable to a Porsche Cayenne.

== History ==
AFS Trinity was formed on December 5, 2000, through the combination of two predecessor companies, American Flywheel Systems, Inc. (AFS), incorporated in 1991, and Trinity Flywheel Power (Trinity) which was incorporated in 1993. Since 1991, AFS Trinity has conducted programs with private and government organizations including DARPA, NASA, the U.S. Navy, U.S. Army, U.S. DOT, California Energy Commission, Oak Ridge National Laboratories, Lawrence Livermore National Labs, Honeywell, Lockheed, and Ricardo plc.

On January 24, 2006, AFS Trinity and Ricardo signed a Technology Partnership Agreement for Ricardo to help integrate AFS Trinity's Extreme Hybrid drive train technology into passenger cars and SUVs. On January 27, 2008, the company unveiled two modified Saturn Vue SUVs (called XH-150 SUV) at the North American International Auto Show in Detroit.

On January 26, 2010, AFS Trinity demonstrated its prototypes for Delaware officials including Governor Jack Markell, suggesting that Delaware's idled factories and workforce could potentially mass-produce the vehicle.

== Technology ==
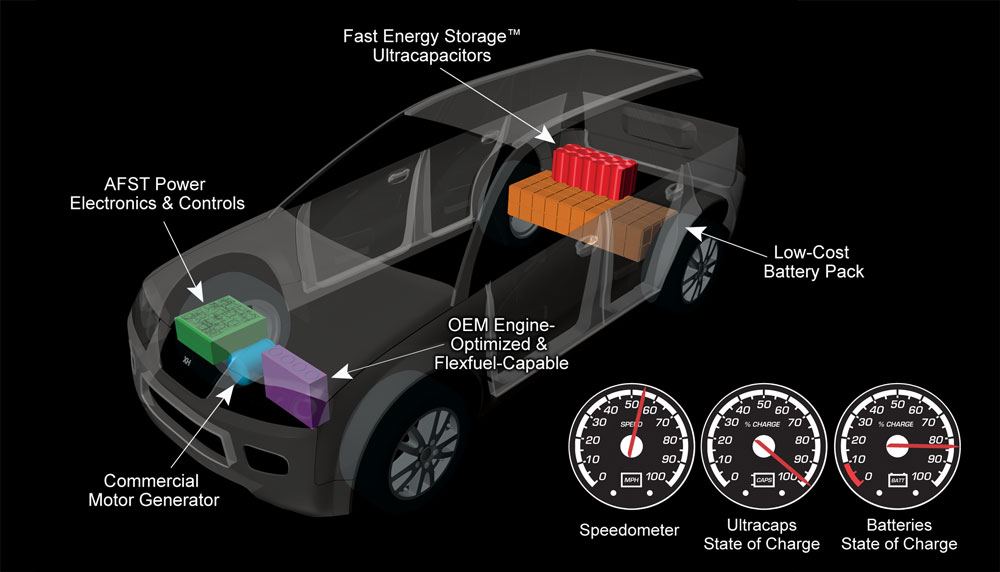
3D Cutaway of "Extreme Hybrid" Drive Train Technology as implemented in the XH-150 Plug-in Hybrid Prototype

The powertrain using two forms of energy storage is disclosed in US patent application 11/519,350.

The application describes a family of architectures where a battery is used in conjunction with a second energy storage device which may be an ultracapacitor, a flywheel, or a second battery. The purpose of the second energy storage device is to protect the battery from high current during high power operation.
