= VTi transmission =

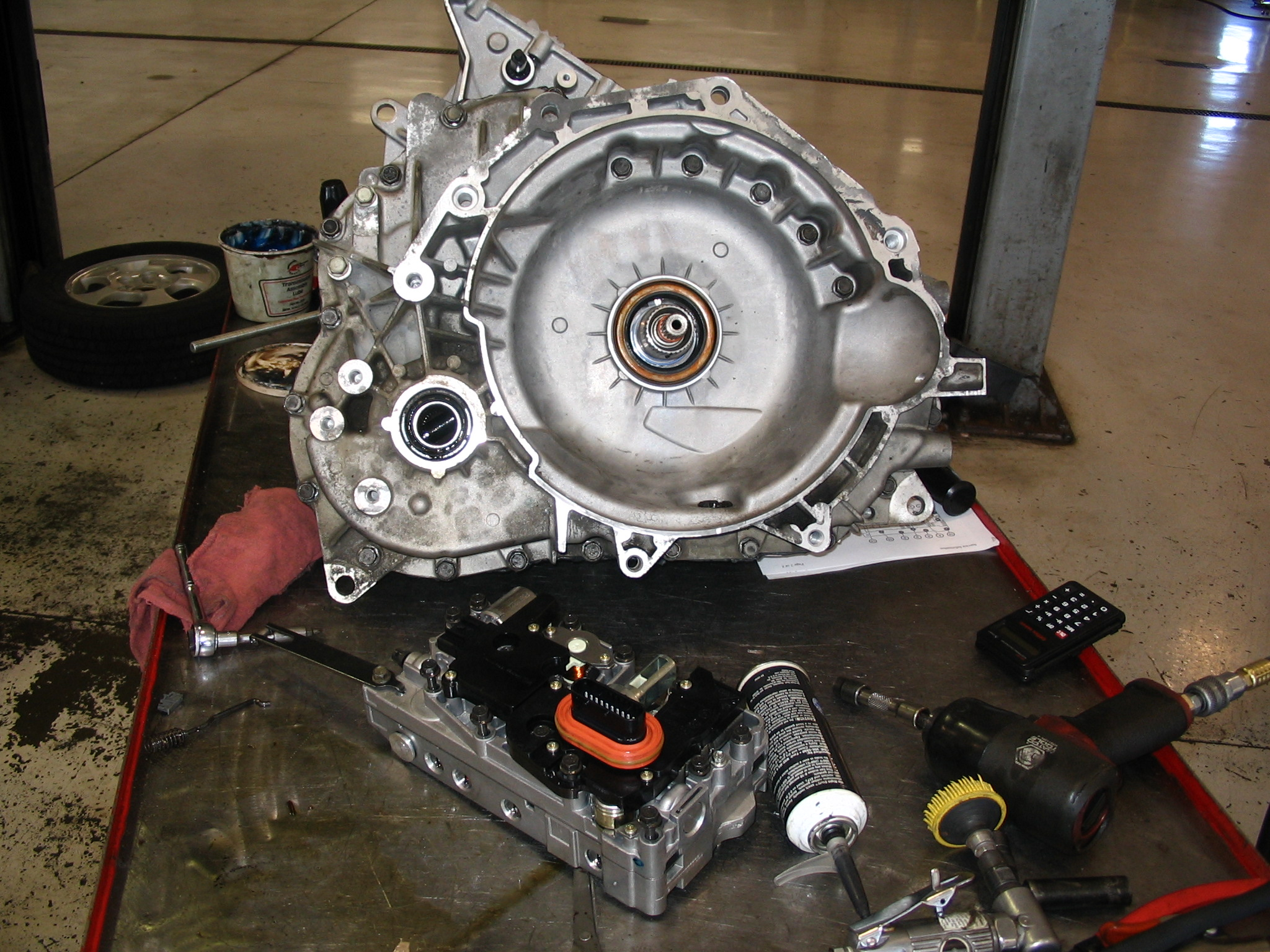
The VTi transmission from a Saturn Vue. The torque converter fits in the large round area.

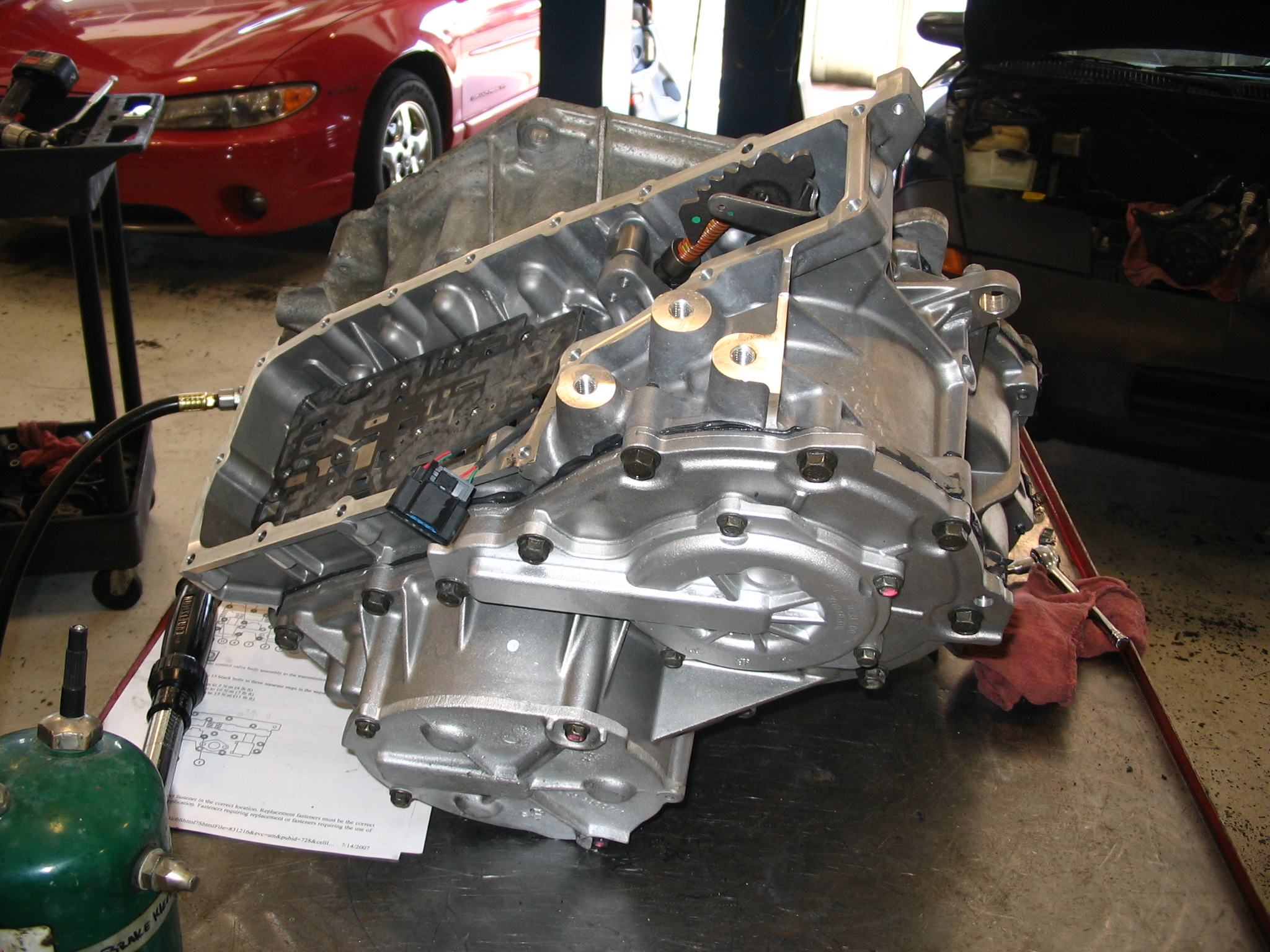
The same VTi transmission from the opposite side.

The VTi is a continuously variable transmission for automobiles. It is fully-automatic, electronically controlled, and designed for transverse front-wheel-drive use. The VTi is assembled at a General Motors / Fiat joint venture plant in Szentgotthárd, Hungary.

Quality issues delayed the introduction of the VTi until the second quarter of 2002. Production ended in 2005.

The VTi can handle a maximum of 200 N⋅m (150 lb⋅ft) of torque for vehicles weighing up to 2,100 kg (4,600 lb), with gear ranges from 2.61 to 0.44. A 2.15 reverse gear is also specified. The effective final drive ratio is 4.35.

It uses two sets of 12 steel bands (Van Doorne belts) inside a die-cast aluminum casing. GM claims that the CVT's bands, normally a weak spot in CVTs, are reliable for at least 100,000 mi (160,000 km). A 225 mm (8.9 in) torque converter is also used.

In 2004 GM extended the transmission's warranty on all 2002–2005 GM vehicles with the VTi to 5 years or 75,000 miles (121,000 km), due to high failure rates.

Applications:

- 2002–2005 Saturn Vue (GMT315)
- 2003–2004 Saturn Ion Quad Coupe
- 2002–2004 Opel Vectra C (under the name CVTronic)
