= BAS hybrid =

Automotive hybrid engine technology

BAS (belted alternator starter) is a category of automotive parallel hybrid technology that uses an electric motor to contribute power to the internal combustion engine's crankshaft via a serpentine belt. By mounting this motor generator unit in the conventional location traditionally used for the standard automotive alternator, it permits a low-cost method of adding mild hybrid capabilities such as start-stop, power assist, and mild levels of regenerative braking. BAS systems differ from other mild hybrid systems as they are not run off the vehicle's crankshaft.

== Toyota ==
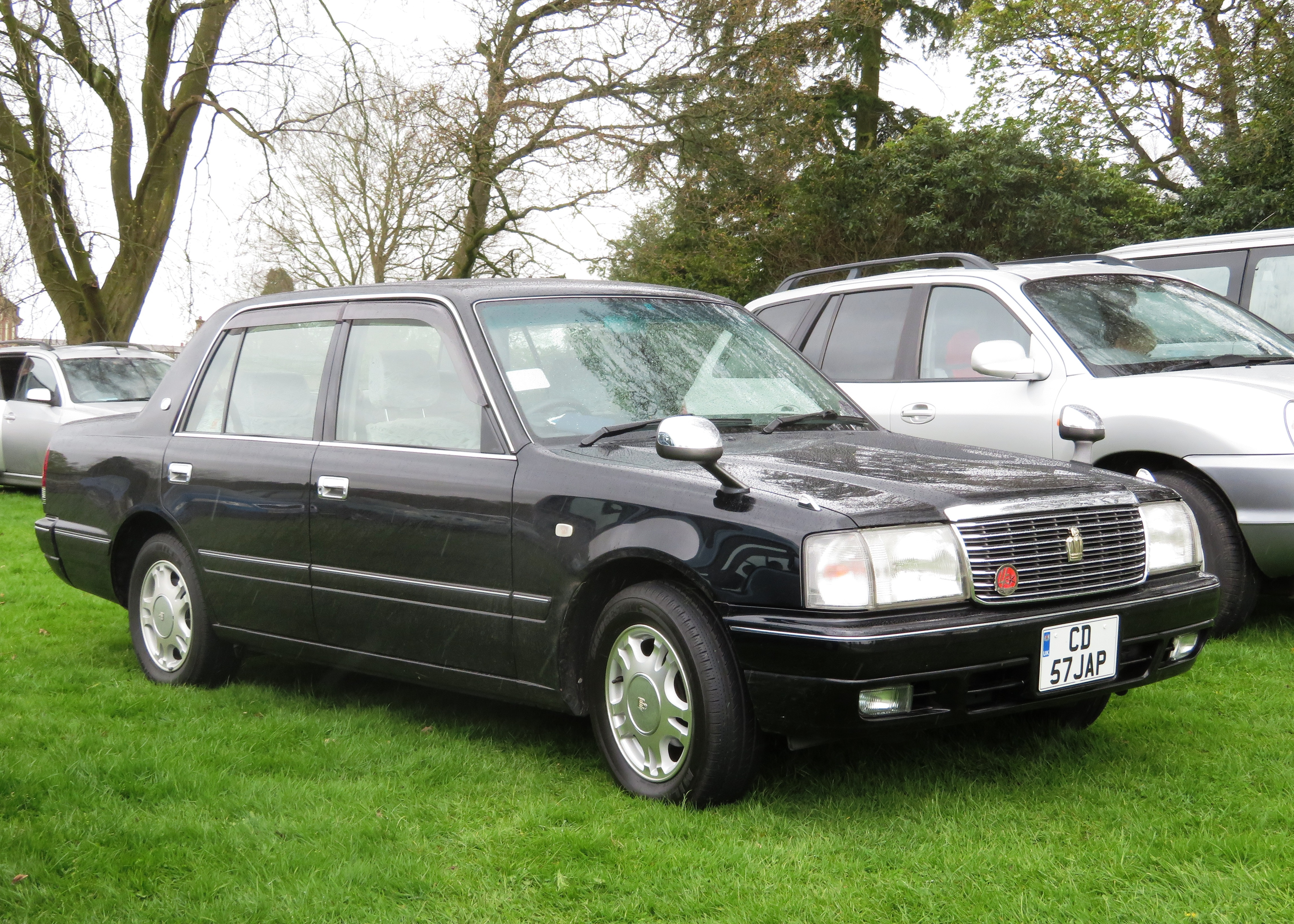
Toyota Crown Sedan Super Deluxe Mild Hybrid

In June 2001, Toyota introduced a BAS hybrid system under the Toyota Hybrid System-Mild (THS-M) brand name. It operates similarly to other mild hybrids with a start-stop system, in that it shuts down the engine as the vehicle comes to a stop and instantly restarts it when the brake pedal is released.

THS-M is capable of modest power assist during launch acceleration and similarly modest levels of "blended" regenerative braking during deceleration. A 36-volt lead–acid battery (housed in the vehicle's trunk and operating in a 42-volt electrical system) is used to operate a permanent magnet motor/generator unit mounted to the engine in a similar fashion to a conventional alternator. Then, through a high-tension drive belt, the motor/generator unit is capable of starting or assisting the engine. A conventional 12-volt battery and starter motor are retained and used whenever the engine is cold as during initial start-up.

Although unable to operate in pure all-electric EV mode, THS-M improves city and highway fuel efficiency over non-hybrid versions. According to Toyota, the system provides a 15% increase in fuel economy. The system is designed to be simple and easily adaptable across a wide range of vehicles, with no significant modifications required to the vehicle chassis to accommodate the system. This allows THS-M vehicles to be produced on the same assembly line as non-hybrid versions, producing substantial cost savings and allowing production to be adjusted more easily.

The first production model equipped with THS-M was the eleventh generation Toyota Crown Royal Saloon Mild Hybrid, introduced in August 2001, combining the system with a 3.0 L 2JZ-FSE straight-six engine. It was followed in October 2002 by the Toyota Crown Sedan Super Deluxe Mild Hybrid, which combines the system with a 2.0 L 1G-FE engine.

== General Motors ==
=== Generation I BAS ===
General Motors introduced a BAS hybrid system in the 2007 Saturn Vue Green Line. The BAS is in the 2008–2009 Chevrolet Malibu Hybrid. It operates on the same principle as Toyota's THS-M using a 36-volt electrical system (at 42–45 volts).

According to the EPA, the 2009 Saturn Vue BAS hybrid garners an improvement of 32% city (19>25mpg) and 24% highway (26>32mpg) making the combined economy improvement 27% (22>28mpg) over the base 4-cylinder FWD version. The system is reasonably simple and inexpensive, making BAS equipped vehicles some of the least expensive hybrids available.

Vehicles with the BAS system use a conventional 4T45-E automatic transmission which has been modified to include a more efficient final-drive ratio and includes an electrically driven pump to provide pressure in auto-stop mode. The air conditioning compressor continues to be operated through a belt-driven pulley, but for fuel economy improvement it can be disabled in auto-stop mode if the "ECO" A/C mode has been selected by the operator.

Cobasys, which supplies the BAS system's battery pack, had to conduct a recall in 2008 due to apparent internal leakage of the battery modules.

Citing supplier issues and slow sales, GM relegated the 2010 model year BAS hybrids to "fleet only" status.

=== Generation II BAS (eAssist) ===
At the LA Auto Show, on November 15, 2010, General Motors announced that it would be releasing an all-new version of the BAS system available in the 2012 Buick LaCrosse. While still a Belted Alternator Starter system, the system is named eAssist and includes a larger more powerful Hitachi-supplied 115-volt lithium-ion battery and a 11.2 kW (15.0 hp) motor-generator that delivers 79 lb⋅ft (107 N⋅m) of torque. The additional power provided by the more powerful battery and motor provides the ability to contribute more power, and more often able to electrically start and assist the 2.4L engine. The eAssist system also includes a specially modified GM 6T40 6-speed automatic FWD transaxle.

=== Generation III (BAS3) ===
A third generation was introduced in the 2016 Chevrolet Silverado/GMC Sierra and can improve fuel efficiency by about 13%. This adds about 100 lb (45 kg) to the total weight of the truck but provides an additional 13 hp (10 kW) and 44 lb⋅ft (60 N⋅m). The eAssist system includes a modified GM 8L90 automatic transmission. It uses the same battery cells from the Chevrolet Malibu Hybrid and the software is a modified version of the Chevrolet Volt's.

== Other names ==
- Belt-driven starter generator (BSG)
- Belt-driven integrated starter generator or belt mounted integrated starter generator (BISG or B-ISG)
- Belt-driven starter alternator or belted starter alternator (BSA)
- Dynastart

== Vehicles ==
- 2001–2003 Toyota Crown Royal Saloon Mild Hybrid
- 2002–2008 Toyota Crown Sedan Super Deluxe Mild Hybrid
- 2007–2009 Saturn Aura Green Line
- 2007–2009 Saturn Vue Green Line
- 2008–2010 Chevrolet Malibu Hybrid
- 2012–2014, 2018-2019 Buick LaCrosse with eAssist
- 2012–2014 Buick Regal with eAssist
- 2013-14 Chevrolet Malibu with eAssist
- 2014 Chevrolet Impala with eAssist
- 2016 Chevrolet Silverado/GMC Sierra with eAssist, only in California
- 2017 Audi A8
- 2017 Audi A7
- 2019-2020 Jeep Wrangler with eTorque
- 2019 Ram 1500 with eTorque
- 2022 Jeep Wagoneer with eTorque
- 2022 Jeep Grand Cherokee with eTorque
- 2021 FIAT 500 Hybrid and FIAT Panda Hybrid, with BSG (Belt-integrated Starter Generator)
- 2023-2024 Audi Q5 45 TFSI (12V MHEV)

== See also ==
- Integrated starter generator
- Parallel Hybrid Truck
- Two-Mode Hybrid
