= Saturn Vue =

American compact crossover SUV

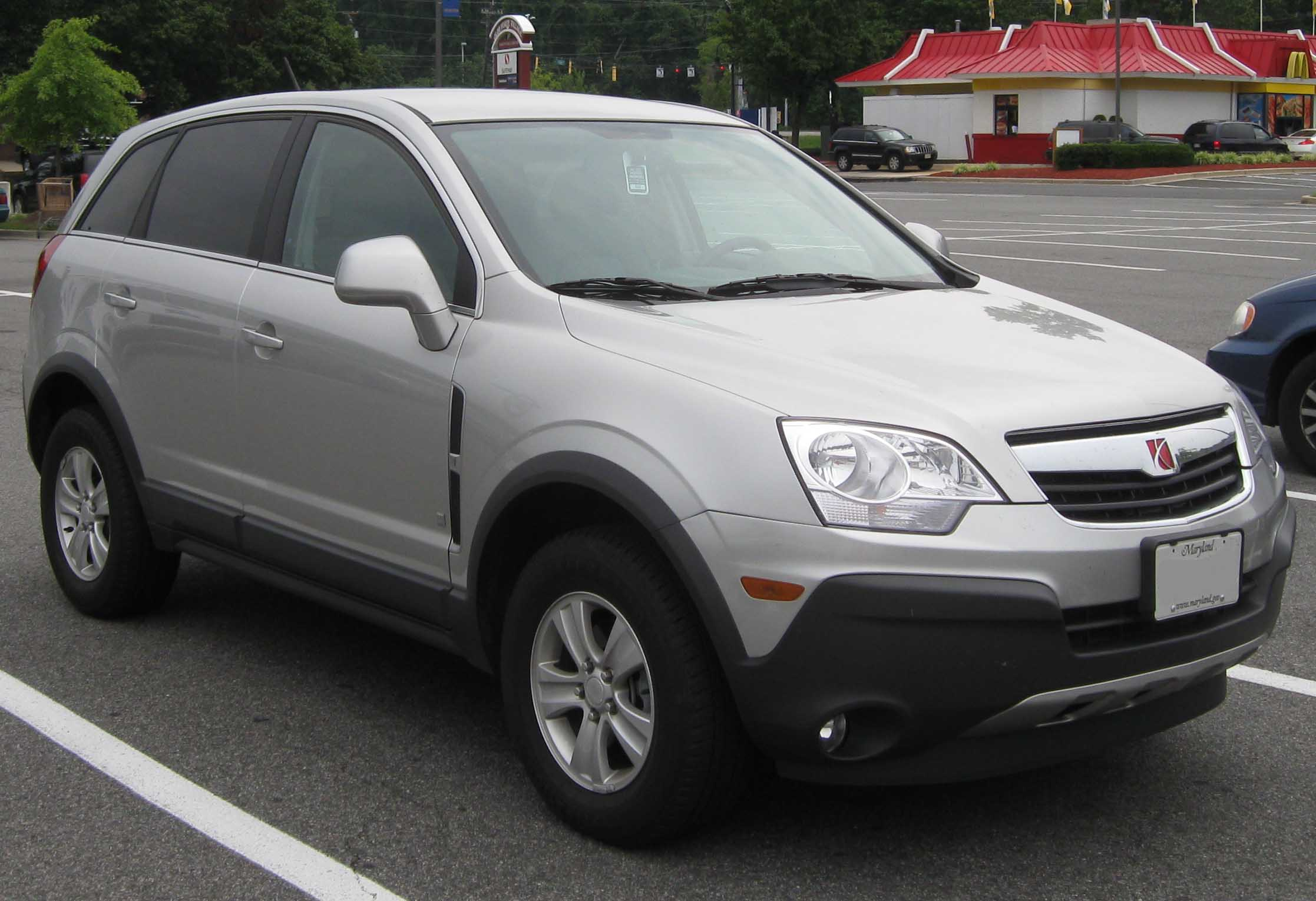

Overview
- Manufacturer: Saturn Corporation (2002–2007); Opel (General Motors) (2008–2010)
- Production: 2001–2009
- Model years: 2002–2010

Body and chassis
- Class: Compact SUV (2002–2007); Compact crossover SUV (2008–2010)
- Body style: 5-door SUV
- Layout: Transverse front-engine, front-wheel drive / all-wheel drive
- Platform: Theta
- Related: Pontiac Torrent; Chevrolet Equinox; Suzuki XL7

Chronology
- Predecessor: Isuzu Rodeo (Canada); Geo/Chevrolet Tracker
- Successor: Chevrolet Captiva Sport

The Saturn Vue is a compact SUV that was built and marketed by Saturn, and was their best-selling model. It was the first vehicle to use the GM Theta platform, introduced in 2001 for the 2002 model year. The Vue was facelifted for the 2006 model year. A second generation model was launched in 2007 for the 2008 model year as a rebadged Opel Antara.

Production of the Vue in North America ended when GM discontinued the Saturn brand as part of its 2009 Chapter 11 reorganization.

== First generation (2002) ==
First generation
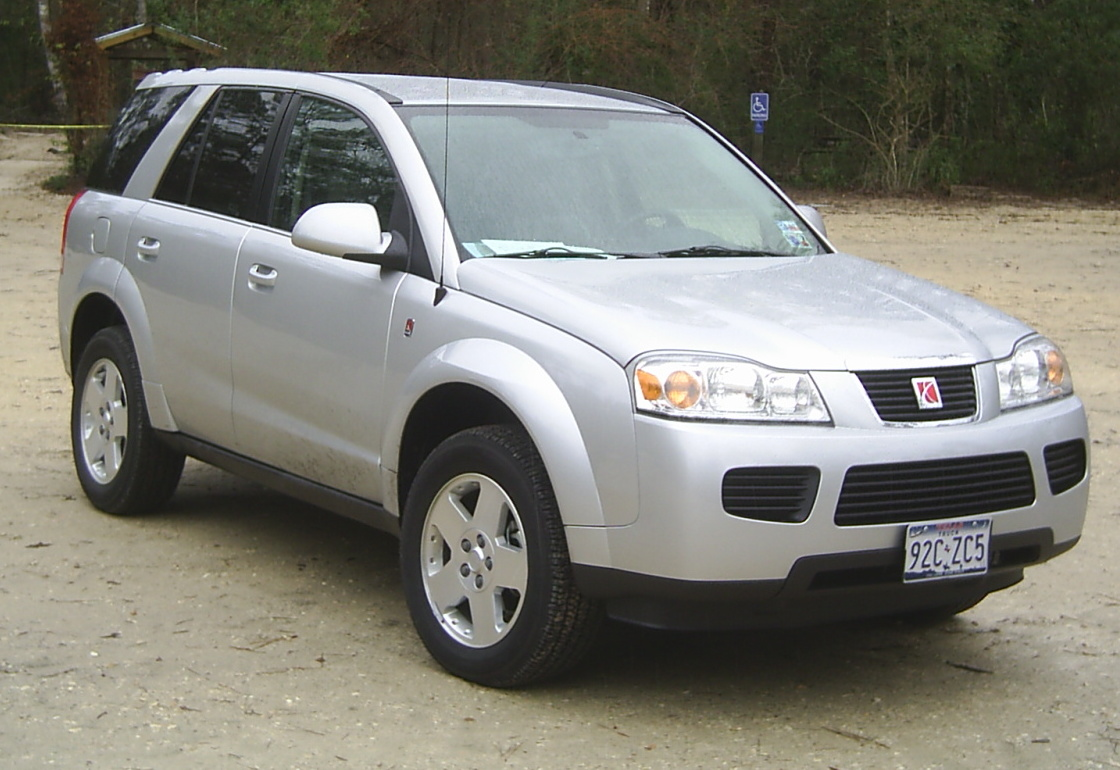
- Facelift model (2007)

Overview
- Production: 2001–2007
- Model years: 2002–2007
- Assembly: United States: Spring Hill, Tennessee (Spring Hill Manufacturing)

Body and chassis
- Class: Compact SUV
- Body style: 5-door SUV
- Platform: GM Theta platform/GMT315

Powertrain
- Engine: 2.2 L L61 I4 (gasoline); 2.4 L LAT (mild hybrid gasoline/electric); 3.0 L L81 V6 (gasoline); 3.5 L L66 V6 (gasoline)
- Electric motor: 15-kW motor generator
- Transmission: 4-speed GM 4T45-E automatic; 5-speed Aisin AF33 automatic; 5-speed Honda H5 automatic; 5-speed Getrag F23 manual; CVT VTi automatic
- Hybrid drivetrain: eAssist
- Battery: 36-volt nickel-metal hydride (NiMH)

Dimensions
- Wheelbase: 106.6 in (2,708 mm)
- Length: 181.3 in (4,605 mm)
- Width: 71.5 in (1,816 mm); Hybrid: 71.6 in (1,819 mm)
- Height: 66.5 in (1,689 mm); Hybrid: 66.3 in (1,684 mm)

The Vue was designed by Saturn and introduced for the 2002 model year. It was manufactured at the Spring Hill GM plant. Its unibody platform is shared with the Chevrolet Equinox, Pontiac Torrent, and the European Opel Antara. The first generation was produced for the 2002 to 2007 model years.

The Vue was produced in trim levels with an I4 or V6 gasoline engine and a manual or automatic transmission. A sport-oriented "Red Line" trim was added starting with the 2004 model year. An economy-oriented "Green Line" (mild hybrid) was added for the final model year of the first-generation Vue (2007). Front-wheel drive (FWD) and all-wheel drive (AWD) drivetrains were offered.

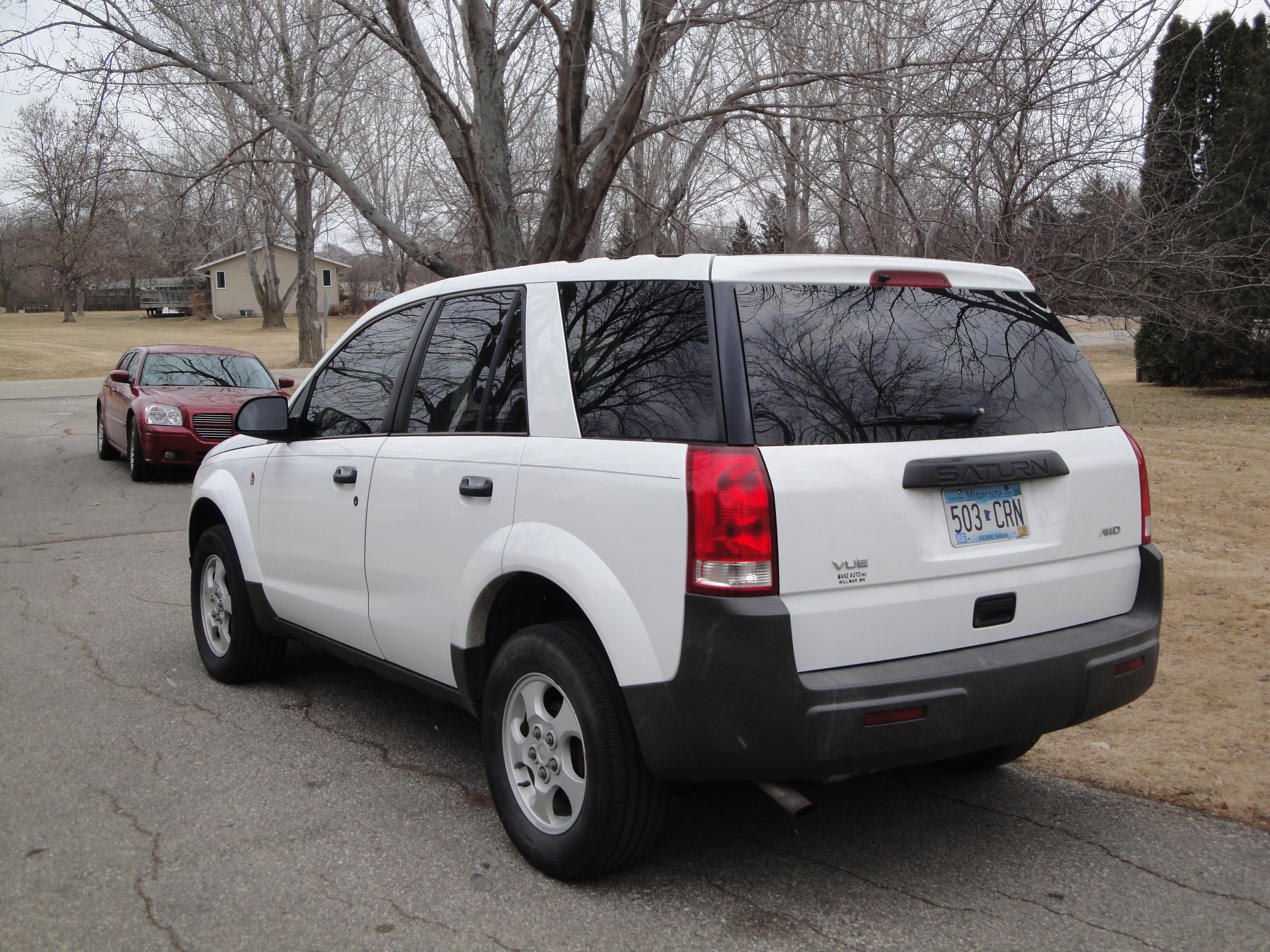
2003 Saturn Vue rear

Four-cylinder Vues use the Ecotec I4. The L81 V6 from the L-Series and the five-speed Aisin AF33 automatic transmission were initially offered, but starting in 2004, all six-cylinder Vues were equipped with Honda's 250-horsepower (190 kW) J35A3 engine and a Honda transmission. The four-cylinder Vue was available with the VTi continuously variable transmission (CVT) until GM halted production of it January 6, 2024, due to reported problems in high-milage testing. The transmission's poor reliability was later settled after a class action lawsuit.

The Vue received a facelift for the 2006 model year. Upgrades included a redesigned interior with higher-quality materials, a new bumper and grille, and minor changes to exterior trim. OnStar, cruise control, and automatic headlights became standard. However, General Motors (GM) "Mark of Excellence" badges were not added to the side of the vehicle until GM took over production from Saturn for the second-generation Vue.

=== Model year changes ===
- 2003:

The FWD V6 configuration was offered through part of the model year. This version included the L81 V6 engine with Aisin AF33 five-speed automatic transmission.

- 2004:

The Vue "Red Line" trim was added. The V6 models featured the Honda 3.5 L J35S1 engine and a Honda five-speed transmission. This combination improved performance over the prior V6. The Honda V6 engine was used in the Saturn Vue through the 2007 model year.

- 2005:

The I4 front-wheel drive configuration included a four-speed automatic transmission in place of the continuously variable transmission (CVT). The AWD I4 configuration with the CVT was available for the 2005 model year until the existing stock was depleted. Exterior colors Storm Grey, Pacific Blue, and Dragonfly Green were added. Electric Blue, Electric Lime, and Rainforest Green are discontinued.

- 2006:

Facelift with redesigned interior, including a new center console, center stack, and upgraded interior trim. New audio options received aux in and satellite radio. New front and rear fascias. Fusion Orange exterior color was added.

- 2007:

"Green Line" model added. Fusion Orange exterior color dropped, while Deep Blue color replaced Pacific Blue.

=== Red Line ===
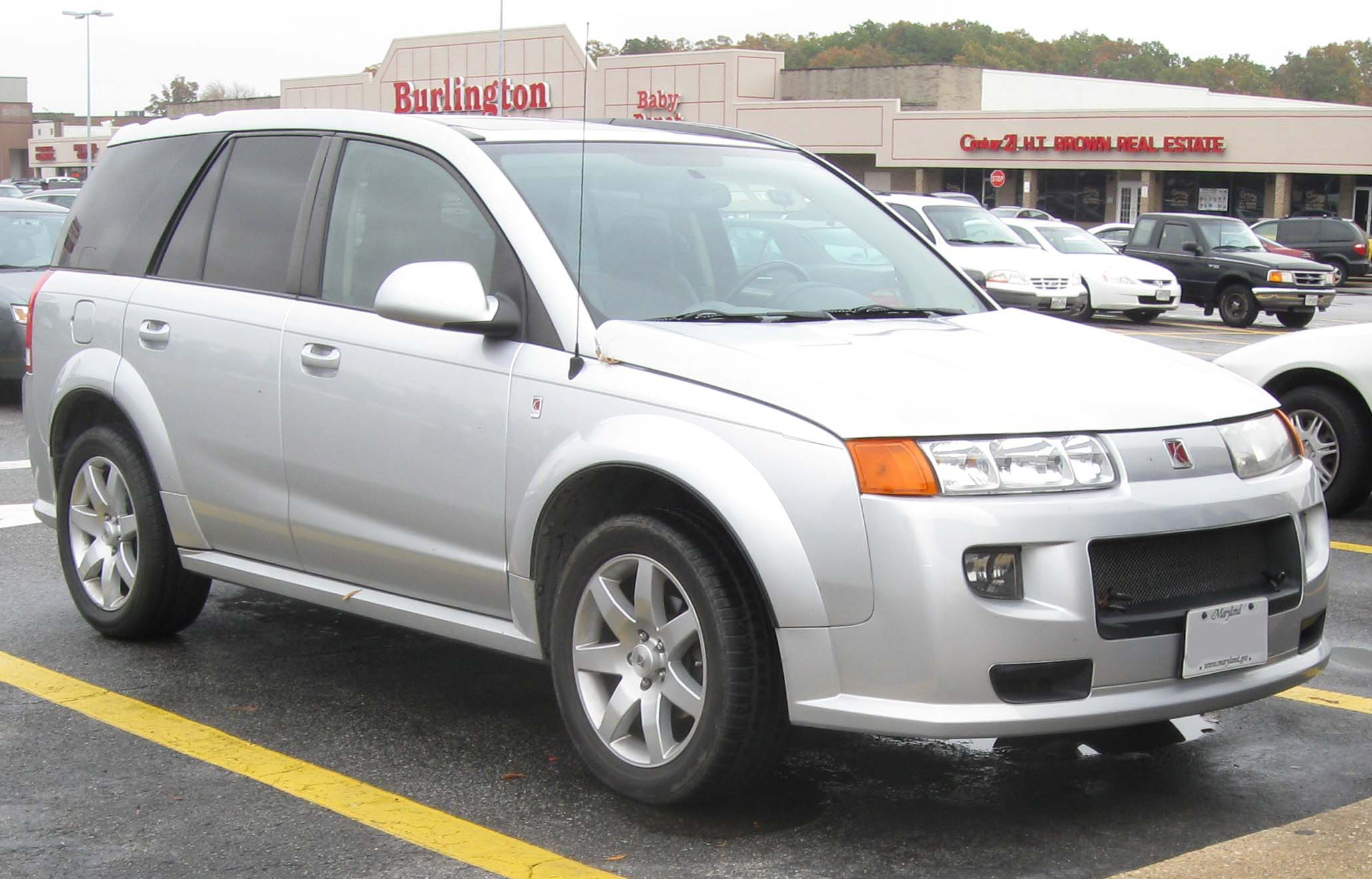
2004–2005 Saturn Vue Red Line

Saturn introduced a high-performance "Red Line" trim in 2004 with contents similar to those on the Ion models. This included the same 250 hp (186 kW) Honda J35A3 V6 as the regular model, but with suspension tuning that lowered the body by 1 inch, unique power steering calibration, 18 inch alloy wheels, ground-effect front and rear bumpers, unique rocker panel trim, chrome exhaust tip, special black leather and suede seats (optional for 2005, but standard for 2006 and 2007), footwell lighting (included with leather and suede seat package, not available with optional full-leather (heated front) seats), and a special gauge cluster. It also includes some unique interior features such as a higher quality audio system.

=== Green Line ===
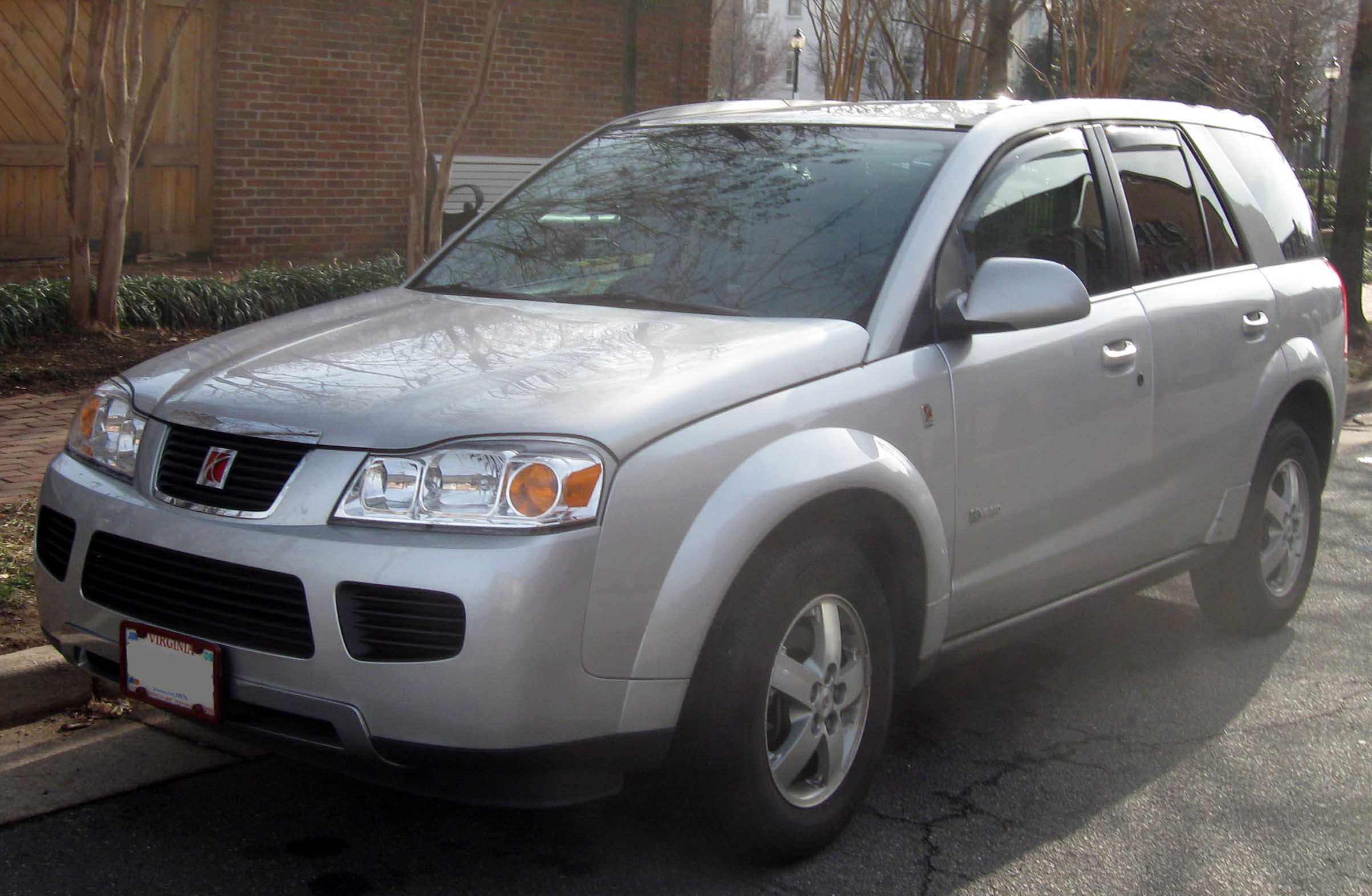
Saturn Vue Green Line

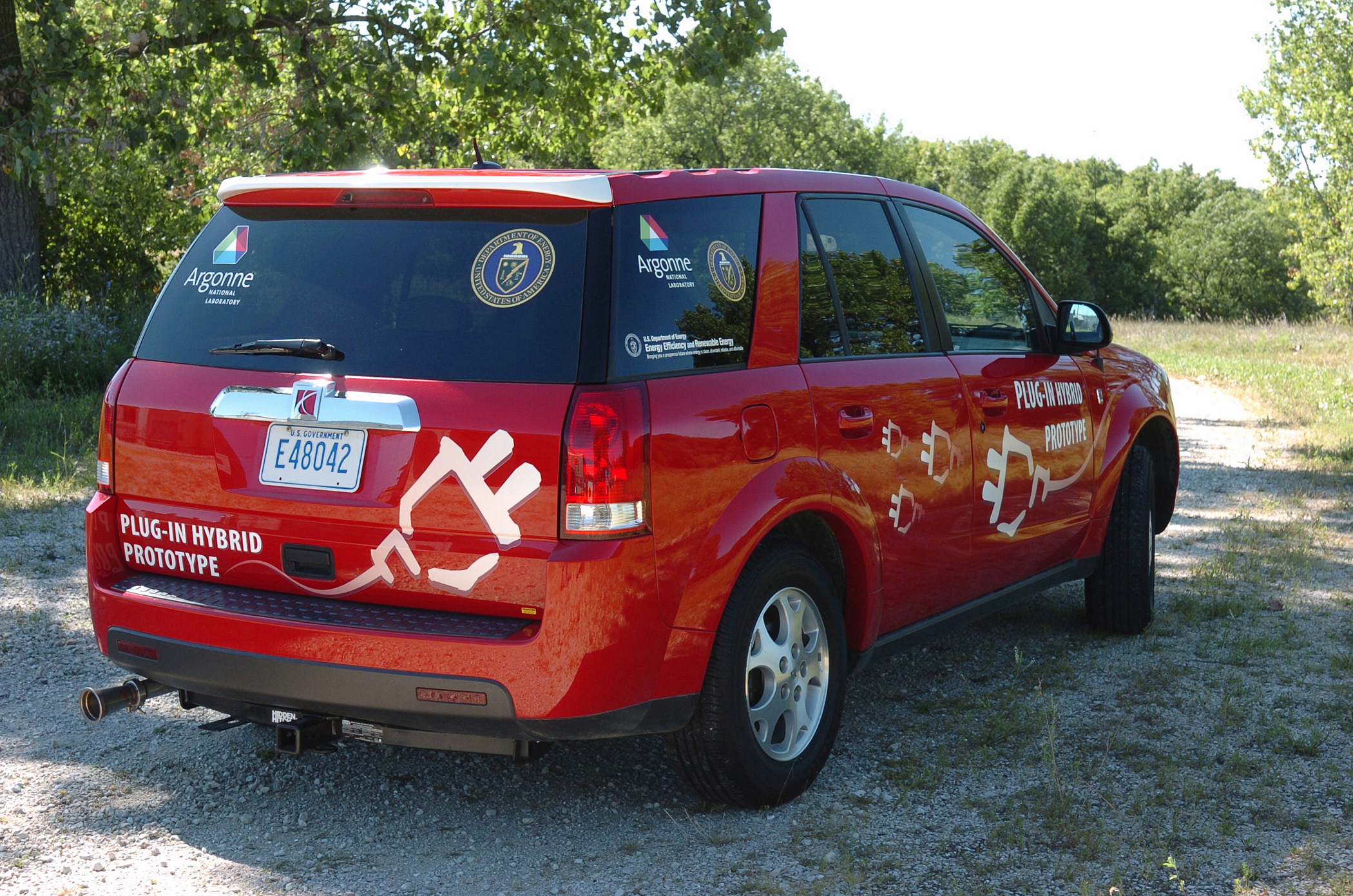
Saturn Vue Green Line rear

The high-performance Vue Red Line was joined in 2007 by the "Green Line" model. The Green Line was a mild hybrid, or "assist hybrid", using GM's belt alternator starter (BAS) system. An electric motor connected to the crankshaft via a special accessory drive belt, and the Green Line included a modified automatic transmission.

The start-stop system automatically stops the engine when the vehicle halts and instantly restarts it when the brake pedal is released. The electric motor assists somewhat during initial launch, providing torque smoothing, and during heavy acceleration. A 36-volt nickel metal hydride (NiMH) battery pack, located under the load floor, powers the BAS and stores energy from regenerative braking. The regenerative braking, charging, and electric motor assist functions are shown to the driver via an analog gauge on the dashboard, and real-time fuel economy feedback is provided via an "eco" light that glows when the instantaneous fuel economy exceeds the published window sticker fuel economy rating.

The fuel savings are up 20% from the base vehicle's 22 mpg_{‑US} (11 L/100 km)/27 mpg_{‑US} (8.7 L/100 km) city/highway EPA sticker to 27 mpg_{‑US} (8.7 L/100 km)/32 mpg_{‑US} (7.4 L/100 km).

In Canada, according to Saturn, the Vue achieved an estimated 8.8 L/100 km (32 mpg_{‑imp}; 27 mpg_{‑US}) city and 6.7 L/100 km (42 mpg_{‑imp}; 35 mpg_{‑US}) highway.

The Green Line has a 170 hp (127 kW) 2.4 L Ecotec DOHC-phaser engine, which replaced the standard 144-horsepower (107 kW) 2.2 L I4 engine. The 0–60 mph (0–97 km/h) acceleration time was improved by 1.0 second. Pricing for the hybrid was about US$2,000 more than a similarly equipped Vue, and it debuted in production form on January 8, 2006, at the North American International Auto Show in Detroit. The Green Line went on sale in the third quarter of 2006.

=== Engines ===
Years	Engine	Power	Torque
2002–2007	2.2 L Ecotec L61 I4	143 hp (107 kW; 145 PS)	152 lb⋅ft (206 N⋅m)
2002–2003	3.0 L L81 54-Degree V6	181 hp (135 kW; 184 PS)	195 lb⋅ft (264 N⋅m)
2004–2007	3.5 L GM L66 (J35S1) V6	250 hp (186 kW; 253 PS)	242 lb⋅ft (328 N⋅m)

=== Transmissions (first generation) ===
Years	Transmission	Type	Configuration	RPO Code
2002–2007	5-Speed Getrag F23	Manual	FWD	MG3
2002–2003	5-Speed Aisin AF33	Automatic	FWD/AWD	M09 (FWD 6), M45 (AWD 6)
2002–2005	VTi VT25-E CVT	Automatic	FWD/AWD	M75 (FWD 4), M16 (AWD 4)
2005–2007	4-Speed GM 4T45-E	Automatic	FWD	MN5
2004–2007	5-Speed Honda H5	Automatic	FWD/AWD	MJ7 (FWD 6), MJ8 (AWD 6)

=== Safety ===
In Insurance Institute for Highway Safety (IIHS) crash tests, the Vue receives a "good" overall rating in the frontal offset crash test. In 2008, models came equipped with standard front and rear head side curtain airbags and front seat-mounted torso airbags. These models received an "acceptable" overall rating for side impacts. Models without side airbags were given an overall "poor" rating.

== Second generation (2008) ==
Second generation
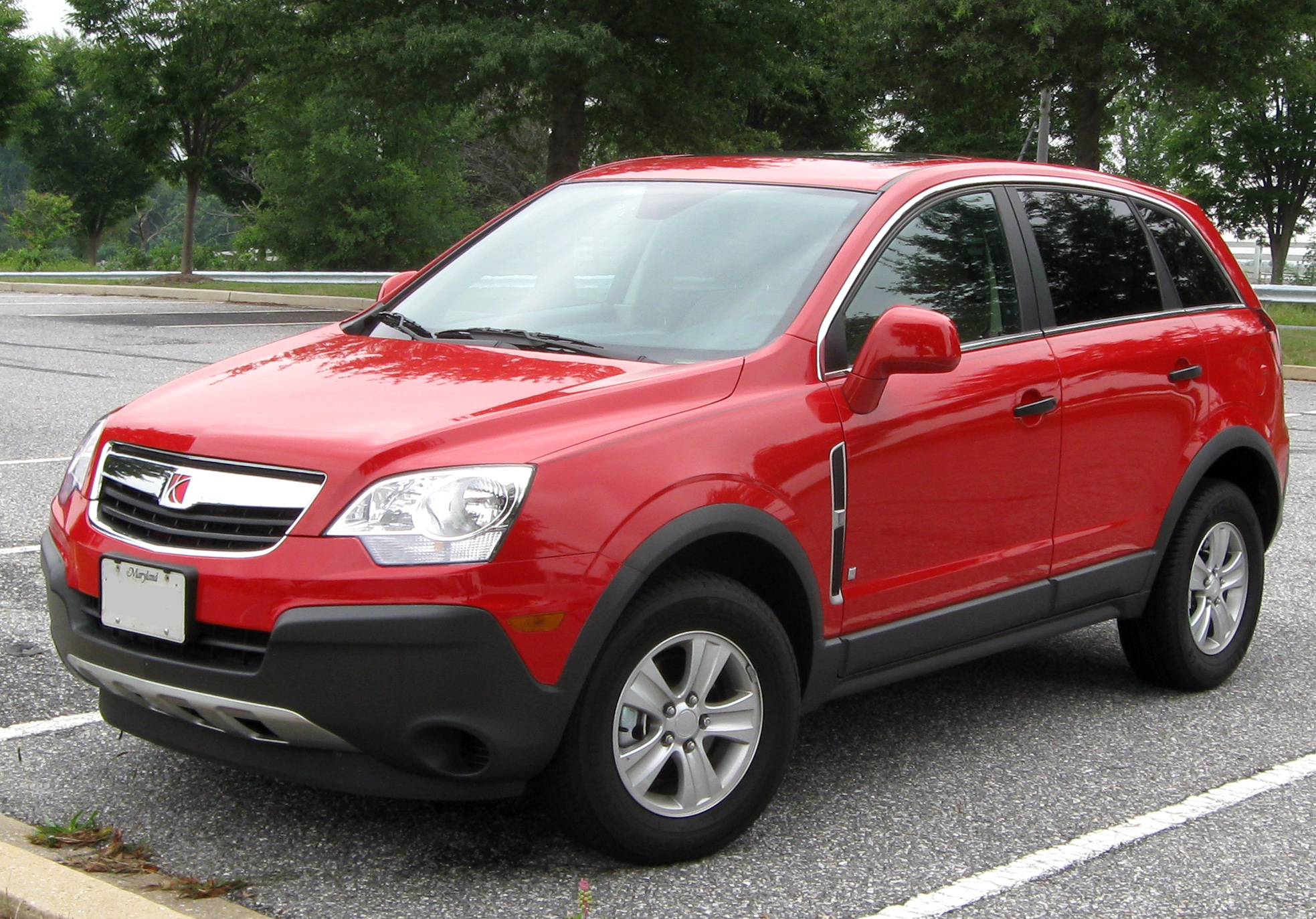

Overview
- Manufacturer: Opel (General Motors)
- Also called: Opel Antara; Vauxhall Antara; Holden Captiva 5 GMC Terrain (Middle East); Daewoo Winstorm MaXX; Chevrolet Captiva Sport
- Production: 2007–2009
- Model years: 2008–2010
- Assembly: Mexico: Ramos Arizpe

Body and chassis
- Class: Compact SUV
- Body style: 5-door SUV
- Platform: GM Theta platform/GMT319
- Related: Chevrolet Captiva Sport

Powertrain
- Engine: Petrol/gasoline: 2.4 L LE5 I4; 3.5 L LZ4 V6 Petrol/gasoline Hybrid: 2.4 L LAT I4 eAssist
- Electric motor: 15-kW motor generator
- Transmission: 4-speed 4T45-E automatic; 6-speed 6T70 automatic
- Hybrid drivetrain: eAssist (Hybrid)
- Battery: 36-volt nickel-metal hydride (NiMH)

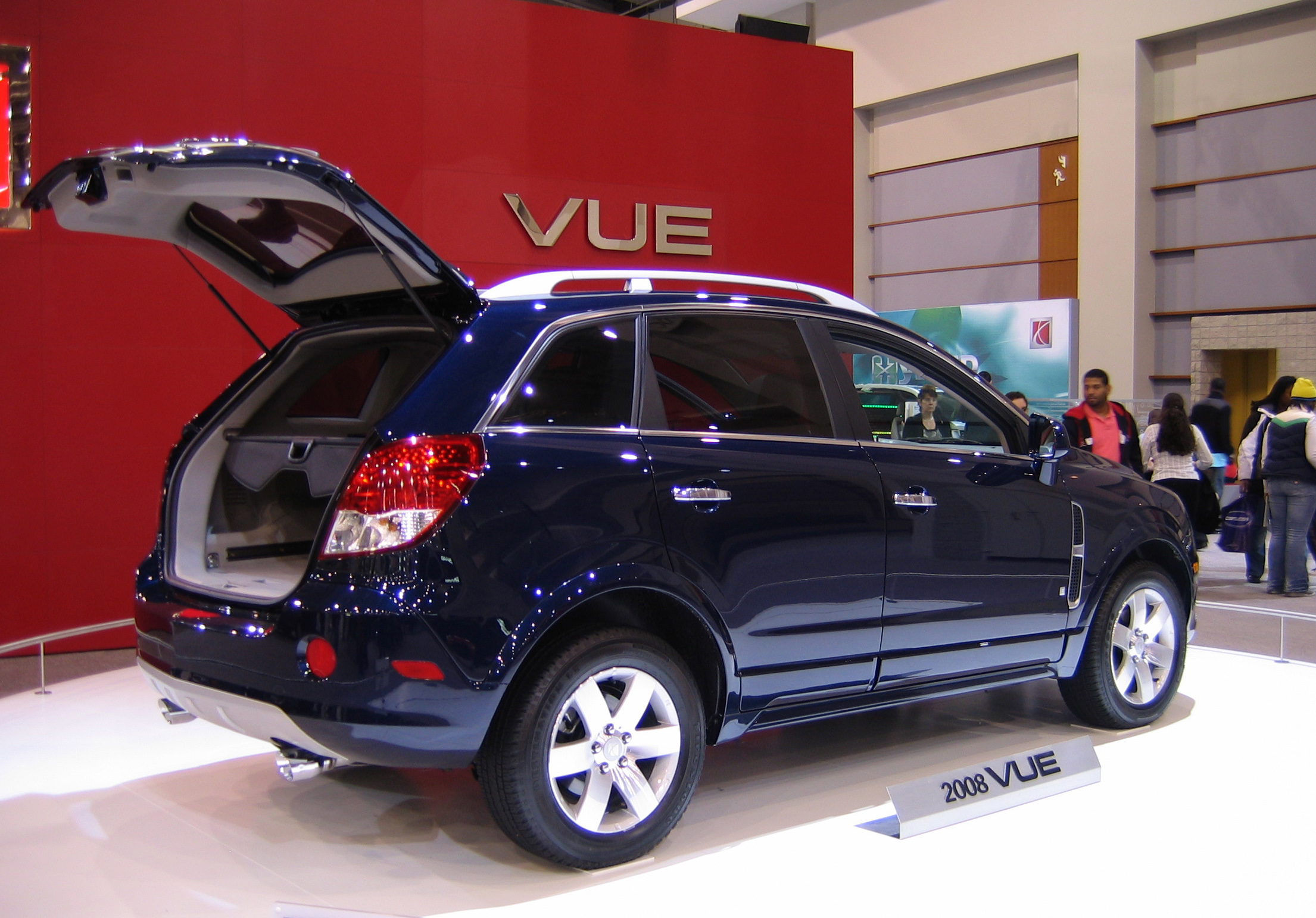
Saturn Vue rear

Saturn introduced the second generation Vue in 2007 for the 2008 model year, manufactured at Ramos Arizpe Assembly in Mexico as a rebranded version of the German-designed Opel Antara. The front end featured a large chrome trim on the grille with "teardrop-shaped" headlights. The roof sloped downward to an angled rear hatch. GM badges were featured on the front doors.

2008

The 2008 Vue was available in four trim levels: base XE, midgrade XR, top-of-the-line Red Line, and a Green Line hybrid. The XE included 16-inch wheels, body-colored door handles, and side mirrors. The XR trim added chrome door handles, chrome-tipped dual exhaust, and 17-inch alloy wheels.

Engine options included a 2.4 L I4, hybrid 2.4 L I4, 3.5 L V6, or a 3.6 L V6. The V6 versions of the Vue come with conventional hydraulic power steering, replacing the previous electric assist; however, the I4-powered cars continued with electric power.

The Mexican-manufactured Vue was also marketed in Mexico and South America as the Chevrolet Captiva Sport, with only badges changed and a new grille insert.

2009

Three trim levels: base XE, midgrade XR, and Red Line. The XE included 16-inch alloy wheels, keyless entry, a tilt steering wheel with audio controls and cruise control, a height-adjustable driver seat, and a CD/MP3 stereo with satellite radio. The XR added 17-inch alloy wheels, luggage rack rails, automatic climate control, a power driver seat, a leather-wrapped steering wheel, Bluetooth, and heated side mirrors. The Red Line featured 18-inch alloy wheels, a lowered suspension, a roof-mounted spoiler, chrome exhaust tips, and heated front seats with leather and suede upholstery.

2010

2010 Saturn Vue was available in two trims, the base XE and the XR. Both versions were available with an I4 or V6 engine and either front- or all-wheel drive.

The Vue Hybrid was equipped similarly to the XE Preferred package and available only with front-wheel drive powered by the 2.4 L I4 gas/electric engine with a four-speed automatic transmission.

Saturn Vue (second generation) powertrains
Engine	Specifications			Transmission	Trim(s)				Year(s)
Engine	Power	Torque	Consumption (City/Hwy)	Transmission	XE	XR	Red Line	Green Line / Hybrid	Year(s)
2.4 L LE5 I4	169 hp (126 kW) @6200	161 lb⋅ft (218 N⋅m) @5100	19 / 26 mpg_{‑US} (12.4 / 9.0 l/100 km)	4-spd AT	FWD	FWD	—N/a	—N/a	2008, 2009, 2010
2.4 L LAT BAS hybrid I4	172 hp (128 kW) @6200	167 lb⋅ft (226 N⋅m) @5100	25 / 32 mpg_{‑US} (9.4 / 7.4 l/100 km)	4-spd AT	—N/a	—N/a	—N/a	FWD	2008, 2009, 2010
3.5 L LZ4 V6	222 hp (166 kW) @5900	219 lb⋅ft (297 N⋅m) @3200	16 / 23 mpg_{‑US} (15 / 10 l/100 km)	6-spd AT	AWD	—N/a	—N/a	—N/a	2008, 2009, 2010
3.6 L LY7 V6	257 hp (192 kW) @6500	248 lb⋅ft (336 N⋅m) @2100	17 / 24 mpg_{‑US} (13.8 / 9.8 l/100 km) FWD; 16 / 23 mpg_{‑US} (15 / 10 l/100 km) AWD	6-spd AT	—N/a	FWD/ AWD	FWD/ AWD	—N/a	2008, 2009, 2010
3.6 L LCS V6	262 hp (195 kW) @6100	250 lb⋅ft (340 N⋅m) @4800	28 / 31 mpg_{‑US} (8.4 / 7.6 l/100 km) (est)	2-Mode hybrid 4-spd / eCVT	—N/a	—N/a	—N/a	FWD	planned 2009; cancelled

== Discontinuation ==
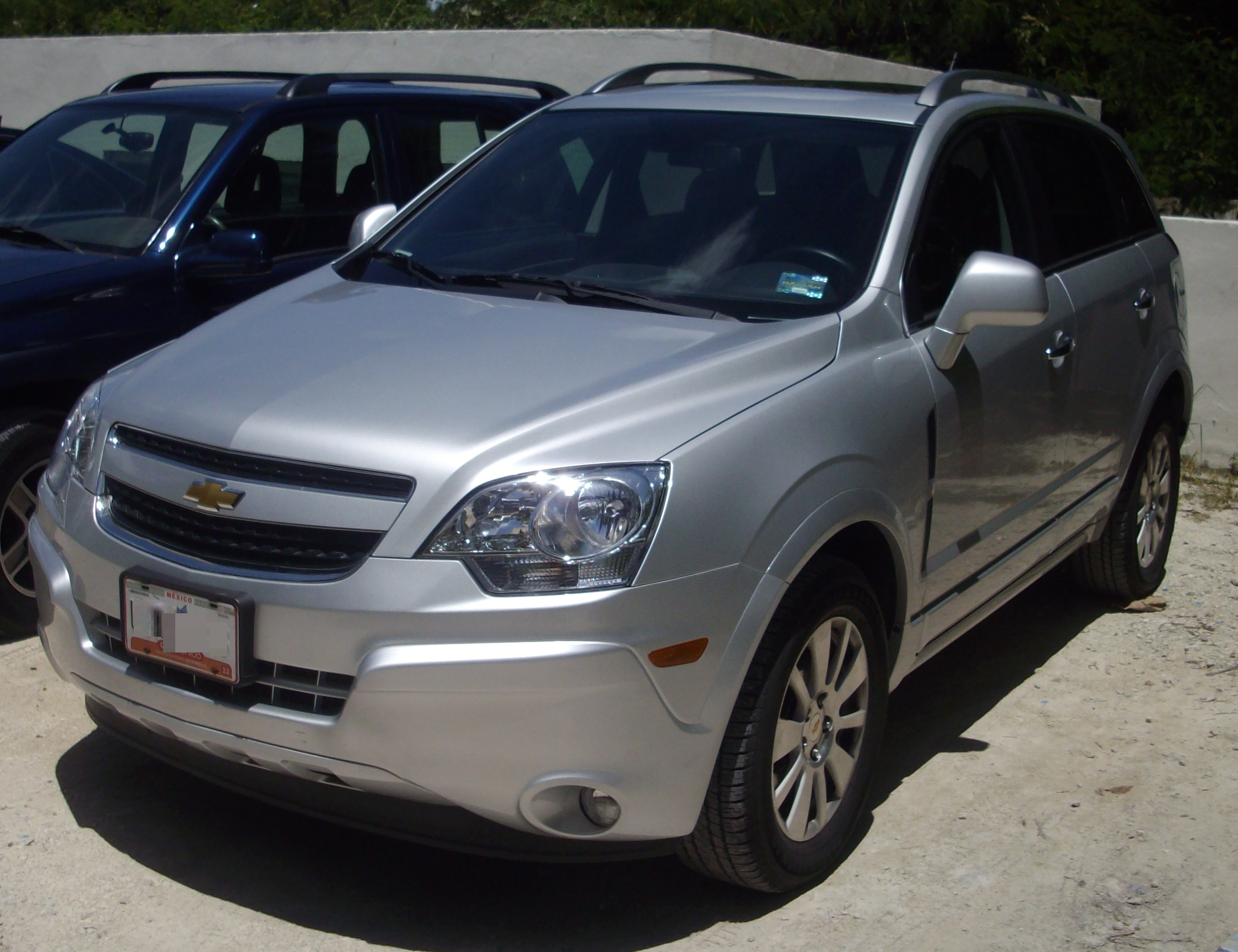
Chevrolet Captiva Sport in Quintana Roo, Mexico

Following the end of the Saturn brand in 2009 for the 2010 model year, the Vue was discontinued. However, GM continued to produce the Chevrolet Captiva Sport, a rebadged Saturn Vue, for the Mexican and South American markets until 2015.

For the U.S. market, the Chevrolet Captiva Sport was imported from Ramos Arizpe and sold to commercial and fleet customers starting from late 2011 (for the 2012 model year) until U.S. imports ended in 2014.

== Sales ==
Calendar year	United States
2001	393
2002	75,478
2003	81,924
2004	86,957
2005	91,972
2006	88,581
2007	81,676
2008	84,767
2009	28,429
2010	3,201
