= Chevrolet Captiva =

Compact crossover SUV

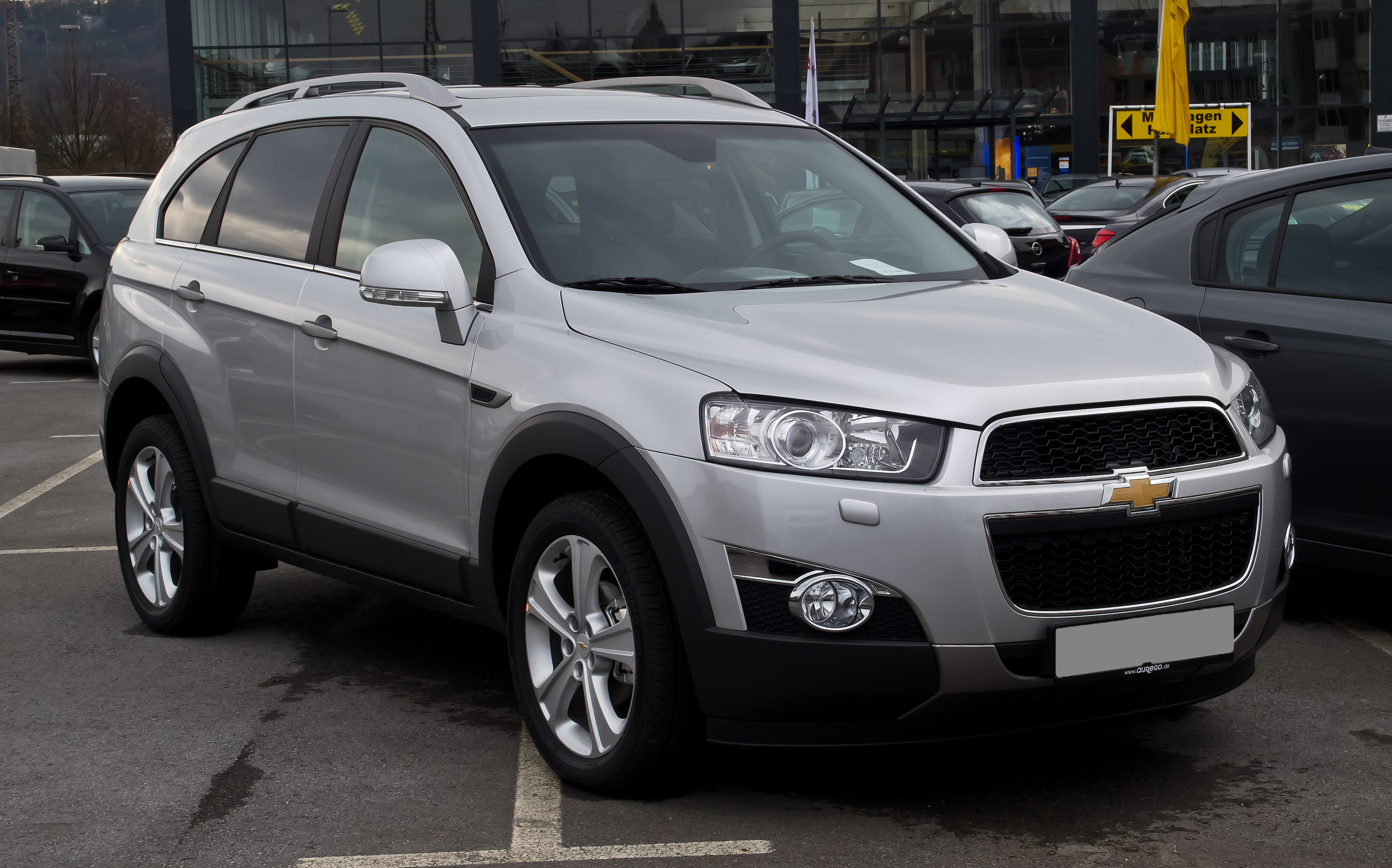

Overview
- Manufacturer: General Motors; SAIC-GM-Wuling (2019–present)
- Production: 2006–present

Body and chassis
- Class: Compact crossover SUV
- Body style: 5-door SUV

Chronology
- Predecessor: Holden Adventra (Australia); Holden Frontera (Australia); Chevrolet Forester (India); Chevrolet Trooper

The Chevrolet Captiva is a compact crossover SUV marketed by General Motors. The first generation was developed by GM Korea, based on the GM Theta platform and derived from the S3X concept car revealed in 2004. Released in 2006, it was sold internationally as the Chevrolet Captiva, in Australia and New Zealand as the Holden Captiva and in South Korea as the Daewoo Winstorm prior to the adoption of its international name in 2011, when the Daewoo brand was discontinued. The vehicle shares much its underpinnings with the similarly-styled Opel/Vauxhall Antara / second-generation Saturn Vue, with the Captiva offering optional third-row seating.

In 2018, Chevrolet ended production of the first-generation Captiva and began replacing it worldwide with the Equinox. The second-generation Captiva, which is a rebadged Baojun 530 produced in China by SAIC-GM-Wuling, was introduced in Colombia in November 2018 and Thailand in March 2019. The second-generation model is also offered in many Latin American markets, including Mexico since 2021.

== First generation (C100, C140; 2006) ==
First generation (C100/C140)
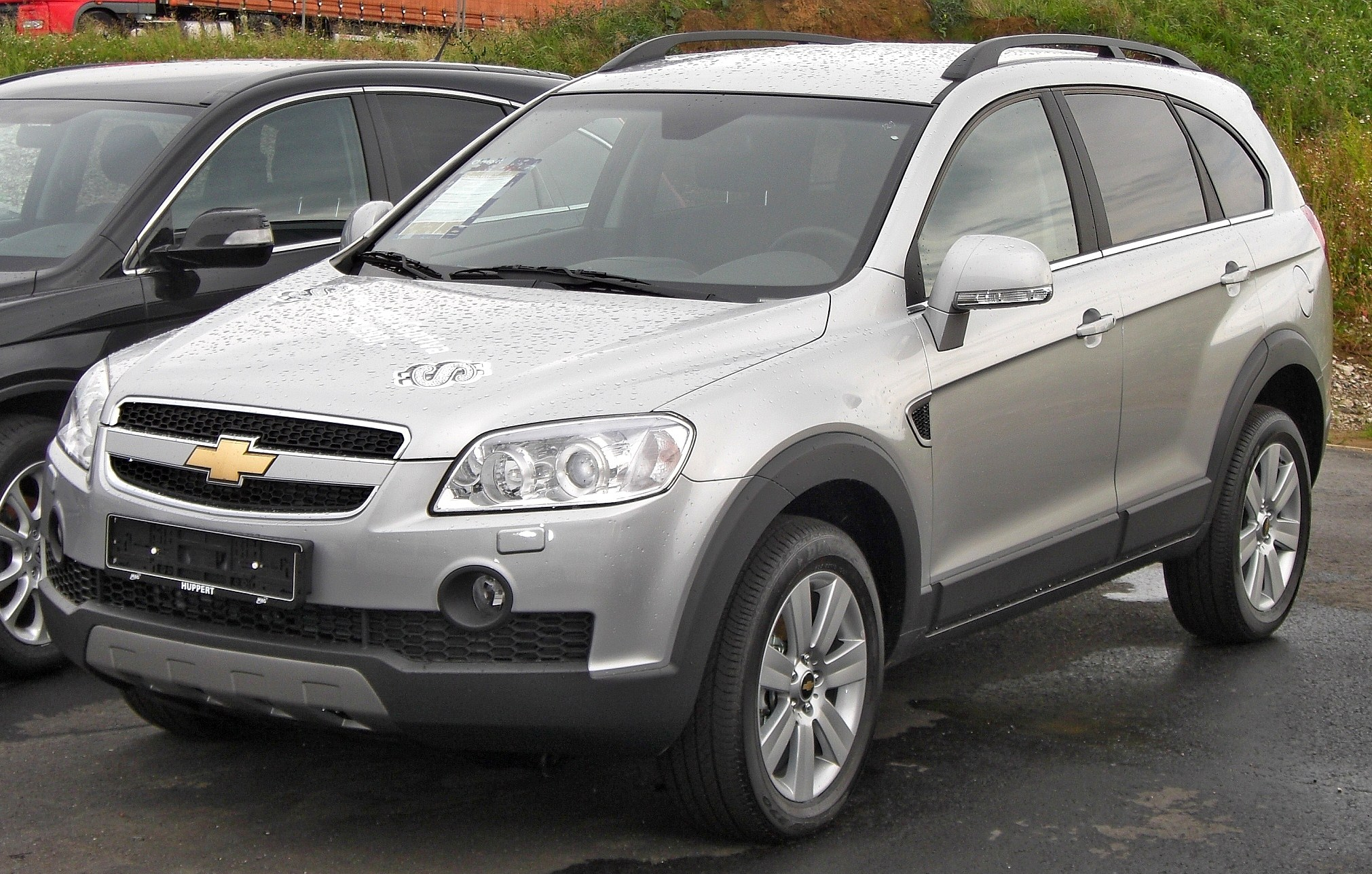
- Pre-facelift

Overview
- Also called: Daewoo Winstorm (2006–2011); Holden Captiva (2006–2010, 2015–2018); Holden Captiva 7 (2011–2015)
- Production: 2006–2018
- Assembly: South Korea: Bupyeong-gu, Incheon (GM Korea); Thailand: Rayong (GM Thailand); China: Shenyang (SAIC-GM); Vietnam: Hanoi (GM Vietnam); India: Halol, Gujarat (GM India); Russia: Kaliningrad (Avtotor); Kazakhstan: Oskemen/Ust-Kamenogorsk; Uzbekistan: Asaka (GM Uzbekistan); Egypt: 6th of October City (GM Egypt)

Body and chassis
- Layout: Front-engine, front-wheel-drive or four-wheel-drive
- Platform: GM Theta platform
- Related: Opel Antara

Powertrain
- Engine: Petrol: 2.4 L Ecotec I4; 2.4 L Family II I4; 3.0 L SIDI V6; 3.2 L Alloytec V6; Diesel: 2.0 L Fiat Family B VCDi turbo I4; 2.0 L VM Motori RA 420 VCDi turbo I4; 2.2 L GM Family Z VCDi turbo I4
- Transmission: 5-speed automatic 5-speed manual 6-speed automatic 6-speed manual

Dimensions
- Wheelbase: 2,707 mm (106.6 in)
- Length: 4,637 mm (182.6 in)
- Width: 1,849 mm (72.8 in)
- Height: 1,720 mm (67.7 in)

Chronology
- Successor: Holden Acadia (Holden Captiva 7); Chevrolet Equinox (worldwide)

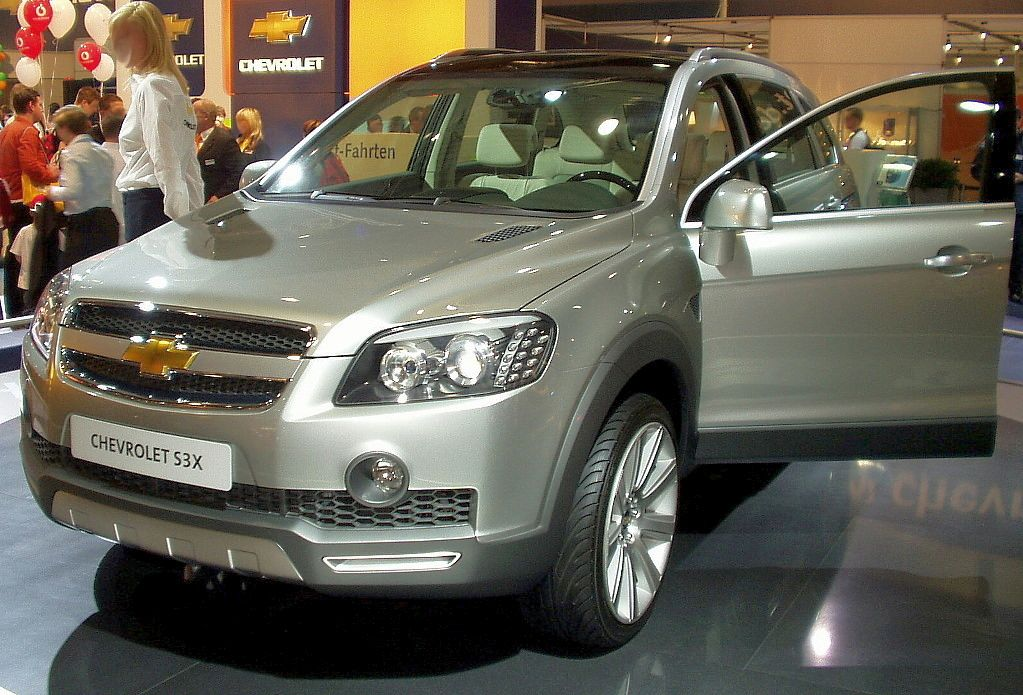
2004 Chevrolet S3X concept

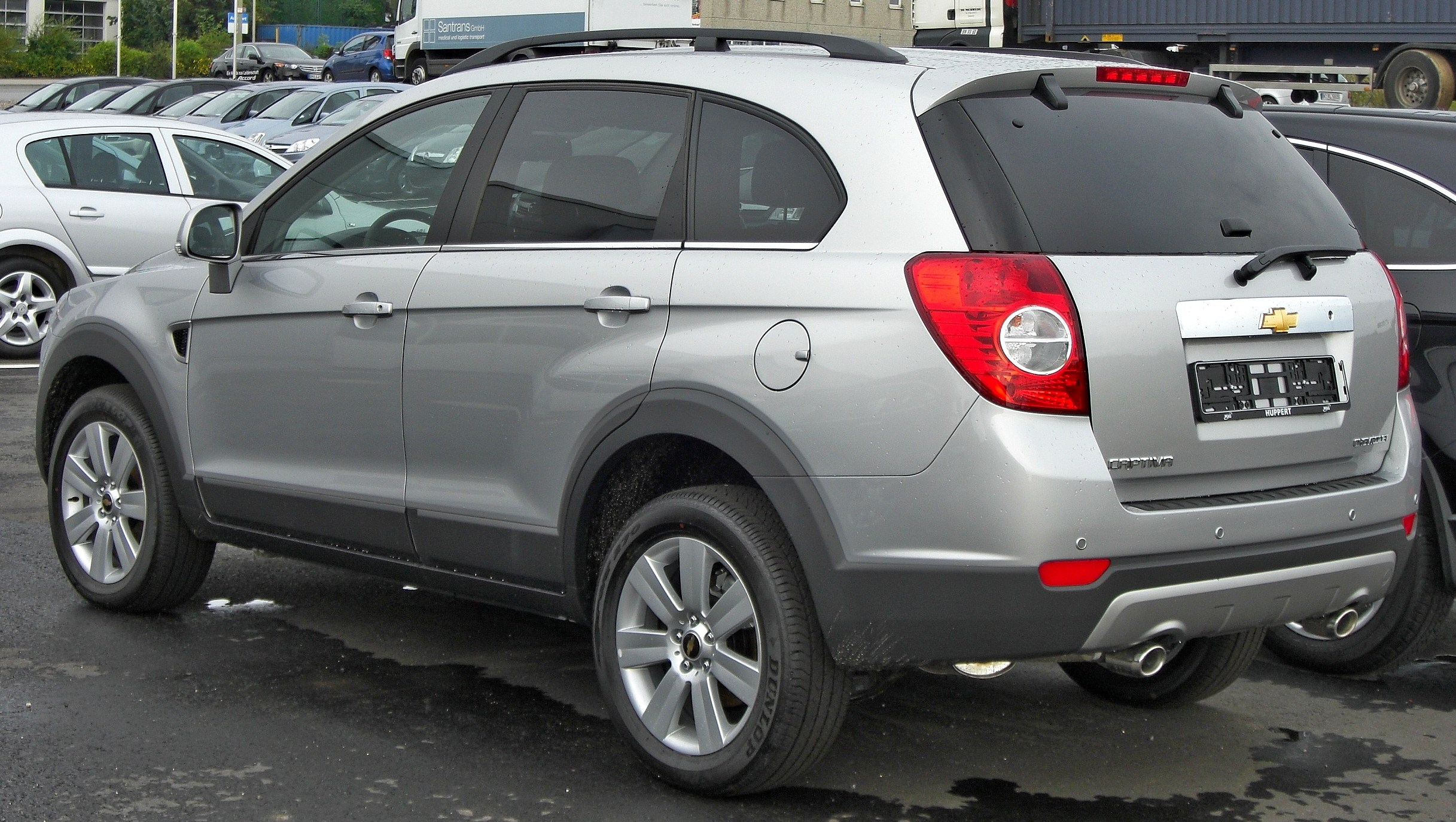
Rear (pre-facelift)

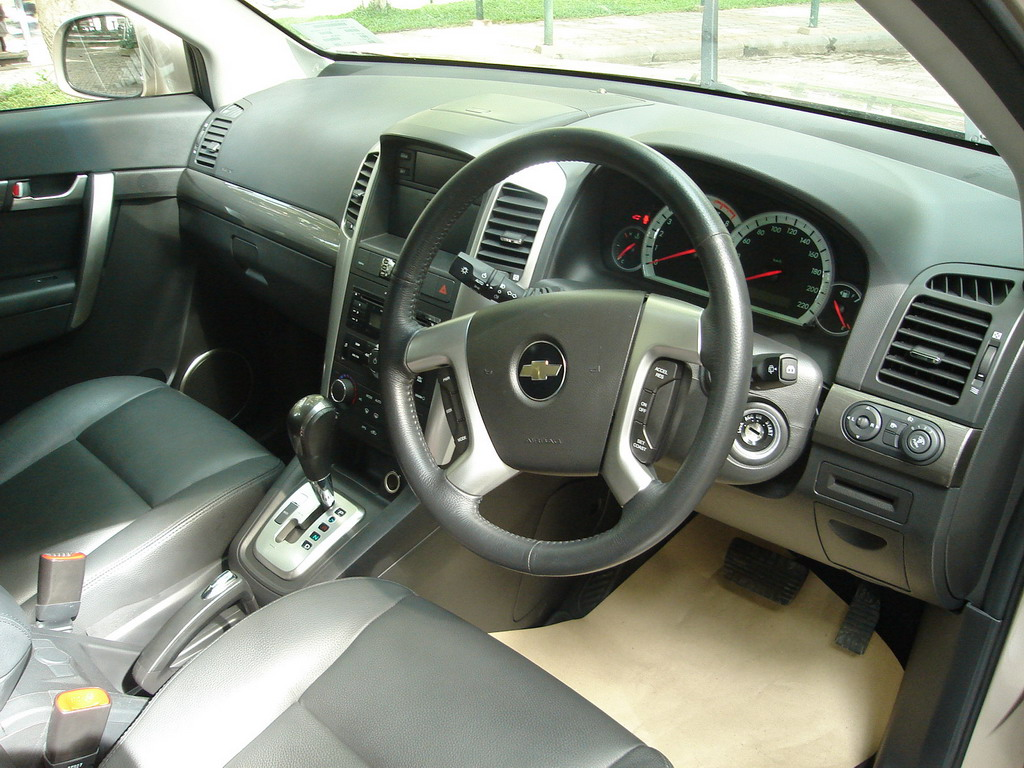
Interior

The Captiva is a front-wheel or all-wheel drive SUV; the engines were supplied by Holden in Australia, the Family II naturally aspirated four-cylinder petrol or the Alloytec Holden V6 built in Australia, and later a 2.0-L turbo-diesel supplied by VM Motori in South Korea.

Designated C100 by Daewoo and CG in Holden's terminology, the Captiva was launched in 2006. Styling of the Captiva was inspired by the 2004 Chevrolet S3X concept car. The S3X concept was developed by GM Daewoo's design center in Bupyeong-gu, Incheon and is based on the GM Theta platform. It premiered at 2004 Paris Motor Show. Another concept car, by Daewoo, the Chevrolet T2X premiered at the 2005 Seoul Motor Show with its design was based on the S3X, using a shortened platform. The T2X is referred to as a sport utility coupe, accounting for its rear hinged doors, lack of conventional B-pillars, and shortened wheelbase—features that were first revealed on the "Daewoo Oto" (later renamed "Daewoo Scope") concept at the 2002 Seoul Motor Show. Production was slated for late 2006, but as of 2009 no further announcement has been made.

For the Captiva, the production version of the S3X, both five- or seven-seat configurations are available. Standard safety features include: antilock brakes, electronic stability control (ESC), front seatbelt pretensioners and force limiters, and driver and front-passenger airbags. Side-curtain airbags are standard on higher luxury-level variants in some markets. In crash safety tests conducted by Euro NCAP, the Captiva was given a four out of five stars crash rating. The results from the test were helped by the use of high-strength steel used in the body shell which was designed to spread crash forces over distinct load channels, therefore ensuring the safety of the occupants within the safety cell. The vehicle's optional active all-wheel drive system is fully incorporated with the ESC and antilock braking systems, consequently improving car handling and control. When the vehicle detects a loss of traction, the all-wheel drive mode is activated automatically. In ordinary driving situations, only the vehicle's front wheels are used.

=== 2011 refresh ===
A revised Captiva range was released in the second quarter of 2011. The facelifted Captiva featured a new front fascia reminiscent to that of the Chevrolet Aveo (T300). Other noticeable cosmetic differences included LED turn signals on the door-mounted mirrors, redesigned wheels, and revised side air vents. The new SIDI alloy V6 was supplied from Holden in Australia, with the petrol four-cylinder 2.4-L and VM Motori 2.2-L turbo-diesel engines being made in South Korea.

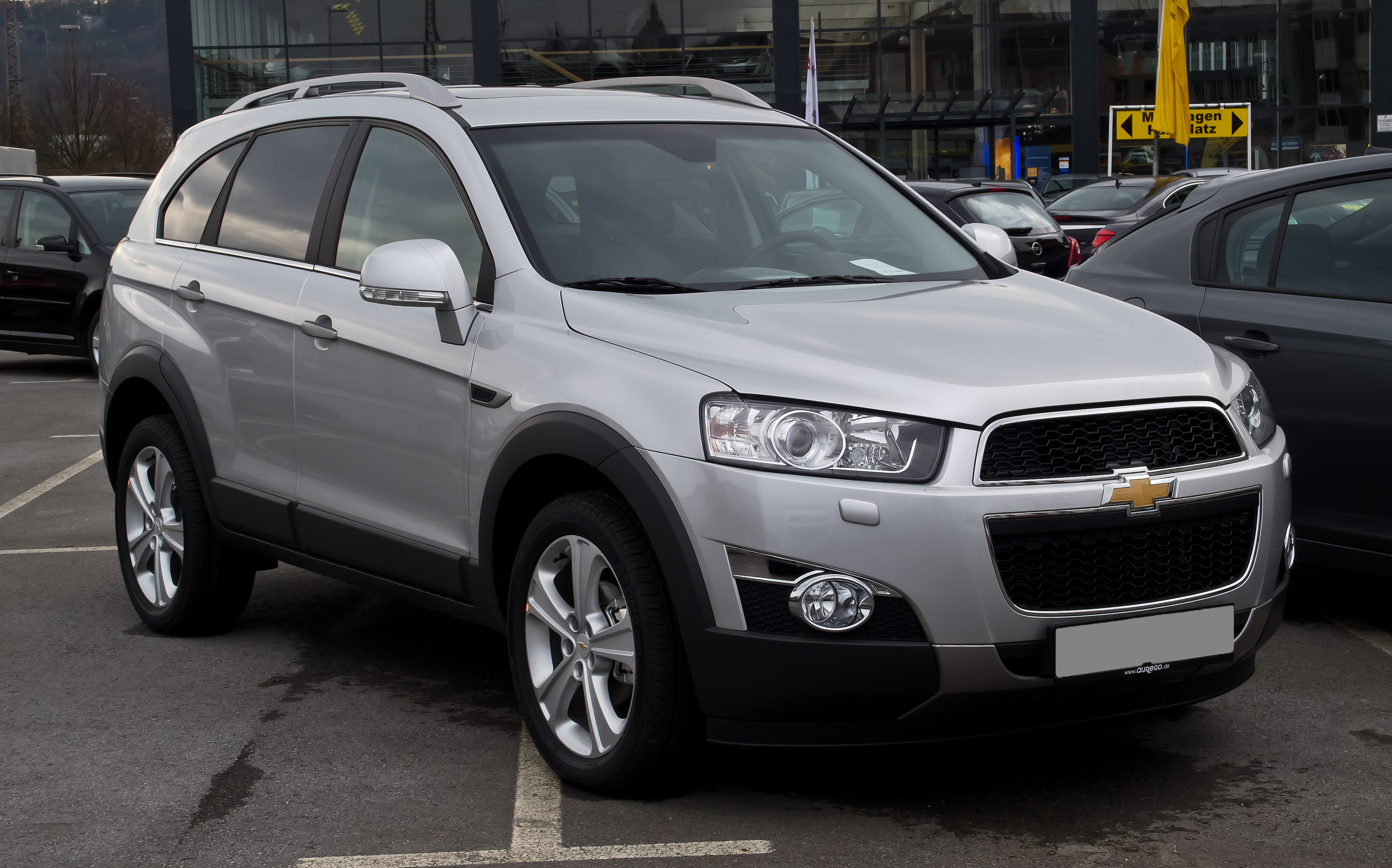
Chevrolet Captiva (facelift)

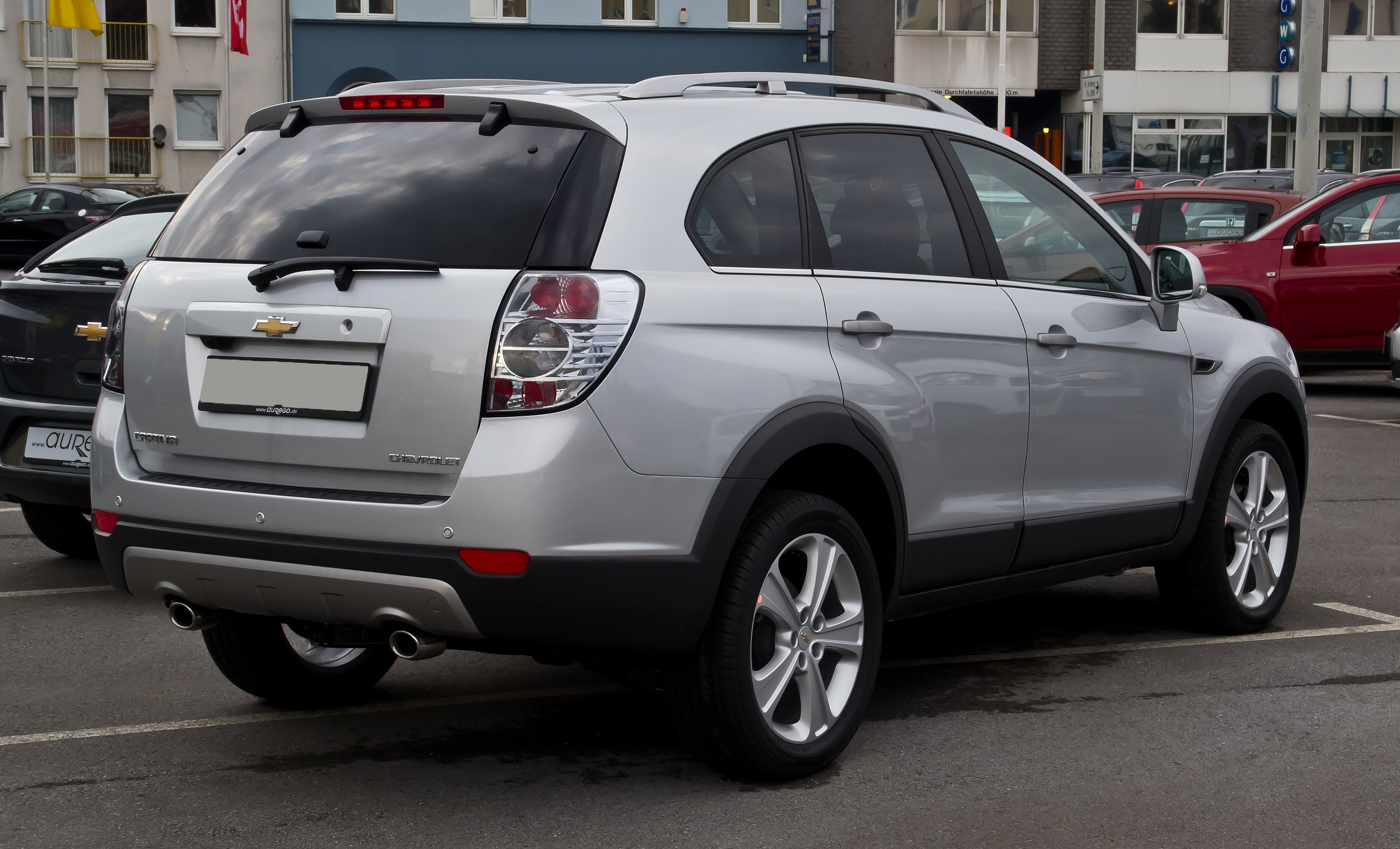
Chevrolet Captiva (facelift)

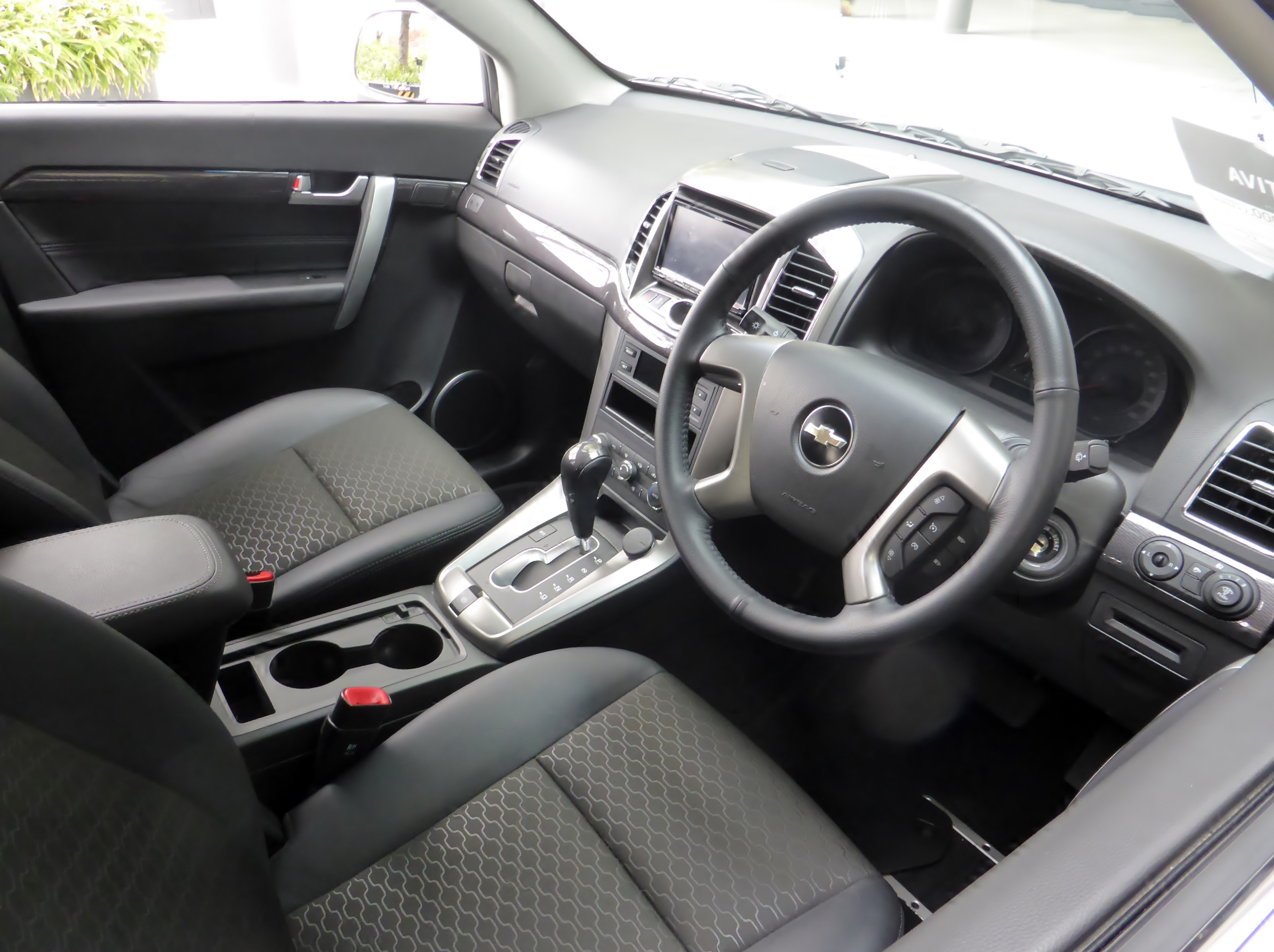
Interior (facelift)

=== 2016 refresh ===
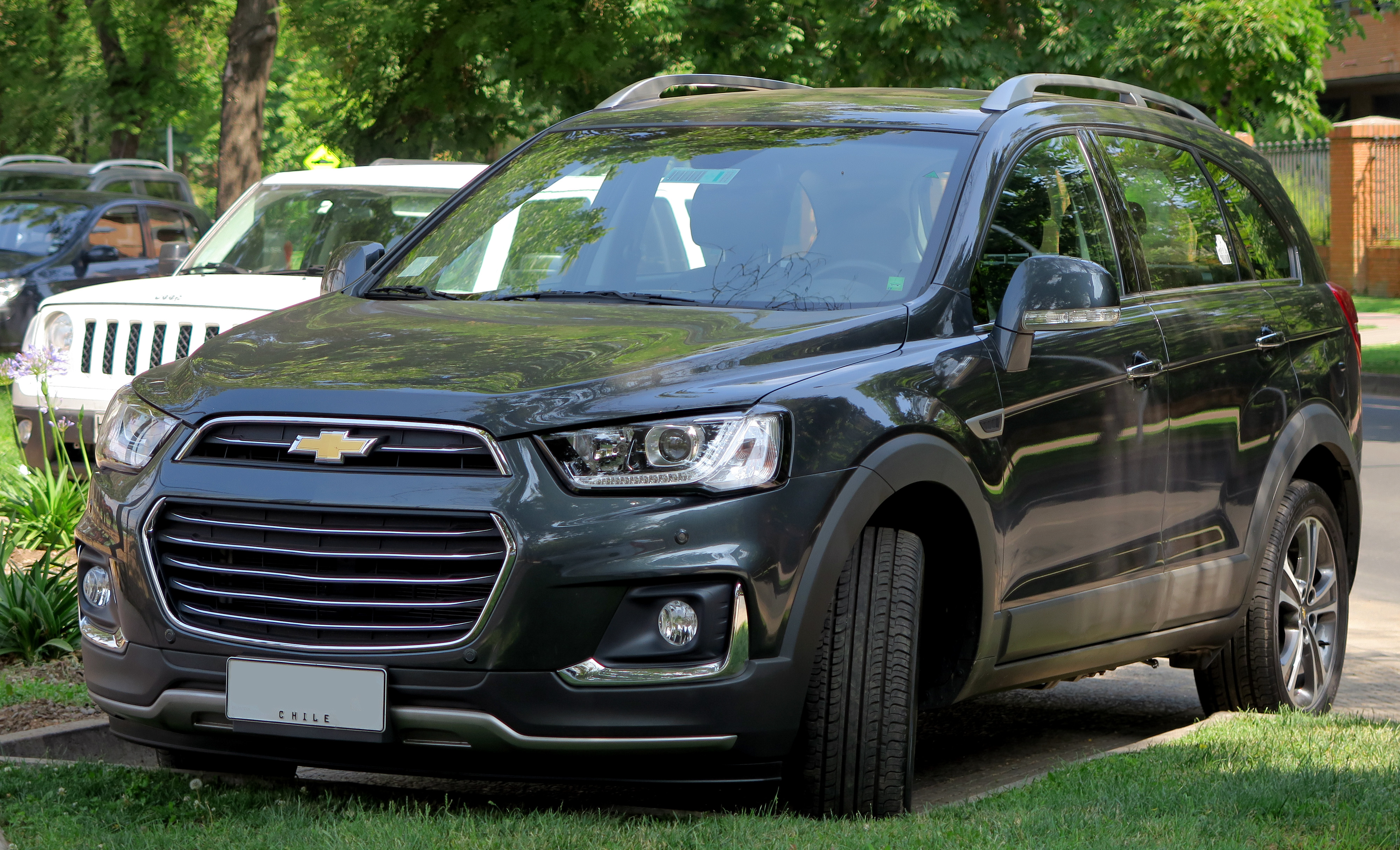

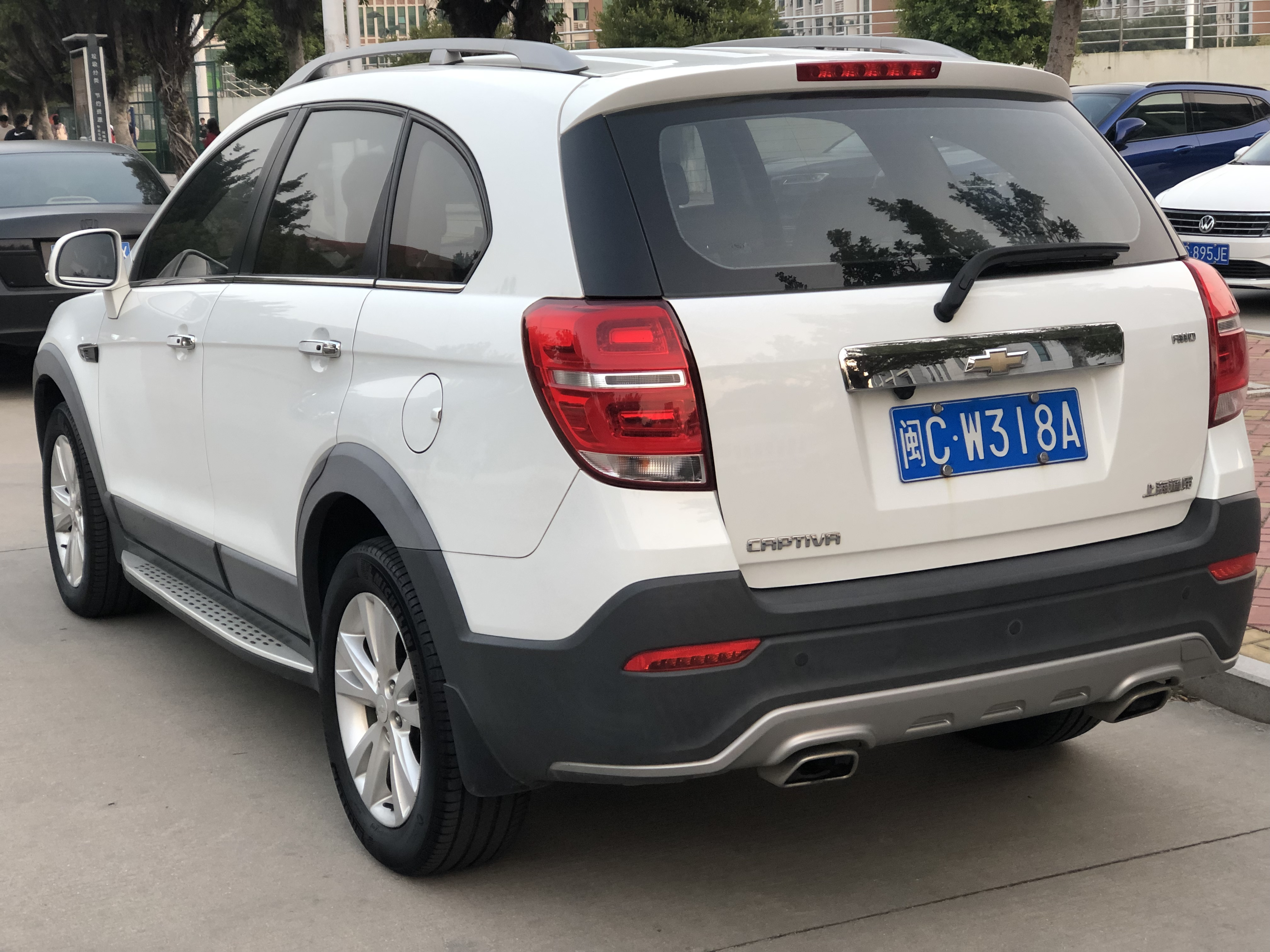
Second facelift

The new 2016 Chevrolet Captiva was unveiled at the Dubai International Motor Show 2015 on 10 November 2015. GM Thailand has also unveiled the facelifted Chevrolet Captiva at the 32nd annual Thailand International Motor Expo on 1 December 2015. A facelifted Holden Captiva was also unveiled a day later in Australia. The new Captiva has been updated with new LED headlamps, grille, bumper, and a redesigned dashboard, but retained its body and dashboard panels. The V6 engine was no longer sourced from Australia.

=== Powertrains ===
The Captiva is powered by the Australian (Holden)-built 3.2-litre Alloytec V6 engine mated to a five-speed automatic transmission, featuring Active Select. This engine is also shared by the Captiva's Opel Antara derivative, which uses a different design, but shares the same underpinnings and powertrain components. A four-cylinder VCDi common rail turbo-diesel engine, co-developed with VM Motori, was introduced into the range. The Captiva introduced 2.0 L (1,998 cc) and 2.2 L (2,231 cc) VCDi versions, offering 163 and 184 PS (120 and 135 kW; 161 and 181 hp) respectively.

Petrol
Model	Displacement	Power	Torque	Transmission	Note
2.4 Family II I4	2,405 cc	103 kW (138 hp)	220 N⋅m (162 lbf⋅ft)	5-speed manual	2006–2011
2.4 Ecotec I4	2,384 cc	123 kW (165 hp) (AU); 127 kW (170 hp) (Asia)	230 N⋅m (170 lbf⋅ft)	6-speed manual 6-speed 6T40 automatic	2011–
3.0 SIDI V6	2,997 cc	190 kW (255 hp)	288 N⋅m (212 lb⋅ft)	6-speed 6T50 automatic	2011–
3.2 Alloytec V6	3,195 cc	169 kW (227 hp)	297 N⋅m (219 lb⋅ft)	5-speed automatic	2006–2011
Diesel
Model	Displacement	Power	Torque	Transmission	Note
2.0 VCDi (VM Motori RA420) I4 (t/c)	1,991 cc	110 kW (148 hp)	320 N⋅m (236 lbf⋅ft)	5-speed manual 5-speed automatic	2006–2011
2.2 VCDi (Family Z) I4 (t/c)	2,231 cc	120 kW (161 hp)	350 N⋅m (258 lbf⋅ft)	6-speed manual 6-speed 6T45 automatic	2011–2015
2.2 VCDi (Family Z) I4 (t/c)	2,231 cc	135 kW (181 hp)	400 N⋅m (295 lbf⋅ft)	6-speed manual 6-speed 6T45 automatic	2011–2015
2.0 VCDi (Multijet II) I4 (t/c)	1,956 cc	126 kW (169 hp)	400 N⋅m (295 lbf⋅ft)	6-speed Aisin AWTF-80 automatic	2016–2018

=== Markets ===
==== Asia ====
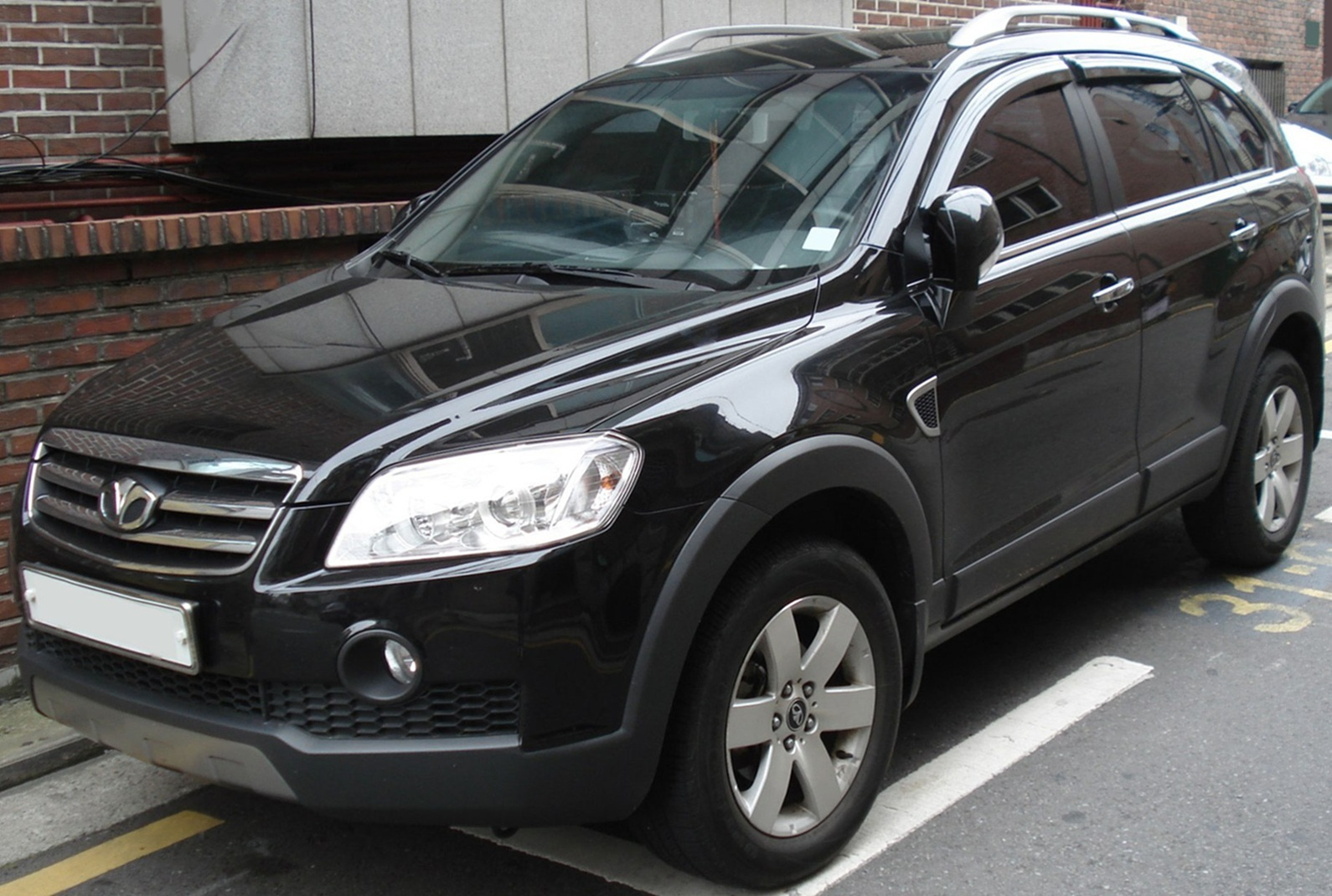
Pre-facelift Daewoo Winstorm LT

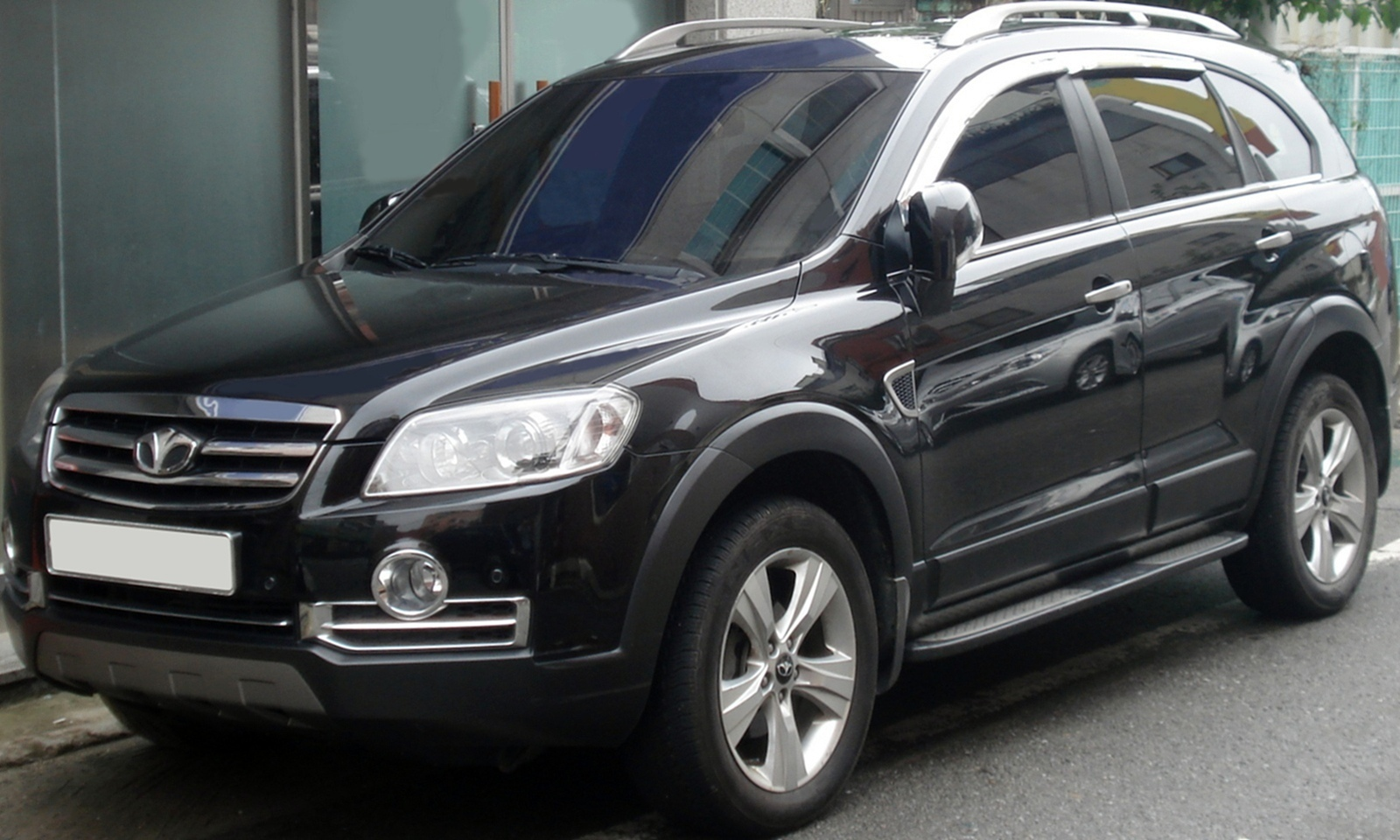
Facelift Daewoo Winstorm

South Korean cars were branded Daewoo Winstorm from 2006. From 2006 until early 2011, the Opel Antara became available in the Winstorm range, as the "Daewoo Winstorm MaXX". As part of GM's strategy to phase out the "Daewoo" brand worldwide, since early 2011, the Winstorm has been marketed under the global Chevrolet Captiva name in South Korea. This rebranding came after the March 2011 renaming of GM Daewoo to GM Korea. At the same time, the Winstorm MaXX disappeared without a Chevrolet-badged equivalent (except Latin America and South America, which was sold outside of South Korea).

The Chevrolet Captiva was launched in Vietnam during 2006. The Captiva in Vietnam was manufactured in complete knock-down form by Vidamco (GM Vietnam), with 20% local parts content. From 2006 to July 2009, 8,500 Captivas have been sold in Vietnam.

In Thailand, Captivas have been produced at the GM facility in Rayong between 2006 and 2018. Chevrolet Thailand offered the Captiva in LS and LT variants, with engines comprising either the 2.4-L petrol or 2.0-L diesel units. Captiva also featured the availability of self-levelling rear suspension, ESC, automatic headlamps, and rain-sensing wipers. Late in 2010, Chevrolet expanded the diesel line-up to include a mid-range LSX and flagship LTZ model. At the same time, Captivas fitted with the 2.4-L petrol engine benefitted from E20 ethanol support and increased power to 125 kW (170 PS). On 23 June 2011, Chevrolet Thailand unveiled the updated the Captiva using the new 2.4-L petrol engine with support of E85 ethanol fuel. New features include an electric parking brake, climate control commands on the steering wheel; and later, the updated 2.0-L diesel engine rated at 120 kW (163 PS).

The Captiva entered the Chinese market in early November 2007. The only available engine was the 2.4-L Ecotec inline-four engine mated to a six-speed automatic. Production ended in 2017.

In the Philippines, the Captiva was launched in 2008. Engines offered were the 2.4L D-TEC mated to a 5-speed automatic transmission with Tiptronic or the 2.0L turbo diesel exclusively mated to a 5-speed automatic transmission.

In Japan, the Captiva was launched on 30 July 2011, the first GM model to be released there since the company's chapter 11 reorganisation in June 2009.

==== Australia & New Zealand ====
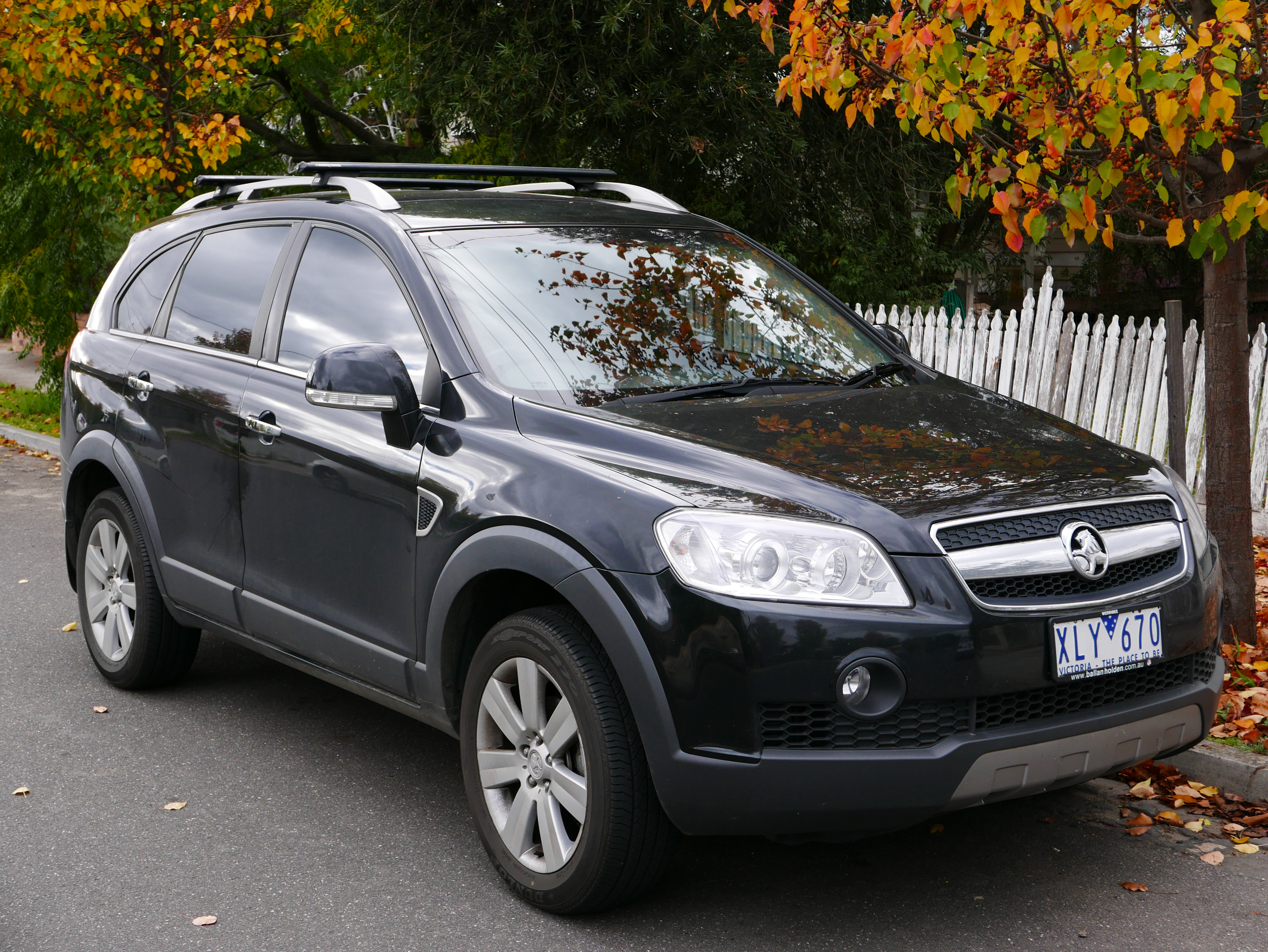
Pre-facelift Holden Captiva

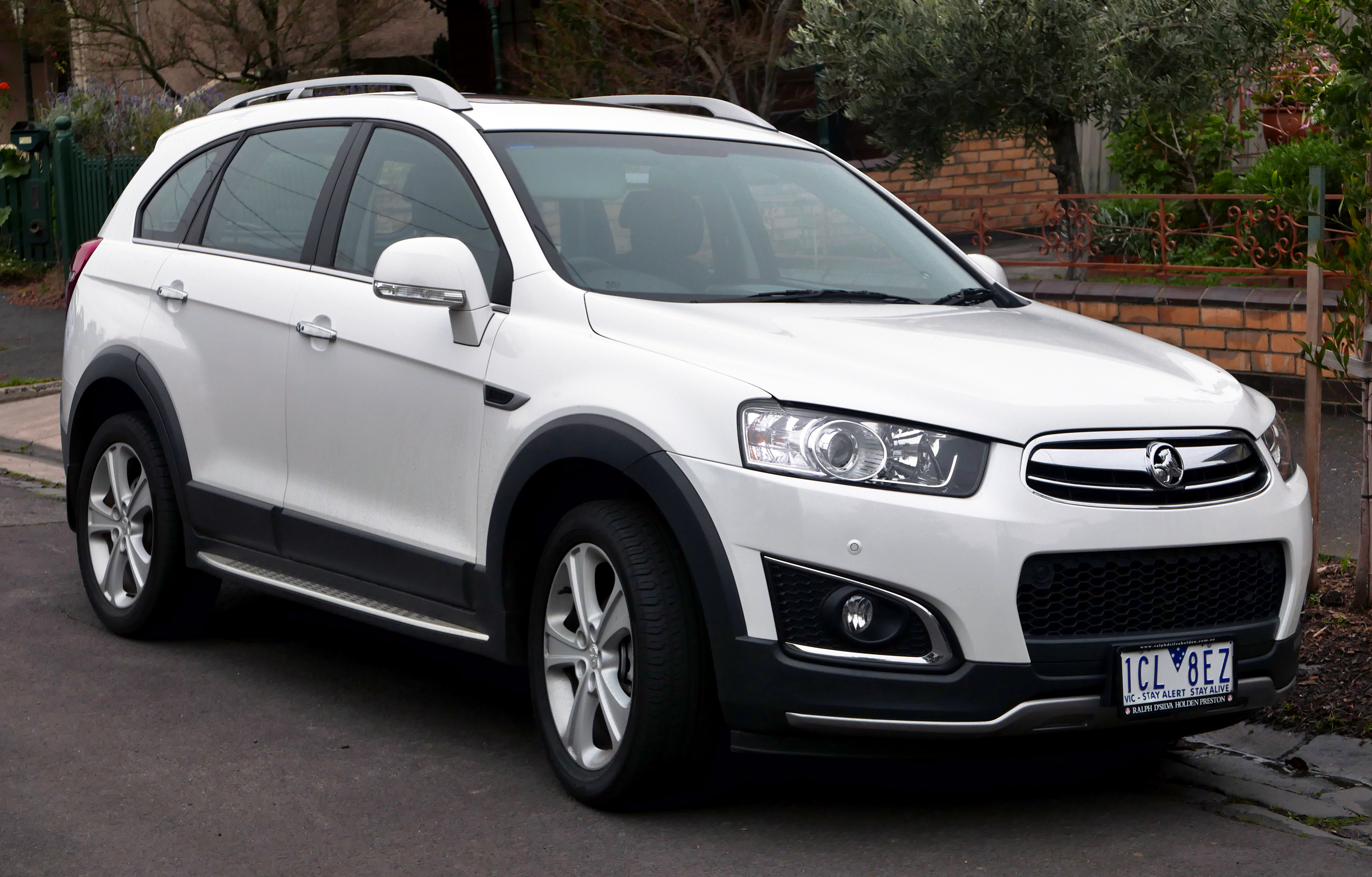
First facelift

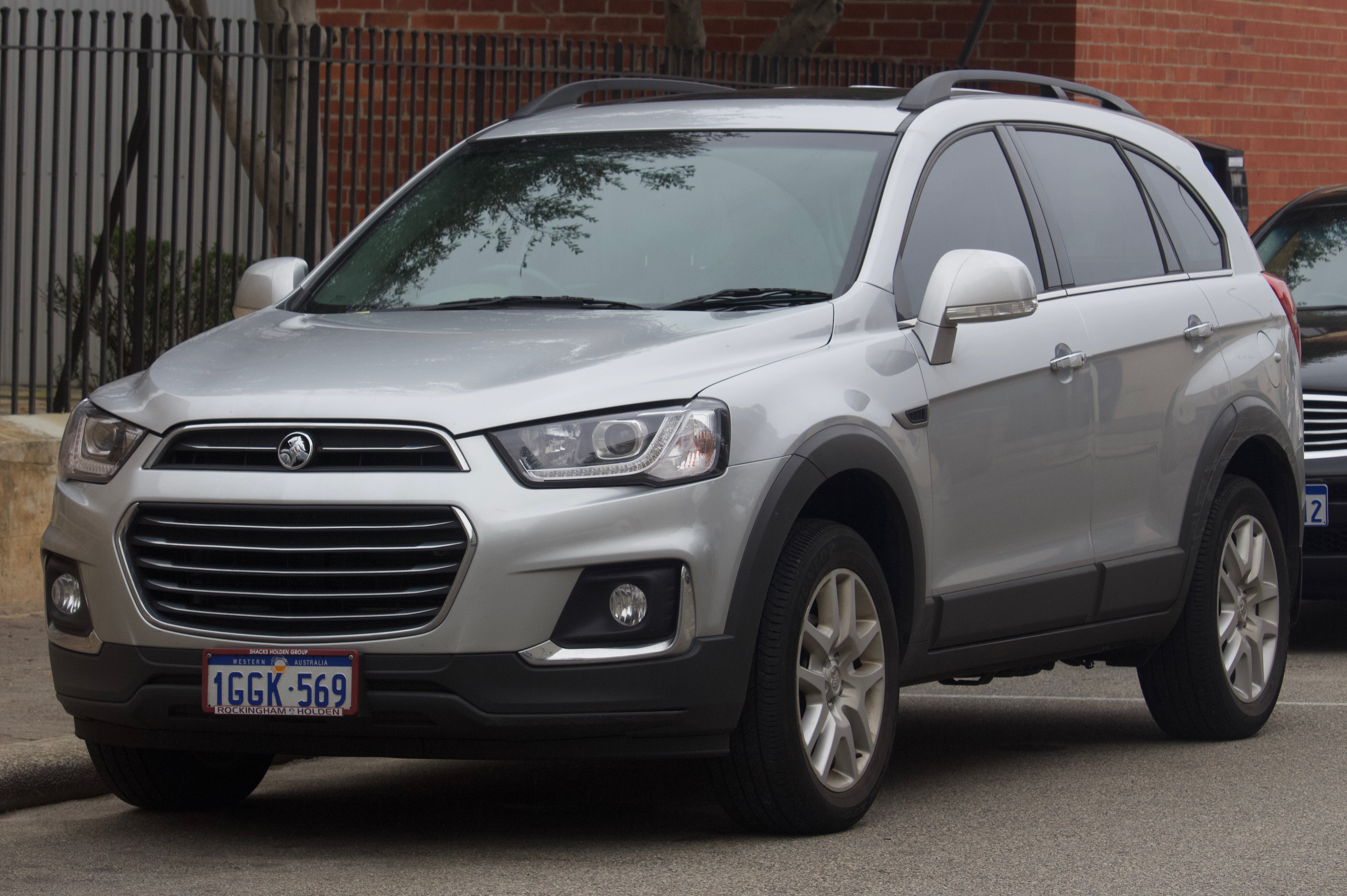
Second facelift

Holden in Australia and New Zealand have sold the vehicle under the "Holden Captiva" name between November 2006 and 2017, after announcing the model the previous September. The Captiva launched with the 3.2-L V6 and five-speed automatic transmission, but March 2007 had the addition of the 2.0-L diesel engine with five-speed manual or optional automatic. While initially manufactured in South Korea, production was temporarily shifted to Thailand from September 2007 until early 2008 while GM Daewoo upgraded its production facilities in South Korea to cope with global demand.

Specification levels were SX, CX, and LX, with a range-topping Captiva MaXX variant offered, although this was a rebadge of the closely related Opel Antara. The Antara-derived MaXX remained on sale in Australia until 2008, with New Zealand sales continuing on until the end of 2009. When Holden resurrected the Antara-based model as a price-leading five-seater "Captiva 5" in December 2009, the seven-seat only Chevrolet-based models were renamed "Captiva 7".

Revisions to the Captiva 7 range were announced in February 2011, designated "Series II", with a March on-sale date. Changes included the adoption of the facelifted front-end fascia, as applied to Chevrolet versions, but with a Holden-specific grille and air intake. New design alloy wheels, "Altezza" tail lamps, and other trimmings feature, as does a revised interior centre console. Equipment-wise, the revised centre console houses a new 7-inch multifunction display in LX trim, which incorporates satellite navigation and a rear-view camera. Revised powertrains also feature on the Series II. The base setup is the SX trim with the 2.4-L petrol using front-wheel drive; the 2.2-L diesel was optional. The CX and LX variants add all-wheel drive and offer the 3.0-L V6 as standard, with the 2.2-L diesel remaining optional. All three engines are paired with a six-speed automatic.

Holden announced a minor model year update in July 2012, the centrepiece of which was the addition of flex-fuel capability for both petrol engines, thus allowing them to accept E85 ethanol fuel. A cut in the official combined fuel consumption of the 3.0-L by 10% has also been achieved, with smaller gains for the 2.4-L petrol and 2.2-L diesel engines. At the same time, the base SX received standard rear parking sensors and the range-topping LX came additionally equipped with heated front seats and front park assist.

==== Middle East ====
In the Middle East, the Captiva launched with two basic trims: one with the 2.4-L gasoline engine and another with the 3.0-L V6. Both trims are seven-seaters and offer front-wheel drive.

=== Discontinuation ===
On 13 September 2018, Chevrolet announced that it is ending production on the first generation Captiva and will phase it out globally in favor of expanding the Equinox. The move had been in the works since 2017, when GM began replacing the Captiva in Australia with the Equinox for the Holden lineup, followed by South Korea in August 2018, with GM's Uzbekistan plant ceasing production on 12 September 2018.

== Second generation (CN202S; 2019) ==
The second-generation Captiva is a rebadged version of Baojun 530. The model is developed and produced by SAIC-GM-Wuling and exported to several emerging markets. It was introduced in Colombia in November 2018 and Thailand in March 2019. It was launched in select South American markets starting from April 2019, in Thailand in September 2019, Middle East in May 2020, and Mexico in March 2021. The left-hand drive Captiva for the Latin American and Middle Eastern market are imported from China and it is positioned between the Tracker/Trax and Equinox. The right-hand drive Captiva offered in Thailand, Brunei and Fiji were produced in Indonesia until 2020.

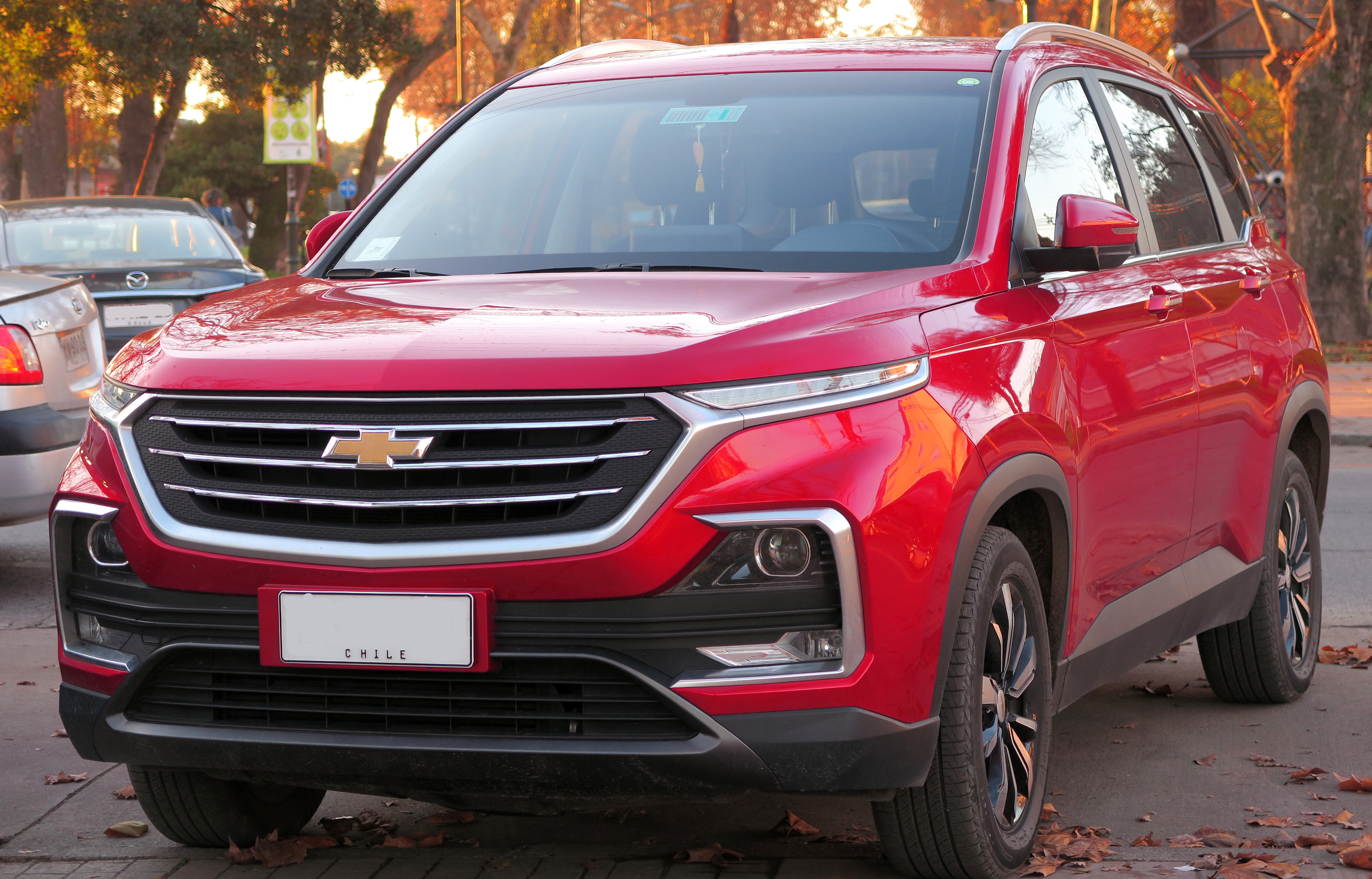
2020 Chevrolet Captiva 1.5T Premier (Chile; pre-facelift)

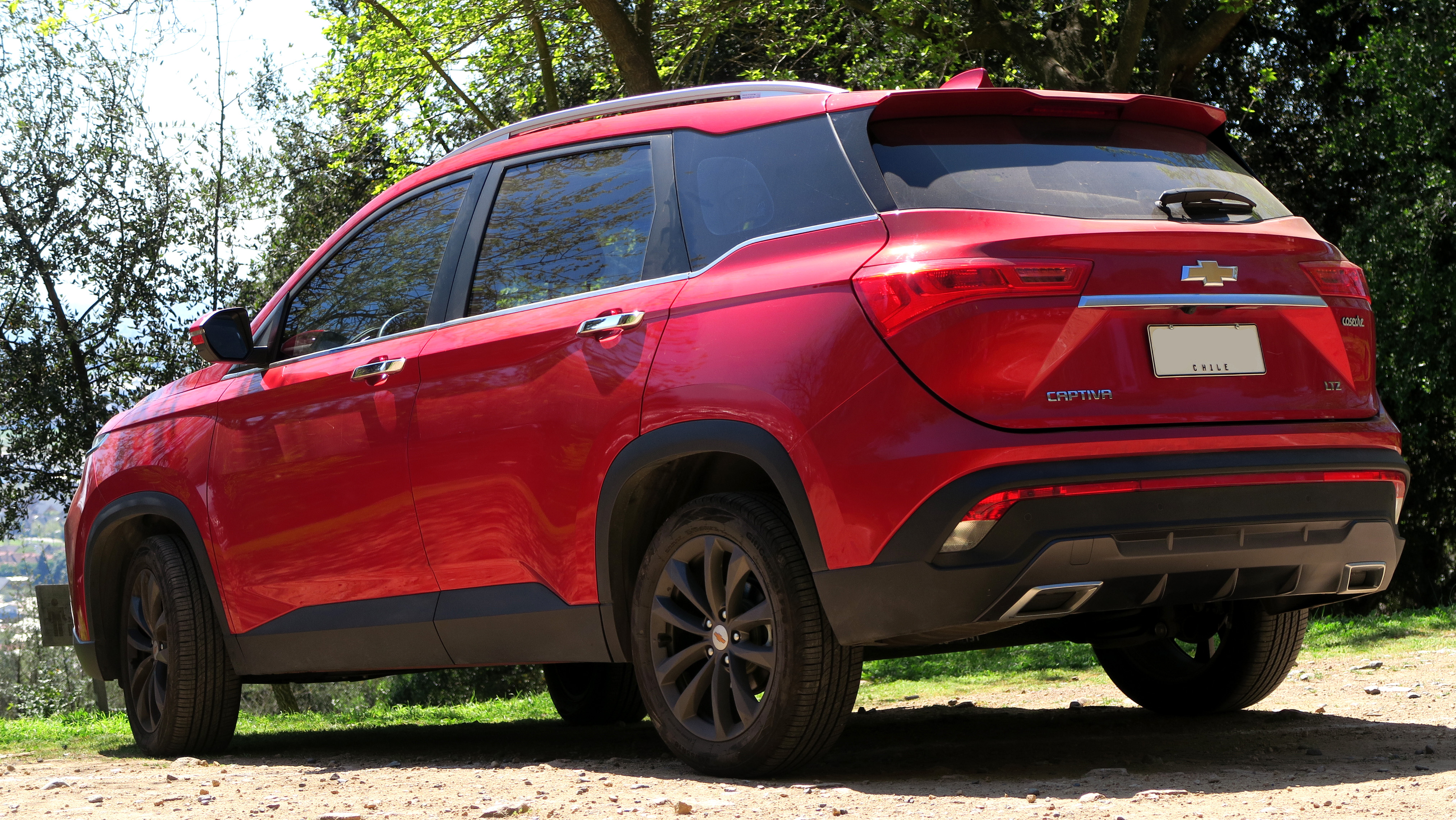
2020 Chevrolet Captiva 1.5T LTZ (Chile; pre-facelift)

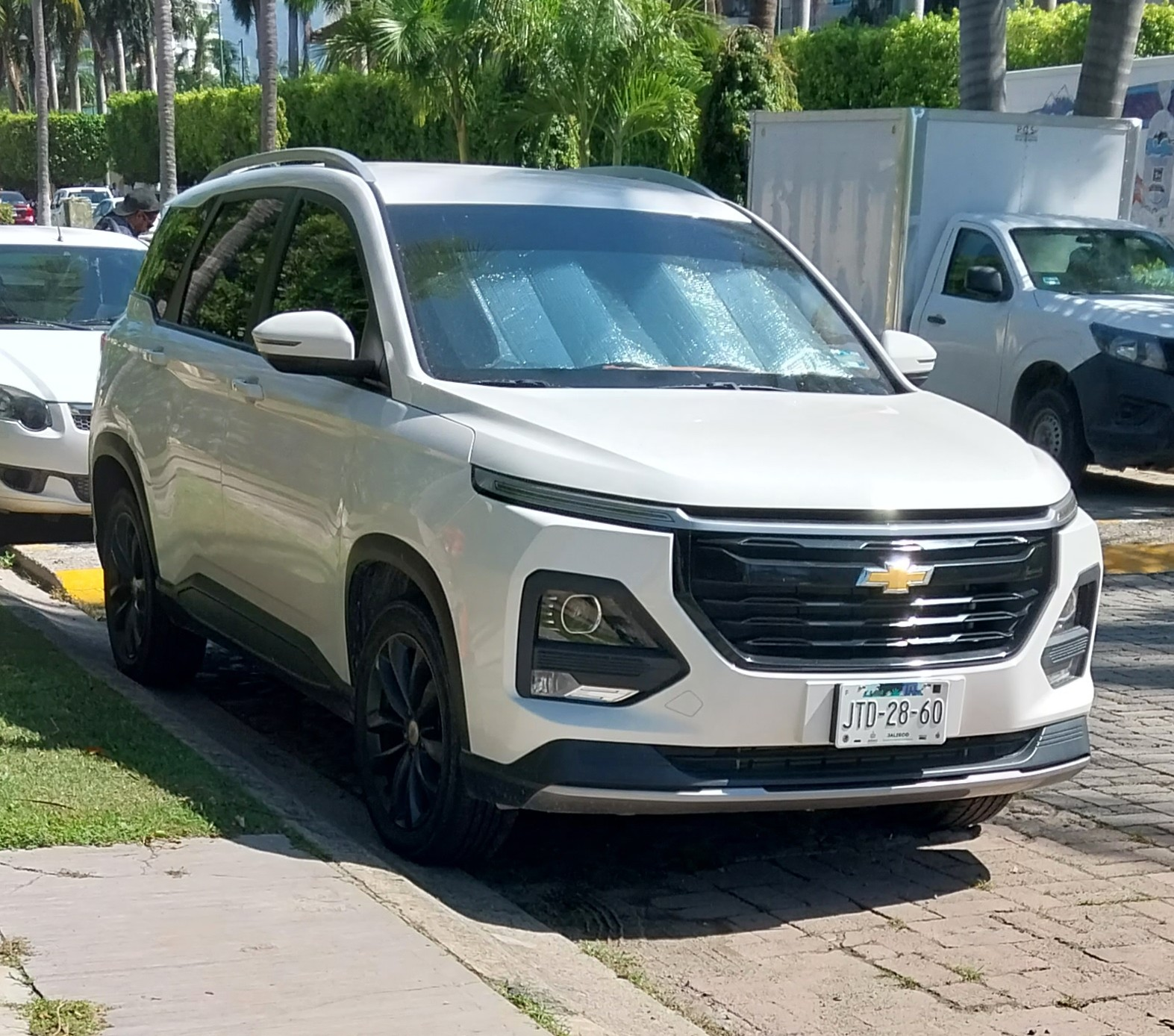
2022 Chevrolet Captiva 1.5T LTZ (Mexico; first facelift)

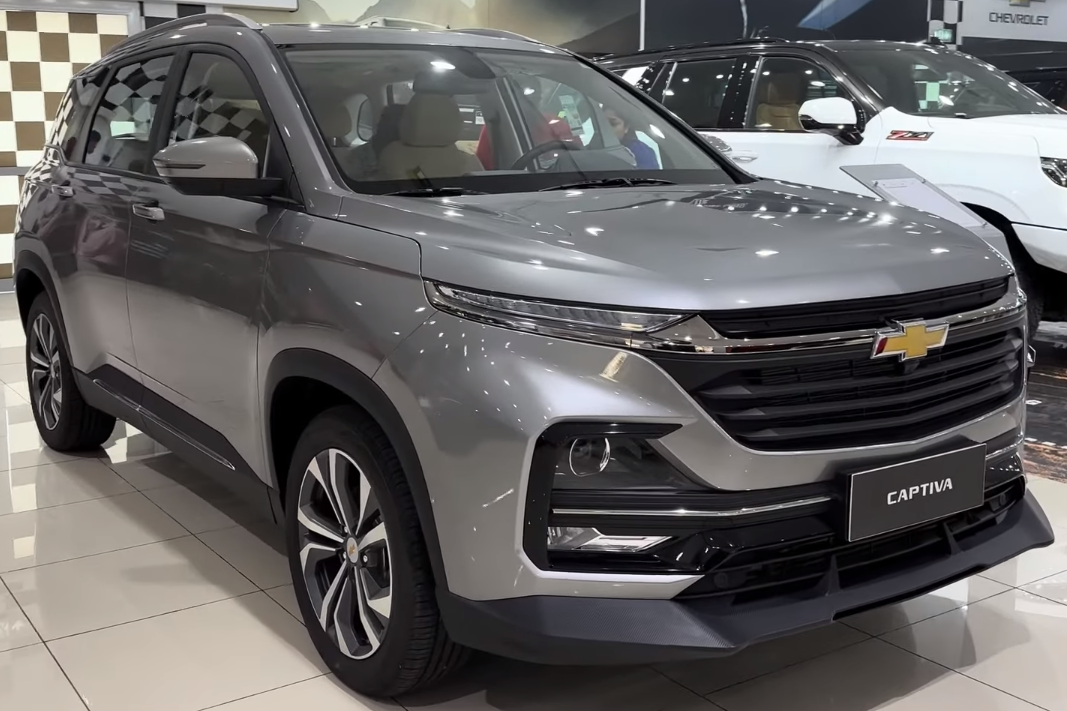
2023 Chevrolet Captiva 1.5T Premier (UAE; second facelift)

== Captiva EV/PHEV (F710S; 2025) ==
Chevrolet Captiva Premier PHEV

In 2025, Chevrolet announced to launch a rebadged version of the Wuling Starlight S in Latin America, Middle East and Philippines as the Captiva EV and PHEV.

== Sales ==
Year	South Korea	Europe	China	Thailand	Colombia	Malaysia (Note: Figures based on registration (Malaysia))	Indonesia
2005		3					—N/a
2006		8,677					—N/a
2007		31,257				31	992
2008		24,845				522	1,582
2009		14,315			1,077	282	1,749
2010		20,241			6,433	231	2,181
2011		15,957			10,767	391	2,437
2012		19,979	22,859		7,849	176	2,530
2013		13,216	37,611			226	1,721
2014	9,370	2,928	31,589	2,530	3,736	53	1,385
2015	8,511	59	32,357	1,321		14	709
2016	2,809	12	21,956	590		1	20
2017		1	8,973	483	545	0	276
2018							71
2019				530			—N/a (Note: The Chevrolet Captiva was discontinued in late 2018.)
2020				2,588	1,739		—N/a
2021			1		2,054		—N/a
