= Opel Antara =

German compact crossover SUV

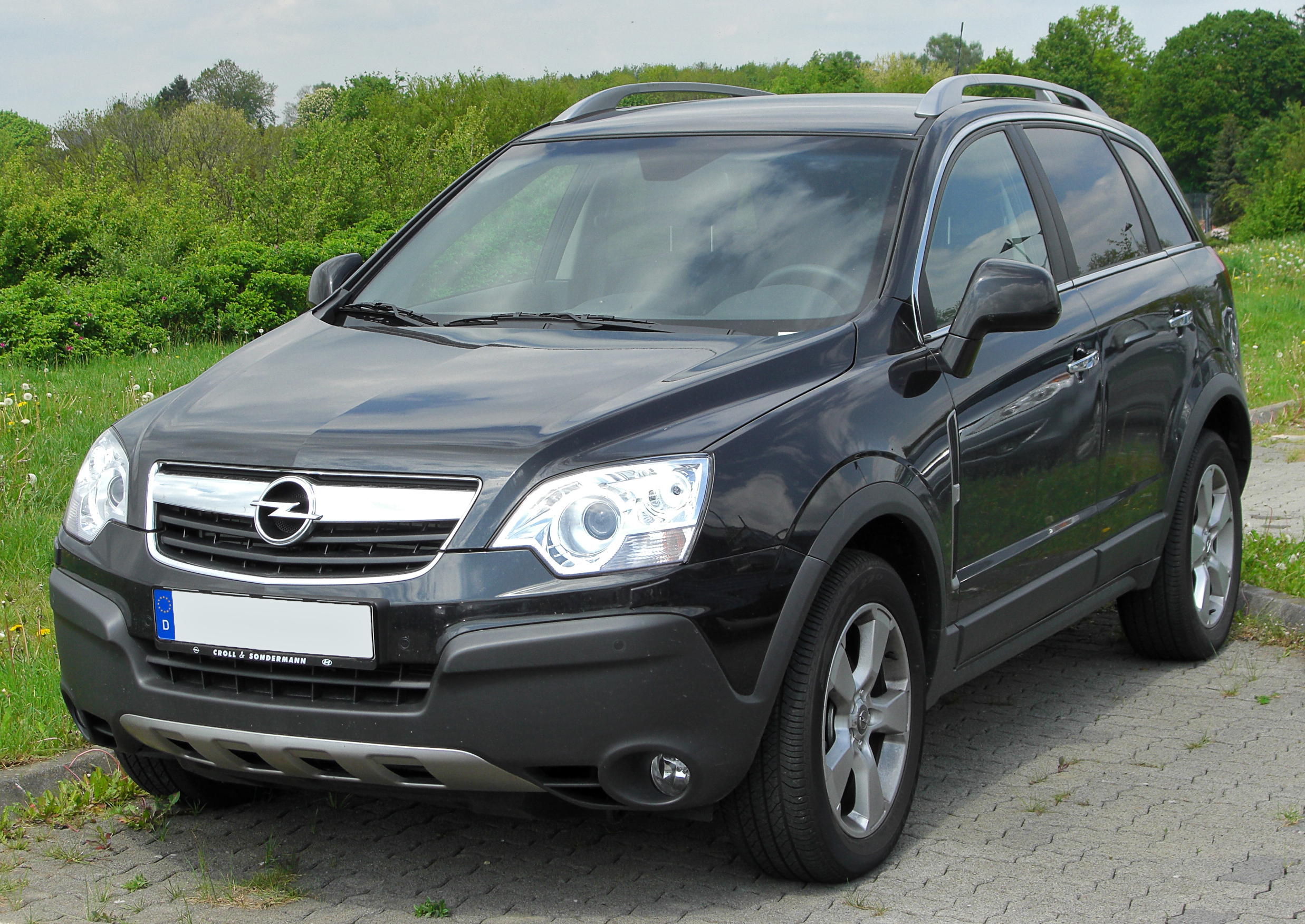

Overview
- Manufacturer: General Motors
- Model code: L07; CG (Holden)
- Also called: Vauxhall Antara (United Kingdom); Daewoo Winstorm MaXX (South Korea, 2008–2011); Chevrolet Captiva Sport (Americas); Holden Captiva MaXX (Australasia, 2006–2009); Holden Captiva 5 (Australasia, 2009–2015); Saturn Vue (US and Canada, 2008–2010); GMC Terrain (Middle East, 2008–2010)
- Production: 2006–2015 (Europe)
- Assembly: South Korea: Bupyeong (GM Korea); Mexico: Ramos Arizpe (GM México); Russia: St. Petersburg (GM Auto)

Body and chassis
- Class: Compact crossover SUV (C)
- Body style: 5-door SUV
- Layout: Front-engine, front-wheel-drive or all-wheel-drive
- Platform: GM Theta
- Related: Chevrolet Captiva (C100/C140)

Powertrain
- Engine: Petrol: 2.4 L Family II I4; 2.4 L Ecotec I4; 3.2 L High Feature V6; 3.0 L High Feature V6; 3.5 L High Value V6; 3.6 L High Feature V6; Diesel: 2.0 L VCDi turbo I4; 2.2 L VCDi turbo I4
- Transmission: 6-speed manual; 4-speed automatic; 5-speed automatic; 6-speed automatic; CVT 2MT70 automatic

Dimensions
- Wheelbase: 2,707 mm (106.6 in)
- Length: 4,575 mm (180.1 in)
- Width: 1,850 mm (72.8 in)
- Height: 1,704 mm (67.1 in)
- Curb weight: 1,885–1,996 kg (4,156–4,400 lb)

Chronology
- Predecessor: Opel Frontera; Holden Frontera Sport (Australia)
- Successor: Opel Grandland (Europe); Chevrolet/Holden Equinox; Buick Envision (North America); GMC Terrain (North America and Middle East)

The Opel Antara is a compact crossover SUV which was marketed by Opel from 2006 to 2015. Based on the Theta platform, the Antara closely shared its underpinnings and powertrains with the Chevrolet Captiva. Unlike the Captiva, it is only offered with five seats instead of seven, and features a different exterior and interior design. Sales commenced in November 2006, as the indirect successor to the Isuzu-based Frontera range.

In the United Kingdom, the car was sold as the Vauxhall Antara; in Australasia, the car was badged as the Holden Captiva 5/Captiva MaXX; and in the United States and Canada, it had been sold as the Saturn Vue. The Antara was marketed as the GMC Terrain in the Middle East, Daewoo Winstorm MaXX in South Korea, and as the Chevrolet Captiva Sport in the Americas except Chile, where it was sold as an Opel.

== Production ==
The Antara was first previewed by the three door Opel Antara GTC (Gran Turismo Crossover) concept car, presented at the 2005 Frankfurt Motor Show. The Antara GTC is based on the three-door Chevrolet T2X SUV. A similar three-door SUV was later displayed at the 2006 New York International Auto Show as the Saturn PreVue.

The production Antara was a longer five-door SUV, similar to the Chevrolet S3X and the closely related Chevrolet Captiva.

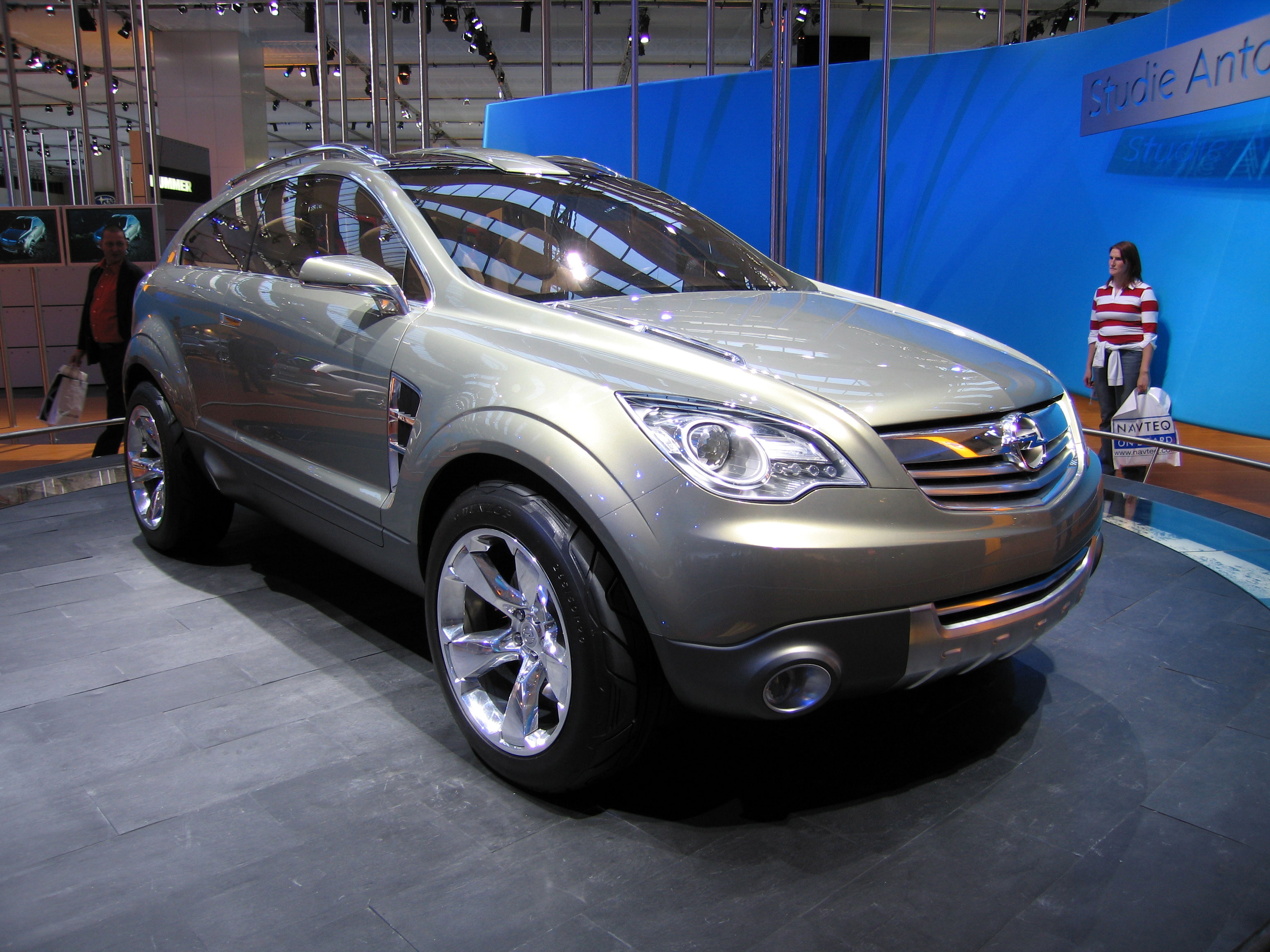
Opel Antara GTC (concept)

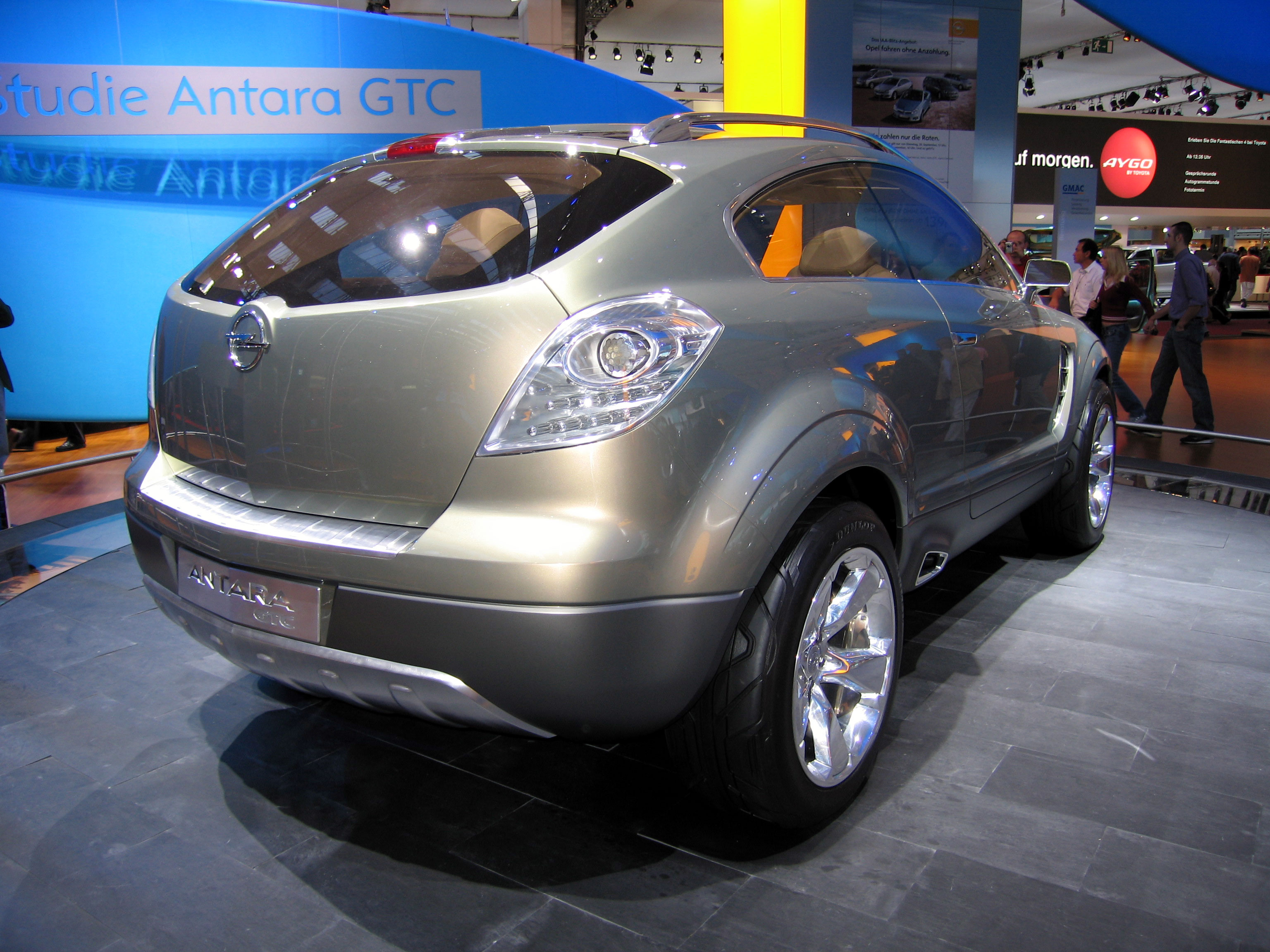
Opel Antara GTC (concept)

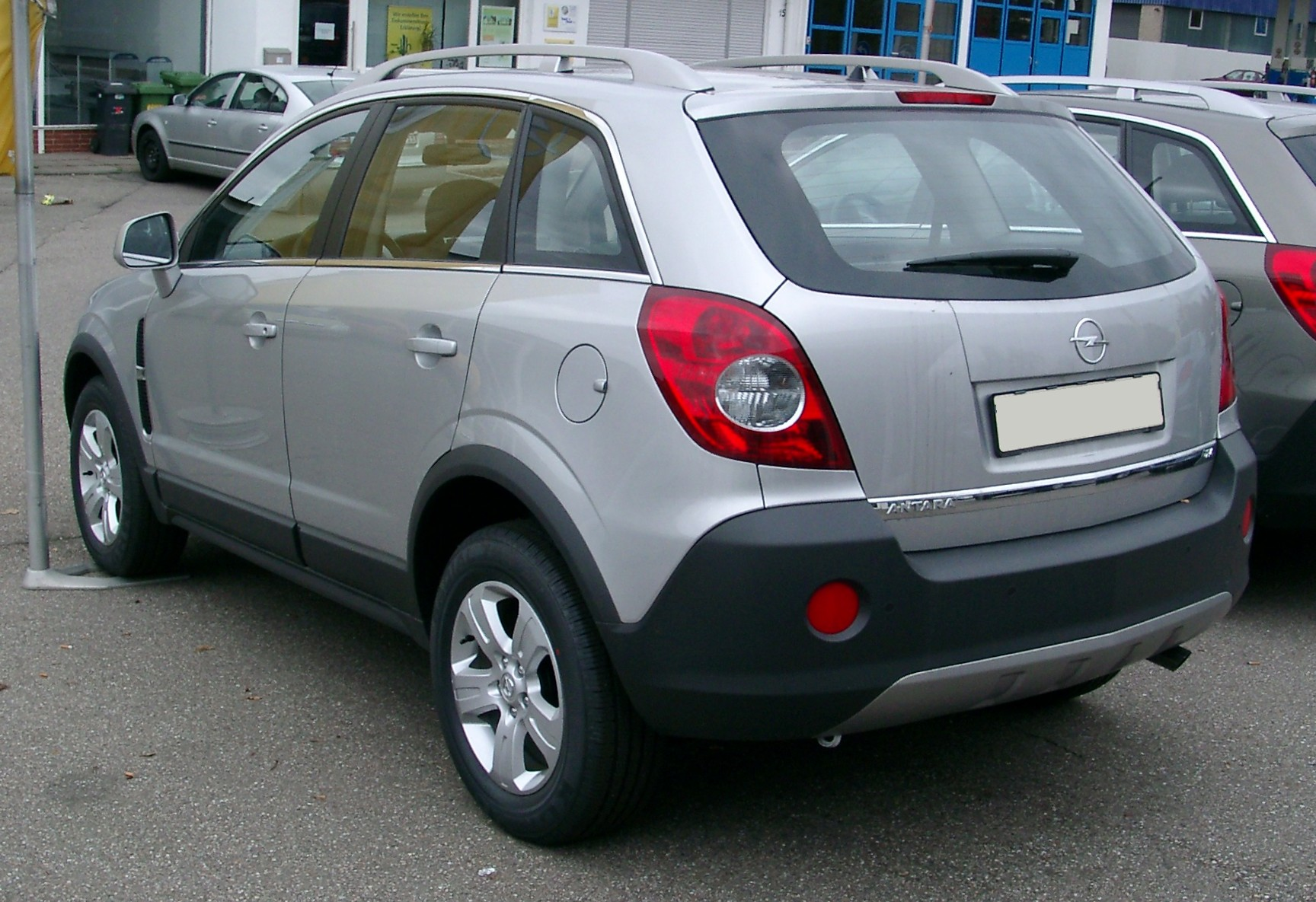
Production model (pre facelift)

=== Facelift ===
In November 2010, a facelift was announced for the 2011 model year. The front end was revised, and both front and rear lights were refreshed. The new Opel badge also appear on the Opel Antara, respectively. On the inside, there was a revised centre console with more storage space and materials, improved instrument graphics and interior lighting.

An electric parking brake, a hill assistance system, and a "shift up" indicator to optimise fuel economy in manual-transmission versions were all now standard. Introduced with the facelift was a new, Euro 5 compliant 2.2-litre diesel engine which replaced the previous 2.0-litre, and an updated version of the 2.4-litre petrol.

Production ended in March 2015; its indirect successor was the Grandland X, which was launched in September 2017.

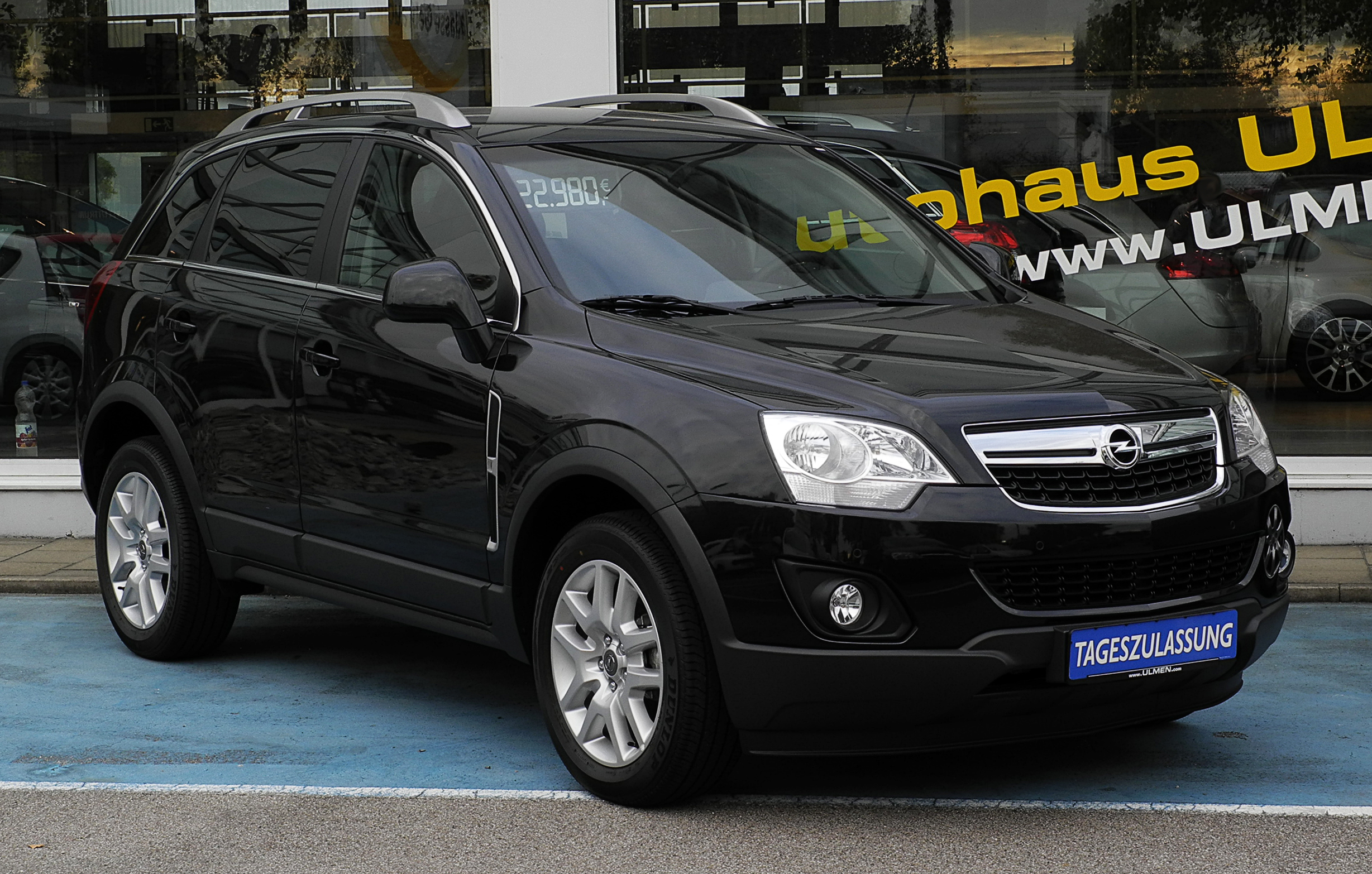
Opel Antara (facelift)

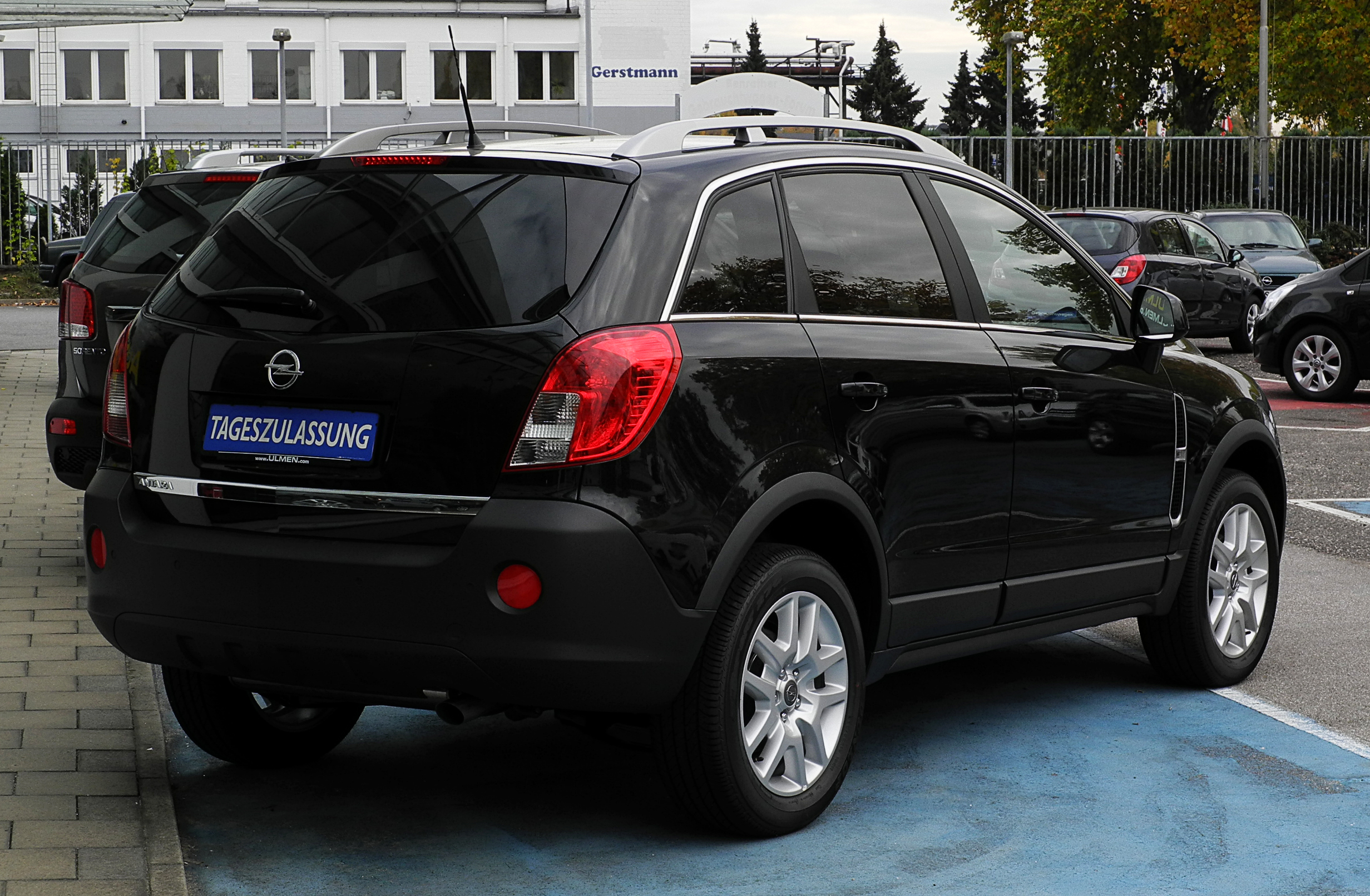
Opel Antara (facelift)

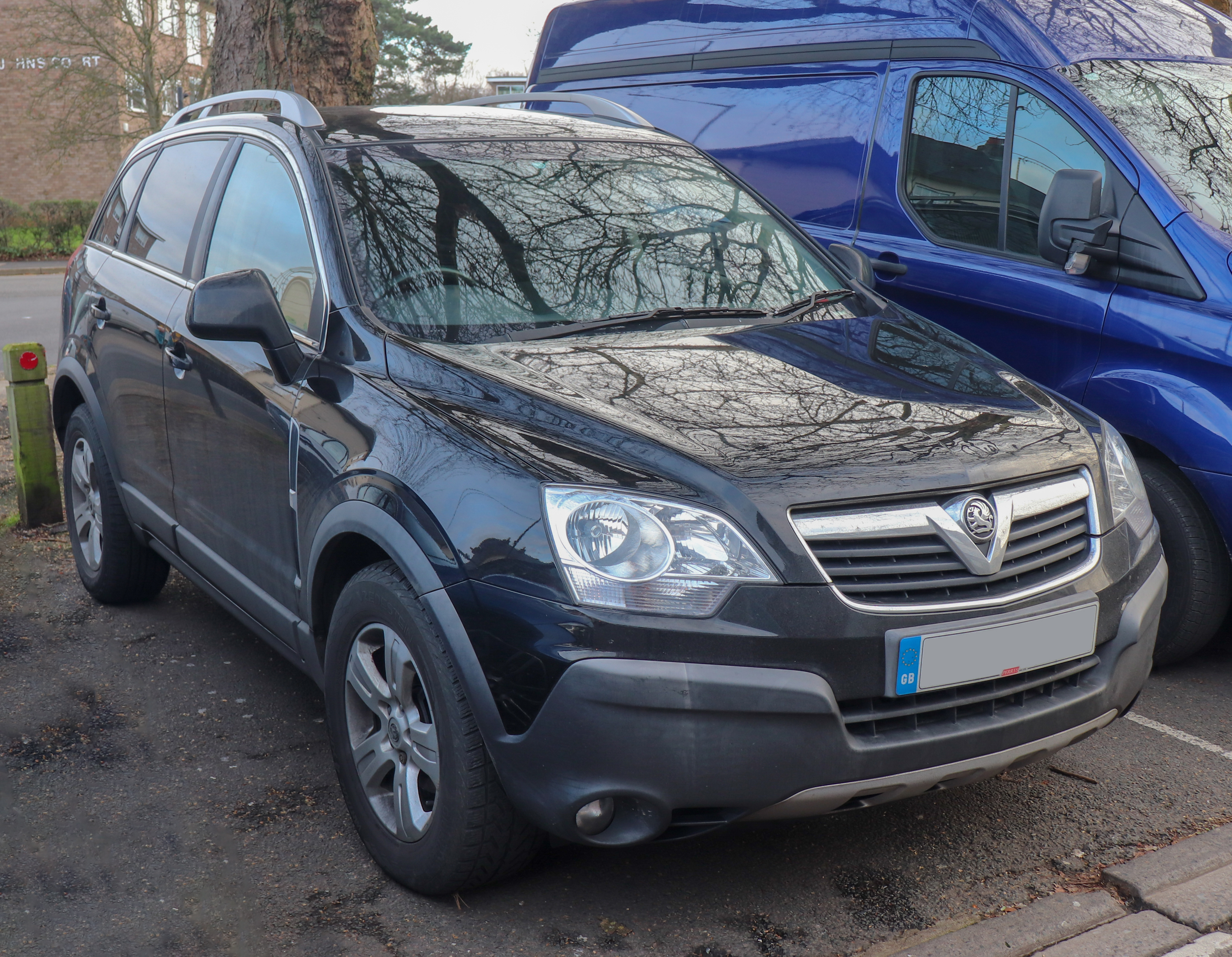
Vauxhall Antara (pre facelift)

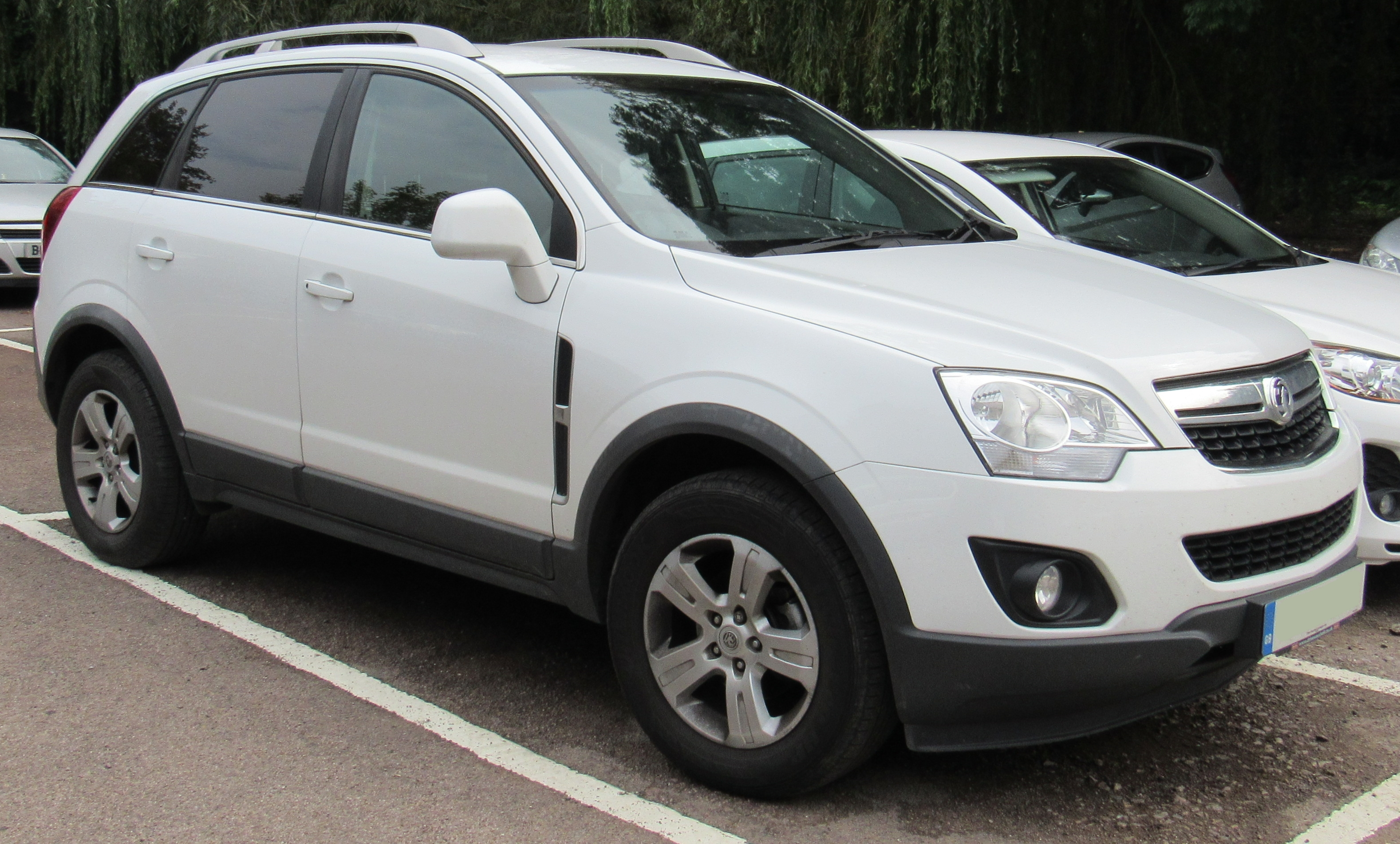
Vauxhall Antara (facelift)

== Powertrain ==
International
Model	Type	Displacement	Power	Torque	Transmission	Years
2.0 VCDi (t/c)	I4 (diesel)	1,991 cc	110 kW (148 hp)	320 N⋅m (236 lbf⋅ft)	5-speed manual 5-speed automatic	2006–2010
2.2 VCDi (t/c)	I4 (diesel)	2,231 cc	120 kW (161 hp)	350 N⋅m (258 lbf⋅ft)	6-speed manual 6-speed 6T45 automatic	2010–2015
2.2 VCDi (t/c)	I4 (diesel)	2,231 cc	135 kW (181 hp)	400 N⋅m (295 lbf⋅ft)	6-speed manual 6-speed 6T45 automatic	2010–2015
2.4 Family II	I4 (petrol)	2,405 cc	103 kW (138 hp)	220 N⋅m (162 lbf⋅ft)	5-speed manual	2006–2010
2.4 Ecotec	I4 (petrol)	2,384 cc	123 kW (165 hp)	230 N⋅m (170 lbf⋅ft)	6-speed manual 6-speed 6T40 automatic	2010–2015
3.2 High Feature	V6 (petrol)	3,195 cc	167 kW (224 hp)	297 N⋅m (219 lb⋅ft)	5-speed automatic	2006–2010
Americas
2.4 Ecotec	I4 (petrol)	2,384 cc	126 kW (169 hp)	218 N⋅m (161 lb⋅ft)	4-speed automatic	MY2008–2009
2.4 Ecotec (hybrid)	I4 (petrol)	2,384 cc	128 kW (172 hp)	226 N⋅m (167 lb⋅ft)	4-speed automatic	MY2008–2009
2.4 Ecotec	I4 (petrol)	2,384 cc	136 kW (182 hp)	233 N⋅m (172 lb⋅ft)	6-speed 6T40 automatic	MY2012–2015
3.0 High Feature	V6 (petrol)	2,997 cc	197 kW (264 hp)	301 N⋅m (222 lb⋅ft)	6-speed 6T40 automatic	MY2012–2015
3.5 High Value	V6 (petrol)	3,510 cc	166 kW (222 hp)	298 N⋅m (220 lb⋅ft)	6-speed automatic	MY2008–2009
3.6 High Feature	V6 (petrol)	3,564 cc	192 kW (257 hp)	336 N⋅m (248 lb⋅ft)	6-speed automatic	MY2008–2009
3.6 High Feature (plug in hybrid)	V6 (petrol)	3,564 cc	195 kW (262 hp)	339 N⋅m (250 lb⋅ft)	CVT 2MT70 automatic	Cancelled

== Market ==
=== Americas ===
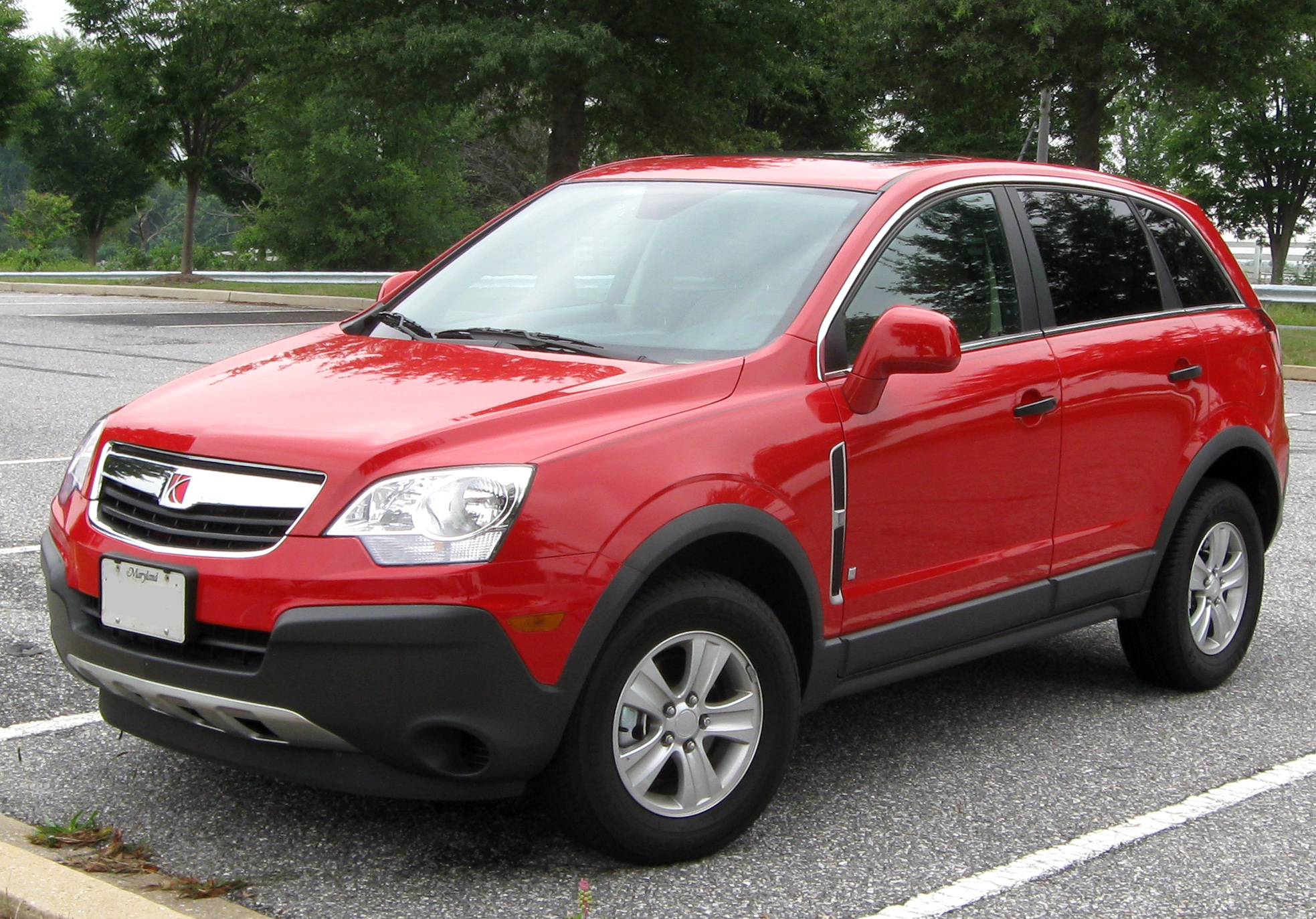
Saturn Vue XE (US)

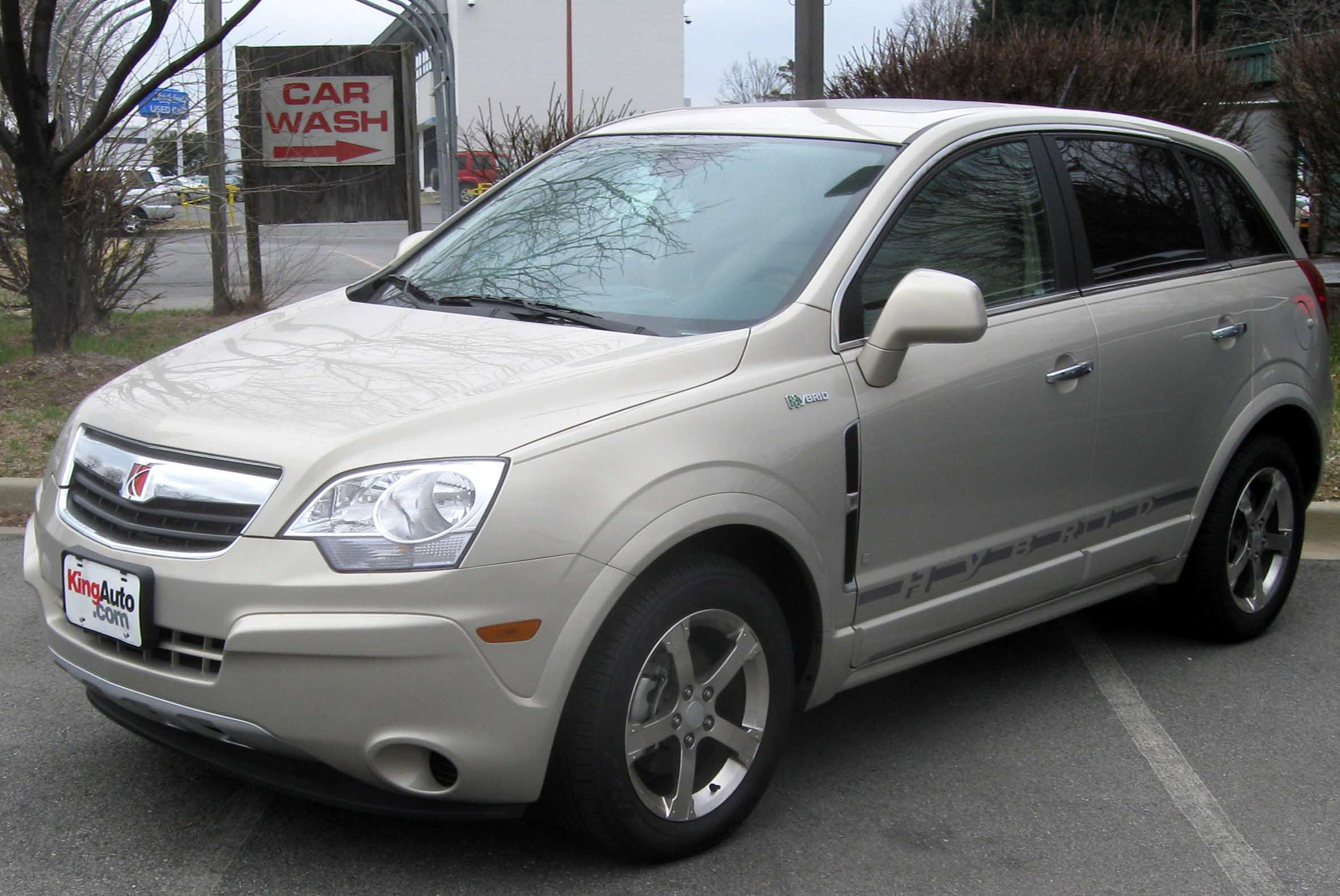
Saturn Vue Hybrid (US)

General Motors in the United States and Canada introduced the Opel Antara as part of the Saturn division under the name "Saturn Vue" in 2007 for the 2008 model year. Saturn had earlier previewed the design at the April 2006 New York International Auto Show as the "Saturn PreVue" concept, and again in production guise at the 2007 Greater Los Angeles Auto Show, held from November to December 2006.

The Antara based model represents the second iteration of the "Vue" nameplate, with production moved to Ramos Arizpe, Mexico. The Ramos Arizpe facility also supplies the Colombian, Mexican, Brazilian, and Uruguayan markets with the Antara, although it is badged "Chevrolet Captiva Sport" in these countries. In Chile, it was sold as Opel Antara from Germany and shared market with its sister Chevrolet Captiva which came from South Korea.

The Insurance Institute for Highway Safety (IIHS) awarded the model year of 2008 Vue its Top Safety Pick after receiving a good overall score in both the front and side impact tests.

Trim levels include the "XE", "XR", the sports-oriented "Red Line", and the "Green Line" hybrid. Saturn fitted the Vue with the 169 hp (126 kW) 2.4-litre Ecotec inline-four. The 222 hp (166 kW) 3.5-litre V6 and the 3.6-litre V6 rated at 257 hp (192 kW) were optional.

The "Red Line" uses the same 3.6-litre V6 from the "XR", adding several sporting changes, including manual shifting of the six-speed automatic transmission, a reduction in ride height of approximately 1-inch (25 mm), and a sport tuned suspension. Exterior appearance changes for the "Red Line" include 18-inch alloy wheels, and a more aggressive front bumper, tail lamps and exhaust tips.

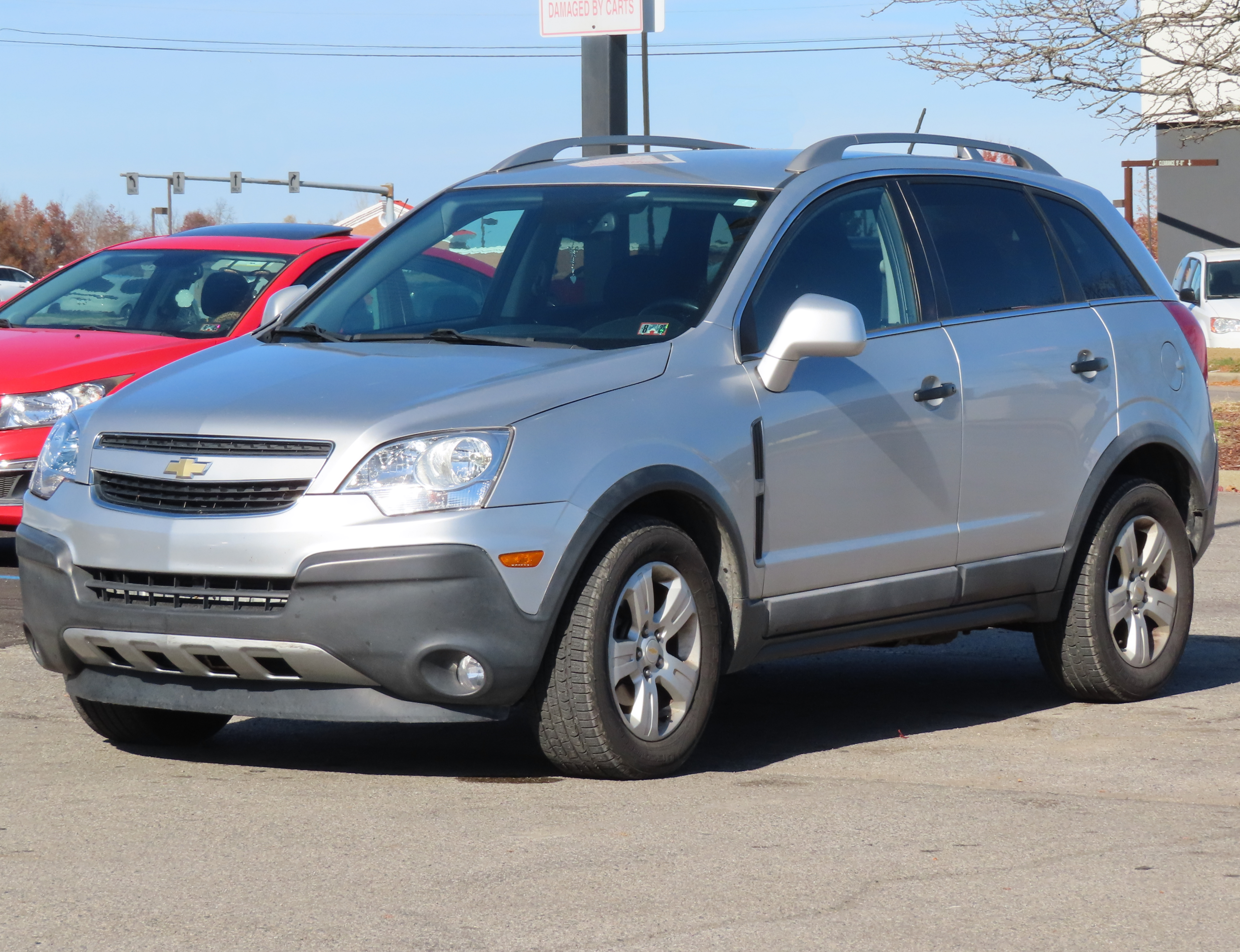
Chevrolet Captiva Sport (US)

The front-wheel-drive only "Green Line" petrol/electric hybrid uses the same mild BAS Hybrid system with the 2.4-litre engine as the first generation Vue. Software updates and optimisations have smoothed the operation while also improving fuel economy. Under the 2008 EPA standards, the Vue is listed at 25 mpg_{‑US} (9.4 L/100 km)/32 mpg_{‑US} (7.4 L/100 km) city/highway.

Saturn dropped the "Green Line" badge for 2009, in favour of the name "Hybrid". A full hybrid model featuring GM's two-mode system was to have been introduced for the 2009 year model. This would have combined with an electric motor with a direct injection version of the 3.6-litre V6 providing a combined output of 262 hp (195 kW) and 250 lb⋅ft (339 N⋅m) of torque.

This version was to have maintained the 3,500 lb (1,588 kg) towing capacity of the standard 3.6-litre variant and would have utilised the 2MT70 continuously variable automatic transmission. Saturn was also expected to release a plug-in hybrid version of the two-mode-hybrid platform for the model year of 2010.

This was to have been the first plug-in hybrid with the system offered as original equipment.

For the 2010 model year, little was changed from the previous year—the most prominent being the deletion of the "Red Line" trim and the slight gain in power output for the four-cylinder engine range. Production of the 2010 model year Vue ceased in 2009, following the closing of the Saturn brand.

This decision did not affect the assembly of the "Chevrolet Captiva Sport" for Latin and South American markets. After Saturn's demise, GM planned to retail the upcoming two-mode-hybrid Vue as a Buick for the 2011 model year. It would have included the 8 kWh lithium-ion battery pack found in the Chevrolet Volt.

GM subsequently cancelled its production plan of the Buick following negative reception, while concurrently announcing the plug-in hybrid powertrain would be transferred to another vehicle during 2011.

In late 2011, for the 2012 model year, the Mexico-built Chevrolet Captiva Sport was imported into the United States for fleet buyers. This decision was made to fill the void for fleet buyers as Chevrolet phased out the HHR. The Captiva Sport was available with a 2.4-litre inline-four (LS trim) or 3.0-litre V6 (LT and LTZ), with both engines mated to a six-speed automatic transmission. LS and LT trims came with front-wheel drive while the LTZ trim came with all-wheel drive.

For the 2013 model year, the V6 and all-wheel drive were dropped; the only drivetrain option in the United States was the 2.4-litre inline-four with front-wheel drive.

The Captiva Sport was discontinued in the United States in August 2014 after an abbreviated 2015 model year, as Chevrolet directed fleet buyers to the Equinox SUV or the new City Express van instead. The Captiva Sport was also discontinued in Mexico around October 2015 after the reintroduction of the Chevrolet Equinox. Although the Captiva Sport was discontinued in Mexico, the Ramos Arizpe facility continued to assemble it for the other Latin American markets until 2017 when it was replaced by the third-generation Equinox.

=== Australia ===
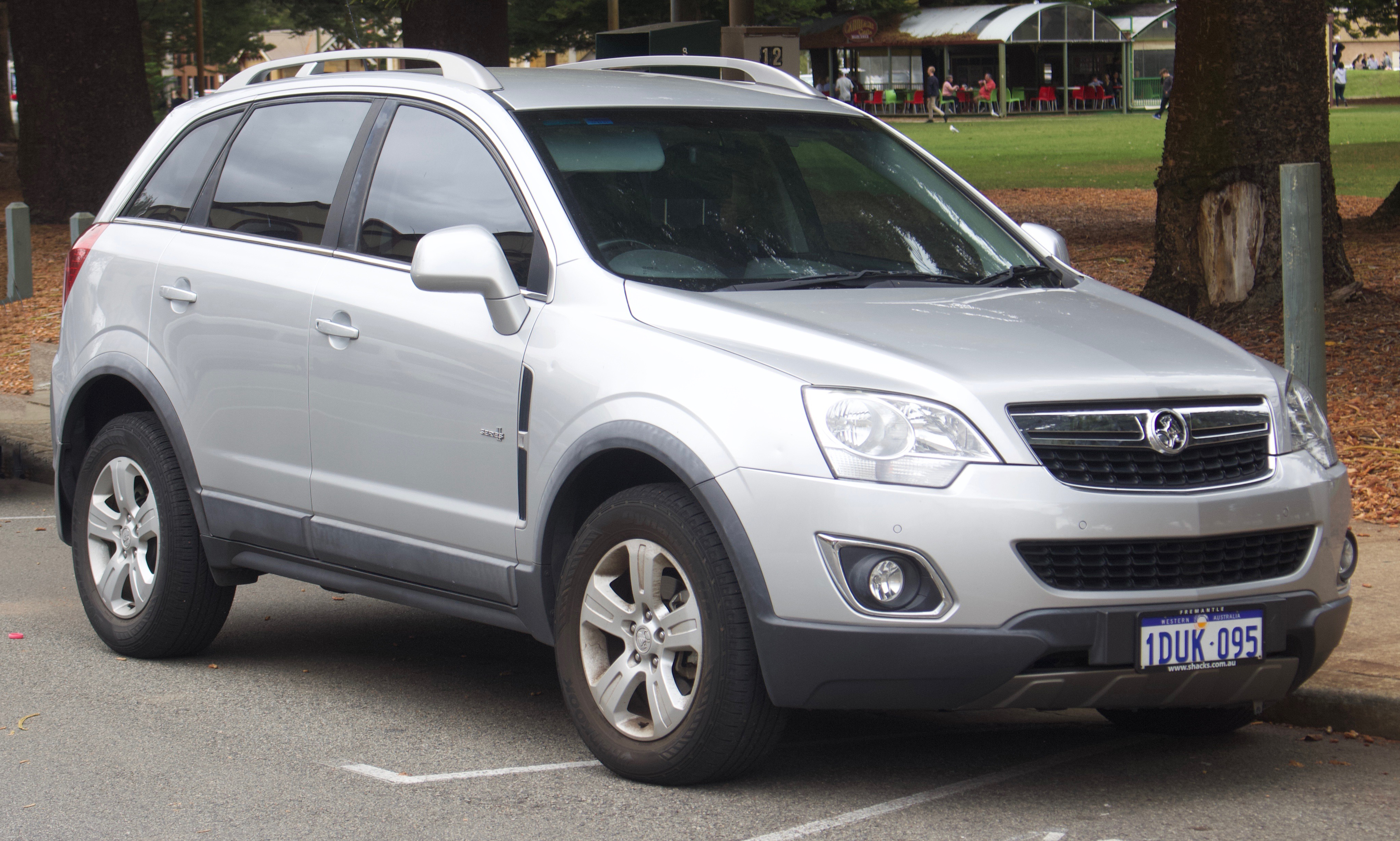
Holden Captiva 5 (Series II)

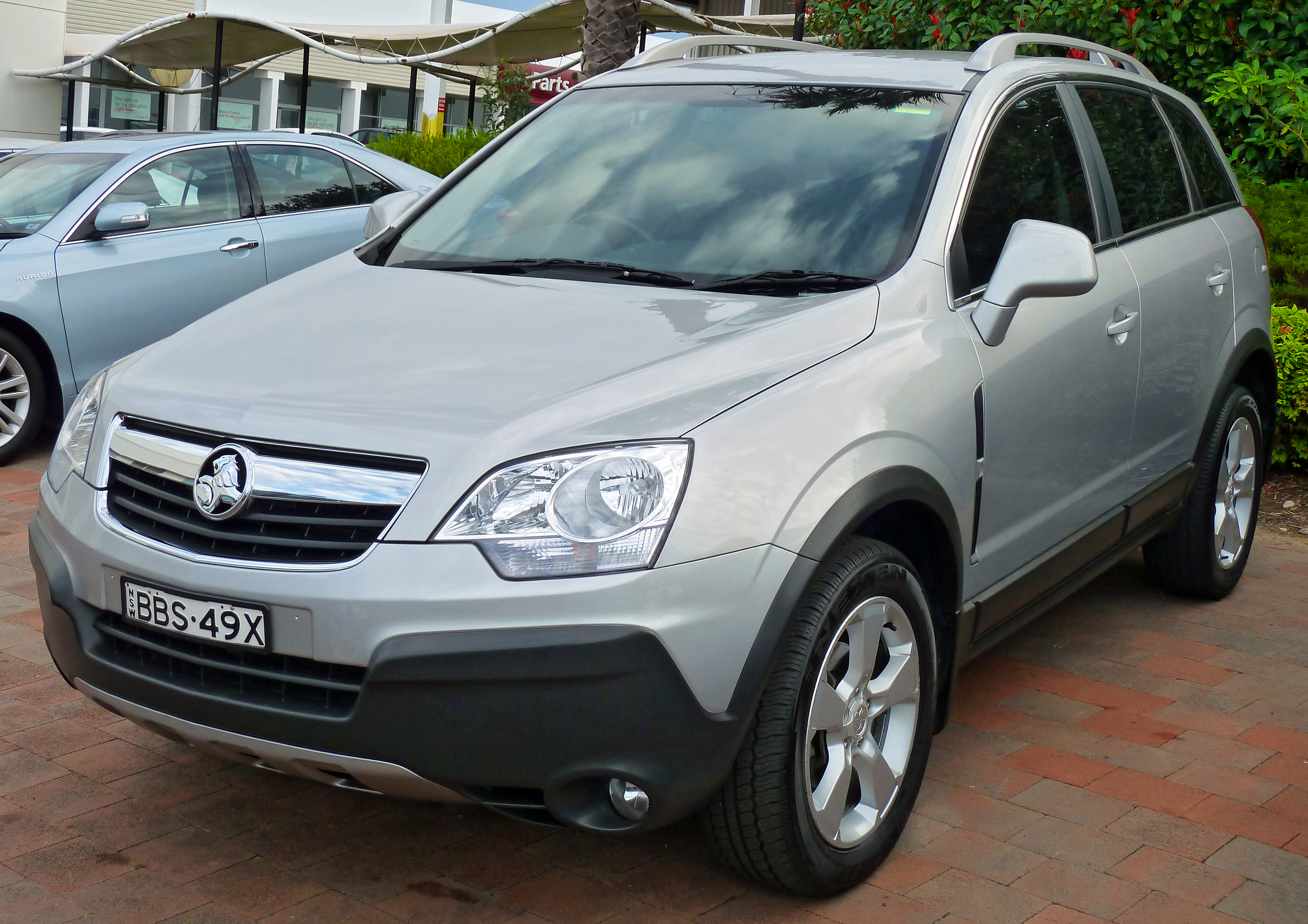
Holden Captiva MaXX

The market in Australia received the Antara as part of the range of the Holden Captiva from 2006 until October 2015. When introduced in November 2006 after being announced the previous September, the Antara-based Holden was known as the "Captiva MaXX", selling alongside the cheaper Chevrolet Captiva based Holden models.

It was offered with a single powertrain, a five-speed automatic equipped 3.2-litre V6. The MaXX remained on sale in Australia until 2008, although New Zealand sales continued until the end of 2009.

In a reversal of the Antara based Captiva's previous market position, Holden in December 2009 reintroduced the model as the price leading five-seater "Captiva 5", while the more expensive Chevrolet-based seven-seat-only models were rebranded "Captiva 7".

Holden fitted the Captiva 5 with the 2.4-litre petrol engine only. Front-wheel-drive models employed the five-speed manual transmission only, with the five-speed automatic variant tendered only in conjunction with all wheel drive.

Series II revisions were announced for Captiva 5 in February 2011, with sales commencing in March. The changes included the implementation of the facelift, including a new mesh grille insert with thin air intakes, chrome bezelled fog lamps, and new tail lamp lenses. The Series II Captiva 5 also gained updated powertrains, with an uprated 2.4-litre inline-four petrol engine, and the 135 kW (181 hp) 2.2-litre turbo diesel.

Six-speed manual and automatic transmissions are fitted with the petrol engine, with diesel available only with the six-speed automatic.
