= Altezza lights =

Vehicle tail lamp clusters

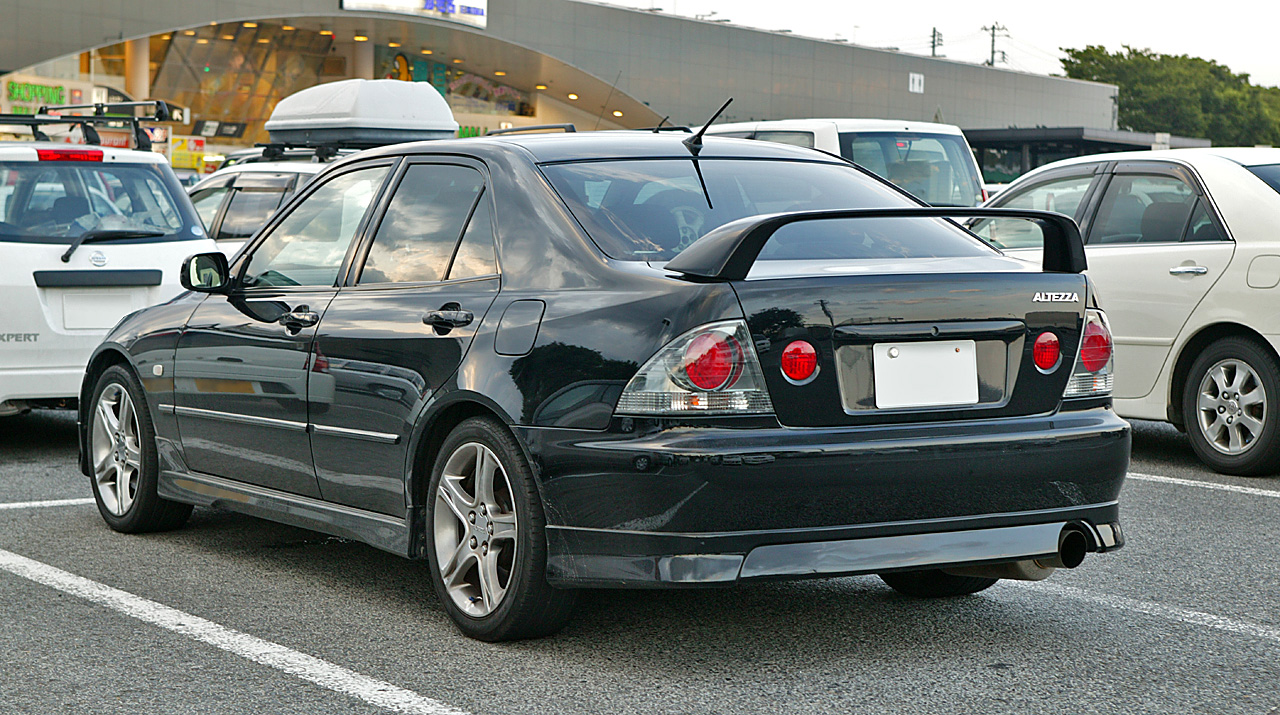
The origin of true Altezza lights, the Toyota Altezza.

Altezza lights (also known as Lexus lights, Euro lights, crystal lights, or clear lights) are vehicle tail lamp clusters consisting of one or more internal lamp units, covered with a clear (or tinted) acrylic cover. This style of taillight was made popular by Lexus and has been stock equipment on Toyota Altezza, Lexus IS300 and IS200 models since 1998. Some Altezza lights also use LED lighting.

== Origin ==
The style was first used on the rear light clusters of the Toyota Altezza in 1998, which was sold elsewhere in the world months later as the Lexus IS. Prior to the release of the Altezza, the Toyota Supra Mark IV also used an encased tail lamp assembly in gun-metal grey that is sometimes credited with starting the trend. The Mark I Altezza taillight housing was finished in chrome.

Altezza lights are commonly installed as an aftermarket part on modified cars, and the styling cues of the rear light clusters were also copied by a number of other vehicles and car manufacturers. This includes cars like the first generation Mazda6, the Toyota Prius C, third and fourth generation Nissan Altima, second and third generation Subaru Impreza hatchback and second generation sedan, second generation Chevrolet Aveo sedan, 2011–2016 Honda Brio, and 2007–2016 Mitsubishi Lancer. It is also seen on SUVs such as the fourth generation Mitsubishi Pajero, first and second generation Lexus RX, 2003–2006 Indonesian-built first generation Nissan Terrano and 2011–2015 Toyota Fortuner.
