= GM Family Z engine =

Family Z engine

Overview
- Manufacturer: General Motors
- Production: 2010-2015

Layout
- Configuration: Inline-4
- Displacement: 2.0 L; 121.9 cu in (1,998 cc); 2.2 L; 136.1 cu in (2,231 cc)
- Cylinder bore: 86 mm (3.39 in)
- Piston stroke: 86 mm (3.39 in); 96 mm (3.78 in)
- Cylinder block material: Cast iron
- Cylinder head material: Aluminum
- Valvetrain: DOHC
- Compression ratio: 16.3:1, 16.5:1

Combustion
- Turbocharger: Variable-geometry
- Fuel system: Common rail direct injection
- Fuel type: Diesel
- Oil system: Wet sump
- Cooling system: Water-cooled

Output
- Power output: 96–135 kW (131–184 PS; 129–181 hp)
- Torque output: 315–400 N⋅m (232–295 lb⋅ft)

Chronology
- Predecessor: VM Motori RA 420
- Successor: GM Family B engine

The GM Family Z engine is a turbocharged common rail diesel engine produced by General Motors Korea since 2010. It replaced VM Motori RA 420 diesel engine in a number of GM applications, such as the diesel versions of vehicles sold as Chevrolet made for North America, Daewoo made for Korea, Opel made for Europe and Holden made for Australia.

The engine features chain driven DOHC valvetrain with hydraulic tensioners, twin balance shafts in the oil pump and electronically controlled variable-geometry turbocharger; the common rail system operates at pressures of up to 1,800 bar (26,000 psi), maximum in-cylinder pressure is 180 bar (2,600 psi), improving on power and torque. Compression ratio is 16.5:1.

For 2012, compression ration is reduced to 16.3:1, and a new intake port increases air flow and swirl control, improving nitrogen oxide (NO_{x}) emissions and performance.

== Chevrolet Captiva/Opel Antara ==
Displacement	Power	Torque	Code/RPO	Years
2.0 L (1,998 cc) VCDi	120 kW (163 PS; 161 hp) at 3800 rpm	360 N⋅m (266 lb⋅ft) at 2000 rpm	Z20D1, LNP	2011–2015 (Chevrolet); 2010-2013 (Opel)
2.2 L (2,231 cc) VCDi	120 kW (163 PS; 161 hp) at 3800 rpm	360 N⋅m (266 lb⋅ft) at 2000 rpm	A22DM, LNQ/LNR	2011–2015 (Chevrolet); 2010-2013 (Opel)
2.2 L (2,231 cc) VCDi	135 kW (184 PS; 181 hp) at 3800 rpm	400 N⋅m (295 lb⋅ft) at 2000 rpm	A22DMH, LNQ/LNS	2011–2015 (Chevrolet); 2010-2013 (Opel)

== Chevrolet Cruze ==
Displacement	Power	Torque	Years
2.0 L (1,998 cc) VCDi	120 kW (163 PS; 161 hp) @ 3800 rpm	360 N⋅m (266 lb⋅ft) @ 1750-2750 rpm	2011–2015

== Chevrolet Malibu ==
Displacement	Power	Torque	Years
2.0 L (1,998 cc) VCDi	120 kW (163 PS; 161 hp) @ 4000 rpm	350 N⋅m (258 lb⋅ft) @ 1750 rpm	2012–2015

== Chevrolet Orlando ==
Displacement	Power	Torque	Years
2.0 L (1,998 cc) VCDi	120 kW (163 PS; 161 hp) @ 3800 rpm	350 N⋅m (258 lb⋅ft) @ 2000 rpm	2012–2015
2.0 L (1,998 cc) VCDi	96 kW (131 PS; 129 hp) @ 3800 rpm	315 N⋅m (232 lb⋅ft) @ 2000 rpm	2012–2015
