= Daewoo Tosca =

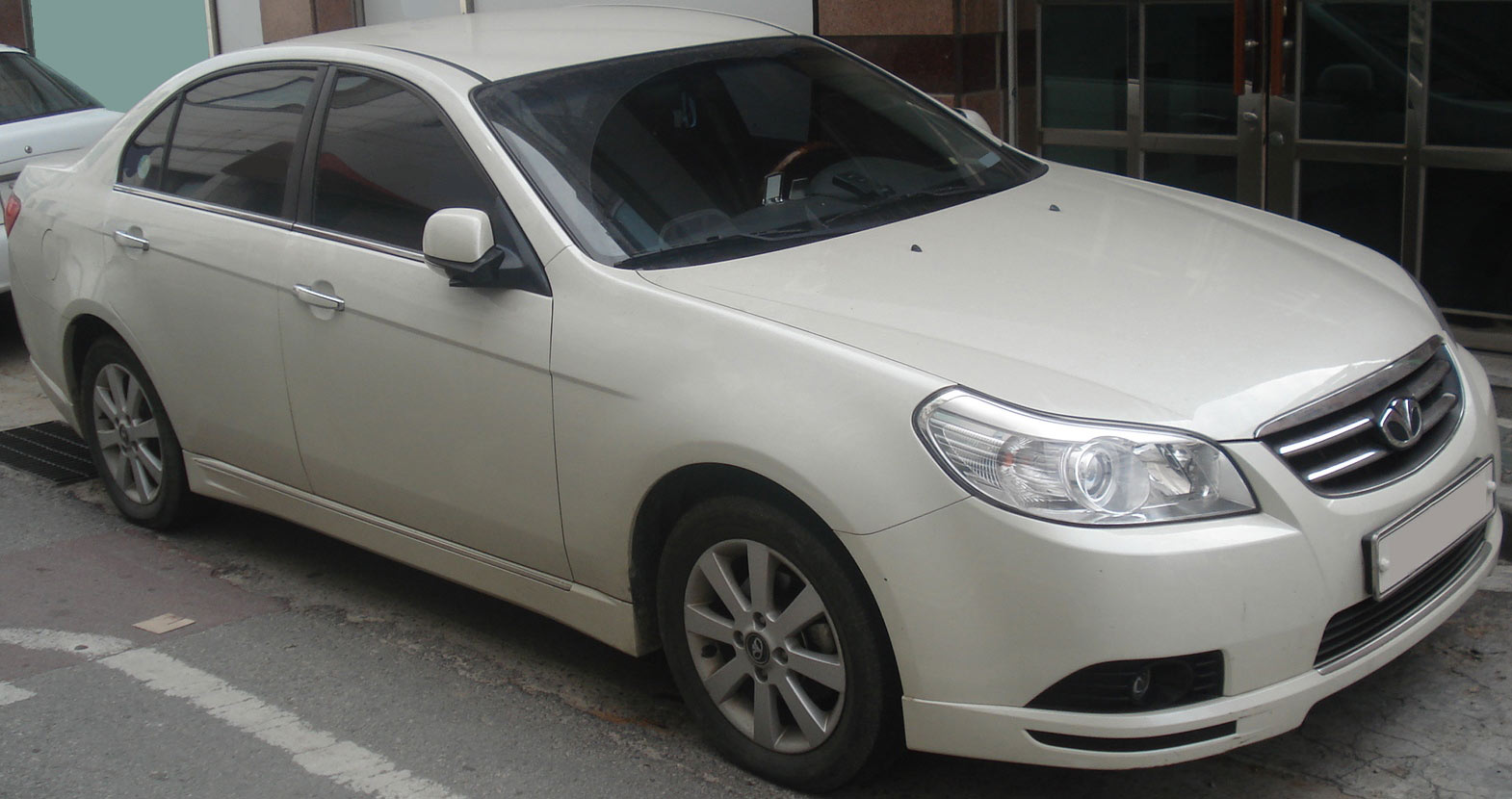

Overview
- Manufacturer: Daewoo (General Motors)
- Also called: Chevrolet Epica; Chevrolet Tosca; Holden Epica
- Production: 2006–2011 (South Korea); 2007–2014 (China)
- Model years: 2006–2011 (Europe & South Korea); 2007–2015 (China)
- Assembly: Bupyeong-gu, Incheon, South Korea; Ust-Kamenogorsk, Kazakhstan; Asaka, Uzbekistan (GM Uzbekistan); Shanghai, China (Shanghai GM); Kaliningrad, Russia
- Designer: Sung Paik at General Motors Design Center

Body and chassis
- Class: Mid-size (D-segment)
- Body style: 4-door sedan
- Layout: Transverse front-engine, front-wheel drive

Powertrain
- Engine: 1.8 L Family II I4 (petrol); 2.0 L L34 I4 (gasoline); 2.0 L RA 420 SOHC I4 (turbocharged diesel); 2.0 L Daewoo XK I6 (petrol); 2.5 L Daewoo XK I6 (petrol)
- Transmission: 4-speed Aisin 81-40LE automatic 5-speed Aisin AF33 automatic 6-speed GM 6T40 automatic 6-speed GM 6T45 automatic 5-speed GMDAT D24 manual

Dimensions
- Wheelbase: 2,700 mm (110 in)
- Length: 4,805 mm (189.2 in)
- Width: 1,810 mm (71 in)
- Height: 1,450 mm (57 in)

Chronology
- Predecessor: Daewoo Magnus
- Successor: Chevrolet Malibu

The Daewoo Tosca is a mid-size car designed by Daewoo in South Korea and marketed by Chevrolet as the Chevrolet Epica and Chevrolet Tosca, while Holden marketed it as the Holden Epica. Codenamed V250, it replaces the Daewoo Magnus and its derivatives. The Chevrolet Epica was officially launched in Europe at the 2006 Geneva Motor Show. The Tosca is noteworthy in that it was available with transversely-mounted straight-six engines. Contrary to the preceding models (V100 Leganza and V200 Magnus), which were styled by Giugiaro, the V250 was designed entirely in-house.

Due to the Daewoo brand being renamed as Chevrolet for South Korea, the Daewoo Tosca ended production in early 2011 in South Korea. Production in China started in March 2007 and ended in 2014. Tosca was replaced by the Chevrolet Malibu which entered production in South Korea for the first time.

== Name ==
GM Daewoo's official press releases says that Tosca is an acronym for "Tomorrow Should Come Always". "Tosca" is also a popular opera by Giacomo Puccini. The "Chevrolet Epica" name was previously used on V200 Daewoo Magnus models sold in Canada, Latin America, China, Europe, Arabia and Micronesia. Since April 2007, the Tosca has been marketed as the Holden Epica for the Australian and New Zealand markets, replacing the Holden Vectra sourced from Opel in Germany. Holden dropped the Epica in 2011 due to weak sales. It is also manufactured and sold in Kazakhstan as Chevrolet Epica since June 2007. Models in Iceland are badged "Chevrolet Tosca".

== Powertrains ==
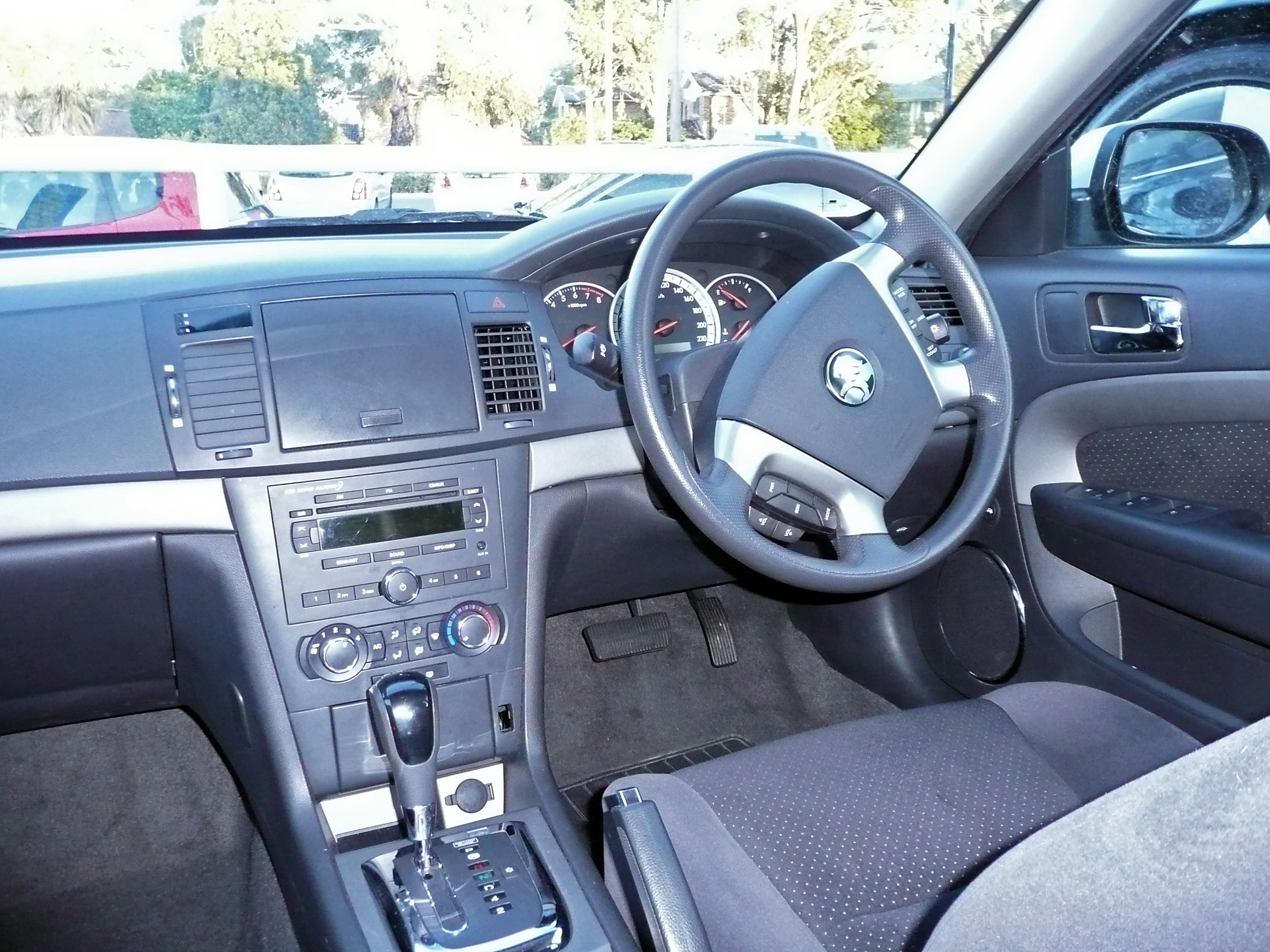
Interior of a Holden badged version

Daewoo's XK straight-six engines were designed by Porsche, and they are what distinguish the Tosca from other similar vehicles. The V250 is a front-wheel drive car and the engines are mounted transversely; this configuration requires the straight-six engine to be very compact and packed quite tight. The Tosca was launched with two versions of the straight-six of different displacements: the 2.5-litre, which was carried over from the Magnus, and a 2.0-litre, which replaces the Holden-sourced 2.0-litre D-TEC used in the previous model. Since 2006, a 1.8-litre version of the D-TEC engine model is also available in the South Korean market. This engine is coupled to either a five-speed manual or four-speed automatic transmission.

GM also announced that in early 2007 these engines will be joined by a 2.0-litre RA 420 SOHC straight-four common rail turbodiesel, producing 112 kW (150 hp) and 320 N⋅m (236 lb⋅ft) of torque. The engine, co-developed by GM Powertrain, GM Daewoo, and VM Motori, debuted in the Daewoo Winstorm, and was the first diesel engine used in a Daewoo car. In early 2008, Daewoo launched an updated version of Tosca with a new six-speed automatic transmission in South Korea. There are two versions of six-speed automatic transmission: GM 6T40 for the 2.0 and 2.5-litre petrol engines and GM 6T45 for the 2.0-litre Diesel engine. At the same time, Daewoo also revised rear portion of the car, changing the rear combination lamp and rear bumper.

Engine	Power	Torque	Transmission
1.8 L D-TEC I4	90 kW (121 hp)	165 N⋅m (122 lb⋅ft)	5-speed GMDAT D24 manual; 4-speed Aisin 81-40LE automatic
1991 cc RA 420 SOHC I4 (turbodiesel)	110 kW (148 hp)	320 N⋅m (236 lb⋅ft)	5-speed GMDAT D24 manual; 5-speed Aisin AF33 automatic; 6-speed GM 6T40 automatic
1993 cc L34 I4 (U20SED) (CHINA 2006–2009)	104 kW (139 hp)	195 N⋅m (144 lb⋅ft)	5-speed GMDAT D24 manual; 5-speed Aisin AF33 automatic; 6-speed GM 6T40 automatic
2492 cc XK I6	115 kW (154 hp)	237 N⋅m (175 lb⋅ft)	5-speed Aisin AF33 automatic; 6-speed GM 6T45 automatic

(Source: Jarosław Maznas (June 2006). "A teraz Epica". Auto Motor i Sport (in Polish). pp. 50–51.)

== Safety ==
ANCAP test results* Holden Viva variant(s) as tested (2007)
Test	Score
Overall	4 /5 stars
Frontal offset	8.91/16
Side impact	14.50/16
Pole	2/2
Seat belt reminders	1/3
Whiplash protection	Not Assessed
Pedestrian protection	Marginal
Electronic stability control	Not Assessed

ANCAP test results* Holden Viva variant(s) as tested (2008)
Test	Score
Overall	4 /5 stars
Frontal offset	8.91/16
Side impact	14.50/16
Pole	2/2
Seat belt reminders	1/3
Whiplash protection	Not Assessed
Pedestrian protection	Marginal
Electronic stability control	Standard

== Gallery ==
Pre-facelift styling

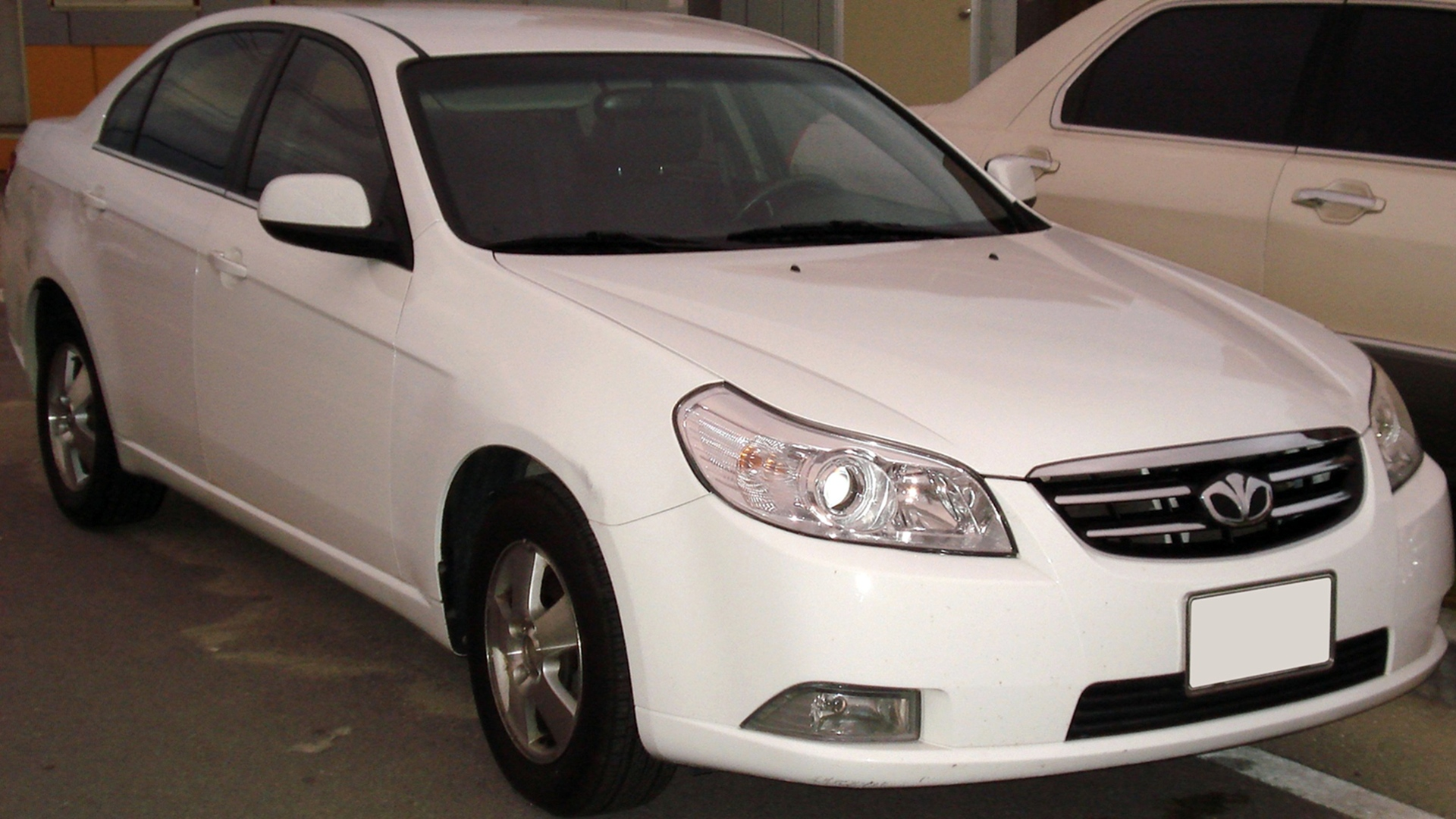
Daewoo Tosca (South Korea)

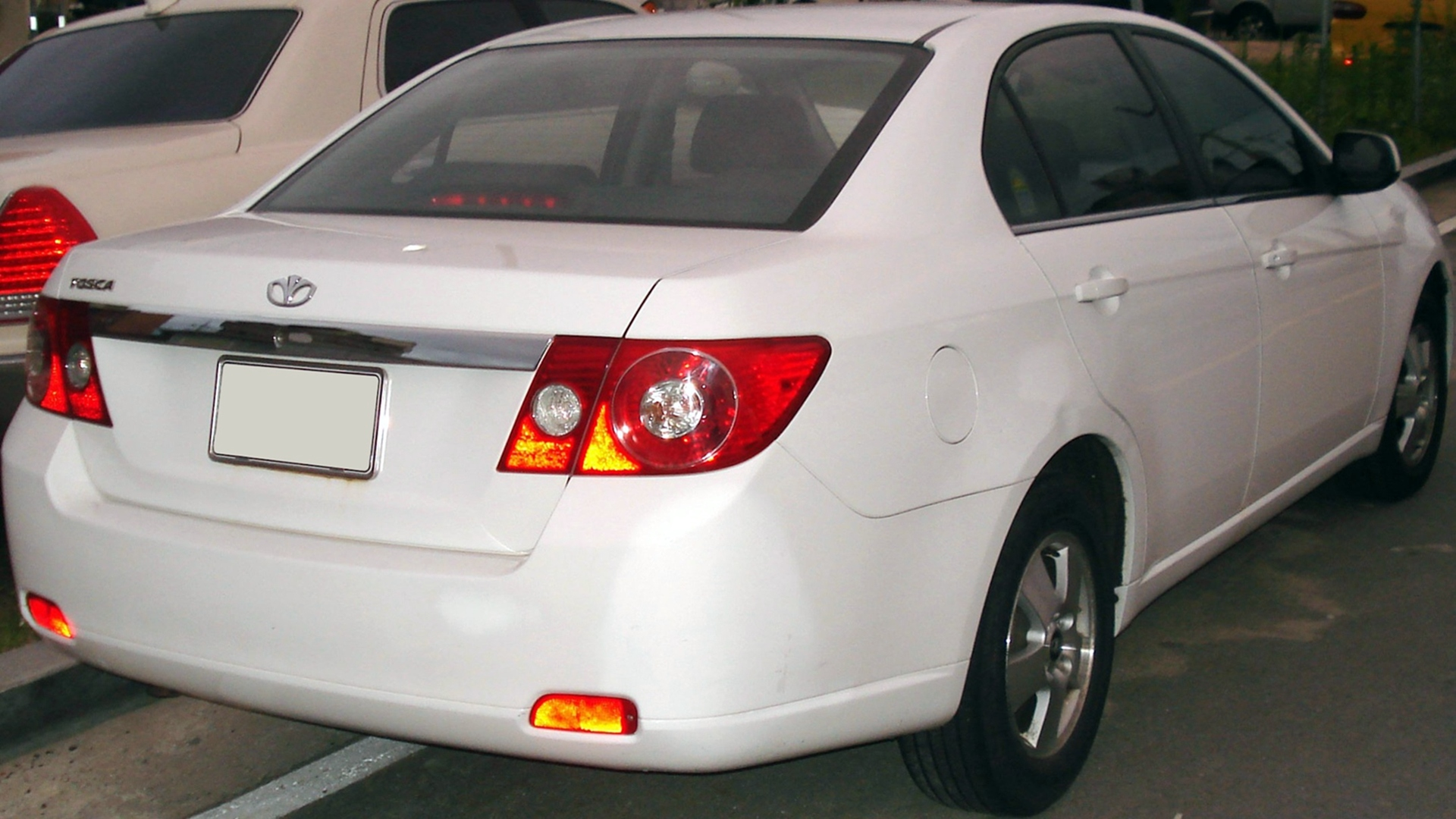
Daewoo Tosca (South Korea)

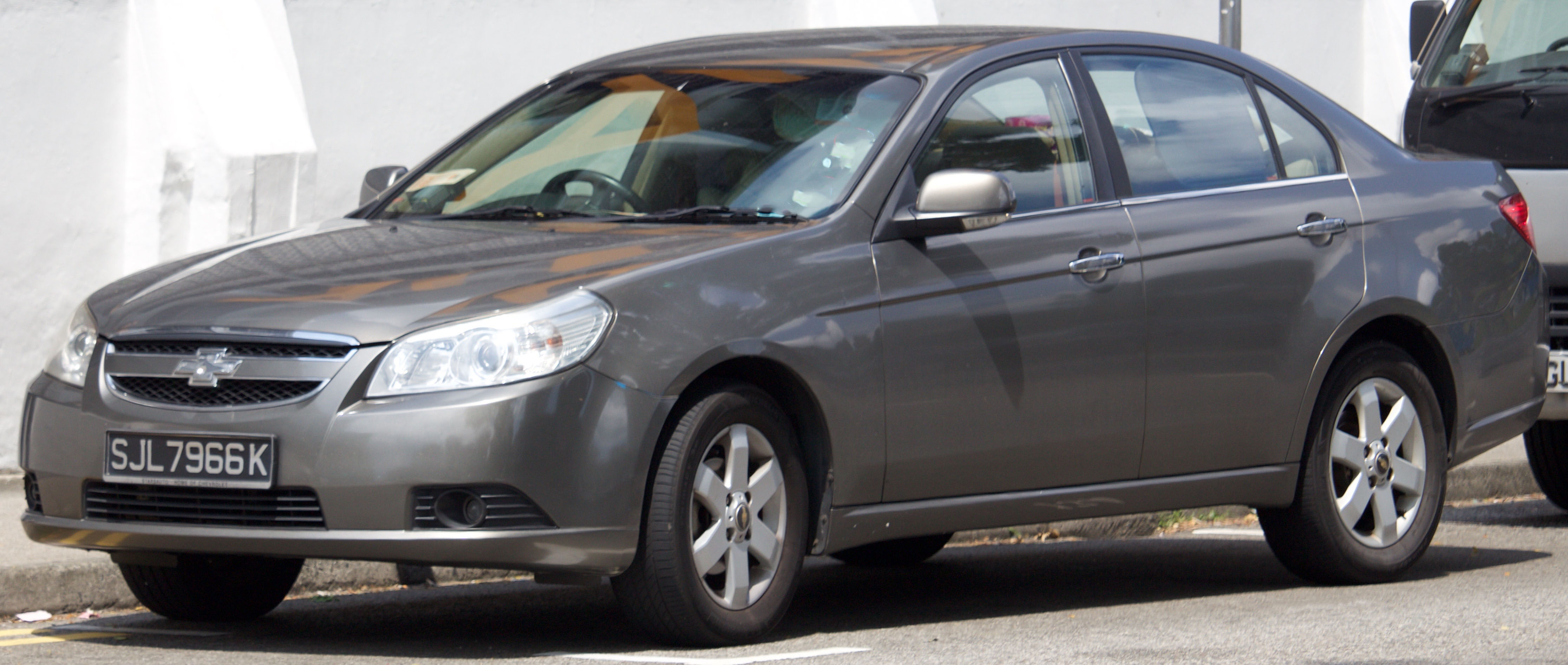
Chevrolet Epica (Singapore)

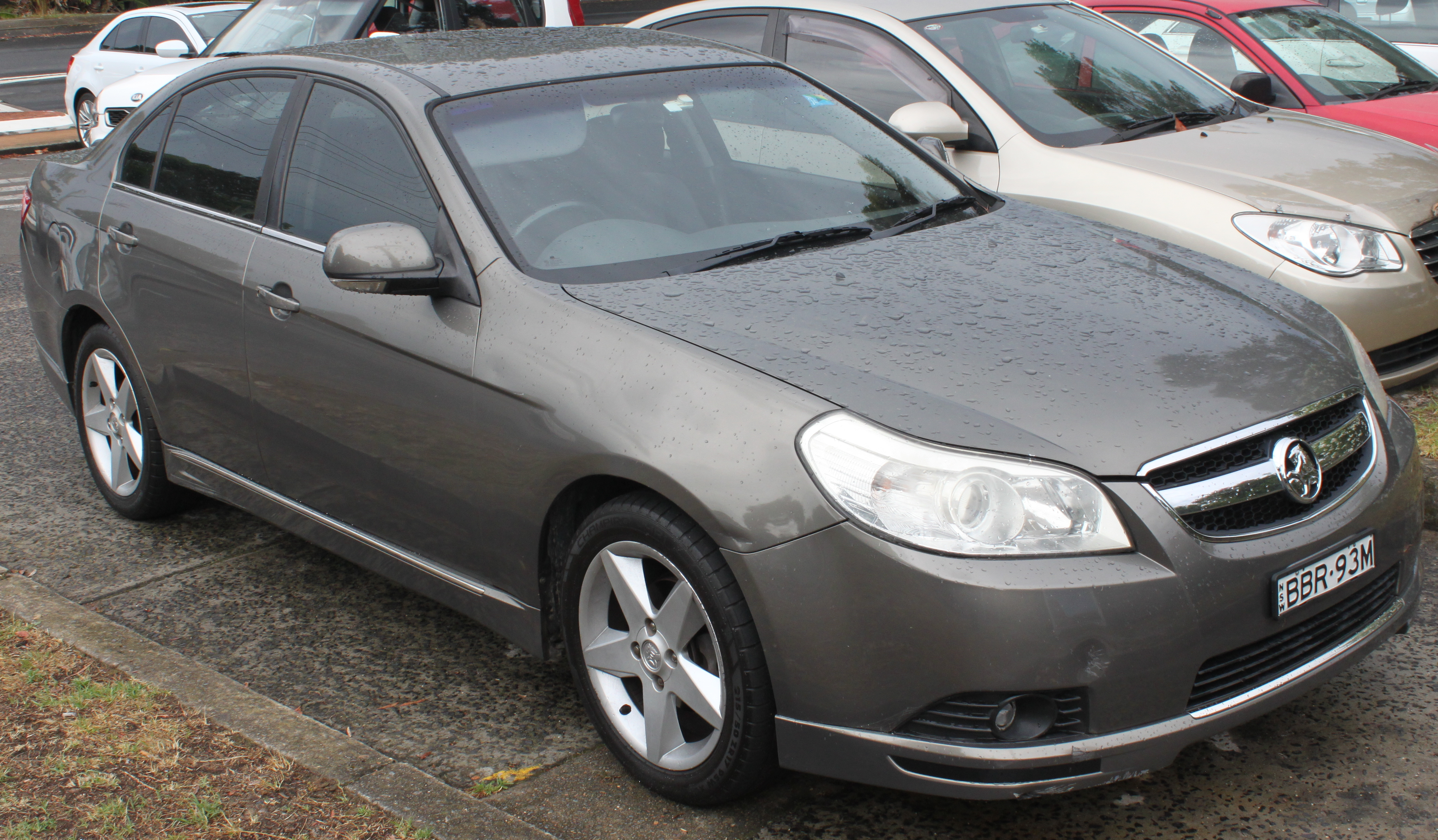
Holden Epica (Australia)

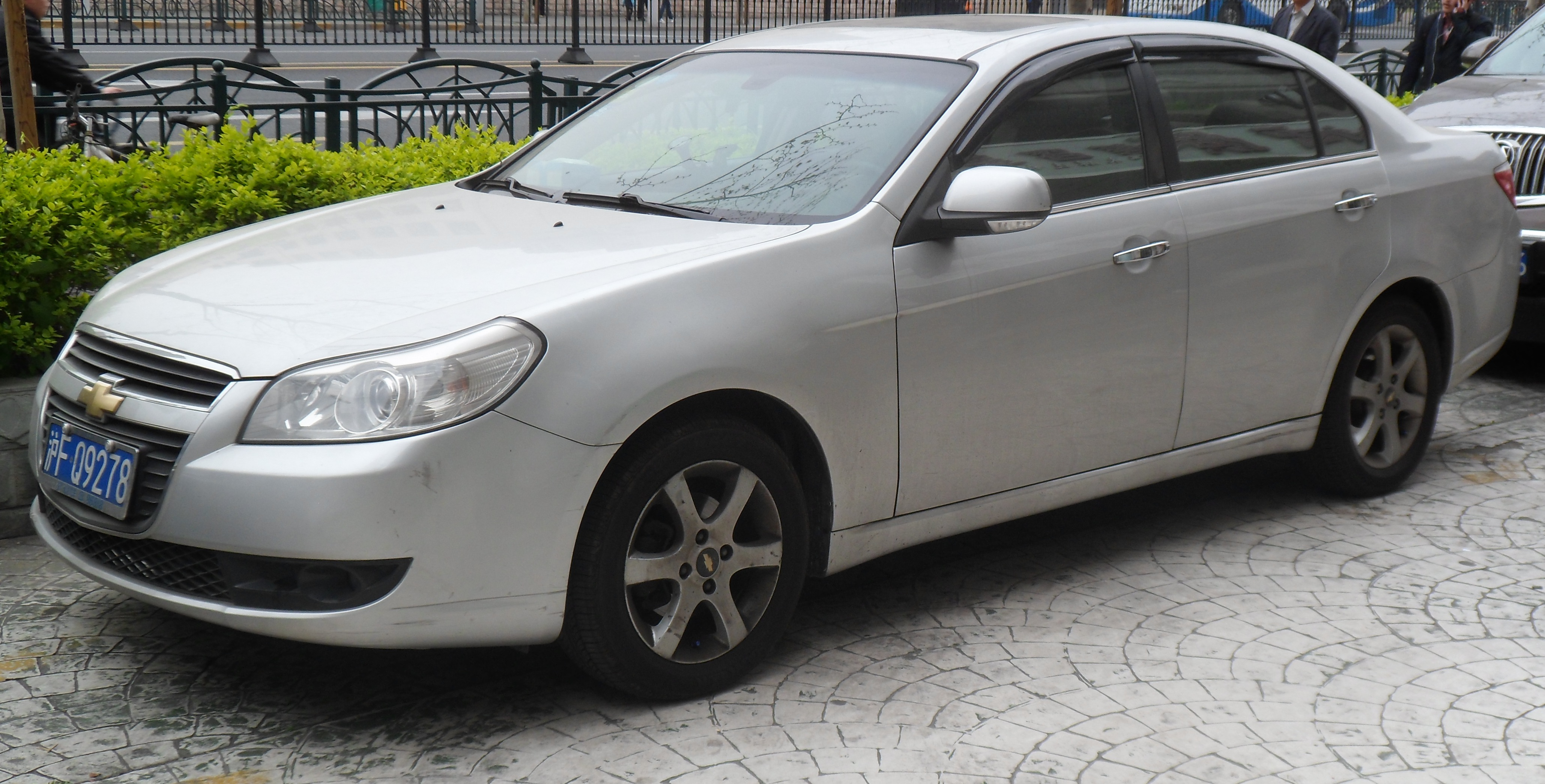
2007–2009 Chevrolet Epica (China)

Post-facelift styling

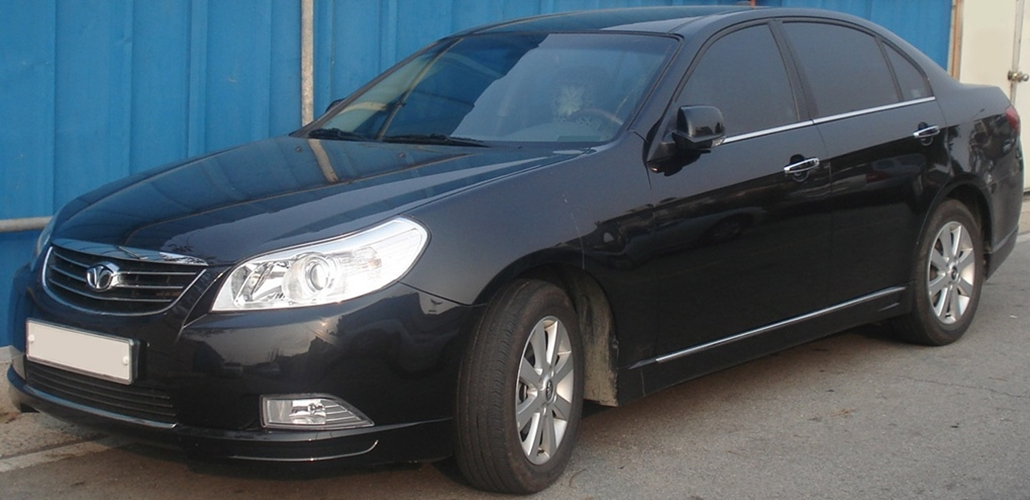
Daewoo Tosca (South Korea; facelift)

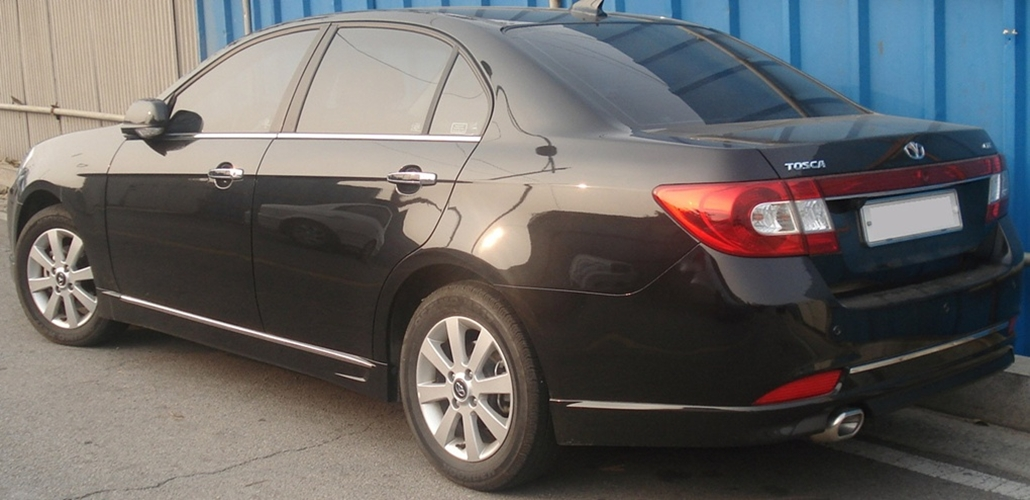
Daewoo Tosca (South Korea; facelift)

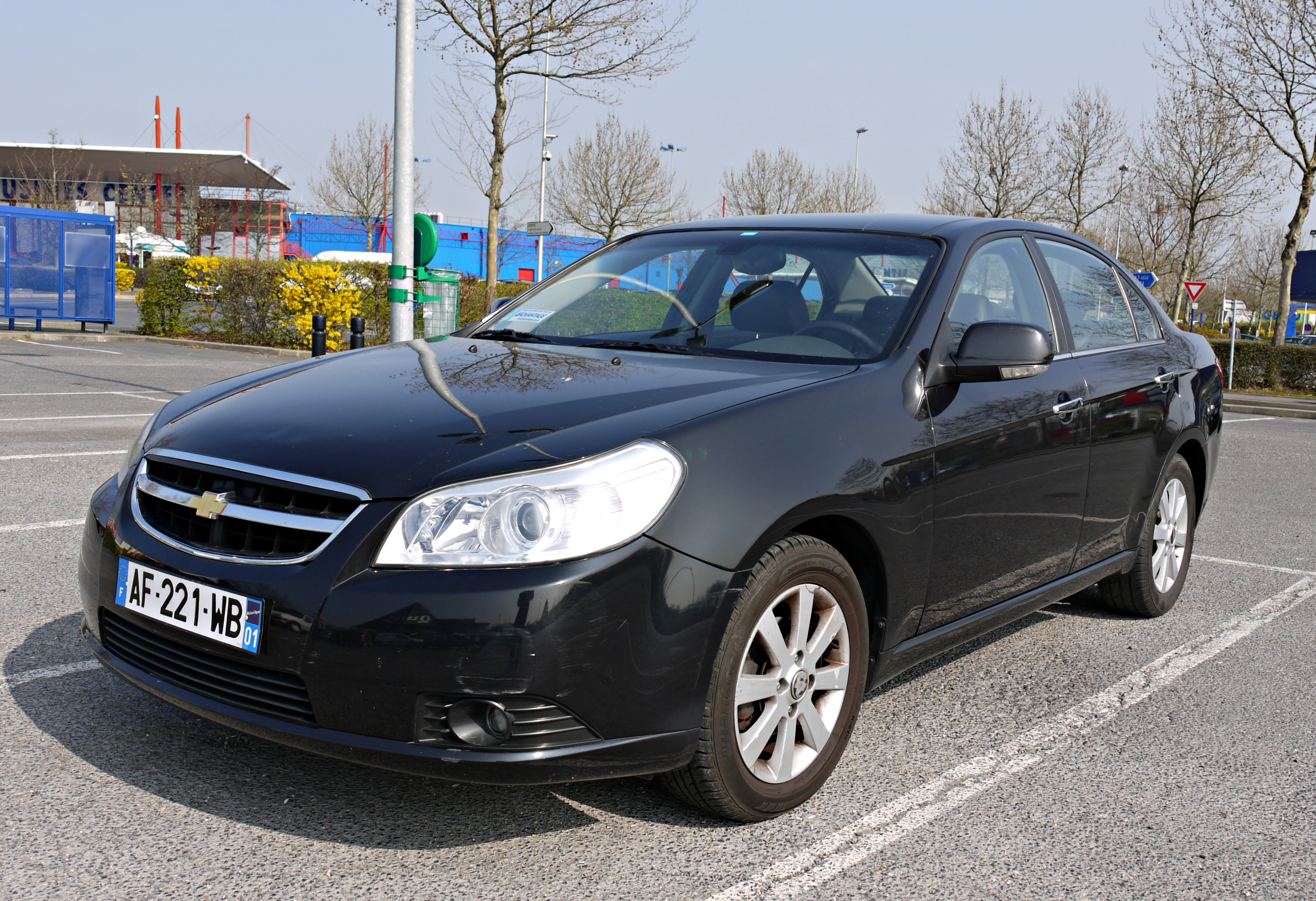
Chevrolet Epica (France; facelift)

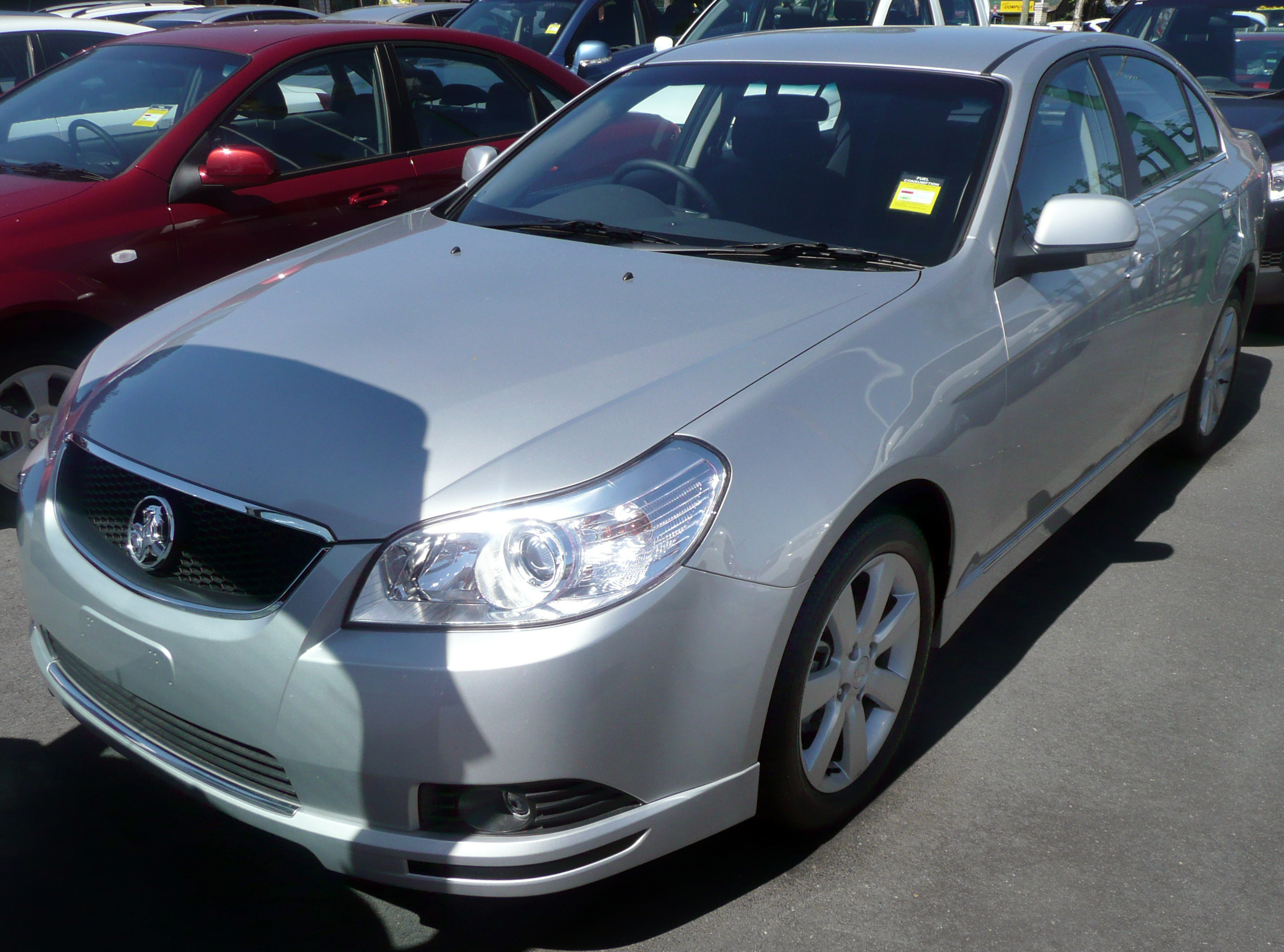
Holden Epica (Australia; facelift)

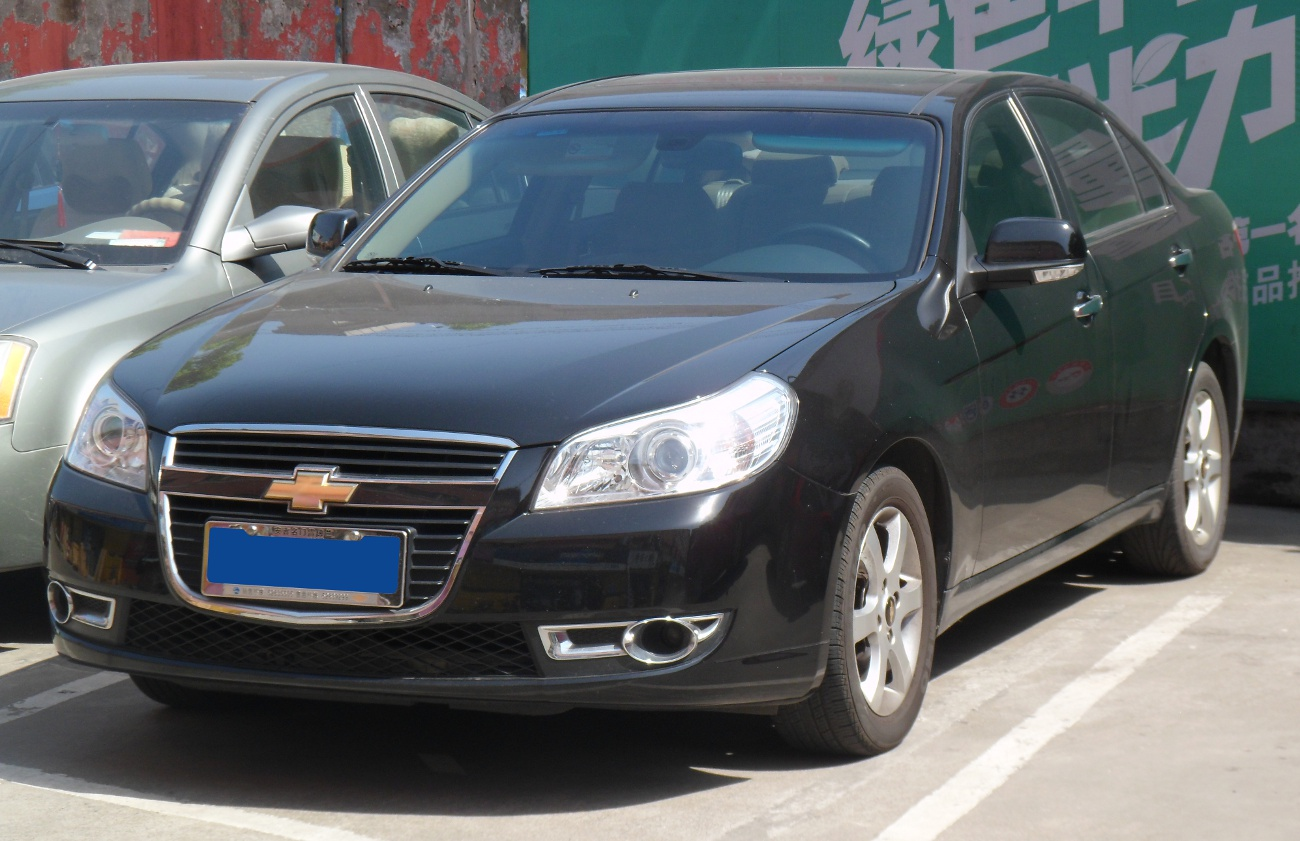
2010–2012 Chevrolet Epica (China)

2013–2015 Chevrolet Epica (China)
