= Daewoo Magnus =

Mid-size sedan

Daewoo Magnus (V200)
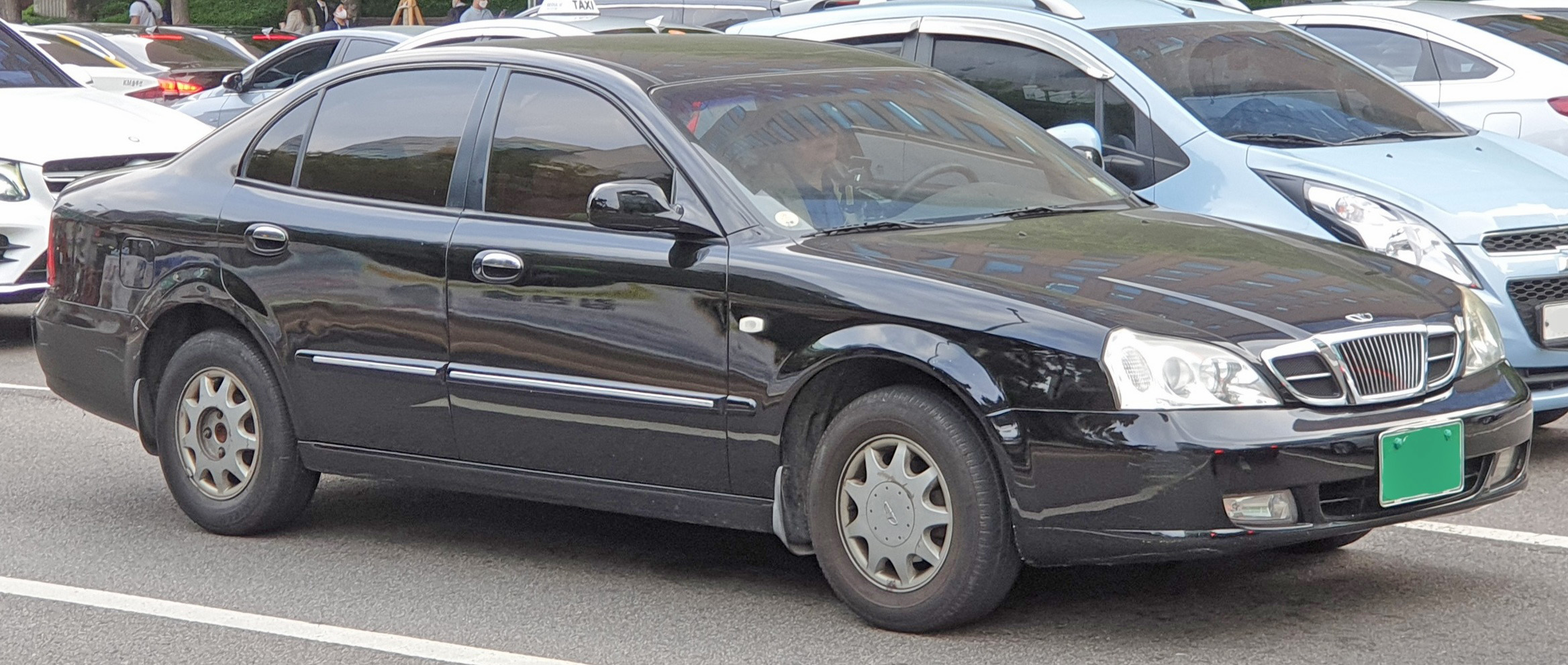
- Daewoo Magnus (pre-facelift, South Korea)

Overview
- Manufacturer: Daewoo (General Motors)
- Also called: Chevrolet Epica; Chevrolet Evanda; Daewoo Evanda; Formosa Magnus; Suzuki Verona
- Production: 2000–2006; 2005–2006 (China); 2002–2006 (Vietnam)
- Assembly: South Korea: Bupyeong; China: Yantai, Shandong; Taiwan: Taipei; Vietnam: Hanoi (GM Vietnam)
- Designer: Giorgetto Giugiaro at Italdesign

Body and chassis
- Class: Mid-size car (D)
- Body style: 4-door sedan
- Layout: Front-engine, front-wheel-drive

Powertrain
- Engine: 2.0 L L34 SOHC/DOHC I4 (gasoline); 2.0/2.5 L XK6 I6 (gasoline)
- Transmission: 5-speed manual 4-speed automatic

Dimensions
- Wheelbase: 106.3 in (2,700 mm)
- Length: 187.8 in (4,770 mm)
- Width: 71.5 in (1,816 mm)
- Height: Epica: 56.7 in (1,440 mm); Verona: 57.1 in (1,450 mm)

Chronology
- Predecessor: Daewoo Leganza; Chevrolet Alero (Europe); Daewoo Arcadia
- Successor: Chevrolet Epica (Europe); Daewoo Tosca; Suzuki Kizashi (for Suzuki Verona)

The Daewoo Magnus is a mid-sized sedan developed and manufactured by Daewoo for model years 2000–2006 under a single generation, and marketed globally by GM Daewoo and other General Motors divisions, as well as GMDAT stake holder Suzuki. Developed under its internal Daewoo designation V200, the Magnus was marketed prominently in the United States as the Suzuki Verona.

The V200 is a successor to the Daewoo Leganza (model V100), used a larger chassis of its platform. Launched in 23 November, it was sold alongside the Leganza in Korea until the end of V100's production in 2002, when it also superseded it in export markets. The V200 itself was given an extensive facelift for 2006, which resulted in the model known as V250, or Daewoo Tosca in Korea. The V250 completely superseded all versions of the V200 during 2006.

The Evanda comes equipped with the Daewoo-developed XK6 inline-6 engine (DOHC 24V, 155 hp (116 kW) at 5800 rpm, 177 lb⋅ft (240 N⋅m) of torque at 4000 rpm – Canadian specification) or a Holden-built 2.0 L D-TEC inline-4 (DOHC 16V) carried over from the Leganza. Italdesign of Italy was responsible for the styling and design of both the Leganza and Magnus. However, the upcoming V250 was styled in Korea by GM Daewoo.

Chery Automobile may have used the platform of this car on Chery Eastar, Chery A5 and Chery Tiggo 3.

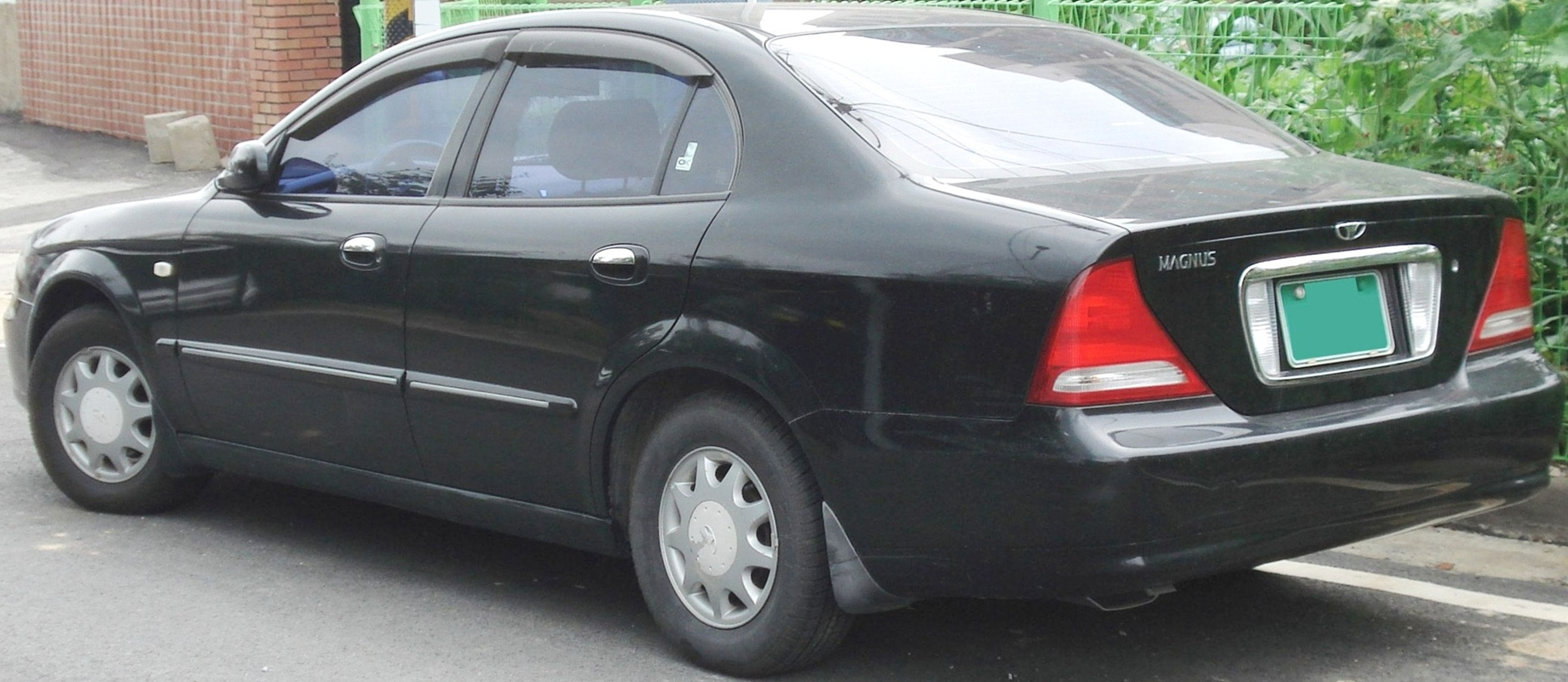
Daewoo Magnus (pre-facelift, South Korea)

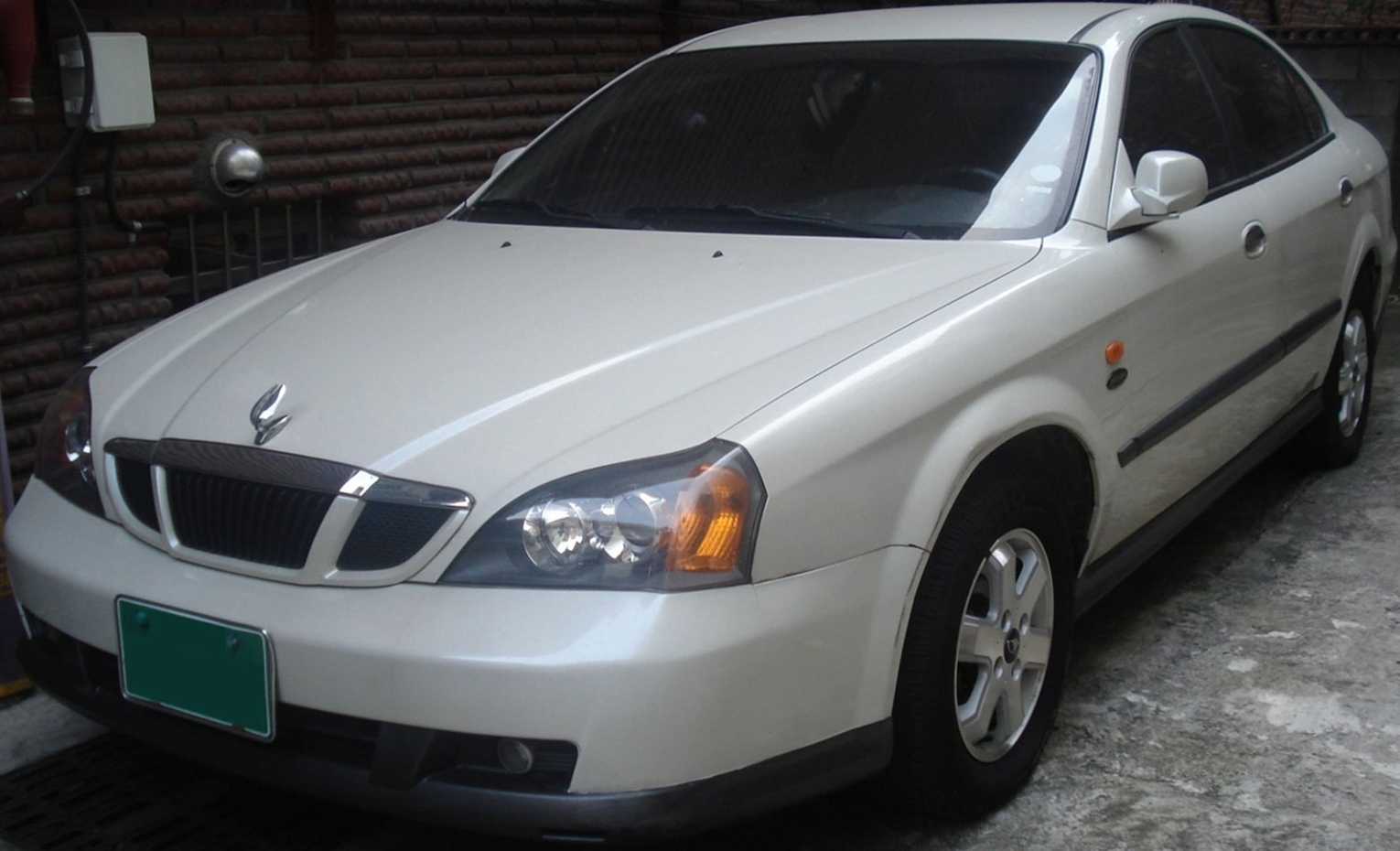
Daewoo Magnus (facelift, South Korea)

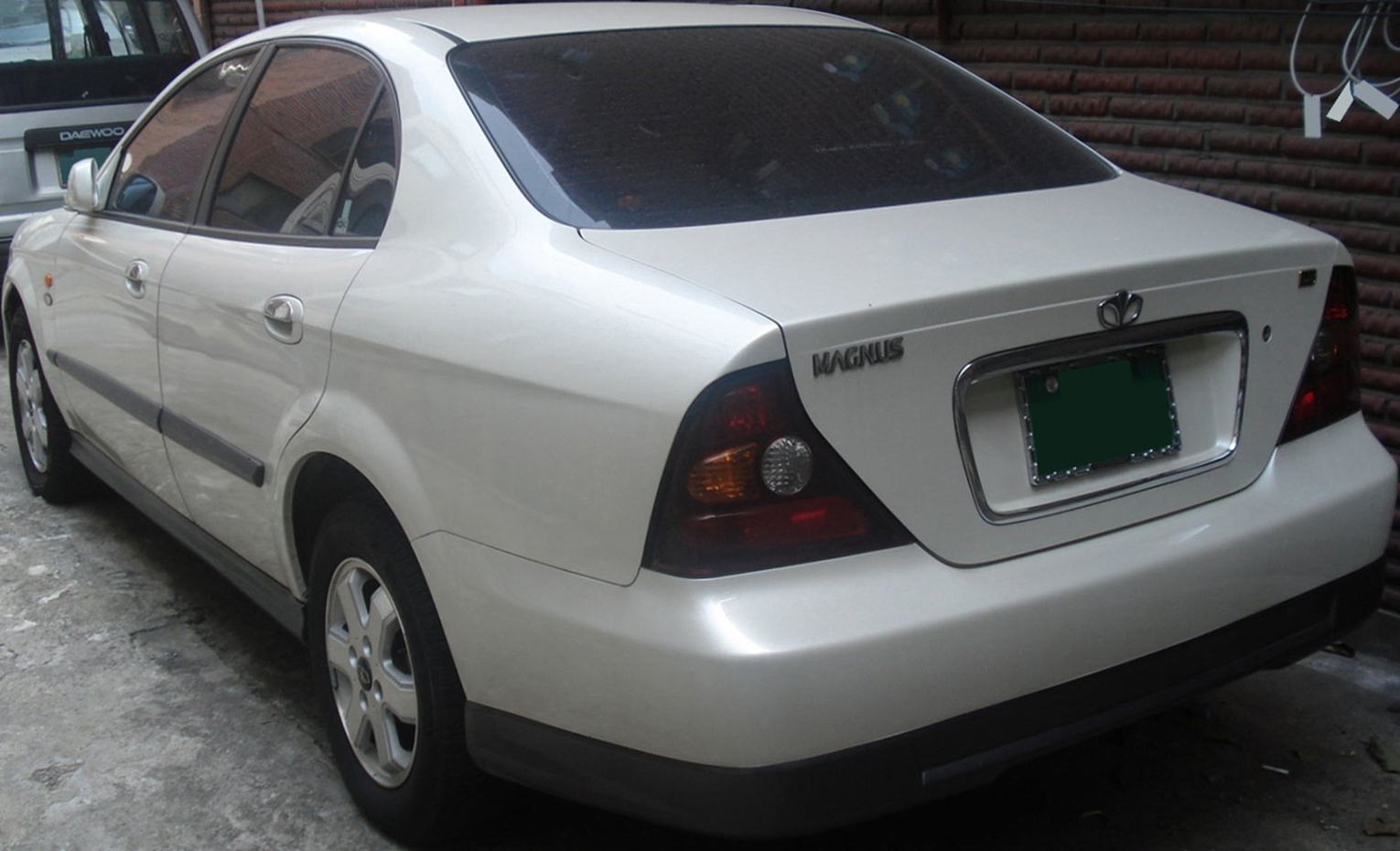
Daewoo Magnus (facelift, rear view)

== V200 in export markets ==
=== Daewoo / Chevrolet Evanda ===
From 2000 until 2004, the V200 was marketed as Daewoo Evanda in Western Europe, and Chevrolet Evanda in many Eastern European countries where GM did not use the Daewoo brand, as locally manufactured versions of old Daewoo models were still sold under that marque. The Evanda replaced the Leganza, and also the Chevrolet Alero. Later, in 2004, the entire Daewoo brand was replaced by Chevrolet in all of Europe, with models renamed accordingly.

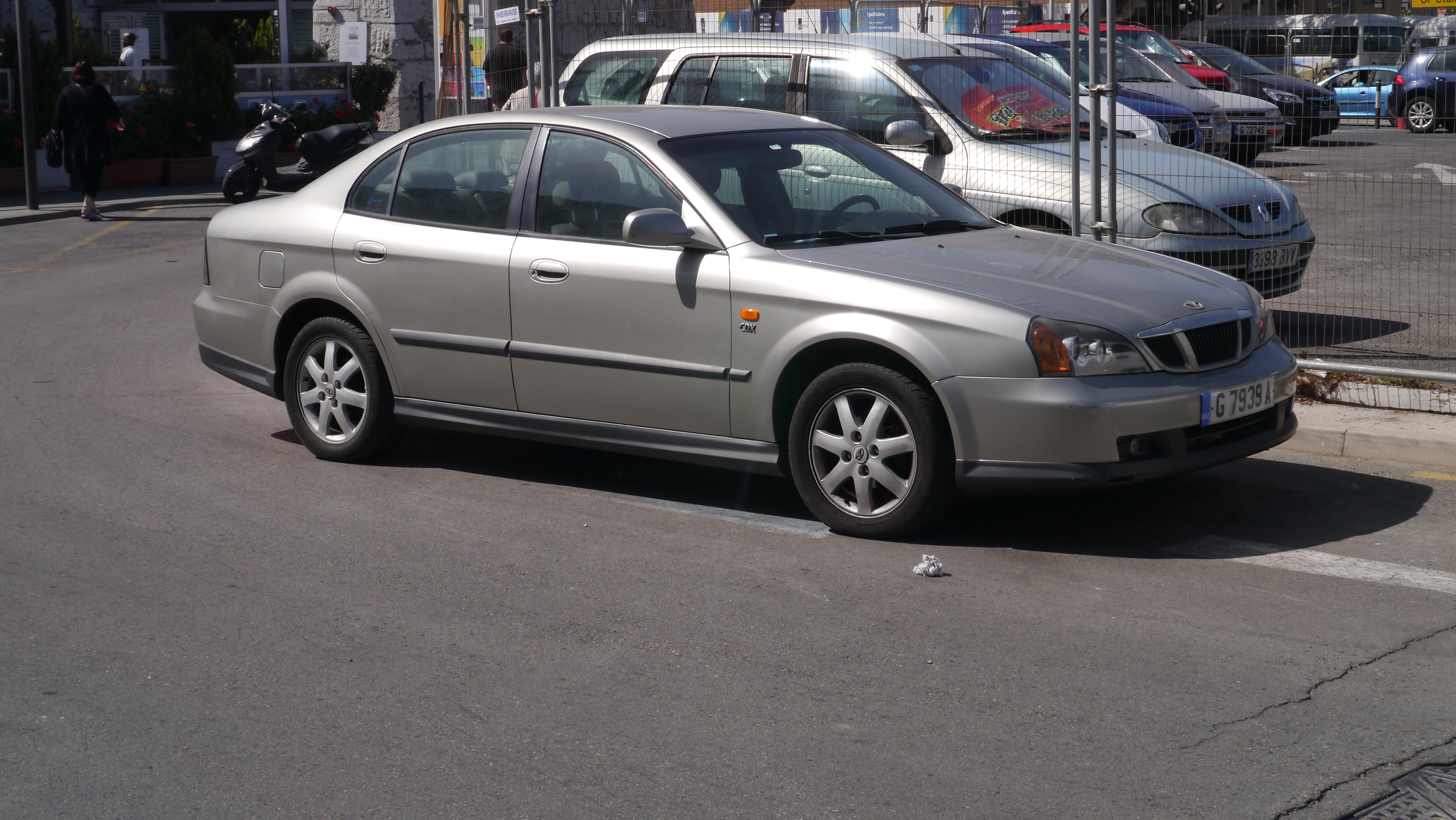
Daewoo Evanda (Gibraltar)

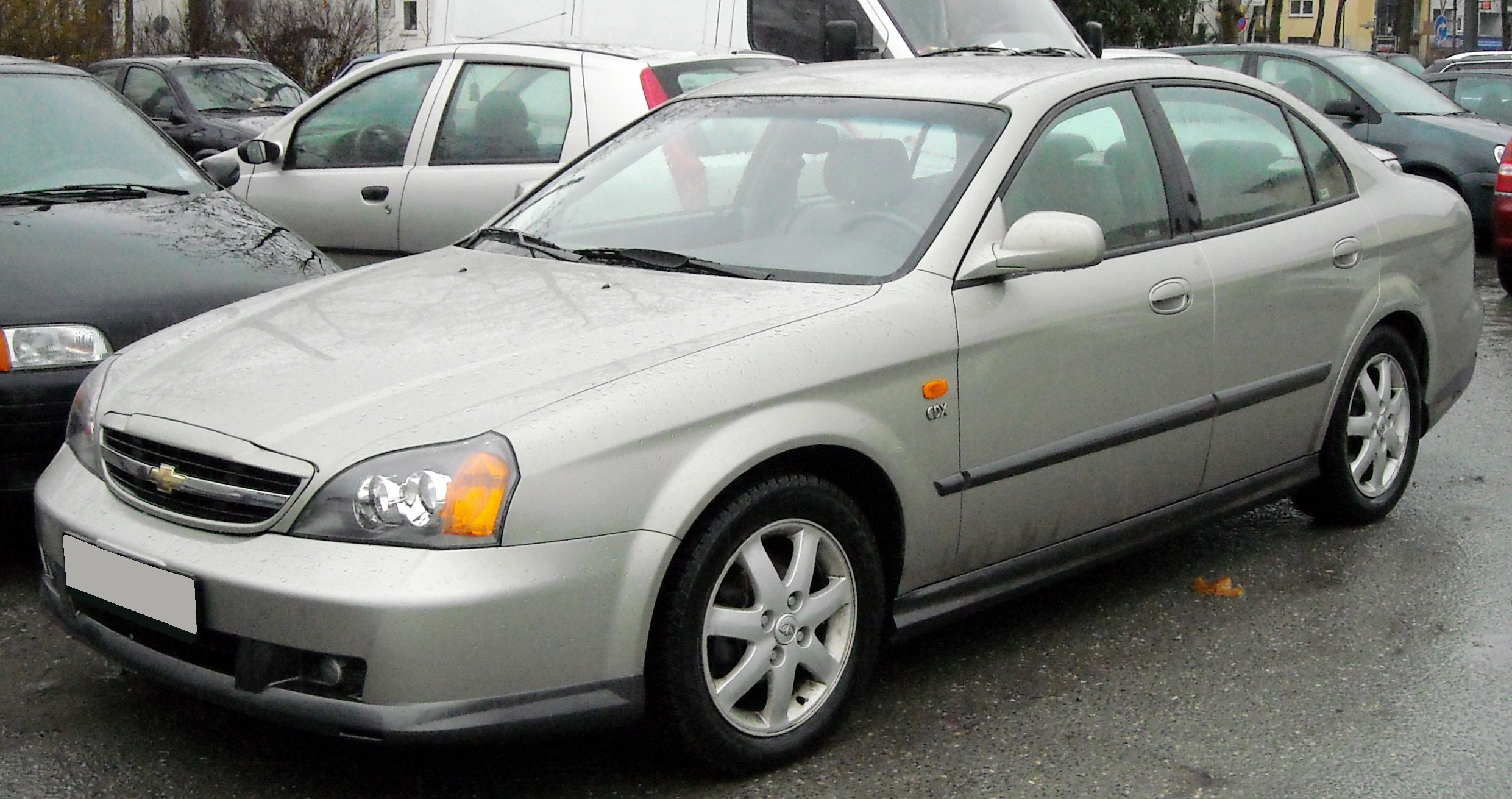
Chevrolet Evanda (front view)

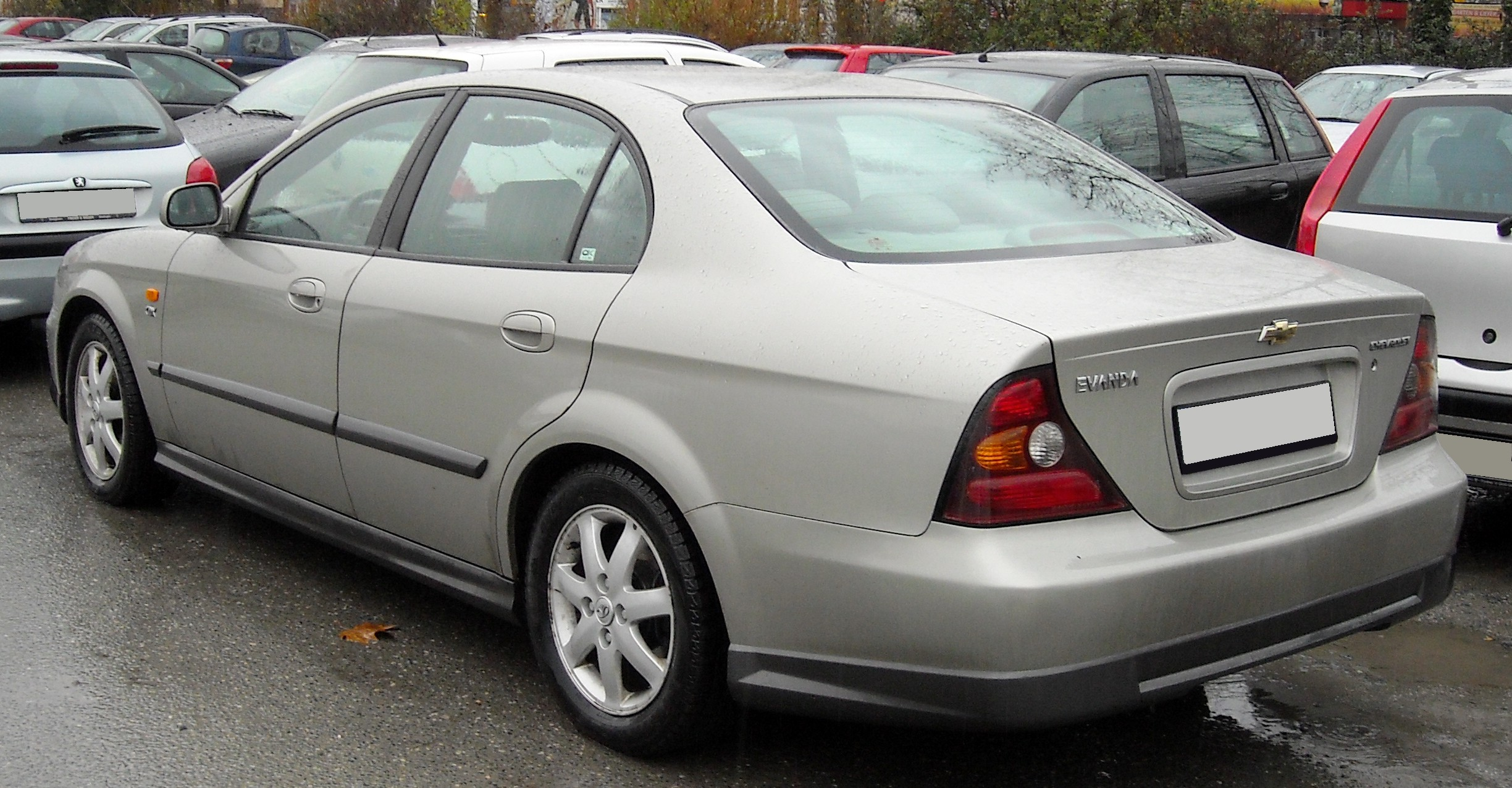
Chevrolet Evanda (rear view)

=== Chevrolet Epica ===
==== Canada ====
Since 2004 (during which it sold alongside the Suzuki Verona), the Chevrolet Epica was sold in Canada in two trim levels, the LS and LT. It replaced the Oldsmobile Alero since the marque's phaseout in 2004, as most Chevrolet dealerships sold Oldsmobiles. For model year 2005, both versions featured the 2.5 liter inline-6, driving the front wheels through an electronically controlled four speed automatic transmission. The car was positioned as an economical luxury entry, with the LS model equipped with 8 way power seat, 15 inch alloy wheels, 4 wheel disc brakes, air conditioning, cruise control, and CD player. The LT version added traction control, ABS, and sunroof, all also optional for the LS model. Base price was $24,710 (Canadian dollars) for the LS and $27,400 (Canadian dollars) for the LT. In price, it was Chevrolet's top-of-the-line sedan in Canada, priced between the Malibu and Impala, but slotted in size between the Cobalt and Malibu. Sales of the Epica were slow in Canada, with the Impala and Malibu outselling those two models.

The Chevrolet Epica is no longer sold in Canada as of September 2006. For the last year, a single version was sold: the LTZ at $26650. This unique trim level being fully loaded, only options were the side airbags and the Pearl White color. Some colors are unique to 2006: silver and charcoal grey.

==== United States Insular Areas ====
For a brief time the Chevrolet Epica was also available in the United States territories of Guam and Northern Mariana Islands, and like the Canadian version it also carried the same features. Like the Epica in Canada, it was withdrawn from the market too.

==== Other markets ====
The Daewoo Magnus was sold as Chevrolet Epica in other international markets too, such as Chile and China. The Chevrolet Epica sold in the Middle East (GCC) was then replaced by Chevrolet Malibu, sourced from South Korea (2012–2022).

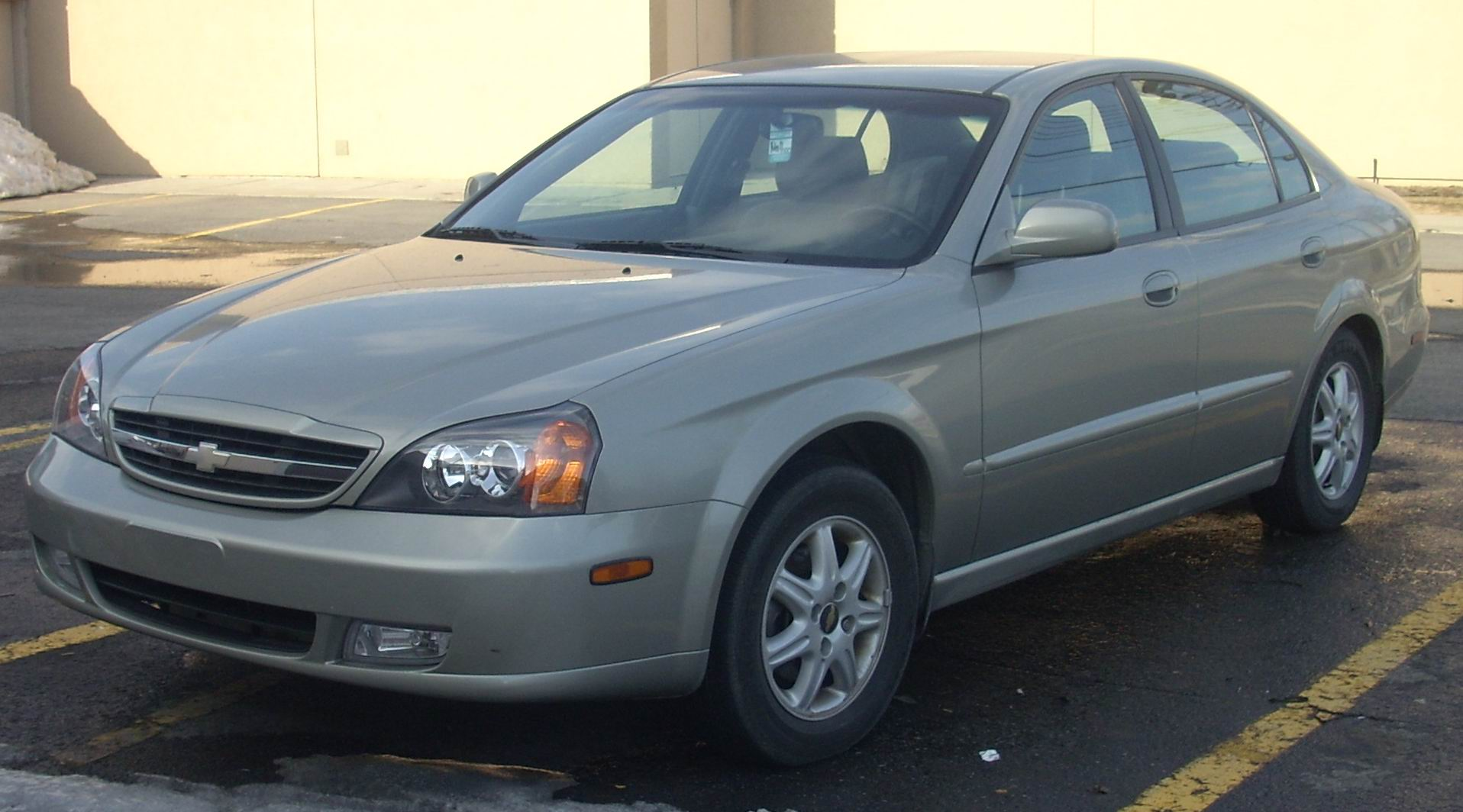
Chevrolet Epica (Canada)

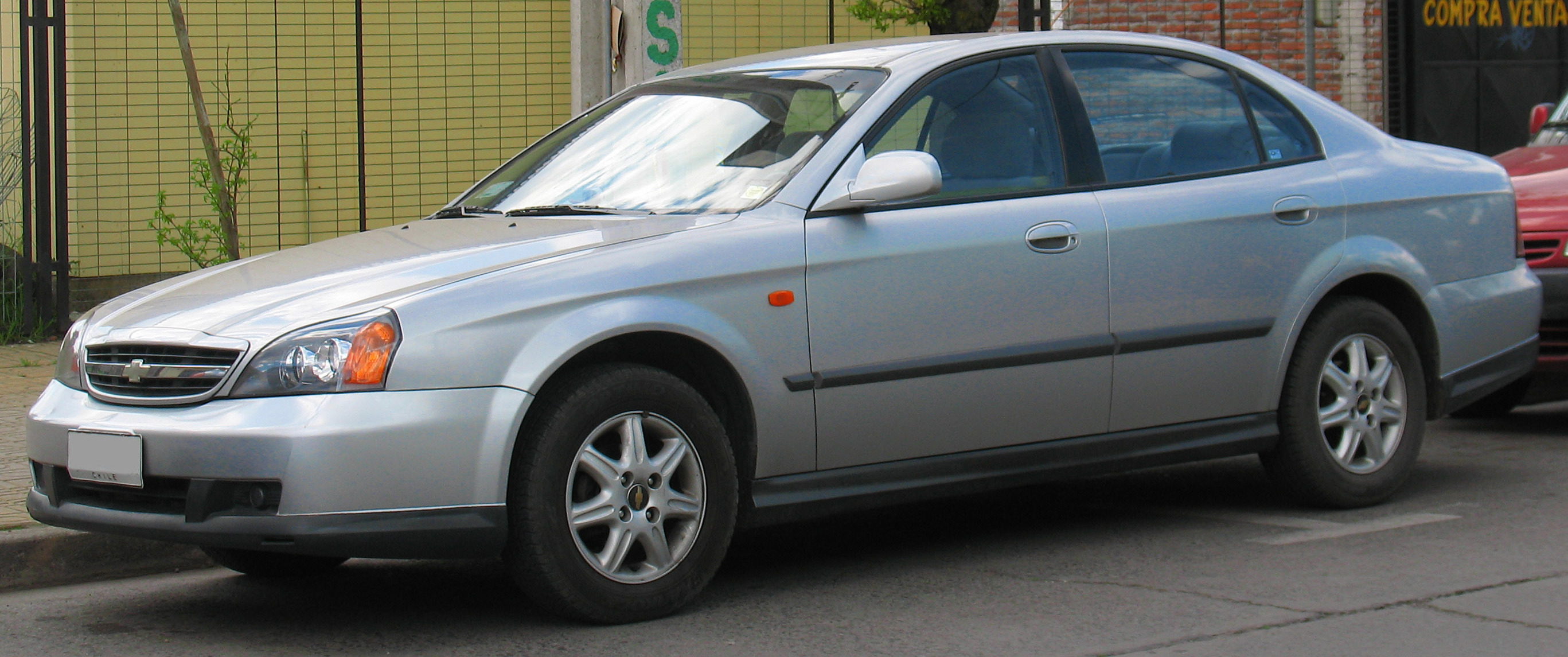
Chevrolet Epica (Chile)

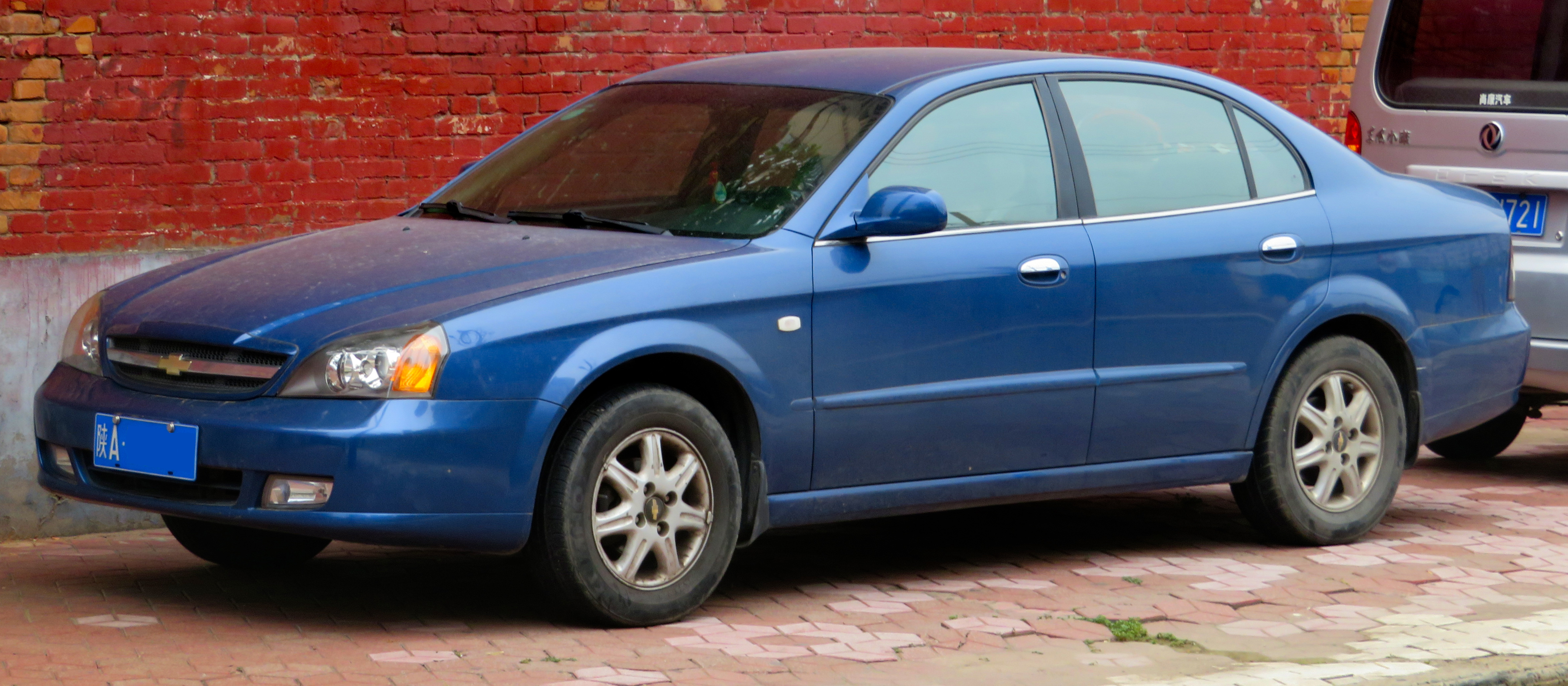
Chevrolet Epica (China)

The Chevrolet Epica nameplate is now being utilized globally for the Daewoo Tosca, the successor to the V200 Daewoo Magnus.

=== Suzuki Verona ===
The Magnus was also rebadged as the Suzuki Verona in the United States and Chevrolet Epica in other markets, including Canada, China, Chile, and Arabia. However, Suzuki announced it would drop the Verona after the 2006 model year due to low sales. This was likely caused by the fact that the US model only offered a small 2.5 6-cylinder engine and an automatic transmission as compared to other midsize cars offering larger engines and manual transmissions. The Verona was succeeded by the Suzuki Kizashi in 2010.

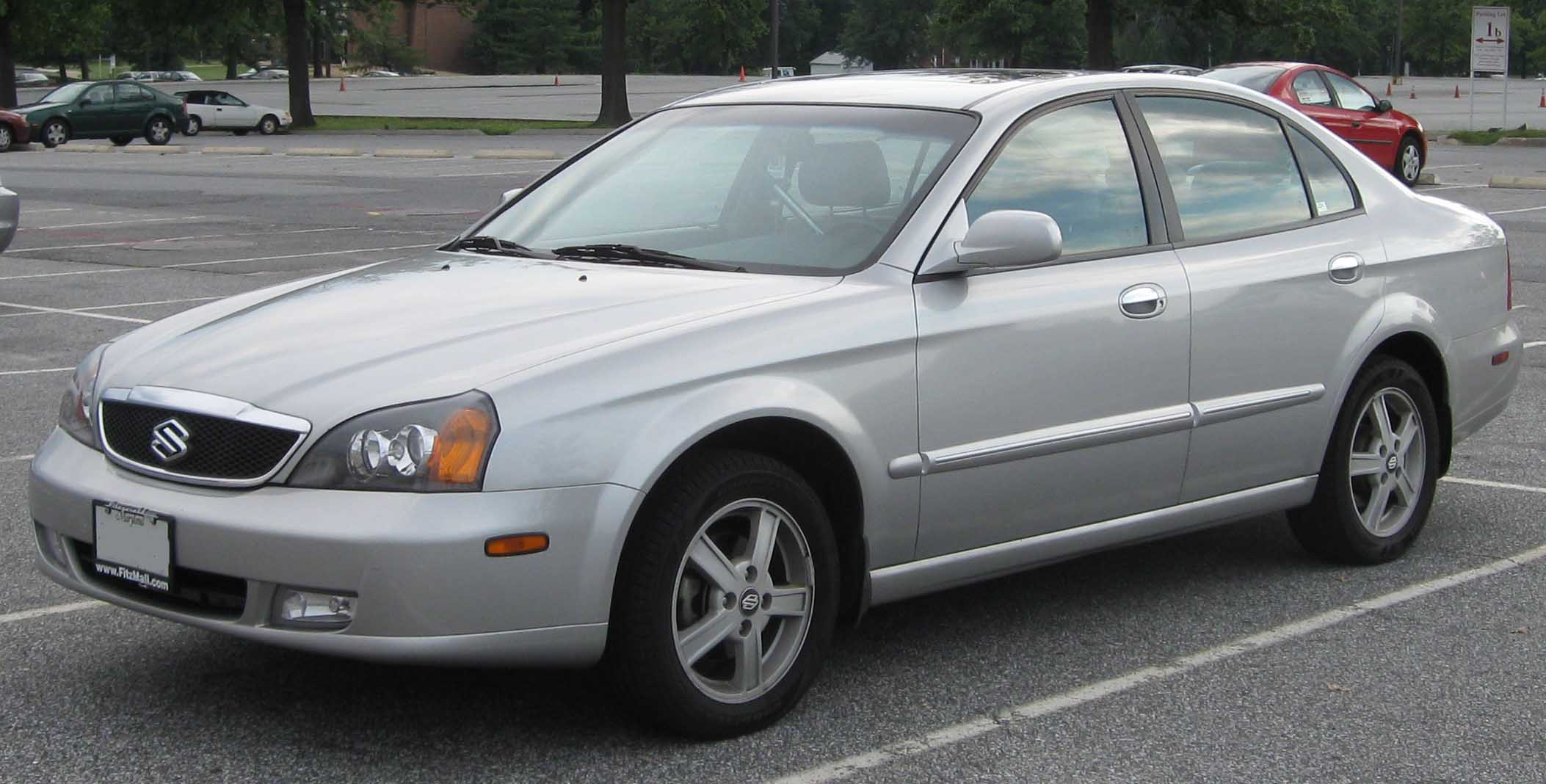
Suzuki Verona (front view)

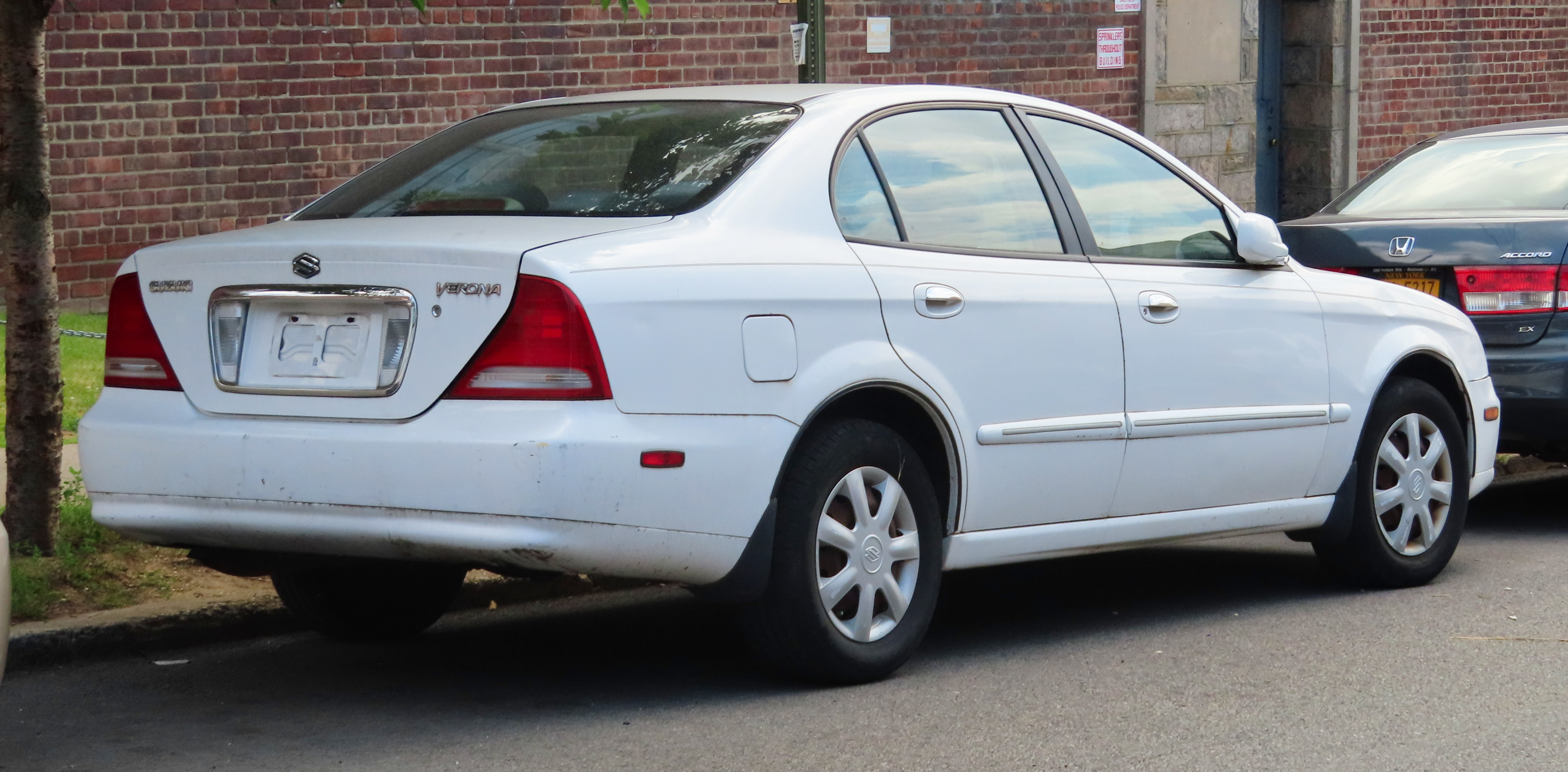
Suzuki Verona (rear view)

=== Formosa Magnus ===
The Daewoo Magnus is also known as the Formosa Magnus in Taiwan.

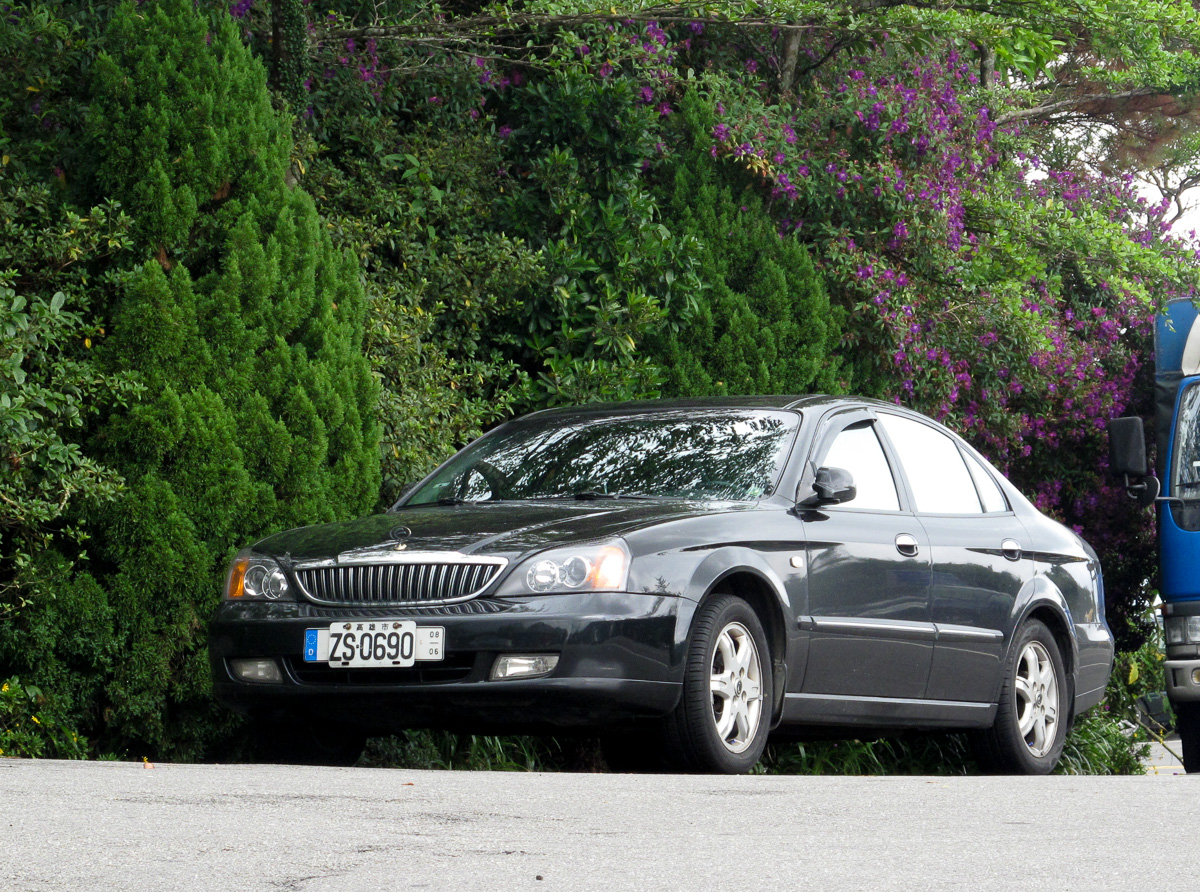
Formosa Magnus (Taiwan)

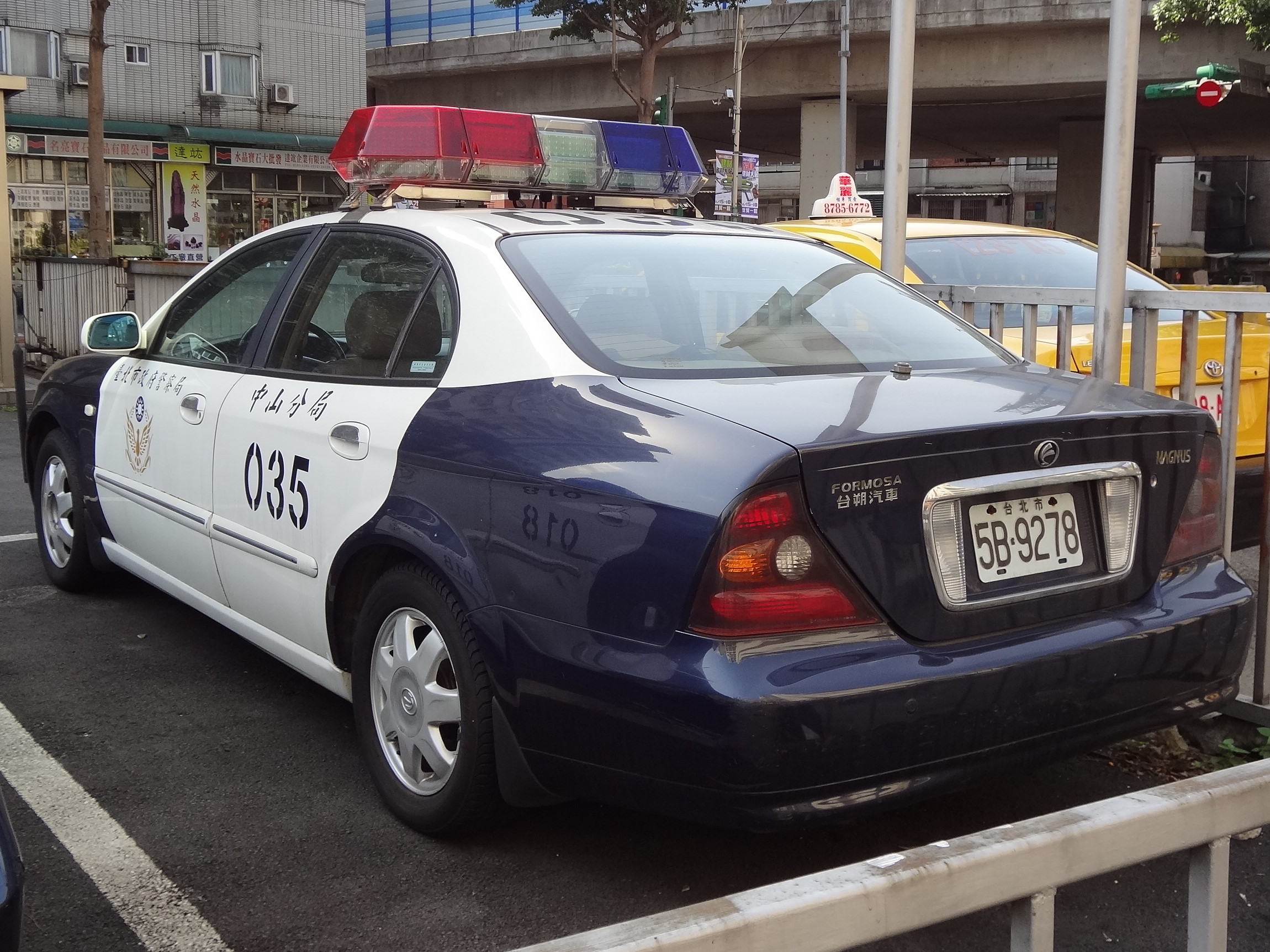
Formosa Magnus (rear view)
