= Aisin AF33 transmission =

Automatic transmission made by Toyota subsidiary Aisin

The Aisin AW AF33 is a 5-speed automatic transaxle developed and manufactured in Anjo, Japan by Aisin AW, a division of Aisin. It is designed to be used in transverse engine configurations in both FWD and AWD configurations.

The actual model codes are AW55-50SN and AW55-51SN. Manufactures have sometimes chosen own designations such as AF23, AF33 or AF33-5 (GM), RE5F22A (Nissan and Infiniti) or SU1 (Renault). Other manufacturers use the original designation(s) or minor variations of it such as AW55-50 LE (Volvo), AW 55-51 LE (Opel)FA57 (Saab), and U150E/U151F/U250E (Toyota).

== Maintenance ==
Several manufacturers list the transmission in their owners manuals as fill for life, meaning that there are no scheduled transmission fluid changes under normal operating conditions.

Transmission experts recommend regular fluid changes for severe driving condition, every 80,000 km (50,000 mi). Specific fluid must be used. If incorrect fluid is used it could result in improper operation and lead to transmission damage.

Aisin recommends to follow the scheduled maintenance. A badly done oil change can destroy the transmission.

=== Reliability ===
Some AF33 transmissions – specifically the variants used in Volvo vehicles – were very unreliable, with failures occurring within 80,000 km (50,000 mi) on some vehicles. Volvo eventually released an upgrade package to address the issue.

== Fluid ==
Fluid must meet the JWS 3309 specification. The fluid can be found under varying designations.

GM Saturn: Aisin AF23/33-5 type T-IV P/N 88900925 (in Canada, P/N 22689186). Volvo AW55-50/51SN P/N 1161540-8. Nissan RE5F22A Nissan Matic "K" Fluid capacity 8.2 qt. (7.8L) Synthetic.

Exxon/Mobil manufactures a specific synthetic mineral fluid for this transmission simply called "3309".

== Applications ==
Ford Motor Company

Ford
- 2008–2012 Ford Kuga 2.5T AWD

General Motors

Chevrolet

- 2004–2009 Chevrolet Equinox (Note: 3.4L engine only) (GM code M09 (FWD), M45 (AWD))
- 2006–2010 Chevrolet Captiva (Note: V6 3.2, 2.0 vcdi)
- 2006-2007 Chevrolet Epica (Note: L6 2.0L, L6 2.5L petrol, 2.0 vcdi)

Opel / Vauxhall

- 2002–2004 Opel Vectra C (Note: select engines only)
- 2002–2004 Opel Signum (Note: select engines only)
- 2006–2015 Opel Antara

Pontiac

- 2006–2009 Pontiac Torrent (Note: 3.4L engine only)

Saab

- 2003–2007 Saab 9-3
- 2002–2009 Saab 9-5

Saturn

- 2002–2003 Saturn Vue (Note: V6 only)
- 2003–2004 Saturn Ion (Note: Sedan only) (GM code M43)

Lancia

- 2002–2008 Lancia Thesis

Nissan

- 2004–2006 Nissan Maxima (code RE5F22A)
- 2004–2006 Nissan Quest
- 2004–2006 Nissan Altima

Renault

- 2001–2007 Renault Laguna (Note: V6 and 2.2dci) (code SU1)
- 2003–2015 Renault Espace
- 2002–2009 Renault Vel Satis

Suzuki

- 2007–2008 Suzuki XL7

Volvo

- 2000 Volvo S70 (Note: Non turbo petrol only) (FWD)
- 2000 Volvo V70 (Note: Non turbo petrol and R AWD model only) (FWD & AWD)
- 2000–2004 Volvo C70 (FWD)
- 2000–2004 Volvo S40 (FWD)
- 2000–2004 Volvo V40 (FWD)
- 2000–2009 Volvo S60 (FWD & AWD)
- 2000–2005 Volvo V70 II (FWD & AWD)
- 2003–2007 Volvo XC70 (AWD)
- 2000–2006 Volvo S80 (FWD & AWD)
- 2003–2006 Volvo XC90 (FWD & AWD)
- 2004–2013 Volvo S40 II (FWD & AWD)
- 2004–2013 Volvo V50 (FWD & AWD)
- 2006–2013 Volvo C30 (FWD)
- 2006–2013 Volvo C70 II (FWD)

== See also ==
- List of Aisin transmissions
