= GM 6T transmission =

6T 30 · 6T 35 6T 40 · 6T 45 · 6T 50

Overview
- Manufacturer: General Motors
- Production: 2008–present

Body and chassis
- Class: 6-speed transverse automatic transmission

Chronology
- Predecessor: 4T40-E/4T45-E

The Hydra-Matic 6T40 and similar 6T30, 6T45, and 6T50 are transversely-mounted six speed automatic transmissions produced by General Motors. The 6T40, referred to in GM inner circles as the GF6, made its debut in the 2008 Chevrolet Malibu, available with the 2.4 L LE5 Ecotec engine making 164 horsepower (122 kW), and has since also been made available on the Chevrolet Cruze, Daewoo Tosca and Buick LaCrosse. It features clutch-to-clutch shifting, eliminating the bands used on older transmission designs. GM chose an "on-axis" design as opposed to folding the gearset behind the engine and transferring power through the use of a chain, as is used in most other GM front wheel drive transaxles.

The 6T45 differs from the 6T40 in its use of heavier-duty components, allowing it to handle engines with greater torque. The 6T40 and 6T50 are available in front-wheel drive configuration only (MH8 and MUK), with the 6T40 also being paired with eAssist (MHH), but the 6T45 will be adaptable to both front-wheel drive (MH7) and all-wheel drive (MHC). The 6T50 is available in front-wheel or all wheel drive as well. The transmission is based on the larger 6T70/75, and is produced at Toledo, Ohio, as well as in China. Since 2008, these transmissions have been produced by GM Daewoo at the Boryeong Transmission Plant in Boryeong, South Korea. The facility is currently capable of producing up to 300,000 Hydra-Matic six-speed automatic transmissions annually. The transmission is also produced in Yantai, China.

6T30 is a recent more compact and lightweight variant used on 1.8 L engine equipped variants of the North American Chevrolet Cruze and Chevrolet Sonic. The 6T40 was still used in those models equipped with the 1.4 L turbocharged engine. GM lists the weight of the 6T30 with fluids at 71.5 kg (158 lb), while the 6T40/45/50 weigh between 82 kg (181 lb) and 90 kg (198 lb). GM launched the 6T35 250 nm, a higher torque variant of the 6T30, with the 2016 Cruze and its new 1.4 L turbocharged engine, saving space and approximately 24 lbs over the 6T40 used in the prior turbocharged Cruze.

== Gear ratios ==
Gear Model	R	1	2	3	4	5	6	Final Drive
6T 30 6T 35	–2.871	4.449	2.908	1.893	1.446	1.000	0.742	3.14 · 3.47
6T 40 6T 45	–2.940	4.584	2.964	1.912	1.446	1.000	0.746	2.64 · 2.89; 3.23 · 3.53; 3.87

== Applications ==
=== 6T30 ===
- 2008–2015 (2016 Limited) Chevrolet Cruze/Daewoo Lacetti Premiere/Holden Cruze (1.8l I4)
- 2012-2018 Chevrolet Sonic/Aveo (1.8l I4)

=== 6T35 ===
- 2011-2019 Chevrolet Cruze/Daewoo Lacetti Premiere/Holden Cruze (1.4T I4)
- 2012-2020 Chevrolet Sonic (1.4T I4)

=== 6T40 ===
- 2008–2016 Chevrolet Cruze/Daewoo Lacetti Premiere/Holden Cruze (1.4T I4)
- 2012-2020 Chevrolet Sonic/Aveo (1.4T I4)
- 2013-present Chevrolet Trax (1.4T I4 & 1.2T I3)
- 2014-2019 Chevrolet Impala (2.4L I4 eAssist/ 2.5L I4)
- 2008-2012 Chevrolet Malibu (2.4L I4)
- 2013-2016 Chevrolet Malibu (2.4l I4 eAssist/ 2.5L I4)
- 2013-2022 Buick Encore (1.4T I4)
- 2011-2017 Buick Verano (2.4L I4)
- 2011-2017 Buick Regal (2.4L I4, 2.4L I4 eAssist)
- 2011-2017 Buick Lacrosse (2.4L I4 eAssist)
- 2009 Saturn Aura (2.4L I4)
- 2009-2010 Pontiac G6 (2.4L I4)
- 2009-2018 Opel/Vauxhall Astra (1.6L I4)

=== 6T45 ===
- 2010-2017 Chevrolet Equinox (2.4L I4)
- 2010-2017 GMC Terrain (2.4L I4)
- 2008–2015 Chevrolet_Cruze (2.0L RA 420 SOHC I4)
- 2017-2019 Opel Insignia B1 (1.6 Cdti 136PS)
- 2017-2019 Opel Astra K Sport Tourer (1.6T 200PS)

=== 6T50 ===
- 2011 Buick Verano (2.0T I4)
- 2011 Chevrolet Captiva (3.0 SIDI V6)

== See also ==
- List of GM transmissions
- GM-Ford 6-speed automatic transmission
