= Formosa Automobile Corporation =

Taiwanese automotive company

- Company type: Private Company、Limited Liability
- Industry: Automotive Production
- Founded: 20 October 1996; 29 years ago
- Founder: Lee Tzung-Chang (李宗昌)
- Headquarters: Tunhwa Rd. North No. 201, Songshan District, Taipei, Taiwan 105
- Products: Automobile
- Number of employees: 300
- Website: www.daf.com.tw

Formosa Automobile Corporation (Chinese: 台朔汽車股份有限公司) is a Taiwanese automobile company. It was founded on October 20, 1996, by Mr. Lee Tzung-Chang of the Taiwanese Formosa Plastics Group.

Formosa Automobile Corporation started after buying a factory from Sanfu Motor Co. Ltd. Its initial plan was to produce LPG and petroleum vehicles and to increase production and management experiences in vehicle production.

On November 11, 1999, Formosa Automobile Corporation started a product license agreement with GM Daewoo to produce the Magnus sedan under the Formosa brand as their first product.

The Formosa Magnus was a re-branded Daewoo Magnus sedan running on the SC-1 DOHC 2.0L engine by GM. The Formosa Matiz hatchback was added later, based on the new-badge Daewoo Matiz. The development of electric vehicles was also planned.

In 2004, Formosa Automobile Corporation shut down the self-owned Formosa brand due to a long-term financial loss.

In 2005, Formosa Automobile Corporation acquired the procuration rights of the Czech Republic Skoda brand of VAG and introduced the Fabia, Octavia, Superb, and Roomster passenger cars. Due to the high prices of Skoda cars, Formosa Automobile Corporation abstained from the procuration rights of the Skoda brand in 2007, with the aftermarket maintenance transferred to the Formosa Automobile commercial subsidiary.

By the end of 2006, Formosa Automobile Corporation had only the production line of the DAF Trucks brand left with the Formosa Automobile commercial subsidiary in charge. Future plans include the export sales of Southeast Asian markets, and DAF Trucks Taiwan is only in charge of sales and service.

But after 2006, the company encountered obstacles such as market rivalry from other companies and evolving consumer tastes, impacting its business trajectory. These challenges led to ongoing fluctuations in financial performance and operational sustainability.

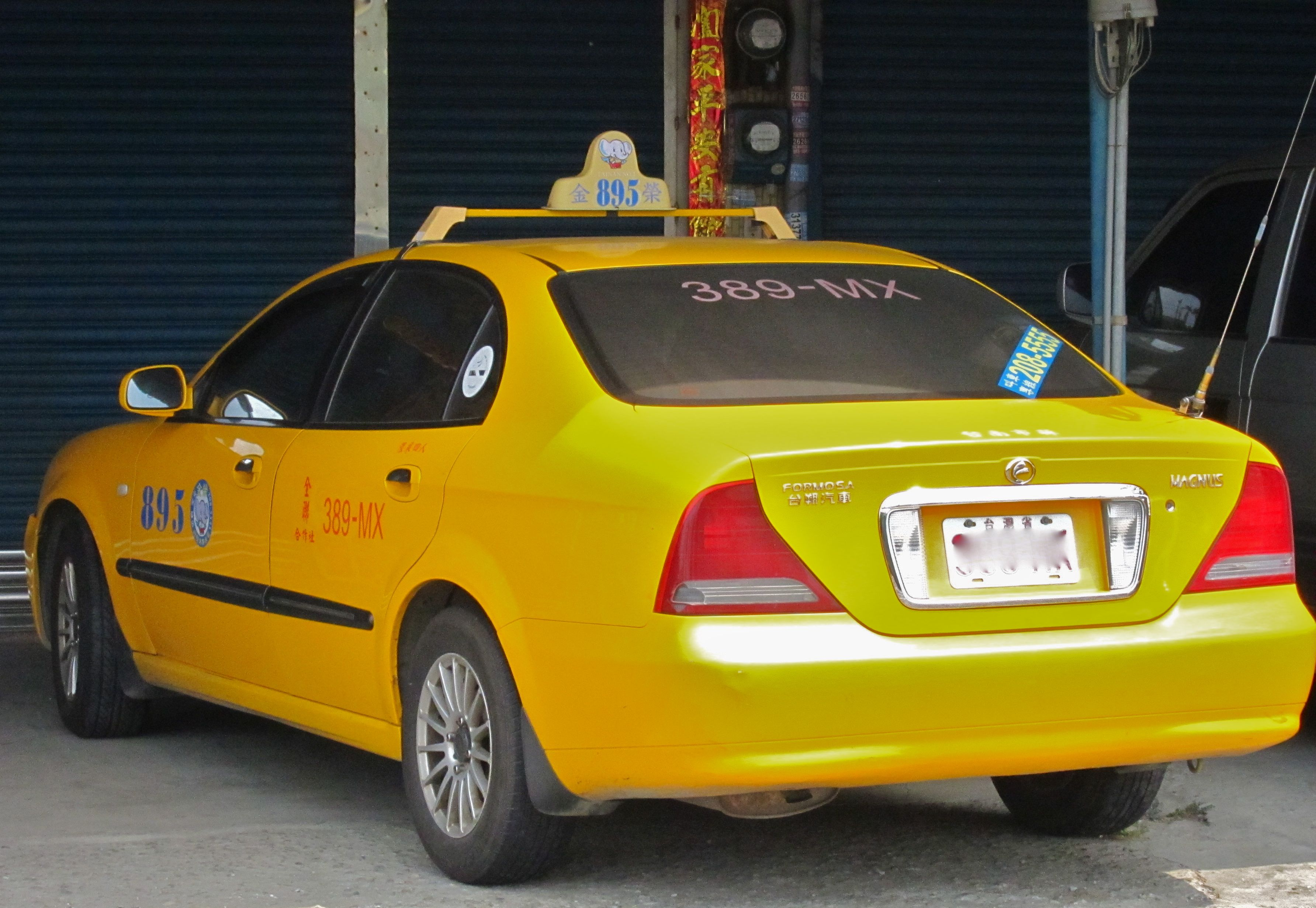
Formosa Magnus as taxi a in Taiwan.

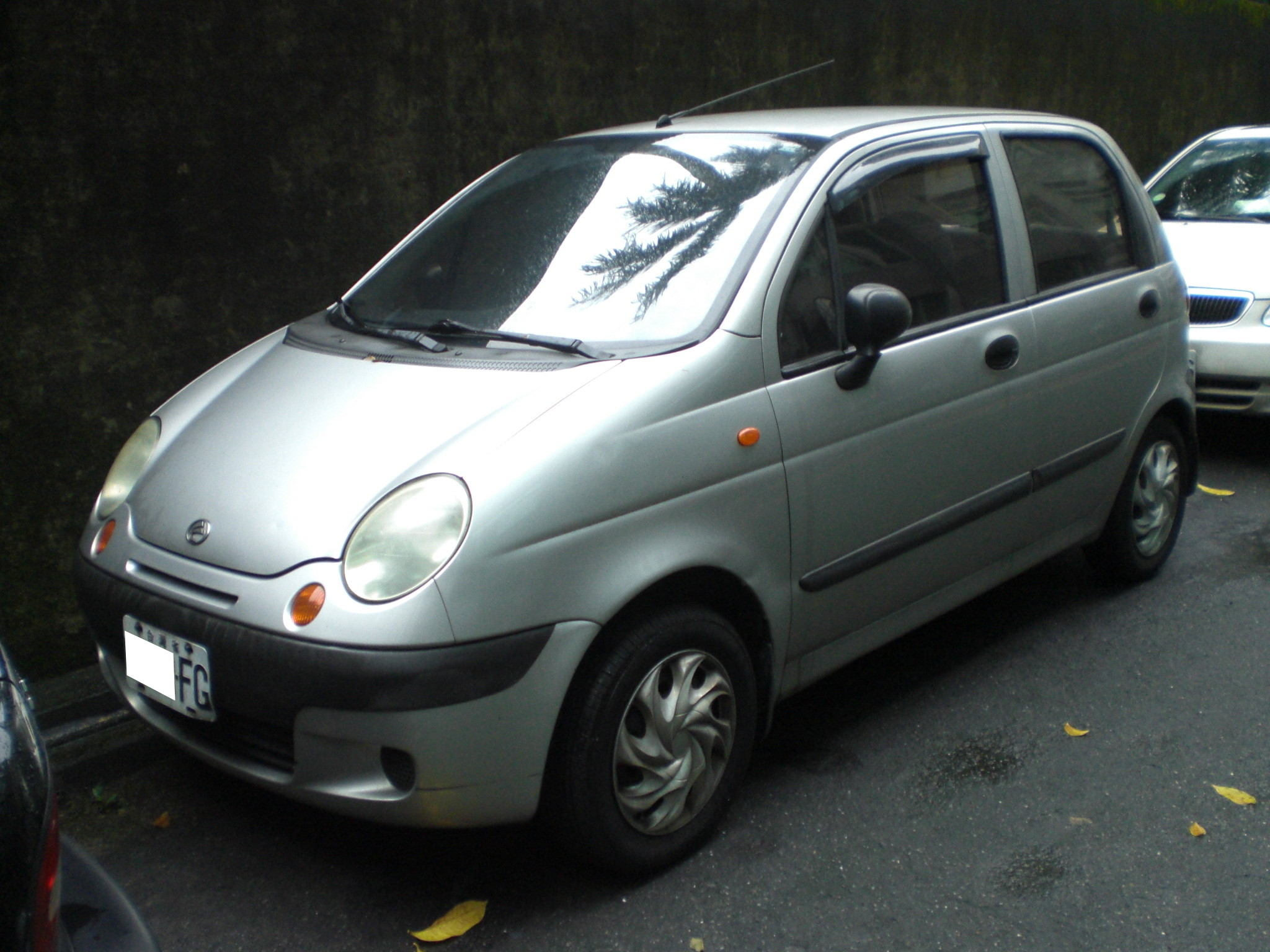
Formosa Matiz hatchback.

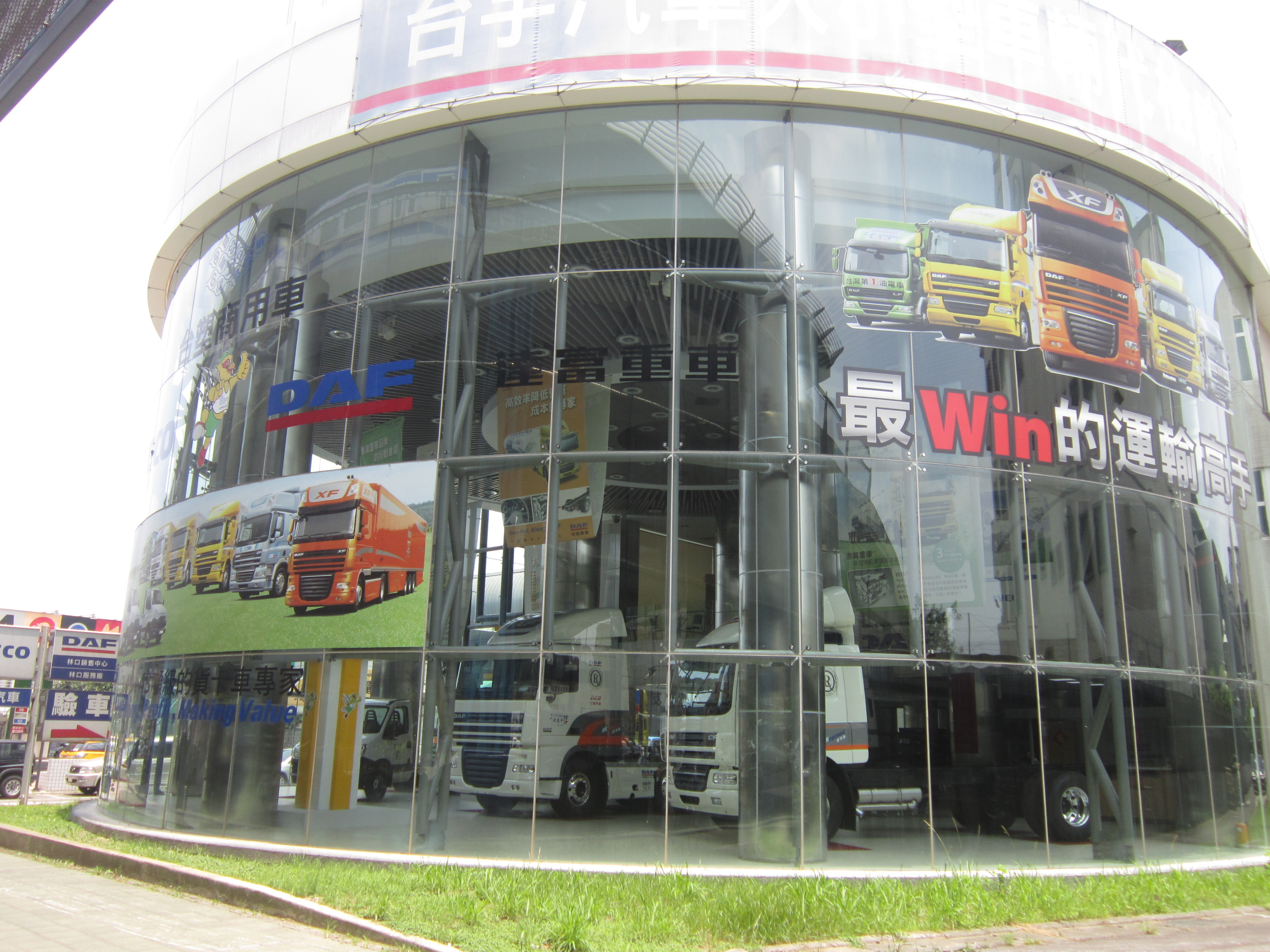
DAF Linkou Service Centre.

== See also ==
- Transportation in Taiwan
- List of Taiwanese automakers
- List of companies of Taiwan
- DAF
