= Buick Verano (North America) =

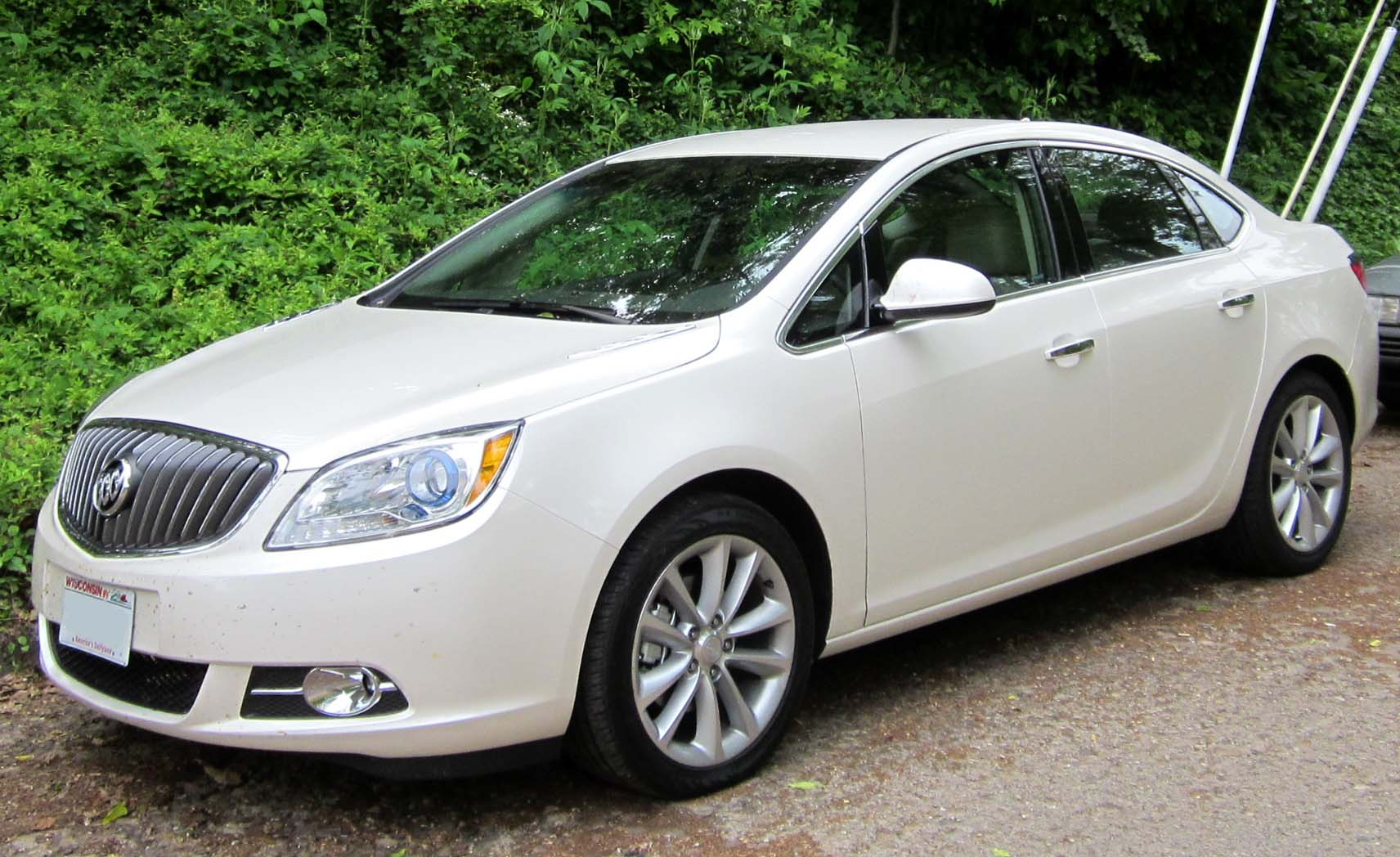

Overview
- Manufacturer: Buick
- Also called: Buick Excelle GT (China)
- Production: 2011–2017
- Model years: 2012–2017
- Assembly: Orion Township, Michigan (Orion Assembly)
- Designer: David Lyon

Body and chassis
- Class: Compact car
- Body style: 4-door sedan
- Layout: Front-engine, front-wheel drive
- Platform: Delta II platform
- Related: Buick Excelle XT; Chevrolet Cruze; Chevrolet Orlando; Opel Astra; Vauxhall Astra; Holden Astra

Powertrain
- Engine: 2.4 L LEA I4 (gasoline/E85); 2.0 L LHU I4 (turbocharged gasoline); 1.6 L A16LET (LLU) I4 (turbocharged gasoline); 1.5 L LFV I4 (turbocharged gasoline)
- Transmission: 6-speed GM 6T40 automatic; 6-speed GM 6T50 automatic; 6-speed GM F40-6 manual; 7-speed dual-clutch

Dimensions
- Wheelbase: 105.7 in (2,685 mm)
- Length: 183.9 in (4,671 mm)
- Width: 71.4 in (1,814 mm)
- Height: 58.4 in (1,483 mm)
- Curb weight: 3,300 lb (1,500 kg)

The Buick Verano is a compact car manufactured by General Motors' Buick brand from 2011 to 2016. It debuted at the North American International Auto Show on January 10, 2011, during a preview of Buick's then upcoming 2012 model. It is the first compact marketed by Buick in the United States since the 1998 Buick Skylark. Verano is Spanish for summer.

The Verano, the Buick Excelle GT, which was developed for the Chinese market, and the Opel Astra/Vauxhall Astra sedan share General Motors' Delta II platform with the Chevrolet Cruze, Chevrolet Orlando, and Opel/Vauxhall Zafira Tourer.

Jim Federico, Executive Director and Vehicle Chief Engineer for Verano, led the vehicle development team and David Lyon, Buick design director, styled the exterior.

== Description ==
The Verano is essentially a North American-market version of the Chinese-market compact Buick Excelle GT. The Verano's unibody construction uses galvanized steel for its front fenders, hood, roof and door panels and thermoplastic polyolefin (TPO) bumper covers. It incorporates acoustical laminated glass, triple door seals, a five-layer interior roof liner, sound absorbing mats, recycled denim insulation and specially manufactured 18-inch forged alloy wheels, which minimize road noise. Buick's VentiPorts reappeared at the Verano's introduction, a styling feature unique to Buick dating back to 1949.

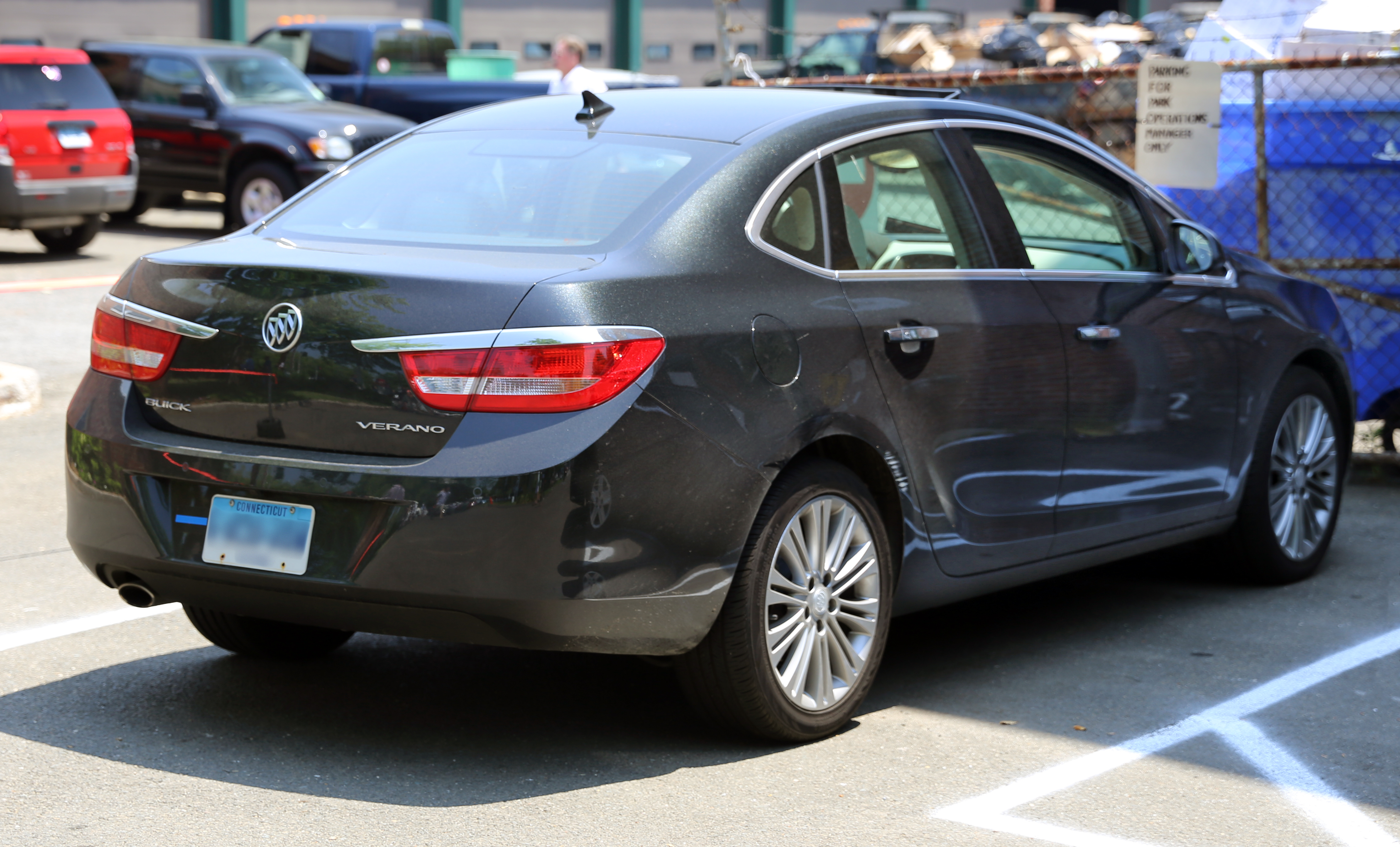
Rear view

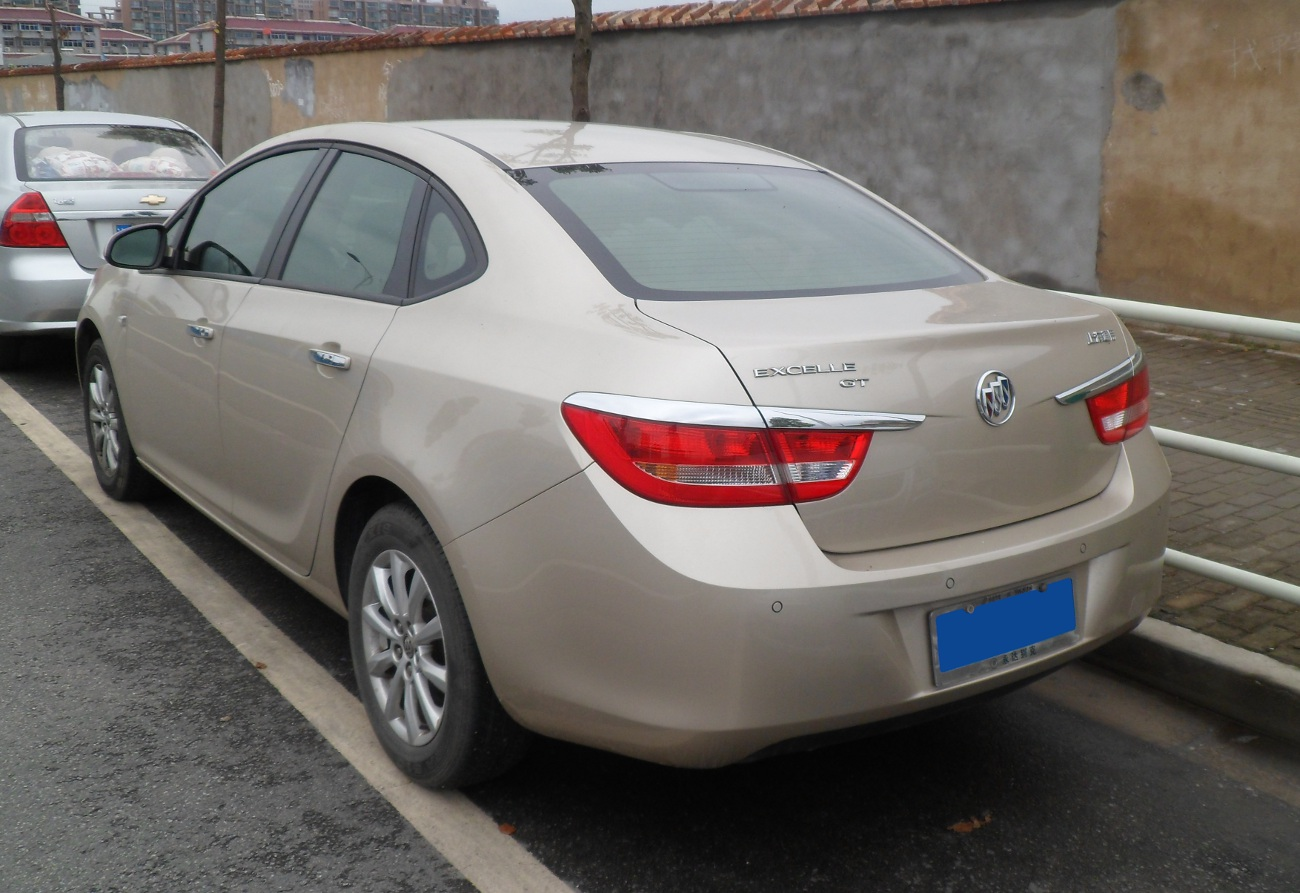
Buick Excelle GT (China)

The standard powertrain is a 2.4 L Ecotec direct-injected DOHC I4 mated to a six-speed automatic transmission. The 2.4 L engine is rated 180 horsepower (130 kW; 180 PS) at 6,700 rpm and 171 lb⋅ft (232 N⋅m; 24 kg⋅m) of torque at 4,900 rpm. The engine is flex-fuel capable, meaning it can use either gasoline, or E85 ethanol (2012–13) • 2.4L, or any combination of the two fuels. EPA fuel economy estimates are 21 mpg_{‑US} (11 L/100 km; 25 mpg_{‑imp}) city and 32 mpg_{‑US} (7.4 L/100 km; 38 mpg_{‑imp}) highway for gasoline. A 2012 on-road mixed highway-city review by the website MPGOMATIC showed an average 26.5 mpg_{‑US} (8.9 L/100 km; 31.8 mpg_{‑imp}) on E85, and 29 mpg_{‑US} (8.1 L/100 km; 35 mpg_{‑imp}) for gasoline.

A 2.0 L turbocharged version became available in late 2012, for the 2013 model year, as did a 6-speed manual transmission. The 2.0 L turbo engine is rated at 250 horsepower (186 kW; 253 PS) and 260 lb⋅ft (353 N⋅m; 36 kg⋅m) of torque. GM estimated acceleration from 0–60 mph (0–97 km/h) is 6.2 seconds, matching the number posted by the Buick Regal GS.

For 2016, the Verano added a new Sport Touring Edition which included unique 18″ aluminum black pocket wheels and a rear lip spoiler.

The Verano was phased out from the US market after the 2017 model year. The second generation Verano is sold exclusively in China, leaving Buick without an entry-level sedan in the US market.

=== Engines ===
Gasoline engine
Engine	Displacement	Power	Torque	Transmission	Model Years
2.4 L Ecotec I4 (Flex-Fuel)	2384 cc	180 hp (134 kW) at 6700 rpm	171 ft⋅lb (232 N⋅m) at 4900 rpm	6-speed automatic	2012-
2.0 L Ecotec t/c I4	1998 cc	250 hp (186 kW) at 5300 rpm	260 ft⋅lb (353 N⋅m) at 2000 rpm	6-speed automatic 6-speed manual (optional)	2013-
1.6 L Family 1 t/c I4	1598 cc	184 hp (137 kW) at 5800 rpm	173 ft⋅lb (235 N⋅m) at 2200 - 5600 rpm	6-speed automatic	2010-

*** 2015 Chinese sales include Excelle XT/GT, 2nd gen. Excelle GT and Verano figures.
