= San Luis Potosí Assembly =

General Motors assembly plant in Mexico

Coordinates: 21°59′22.54″N 100°52′28.77″W

San Luis Potosí Assembly is a General Motors assembly plant located in San Luis Potosí, Mexico — 400 km northwest of Mexico City. The facility was dedicated on July 30, 2008, with a June 2009 construction completion. President Vicente Fox, other dignitaries, and local executives from General Motors attended the ground-breaking ceremony in July 2006.

== Plant overview ==
Built on a 850-acre (3.4 km^{2}) site, the plant recycles 90% of the water it uses. The plant cost $650 million (US), employs up to 1800 and has an annual capacity of 160,000 cars is a part of a "quiet" trend of US companies moving production facilities to Mexico with little publicity. Other examples include the Dodge Journey now manufactured at the newly renovated Toluca Car Assembly, where Chrysler invested $1 billion. Nissan manufactures its Versa in a Mexican plant — after a $1.3 million investment from the automaker and its suppliers. Volkswagen produces Jettas for the global market at its plant in Puebla, and will start production of the Jetta station wagon.

The GM factory will be augmented by a new fastener production facility called Parque Industrial Millennium, a 3,400 square metres (37,000 sq ft) building, where EJOT of Bad Berleburg, Germany and ATF Inc. of Lincolnwood, IL, will manufacture engineered fasteners and cold-headed products.

== Production ==
San Luis Potosí Assembly currently manufacturers the Chevrolet Equinox and GMC Terrain crossover vehicles.

The plant previously manufactured rebadged variants of the Daewoo Kalos for the North American market. These included the Chevrolet Aveo and Pontiac G3/Wave for the United States and Canada, and the Suzuki Swift+ for Canada. The plant also manufactured Aveos marketed in Mexico and South America.

The plant also previously manufactured the Chevrolet Trax and the Chevrolet Onix subcompact car.

=== Current ===
- Chevrolet Equinox (2017–present)
- GMC Terrain (2017–present)

=== Former ===
- Chevrolet Onix (2019–2022)
- Pontiac G3/Wave (2009–2010)
- Suzuki Swift+ (2009–2010)
- Chevrolet Aveo (2009–2017)
- Chevrolet Trax (2012–2020)
