= Chevrolet Equinox =

Compact crossover SUV

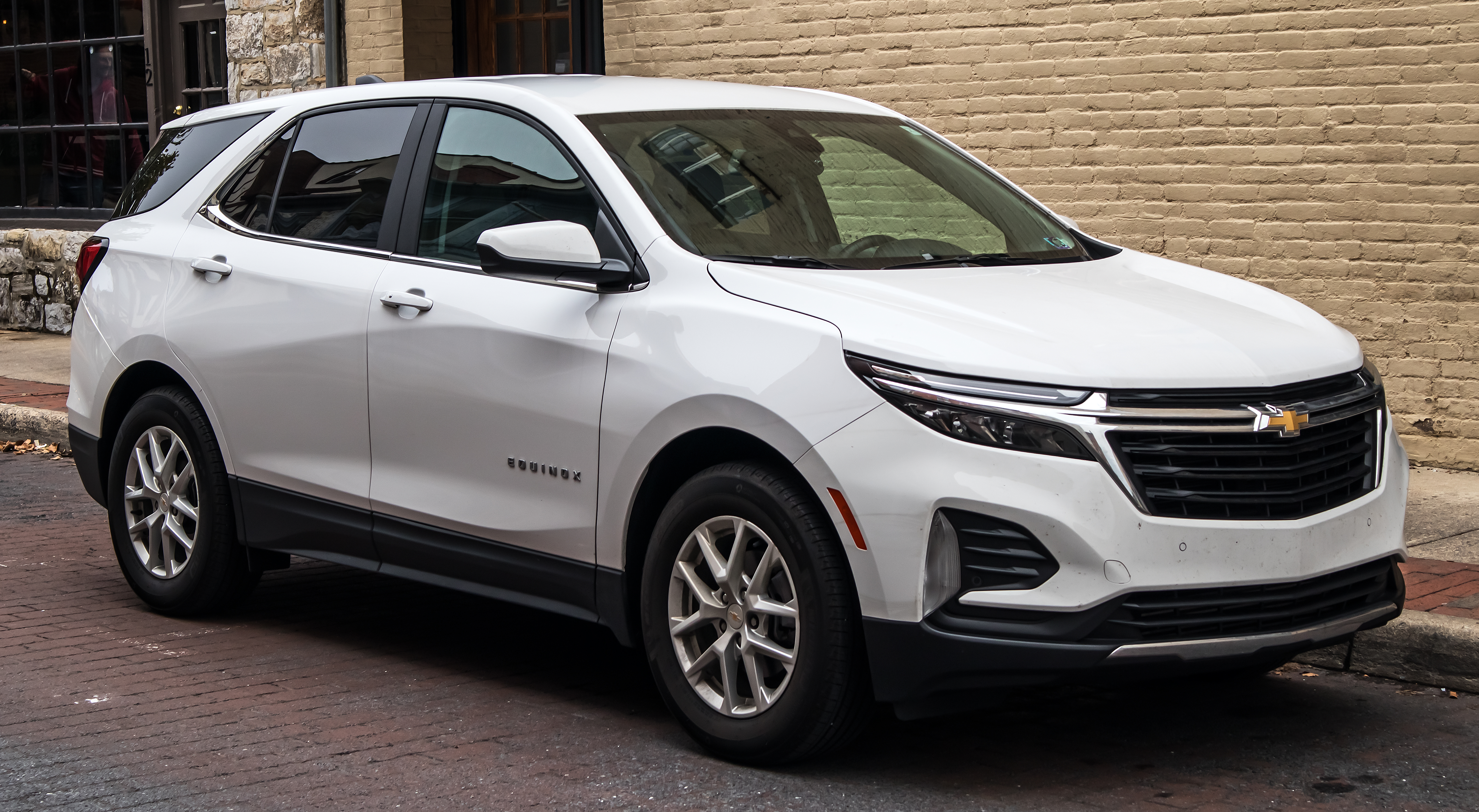

Overview
- Manufacturer: General Motors
- Also called: Pontiac Torrent (2005–2009); GMC Terrain (2010–present); Holden Equinox (2017–2020)
- Production: 2004–present
- Model years: 2005–present

Body and chassis
- Class: Mid-size crossover SUV (2004–2017); Compact crossover SUV (2018–present)
- Body style: 5-door SUV
- Layout: Transverse front-engine, front-wheel-drive / all-wheel-drive

Chronology
- Predecessor: Chevrolet Tracker; Chevrolet S-10 Blazer

The Chevrolet Equinox is a crossover SUV introduced by Chevrolet in 2004 for the 2005 model year. It was intended to replace the North American Chevrolet Tracker and Chevrolet S-10 Blazer. The third-generation Equinox also replaced the first-generation Chevrolet Captiva.

An all-electric battery-powered (BEV) version called the Equinox EV was introduced in 2022 with sales starting in 2023 for the 2024 model year. It adopts a separate design and underpinnings from the internal combustion engine powered Equinox.

== First generation (2005) ==
First generation
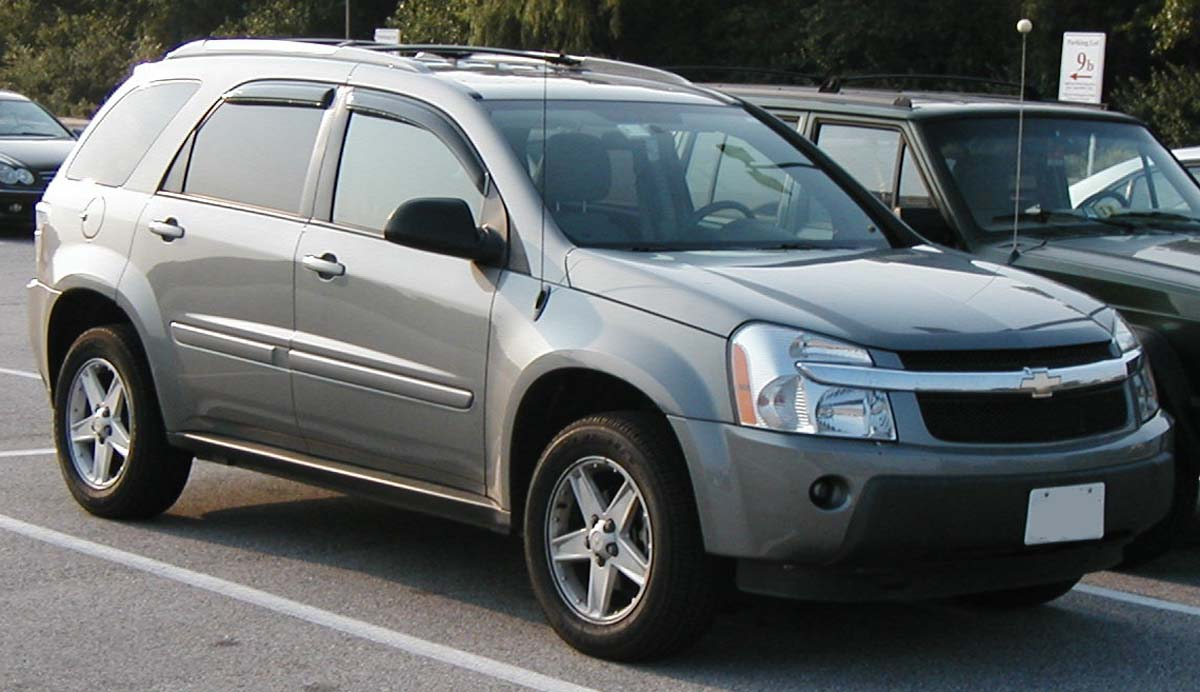

Overview
- Also called: Pontiac Torrent; GM HydroGen4 (hydrogen fuel cell version)
- Production: January 2004 – May 2009
- Model years: 2005–2009 (Equinox); 2006–2009 (Torrent)
- Assembly: Canada: Ingersoll, Ontario (CAMI)

Body and chassis
- Class: Mid-size crossover SUV
- Platform: GM Theta platform/GMT191
- Related: Saturn Vue; Suzuki XL7; Pontiac Torrent

Powertrain
- Engine: Gasoline: 3.4 L LNJ V6; 3.6 L LY7 V6
- Transmission: 5-speed Aisin AF33 automatic; 6-speed GM–Ford 6T70 automatic

Dimensions
- Wheelbase: 112.5 in (2,857 mm)
- Length: 188.8 in (4,796 mm)
- Width: 71.4 in (1,814 mm)
- Height: 68.3–69.3 in (1,735–1,760 mm)
- Curb weight: 3,660–3,776 lb (1,660–1,713 kg) (Equinox); 3,660–4,060 lb (1,660–1,842 kg) (Torrent)

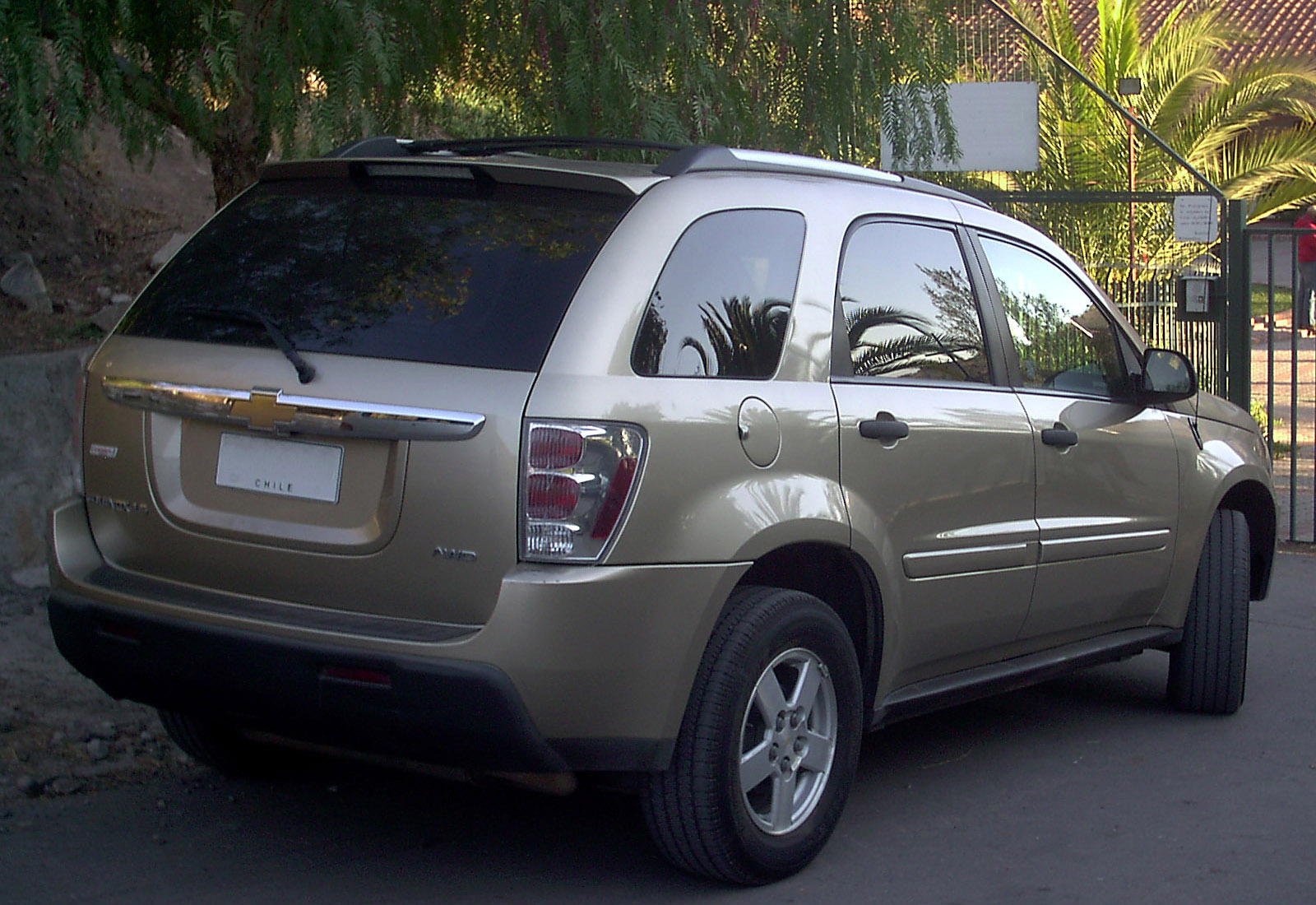
Rear view

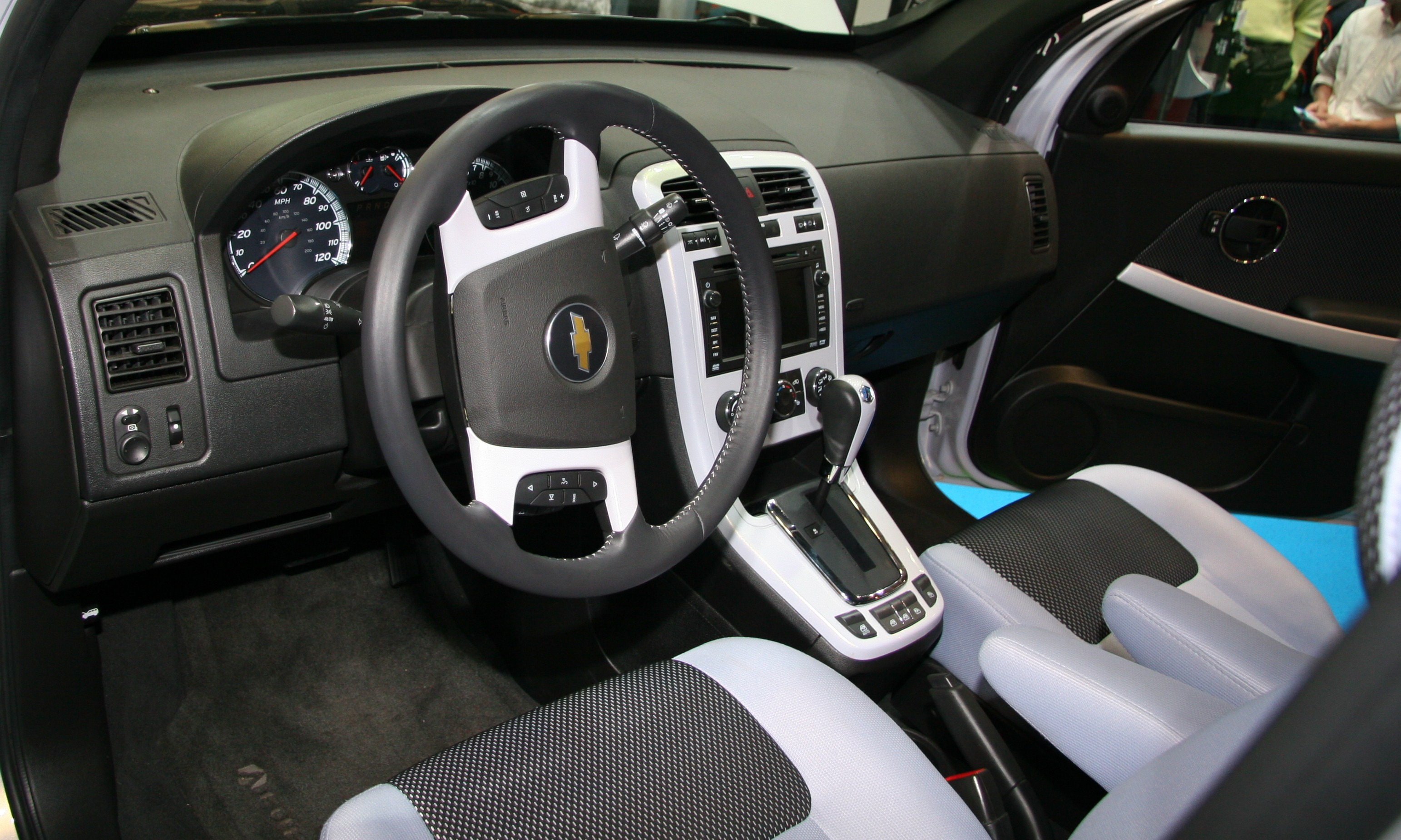
Interior

The Chevrolet Equinox was introduced in 2004 at the 2003 North American International Auto Show for the 2005 model year; its mechanical twin, the Pontiac Torrent, was introduced in 2005 at the 2005 Los Angeles Auto Show for the 2006 model year. A unique feature on the Equinox was its sliding rear bench seat dubbed "Multi-Flex".

Riding on the GM Theta platform, the unibody is mechanically similar to the Saturn Vue and the Suzuki XL7. However, the Equinox and the Torrent are larger than the Vue, riding on a 112.5 in (2,858 mm) wheelbase, 5.9 in (150 mm) longer than the Vue. Front-wheel drive is standard, with optional all-wheel drive. They are not designed for off-roading unlike the truck-based Chevrolet Tahoe and TrailBlazer.

For the 2006 model year, GM updated the Equinox for the first time, adding GM badges on the front doors, as well as recoloring the dashboard panel from grey to black. Heated seats became available with the cloth interior, and the rear seats now featured smaller headrests for improved rear visibility. The transmission shifter knob and HVAC controls were also updated. Outside, LS models now featured a standard body-color front bumper (instead of black), while LT models now featured body-color outside mirrors.

The Equinox and Torrent received several interior and mechanical updates for 2007. The instrument cluster was redesigned with a trip computer display, replacing the Saturn-sourced unit. There were also some mechanical updates: the gear ratios of the five-speed transmission were revised for improved fuel economy, brakes now have rear vented discs instead of drums, and the fuel tank size is now 20.5 US gallons (on FWD) or 16.6 US gallons (on AWD), instead of the previous 17-US-gallon size on both models.

The first-generation Equinox and Torrent were produced exclusively at the CAMI Automotive GM/Suzuki joint venture plant in Ingersoll, Ontario, Canada. The 3.4 L LNJ V6 engine is made in China (by Shanghai GM), while the Aisin AF33 transmission is made in Japan. Starting with the 2008 model year, the Equinox Sport and Torrent GXP were available with a 3.6-liter DOHC V6 engine that was made in the United States.

Production ended in May 2009.

The Chevrolet Equinox was not sold in Mexico during the 2009 model year.

=== Pontiac Torrent ===
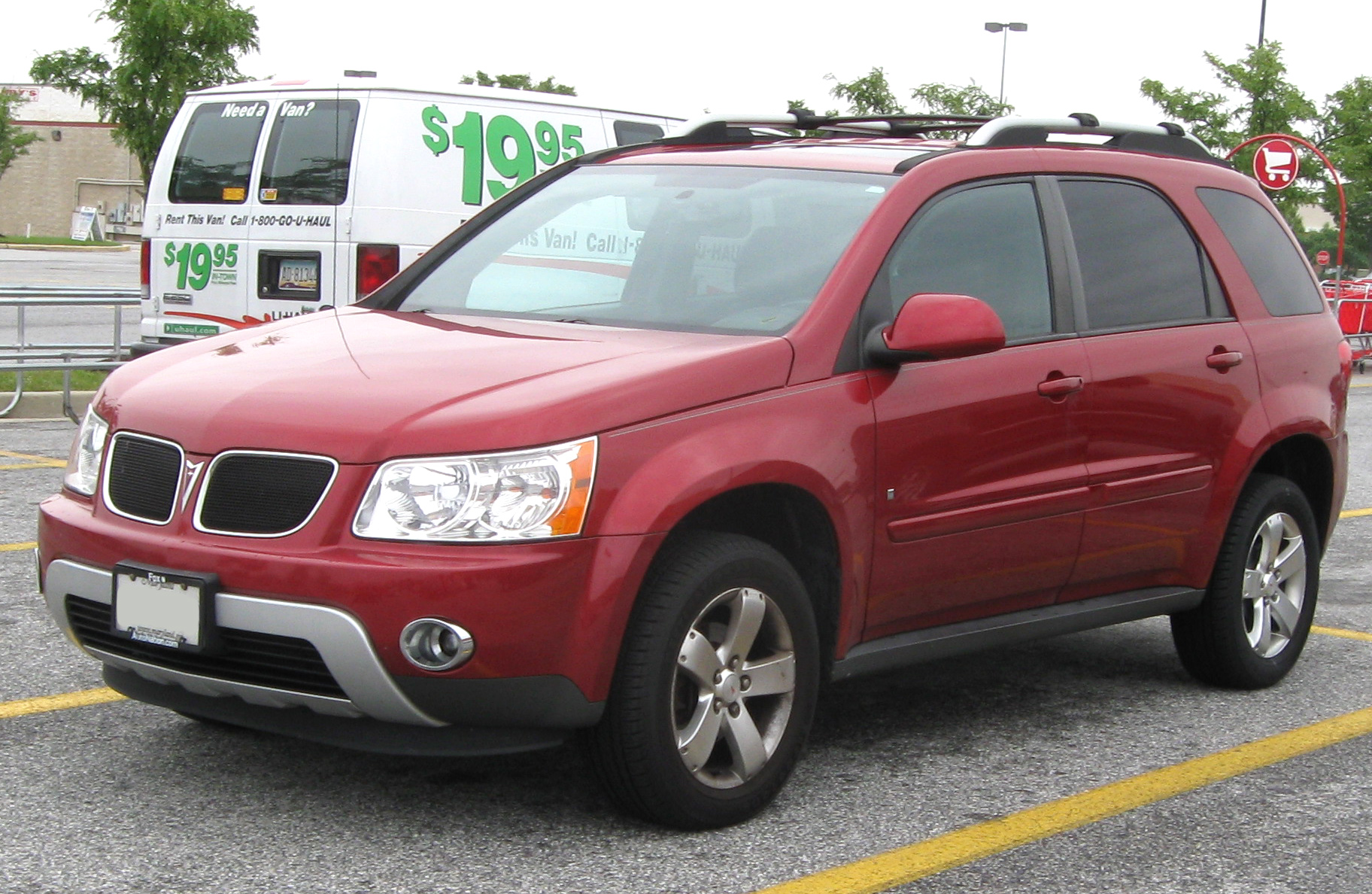
Pontiac Torrent

While the Torrent shares its basic body structure and mechanicals with the Equinox, it does have a different front and rear styling.

The Torrent was discontinued after the 2009 model year as part of the discontinuation of the Pontiac brand, with the last one rolling off the assembly line on September 2, 2009. A Buick Theta crossover SUV was to be made, effectively taking place of the Pontiac Torrent. Instead, GM replaced the Torrent with the GMC Terrain, which shares the Theta platform with the second-generation Equinox.

=== Engines ===
Years	Engine	Power	Torque
2005–2009	3.4 L LNJ V6	185 hp (138 kW; 188 PS)	210 lb⋅ft (285 N⋅m; 29 kg⋅m)
2008–2009	3.6 L LY7 V6	264 hp (197 kW; 268 PS)	250 lb⋅ft (339 N⋅m; 35 kg⋅m)

=== Sport trims ===
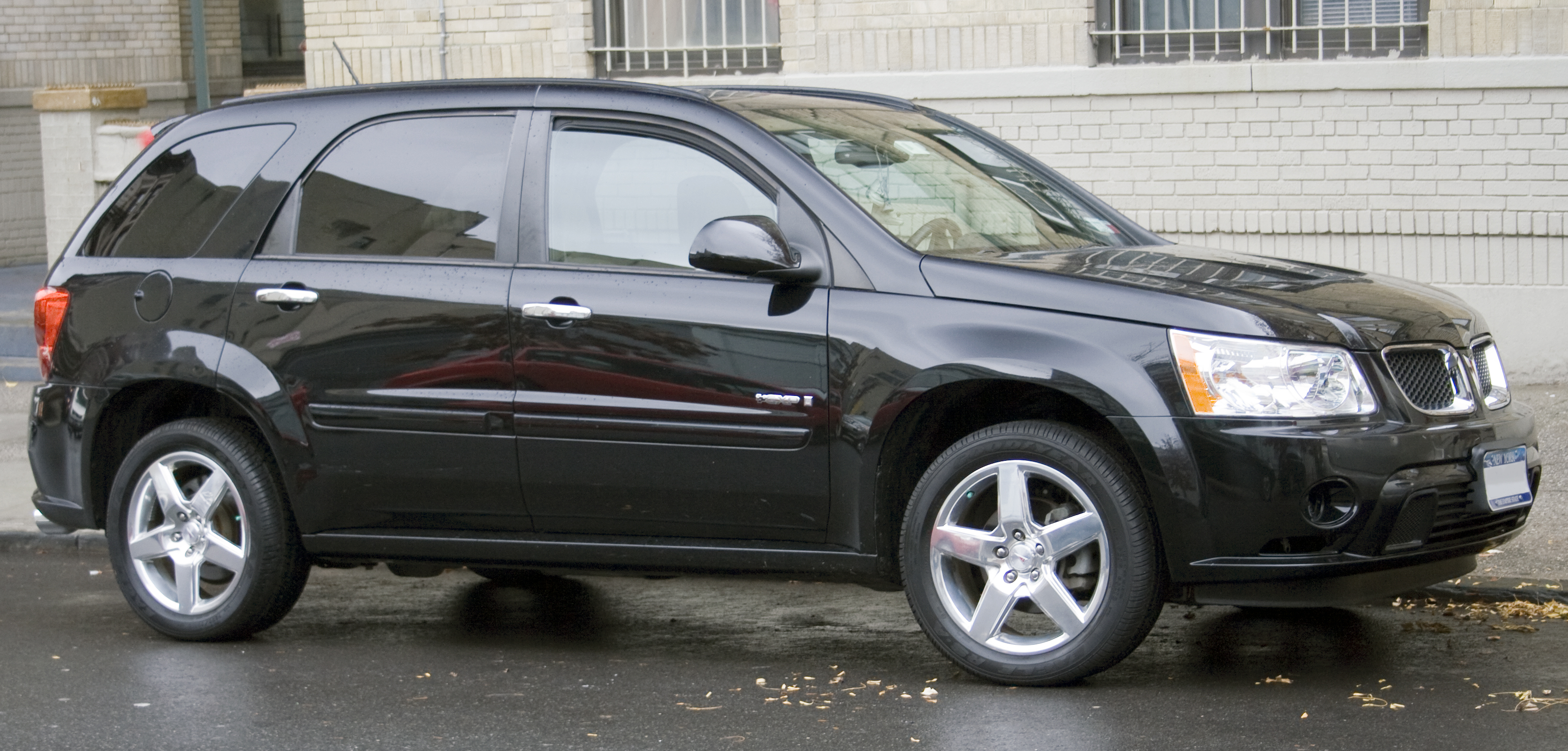
2008 Pontiac Torrent GXP

For the 2008 and 2009 model years, GM offered different versions of the Equinox and Torrent; called Sport and GXP, respectively. Featuring a 3.6-liter LY7 DOHC V6 engine and a 6-speed automatic transmission (with Manual Tap Up/Down shifting capability). This larger and more powerful (264 hp (197 kW; 268 PS) or 40% increase) engine allowed acceleration from 0 to 60 mph (0 to 97 km/h) in under seven seconds.

These models also received a 1 in (25 mm) lowered ride height with a performance-tuned suspension and unique front and rear body kits. The lower stance is accented by the 18-inch 5-spoke chrome wheels and the absence of the roof rack, giving them a smoother design flow compared to the standard models. The GXP had twin hood scoops, hydraulic power-assisted steering (as opposed to the electric power-assisted standard Torrent), improved interior trim with unique gauges, and a dual chrome-tipped exhaust.

Optional features included navigation, heated sport leather seats, DVD entertainment system, a sunroof, and all-wheel drive. GM stated the Equinox Sport was the first vehicle to reflect its more cautious naming standards. GM also prominently promoted the Pontiac Torrent GXP in television advertisements by touting its horsepower advantage over the BMW X3, in an effort to brand Pontiac more as a direct, low-cost rival to BMW.

=== Equinox LTZ ===
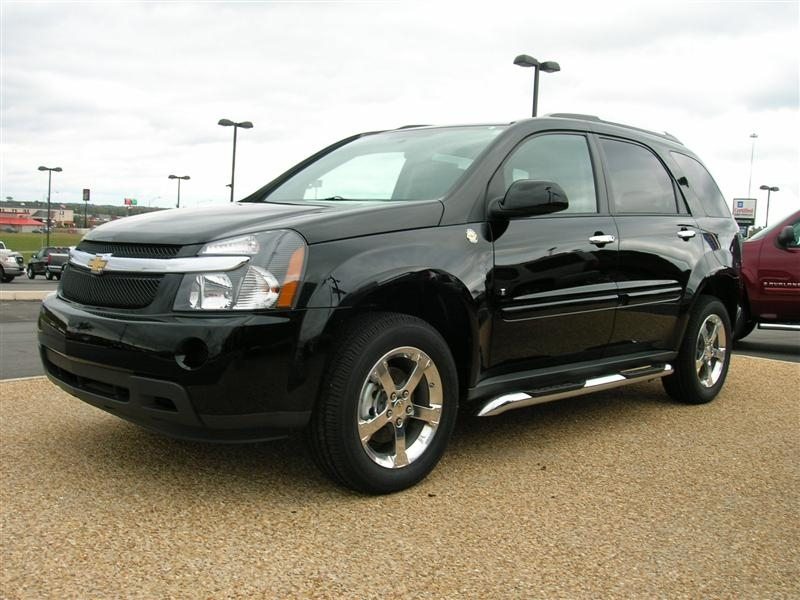
Chevrolet Equinox LTZ

An Equinox LTZ model was added for the 2008 model year. It is differentiated by its 17-inch chrome-clad aluminum wheels, chrome door handles, and chrome luggage rack side rail inserts. Standard interior features include heated front seats, leather seating inserts, head curtain side-impact airbags, AM/FM stereo with six-disc in-dash CD changer and MP3 capability, and a Pioneer premium seven-speaker audio system. The Equinox LTZ came with the same ride and handling package as LS and LT models.

=== Olympic-themed special editions ===
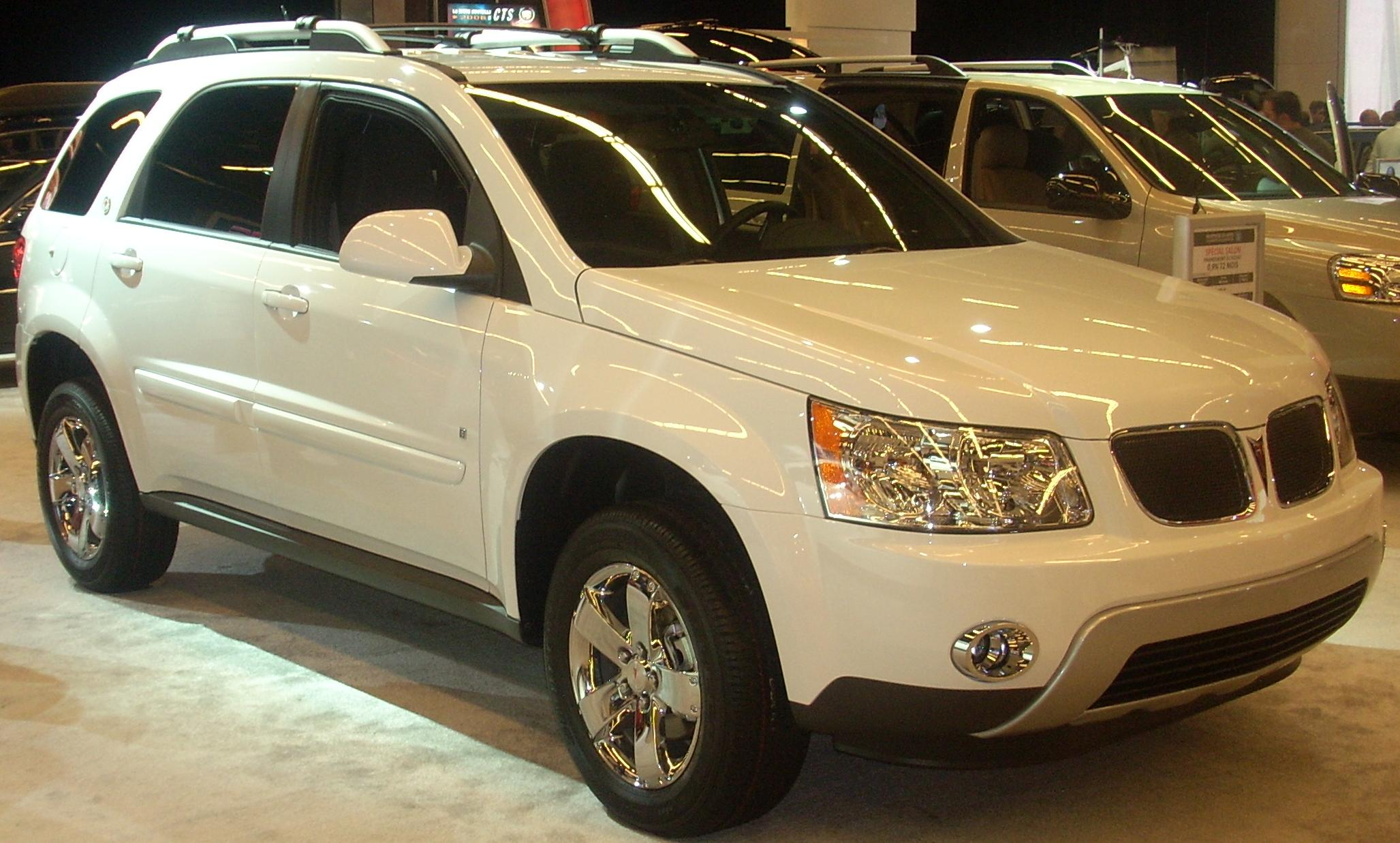
2008 Pontiac Torrent Podium Edition at the Montreal Auto Show

For the 2008 model year, in tribute to the Vancouver 2010 Winter Olympic Games, the Equinox and Torrent each received a special edition, the Team Canada Edition and the Podium Edition, respectively. This package added chrome-clad wheels and special badging. These trims were sold only in Canada.

== Second generation (2010) ==
Second generation
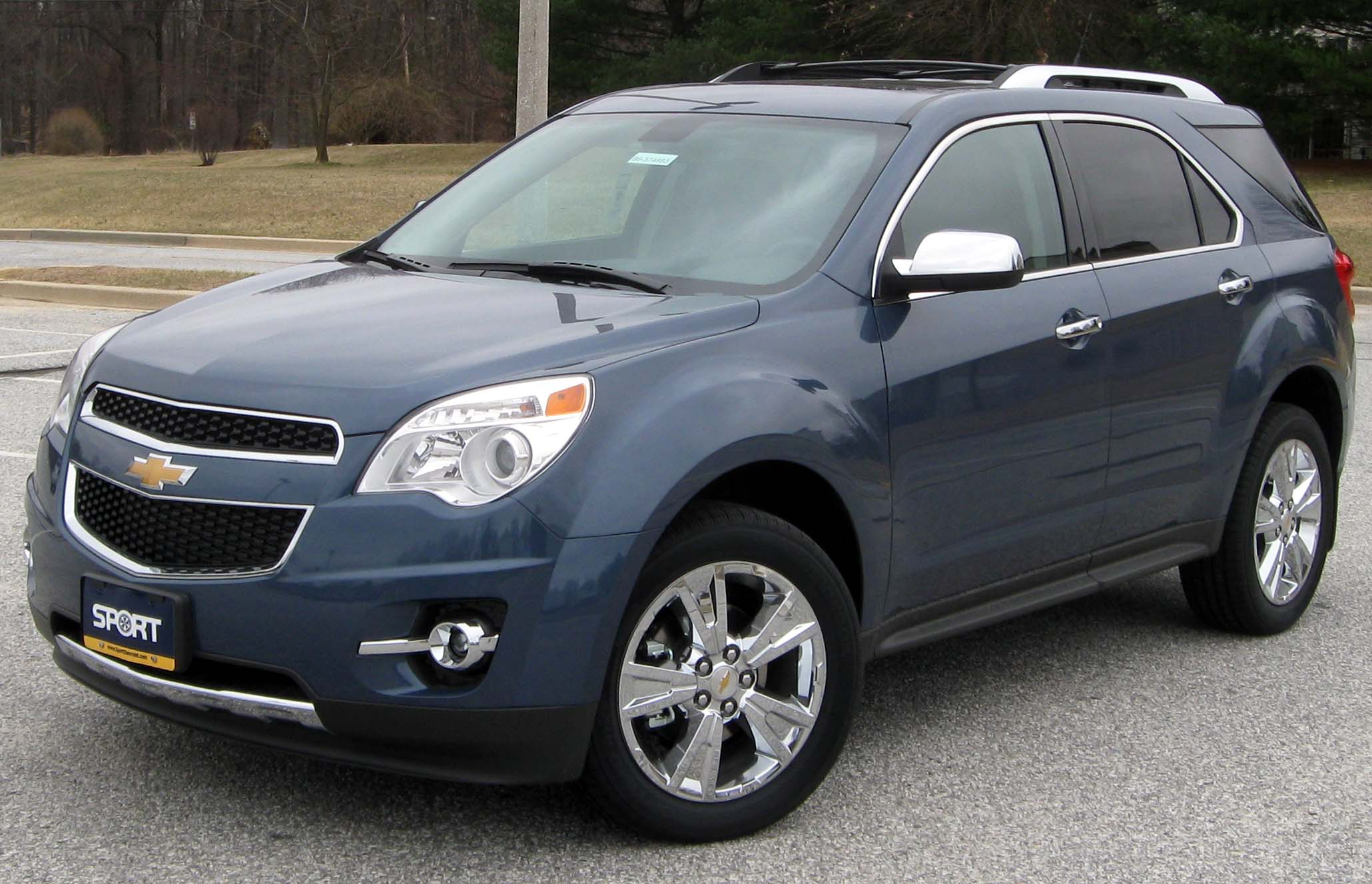

Overview
- Production: June 2009 – 2017
- Model years: 2010–2017
- Assembly: Canada: Ingersoll, Ontario (CAMI); Oshawa, Ontario (Oshawa Car Assembly) (2011–2017); United States: Spring Hill, Tennessee (2013–2015)
- Designer: Ron Aselton

Body and chassis
- Class: Mid-size crossover SUV
- Platform: GM Theta platform/GMT172
- Related: GMC Terrain; Cadillac SRX; Saab 9-4X; Saturn Vue; Pontiac Torrent; Opel Antara; Suzuki XL7

Powertrain
- Engine: Gasoline: 2.4 L LAF I4; 2.4 L LEA I4; 3.0 L LF1 or LFW V6; 3.6 L LFX V6
- Transmission: 6-speed automatic

Dimensions
- Wheelbase: 112.5 in (2,857 mm)
- Length: 187.8 in (4,770 mm)
- Width: 72.5 in (1,842 mm)
- Height: 66.3 in (1,684 mm)

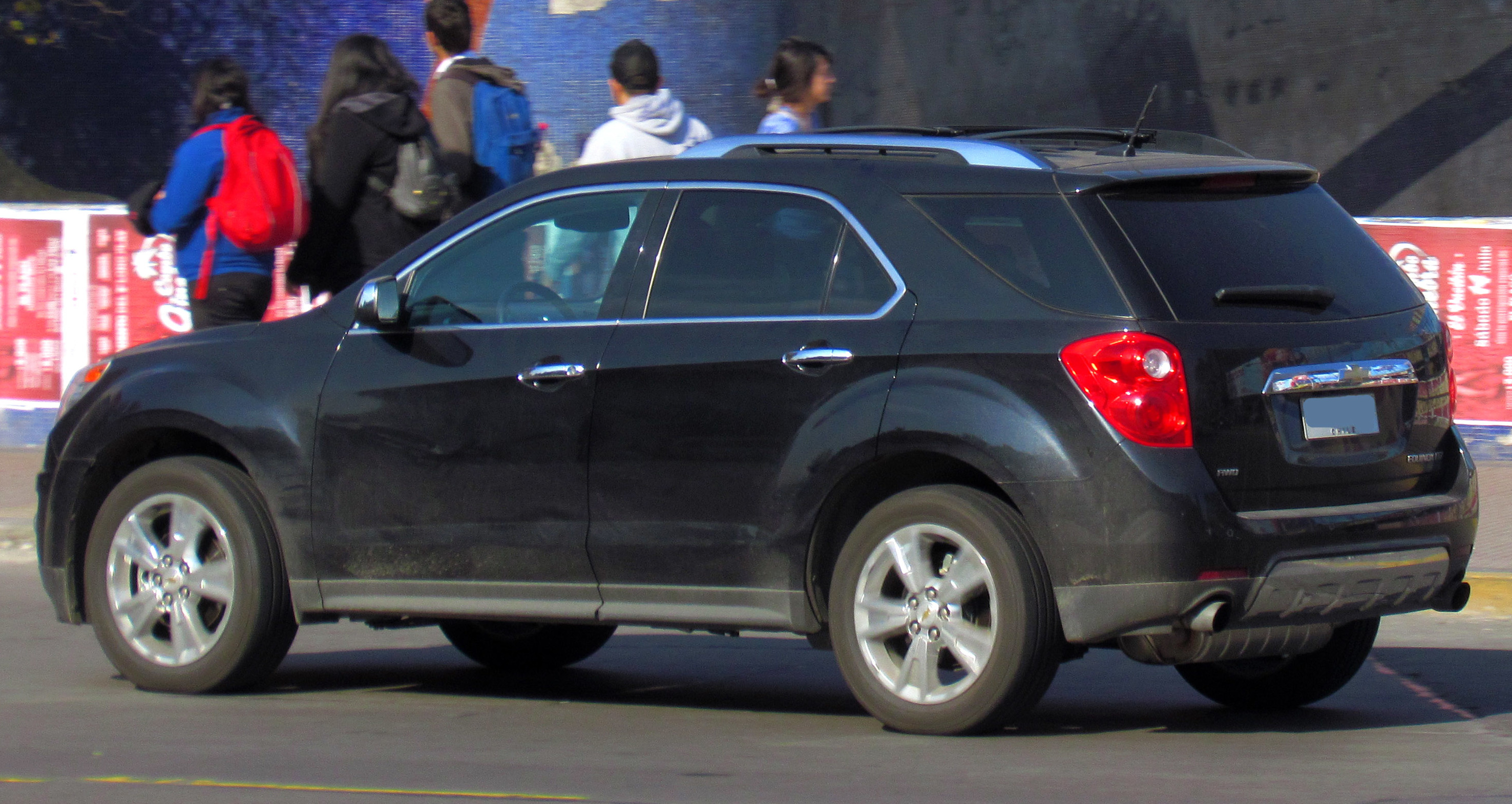
Chevrolet Equinox LTZ AWD (Chile)

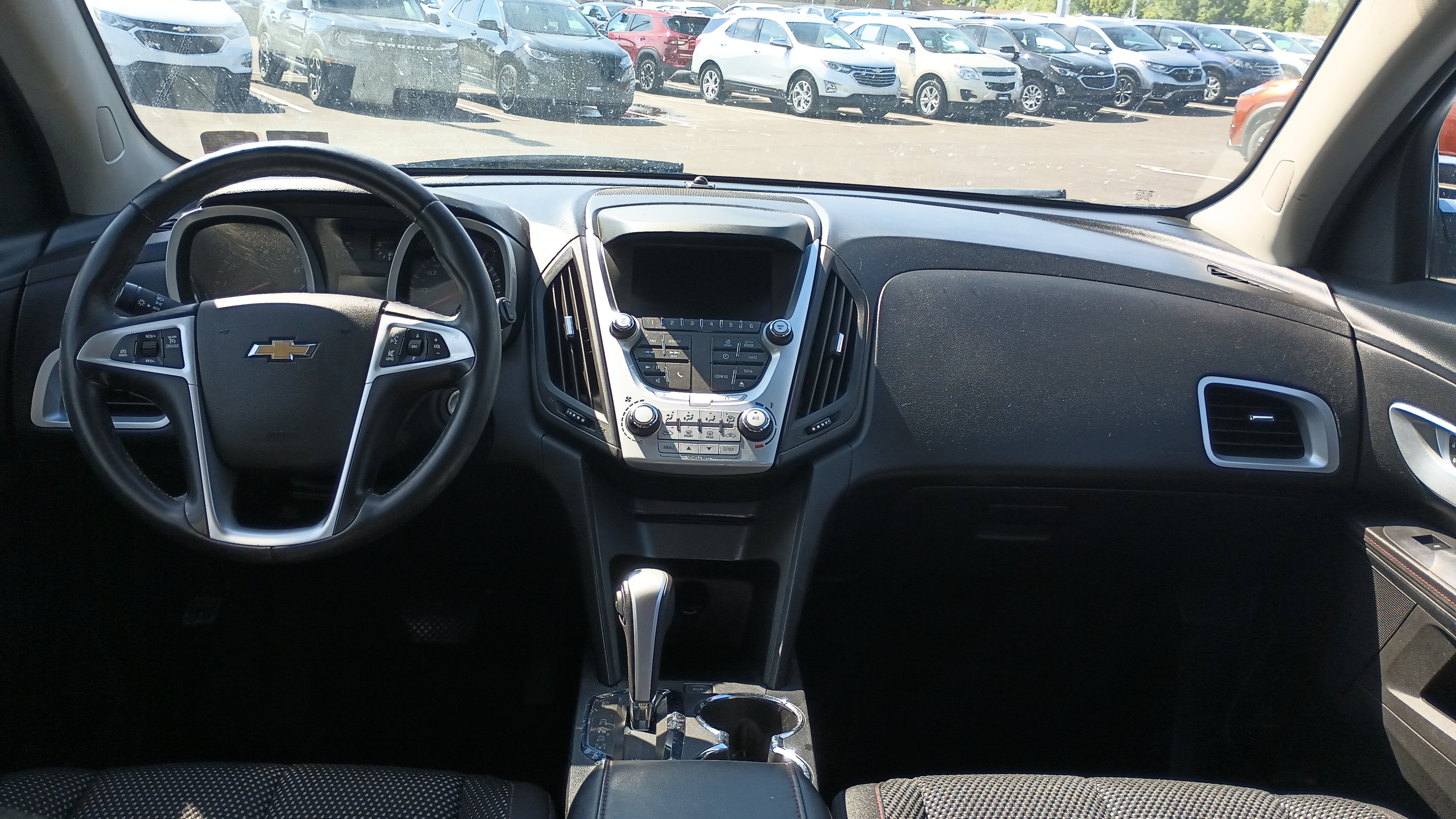
Interior

The second-generation Equinox was announced by GM on December 21, 2008, and debuted at the 2009 North American International Auto Show in Detroit. The 2010 Equinox went on sale in June 2009. It is built on a stiffened version of the same "Theta" platform used in the previous model. The second-generation Equinox was built with a pair of upgraded gasoline direct injection engines, with better fuel economy claimed by GM. Earlier 2010 models had the GM badges on the front doors but were later deleted. It also features the Multi-Flex sliding rear bench seat and an optional height-programmable power liftgate. Laminated front door glass was standard on all models.

Marketing of the Chevrolet Equinox resumed in Mexico in late November 2009, for the 2010 model year after a year of absence, but ceased after the 2011 model year. However, in October 2015, the Equinox was reintroduced in Mexico to replace the Captiva Sport for the 2016 model year.

The second-generation Equinox is available standard with a 2.4-liter Ecotec I4 engine (produced in Tonawanda, New York, and Spring Hill, Tennessee), while a 3.0-liter V6 engine is available as an option on LT and LTZ trims. All four-cylinder models come with a fuel economy mode, which alters the drivetrain's behavior for improved fuel economy and is engaged by pressing the "eco" button on the front center console. Four-cylinder models have electric power steering, while V6 models have the more conventional hydraulic power steering. Both powertrains are mated to a six-speed automatic transmission and an optional all-wheel-drive system, with front-wheel drive being standard.

This generation of Equinox was assembled in three plants: Ingersoll and Oshawa (both in Ontario), and Spring Hill, Tennessee. The latter two plants only produced models with the 2.4-liter Ecotec engine, with Oshawa only producing front-wheel-drive models.

=== Model year changes ===
==== 2011 ====
For 2011, the 3.0-liter V6 engine received flex-fuel capability. The compass on the Driver Information Center now became standard on all models, while LT models now came standard with Bluetooth and a USB port. 2LT models also received standard heated cloth front seats. On LS models, the "LS" badge on the liftgate was removed.

==== 2012 ====
For the 2012 model year, the 2.4-liter Ecotec I4 engine received flex-fuel capability. The 2012 model year introduced the Chevrolet MyLink telematics system to the Equinox, beginning in Spring 2012. Bluetooth connectivity is now standard on all models, while a seven-inch touch screen radio and backup camera are now standard on the 1LT trim in addition to the 2LT and LTZ trims. Exterior mirrors now featured a convex portion for improved blind-spot visibility. A forward-collision and lane-departure alert system also became available on V6 LTZ models.

==== 2013 ====
For the 2013 model year, a new direct-injected 3.6-liter V6 became available on LT and LTZ models, providing 301 horsepower (224 kW; 305 PS) and 272 lb⋅ft (369 N⋅m; 38 kg⋅m) of torque. This engine offered 14 percent more horsepower and 22 percent more torque than the previous 3.0-liter V-6, with the same EPA-estimated fuel economy. A new FE2 suspension package, with front dual-flow dampers, was offered, optional on the LTZ V6 and packaged with 18-inch or 19-inch chrome-clad aluminum wheels.

Additional new features for 2013 models included a dual-player DVD entertainment system, a power convenience package (including universal home remote and eight-way power front passenger seat), and a safety package with lane departure warning system, forward collision warning, and rear park assist (available on all 2LT and LTZ models). A USB port became standard on all models.

==== 2014 ====
For the 2014 model year, chrome-clad wheels became standard on LTZ models. Chrome exterior door handles and mirror caps were also available on LT models as part of the Chrome Package.

==== 2015 ====
The 2015 model year saw the addition of OnStar with 4G LTE and built-in Wi-Fi hotspot, which included a 3GB/three-month data trial, standard on LT and LTZ models, with navigation available on LTZ and 2LT. A new level trim, L, was introduced as the base trim; derived from the LS trim, it was sold exclusively to retail markets and only available in front-wheel drive with the 2.4-liter Ecotec engine, and did not come with rear floor mats, the digital compass, or SiriusXM radio. The flex-fuel capability option for the 3.6-liter V6 was discontinued.

==== 2016 ====
For 2016, the Chevrolet Equinox received its first mid-cycle refresh (along with its cousin, the GMC Terrain), which was unveiled at the 2015 Chicago Auto Show on February 12, 2015. This Equinox received a new grille, headlights, wheels, and front fascia, as well as reworked tail lights. On the interior, the Equinox gained a new gear selector, a second storage shelf underneath the dashboard (in the place of the discontinued CD player), as well as deletion of the door lock buttons from the dashboard. The 1LT and 2LT trims were merged into a single LT trim. Also, front-wheel-drive models could no longer be had with the 3.6-liter V6 engine. Models equipped with the V6 engine received redesigned dual chrome exhaust tips (borrowed from the GMC Terrain Denali).

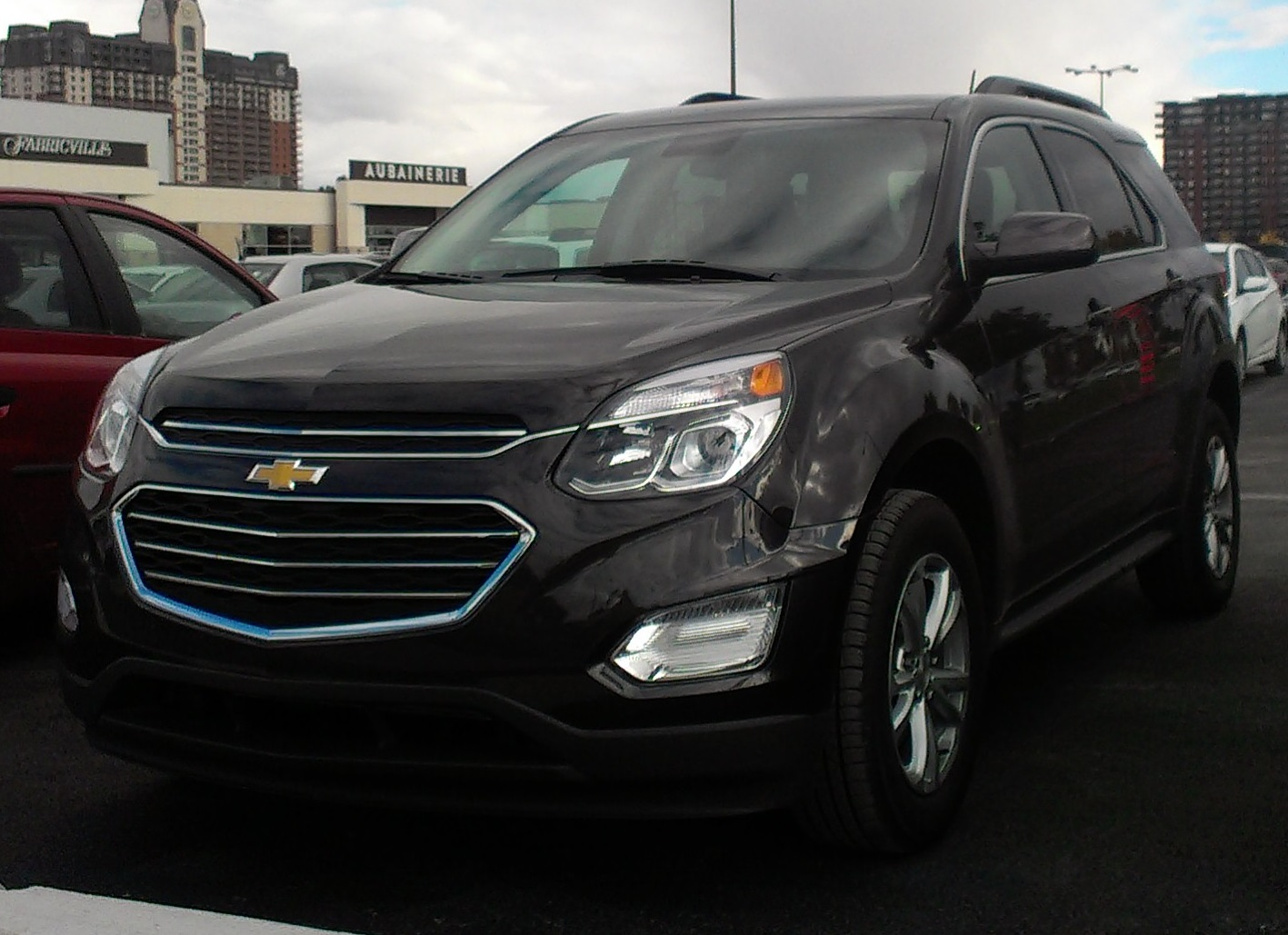
2016 Chevrolet Equinox

All Equinox trims featured projector-style front headlights, backup camera, and the Chevrolet MyLink 7-inch touch-screen infotainment system. The OnStar delete feature was removed along with the rear-seat DVD entertainment system and 19-inch wheels.

==== 2017 ====
For 2017, the final model year of this generation, the Equinox received two new appearance packages—a Midnight Edition package and a Sport package. Both packages featured 18-inch black-painted five-spoke aluminum wheels, black exterior Chevrolet emblems, black accented grille and rear fascia, black roof-rack cross bars, Jet Black perforated leather-appointed seats, and memory driver seat and exterior mirrors. The Midnight Edition had black exterior paint, while the Sport package had white exterior paint; both packages were only available with the 2.4-liter Ecotec engine. The 18-inch chrome-clad aluminum wheels were discontinued. The LTZ trim was renamed Premier, while the Equinox badge was moved from the right side of the liftgate to the left.

=== Engines ===
Years	Engine	Power	Torque	Availability
2010–2011	2.4 L Ecotec LAF I4	182 hp (136 kW; 185 PS)	172 lb⋅ft (233 N⋅m; 24 kg⋅m)	All models
2012–2017	2.4 L Ecotec LEA I4	182 hp (136 kW; 185 PS)	172 lb⋅ft (233 N⋅m; 24 kg⋅m)	All models Flex-fuel capability optional
2010–2012	3.0 L High Feature LF1/LFW V6	264 hp (197 kW; 268 PS)	222 lb⋅ft (301 N⋅m; 31 kg⋅m)	Optional on LT and LTZ Flex-fuel capability optional for 2011–2012
2013–2017	3.6 L High Feature LFX V6	301 hp (224 kW; 305 PS)	272 lb⋅ft (369 N⋅m; 38 kg⋅m)	Optional on LT and LTZ/Premier Flex-fuel option dropped for 2015

Notes:

- All four-cylinder models have a single rear exhaust port, while all V6 models have dual rear exhaust ports.
- All output ratings are on regular gasoline.

=== EPA fuel economy ratings ===
Skepticism about the Equinox's EPA fuel economy ratings has been raised after a number of road tests at the model's launch achieved 20 to 30% lower fuel economy than the official EPA ratings. After achieving 18.8 mpg_{‑US} (12.5 L/100 km; 22.6 mpg_{‑imp}) in a road test, Edmunds InsideLine stated, "...our testing didn't come close to achieving [the EPA's numbers], even though we're usually within 1 mpg of the EPA combined number." Car and Driver recorded another 18 mpg_{‑US} (13 L/100 km; 22 mpg_{‑imp}) figure and noted its "...fuel economy that won’t live up to the 22 mpg_{‑US} (11 L/100 km; 26 mpg_{‑imp})/32 mpg_{‑US} (7.4 L/100 km; 38 mpg_{‑imp}) EPA ratings in real-world use...". Green Car Reports recorded as much as 25.8 mpg_{‑US} (9.1 L/100 km; 31.0 mpg_{‑imp}) on a road trip, driving almost exclusively highway miles in "Eco" mode; this is about 20% below the published highway EPA rating. AutoWeek only averaged 23 mpg_{‑US} (10 L/100 km; 28 mpg_{‑imp}). The Truth About Cars published an editorial suggesting that GM "inflated" the Equinox's fuel economy ratings for public relations purposes and that the trip computer inaccurately reports fuel economy reported to the driver.

Motorweek, however, managed to achieve 29.3 mpg_{‑US} (8.0 L/100 km; 35.2 mpg_{‑imp}) with their test car during mixed driving. LeftlaneNews.com was also able to average 28 mpg_{‑US} (8.4 L/100 km; 34 mpg_{‑imp}) average in mixed city and highway driving.

=== Safety ===
The 2010 Equinox was awarded "Top Safety Pick" by IIHS.

IIHS scores (2010)
Moderate overlap front (original test)	Good
Side (original test)	Good
Roof strength	Good
Head restraints and seats	Good

== Third generation (2018) ==
Third generation
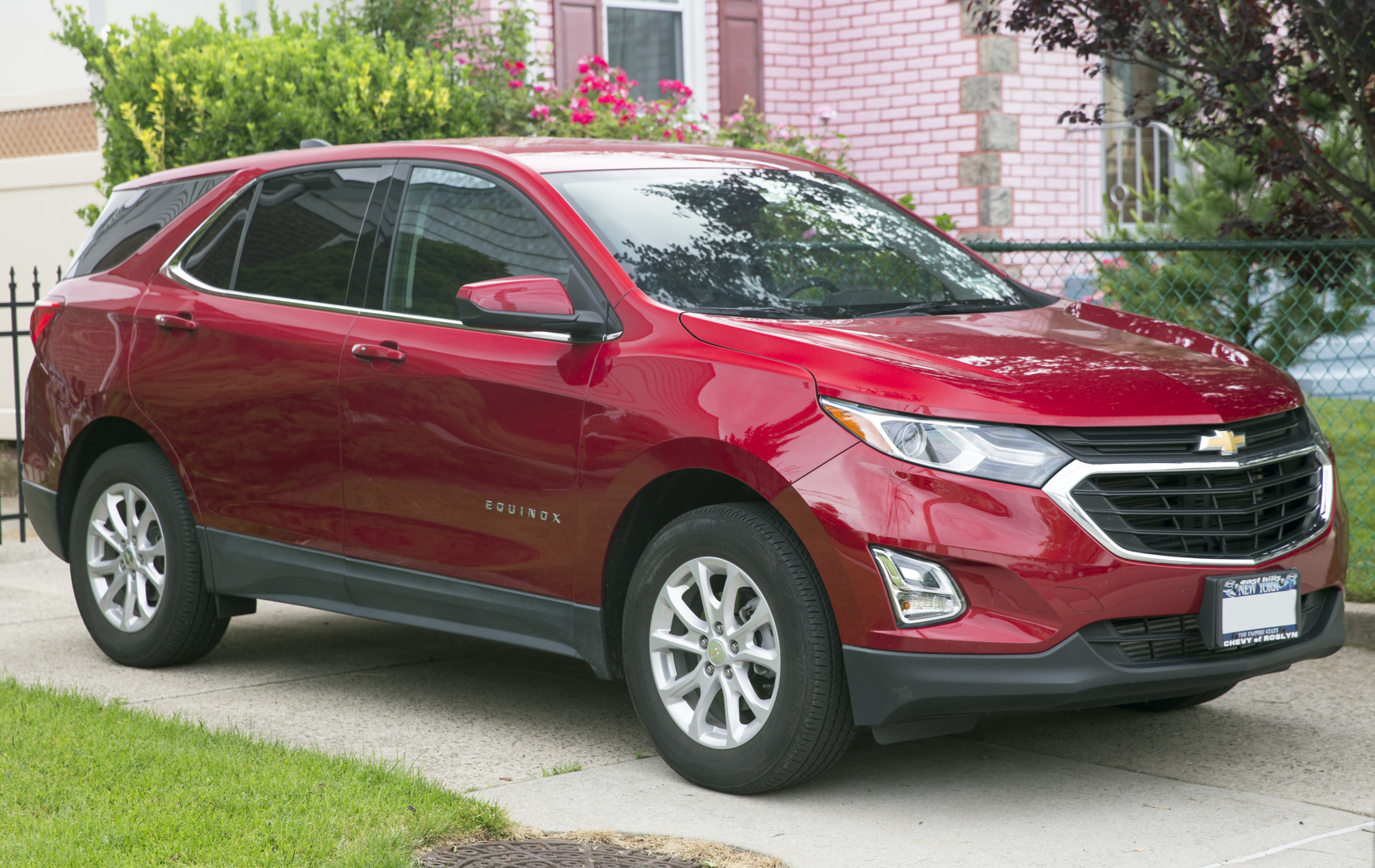

Overview
- Also called: Holden Equinox (Australia and New Zealand)
- Production: 2017–2024
- Model years: 2018–2024; 2018–2021 (Australia & New Zealand); 2018–2024 (South Korea)
- Assembly: Canada: Ingersoll, Ontario (CAMI) (2017–2022); China: Wuhan, Hubei (SAIC-GM); Mexico: Ramos Arizpe, Coahuila (Ramos Arizpe Assembly) San Luis Potosí, San Luis Potosí (San Luis Potosí Assembly)
- Designer: Jeff Perkins

Body and chassis
- Class: Compact crossover SUV
- Platform: GM D2XX
- Related: Buick Envision; GMC Terrain

Powertrain
- Engine: Gasoline: 1.5 L LYX turbo I4 (2018–2022); 1.5 L LSD turbo I4 (2023–2024); 2.0 L LTG turbo I4 (2018–2020); Diesel: 1.6 L LH7 turbo-diesel I4 (2018–2019)
- Transmission: 6-speed automatic (1.5 L and diesel); 9-speed automatic (2.0 L)

Dimensions
- Wheelbase: 107.3 in (2,725 mm)
- Length: 183.1 in (4,652 mm)
- Width: 72.6 in (1,843 mm)
- Height: 65.4 in (1,661 mm)

Chronology
- Predecessor: Chevrolet Captiva (Global, South Korea); Chevrolet Captiva Sport (North America)

Chevrolet unveiled the third-generation Equinox on September 22, 2016. Gasoline-powered variants of the 2018 Chevrolet Equinox went on sale in early 2017, while diesel-powered variants arrived in fall 2017. This generation was developed as a smaller vehicle to align itself with other vehicles in the compact crossover SUV segment, with its former role occupied by the new Chevrolet Blazer.

The third-generation Equinox also introduced a new AWD system from GKN Driveline, allowing the driver to disengage the driveshaft to reduce friction and rotational inertia when AWD is not needed by the push of a button, replacing the fully-automatic system of previous generations. Other new features that were standard on all models included a start-stop system, passive entry, active grille shutters, electronic parking brake, second-row HVAC, and umbrella storage in the front door panels. The infotainment system features a seven-inch (on L/LS/LT/RS) or eight-inch diagonal (on LT/RS/Premier) touch-screen, both coming standard with Android Auto and Apple CarPlay capability.

New safety features introduced on the third-generation Equinox include a surround-view camera, forward collision warning, low-speed automatic braking, and a Safety Alert Seat, as well as a standard Rear Seat Alert system, a feature first introduced on the 2017 GMC Acadia. While the Equinox no longer features a sliding rear seat, the rear seats can be folded by disengaging the latches on the top of the rear seats, or additionally on LT and higher trims, by using the levers on the right side of the cargo area. All models now featured tempered front door glass and rear solid disc brakes.

For 2019, the infotainment systems were upgraded with all models now featuring two USB ports on the center stack, while the second-row 12-volt power outlet was replaced with two USB charge-only ports; an SD card reader, higher-resolution backup camera, and sound system became available on higher trims. All LT models now featured a multi-color LCD on the gauge cluster. New safety features, including adaptive cruise control and front pedestrian braking, became available. The Premier badge on the liftgate was changed from a single rectangular emblem to individual letters.

For 2020, the diesel engine was discontinued because of low consumer demand. (GM originally planned to discontinue AWD on diesel models.) All Equinox models now came standard with a host of additional safety features, including forward collision alert, following distance indicator, lane keep assist, lane departure warning, forward automatic emergency brakes, and IntelliBeam automatic high-beam headlamps. The rear passive entry buttons were also removed from the exterior door handles.

For 2021, the 2.0-liter LTG turbocharged inline-four was discontinued as it only comprised around seven percent of all Equinox sales. Leather seating became available on LT models with the Confidence and Convenience Package.

The Equinox was discontinued again in the Mexican market in July 2021 because of poor sales, being indirectly replaced by the Captiva, although it is still produced in Mexico for export markets.

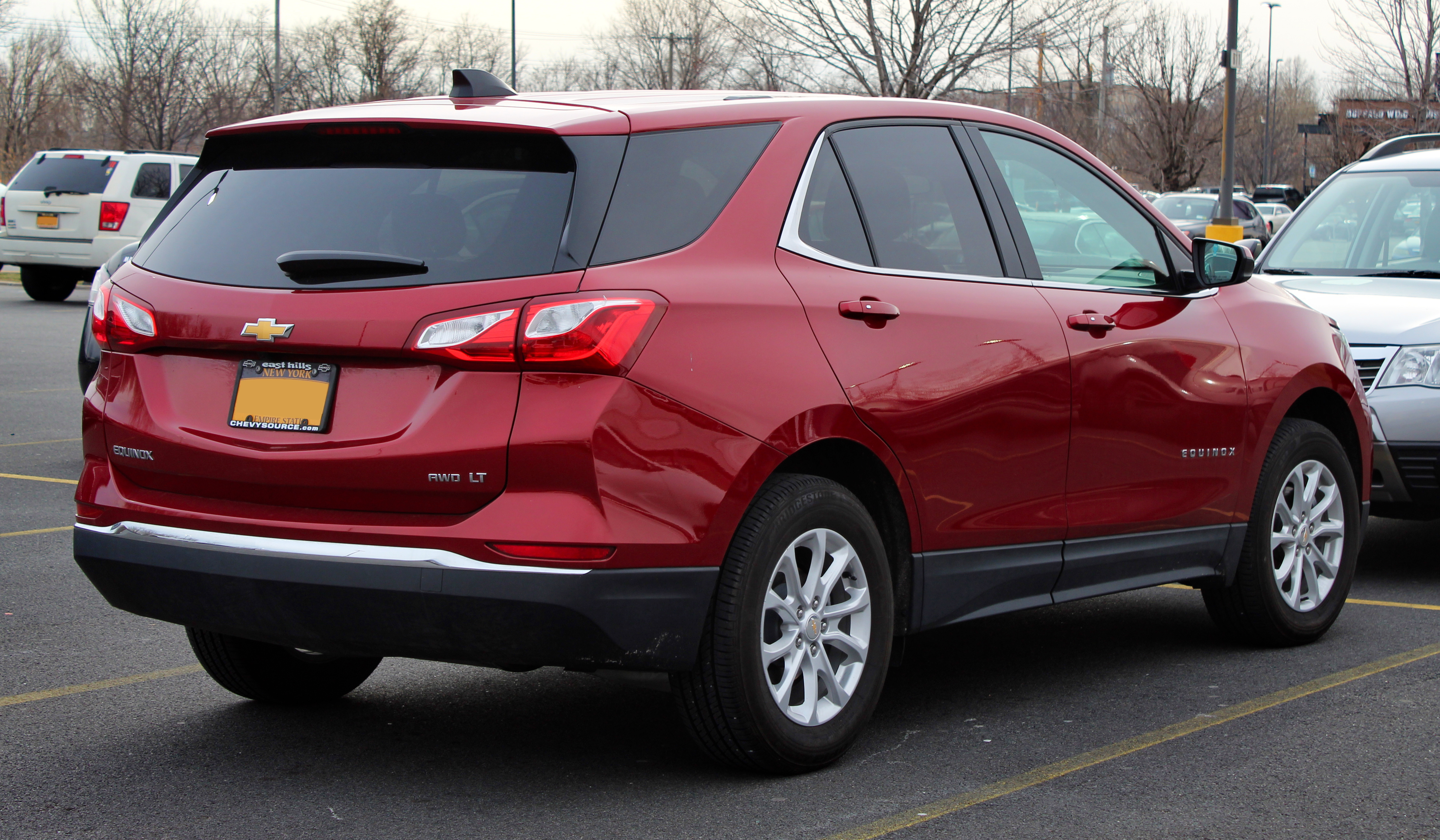
Rear view

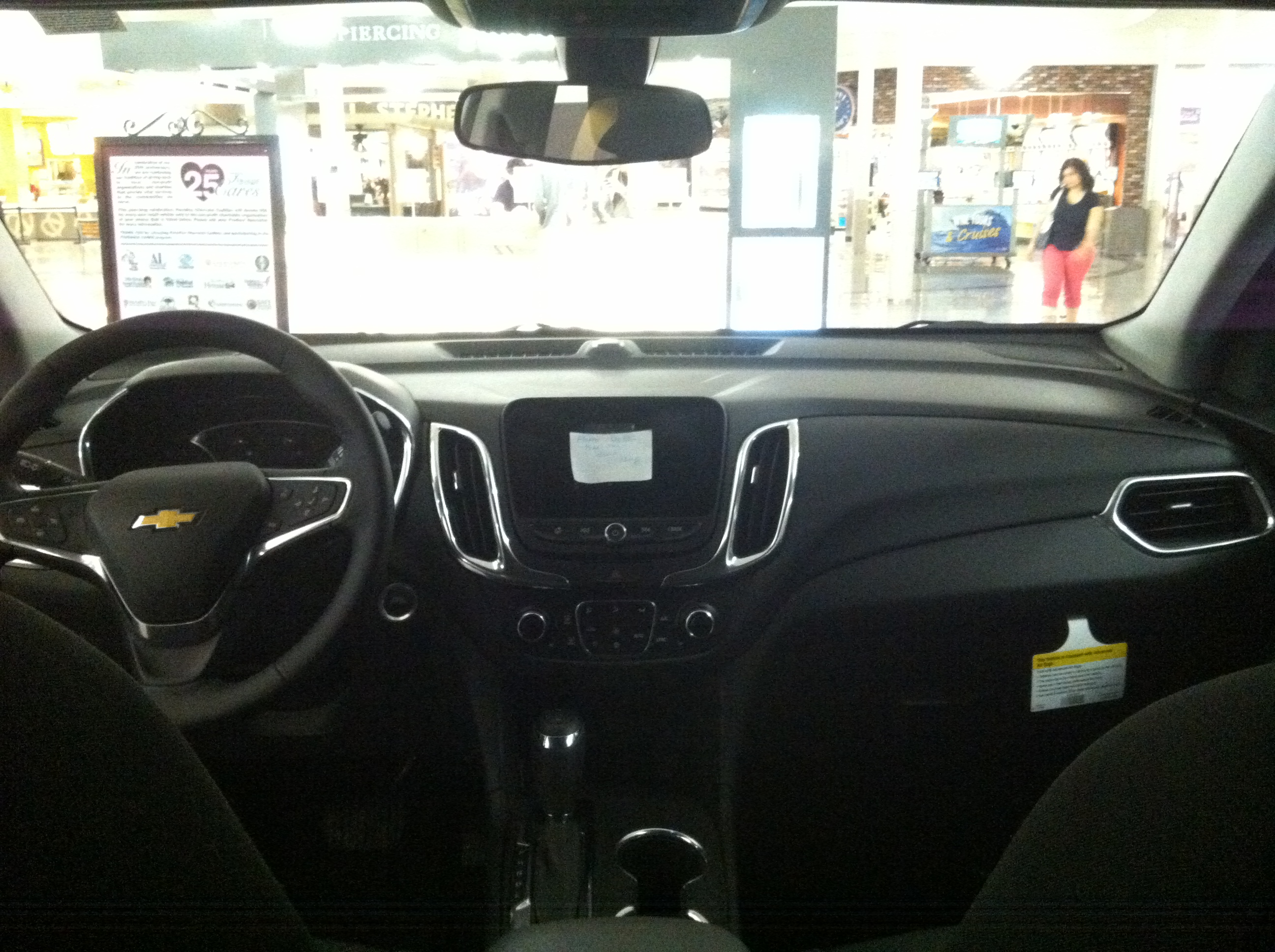
Interior

=== Trim levels ===
The third-generation Equinox is available in four trim levels: L, LS, LT, and Premier. The 1.5-liter turbo I4 is standard on all trims. The 2.0-liter turbo I4 and 1.6-liter turbo-diesel is available on LT and Premier. Front-wheel drive is standard on all trims, while all-wheel drive is available on LS and higher trims.

An appearance package was available as the Redline Edition. The Redline Edition became available in October 2017. For 2018, the Redline Edition was only available on the LT trim without the panoramic sunroof or diesel engine.

For the 2020 model year, the Midnight Edition and Sport Edition packages became available on LT models. Both packages featured blacked-out trim, including leather seating (cloth for 2021), 19-inch aluminum wheels, Chevrolet bowties, grille, fog lamp bezel surround, and window trim. The Midnight Edition was only available in the Mosaic Black Metallic exterior color, while the Sport Edition was available with most of the other colors. The Midnight trim line went on sale in Mexico in September 2019.

=== Powertrain ===
The third-generation Equinox is available with up to three turbocharged inline four-cylinder engine choices. Gasoline engines are virtually identical to the 2016 Malibu: a 1.5-liter unit that produces 170 hp (127 kW) (12 hp (9 kW) less than the 2.4-liter engine in the previous Equinox but more torque), or a 2.0-liter unit that produces 252 hp (188 kW) (48 hp (36 kW) less than the 3.6-liter V6 engine in the previous Equinox). The 2.0-liter engine was an option on the LT and Premier trims from 2018 to 2020, and models so equipped featured dual chrome exhaust tips, larger front brakes, the "2.0 T" badge on the liftgate, trailering equipment, and a 17-inch spare wheel.

For the first time, a 1.6-liter turbo-diesel I4 engine that produces 136 hp (101 kW) became available, but only on LT and Premier trims. The 2.0-liter unit is mated to a nine-speed automatic transmission, while the other two engines are mated to a six-speed automatic transmission.

=== 2022 refresh ===
On February 6, 2020, Chevrolet unveiled a refreshed Equinox at the Chicago Auto Show. The updated vehicle sports a new front grille, which extends into the redesigned headlamps, along with a restyled lower fascia with different fog lamps. The rear also sees redesigned tail lamps and rear bumper. On the interior, the cloth seats are redesigned, featuring a zig-zag pattern instead of a honeycomb pattern, and all models now have wireless Android Auto/Apple CarPlay and an auto stop-start deactivation switch.

The trim levels changed slightly, with the RS joining the primary LS, LT, and Premier offerings. The sport/street-centric RS trim is set apart by its unique front and rear stylings, black exterior accents, black badges, "Dark Android" 19-inch wheels, and quad-tip exhaust. Inside, the sport-inspired crossover features black upholstery with red contrasting stitching and an RS-branded shift knob and front passenger seat tag.

The base L trim level was dropped, making the LS trim level the base model. The Midnight and Sport editions were replaced by the new RS trim level, while the Redline edition was later offered, but on Premier instead of LT. The refreshed Equinox went on sale in the first quarter of 2021 as a 2022 model, a year later than originally planned because of the COVID-19 pandemic.

The 2022 model was only available with the 1.5-liter LYX turbo inline-four. A 2.0-liter turbo inline-four did not return for the 2022 refresh.

For 2023, the 1.5-liter LYX turbo inline-four was replaced by the 1.5-liter LSD turbo inline-four which adds a higher-pressure fuel system (from 20 MPa to 35 MPa), enhanced piston design with PVD coating, and precise intake phaser positioning optimizing efficiency which together contribute to a 5 hp increase to 175 hp over the LYX. All Equinox models now featured electro-hydraulic brakes, and the Midnight and Sport editions returned on the LS trim.

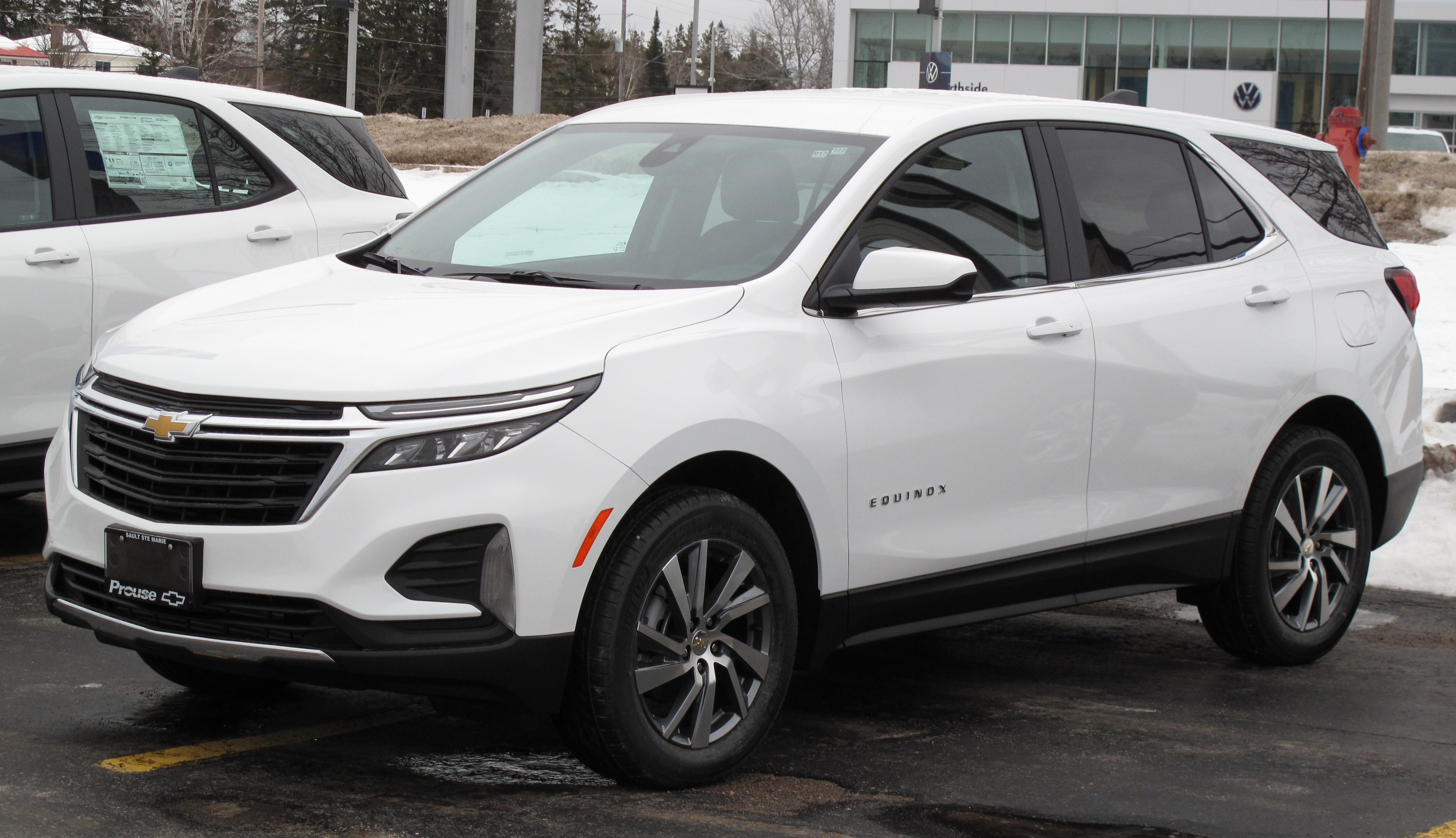
2022 Chevrolet Equinox LT AWD

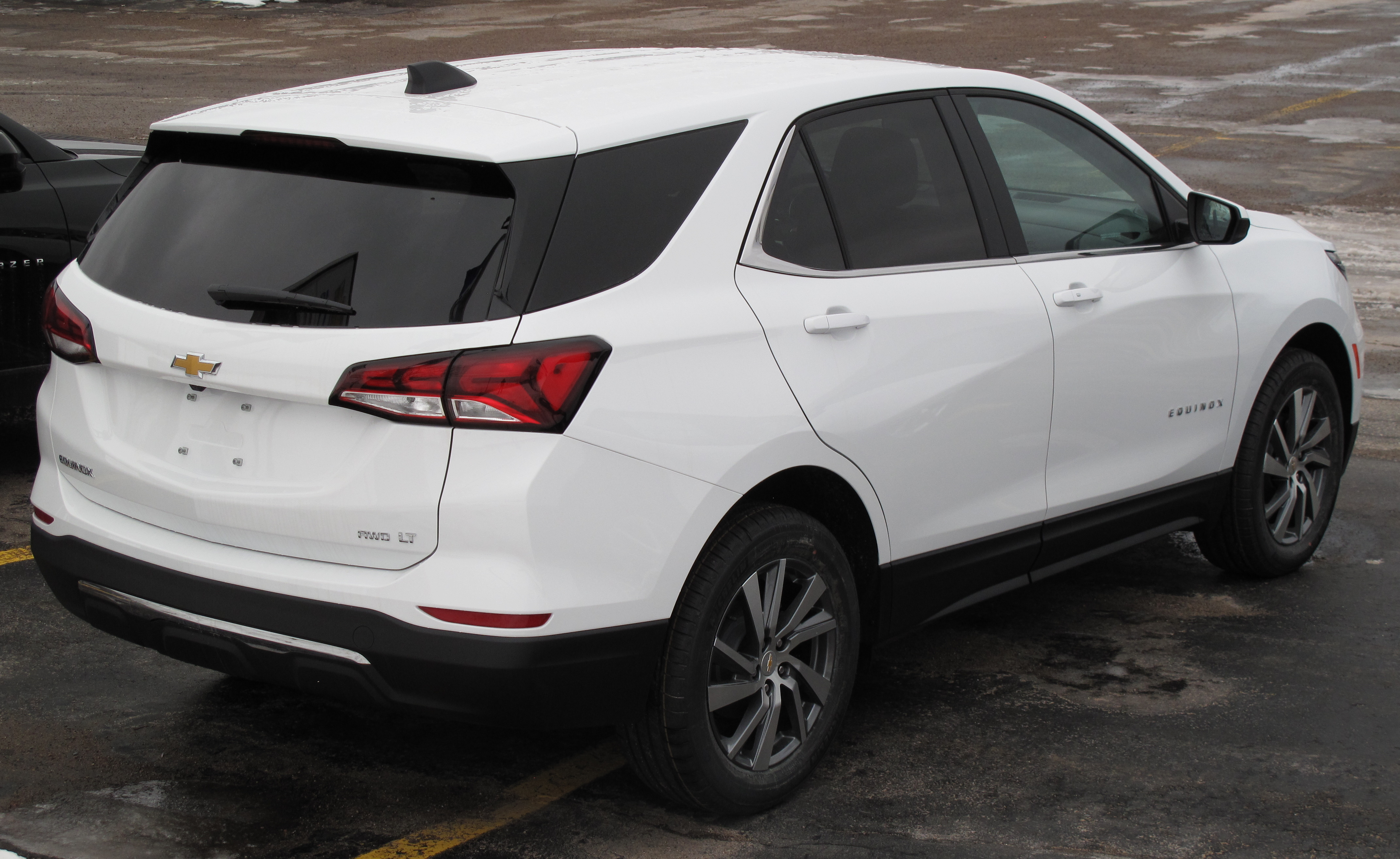
2022 Chevrolet Equinox LT AWD

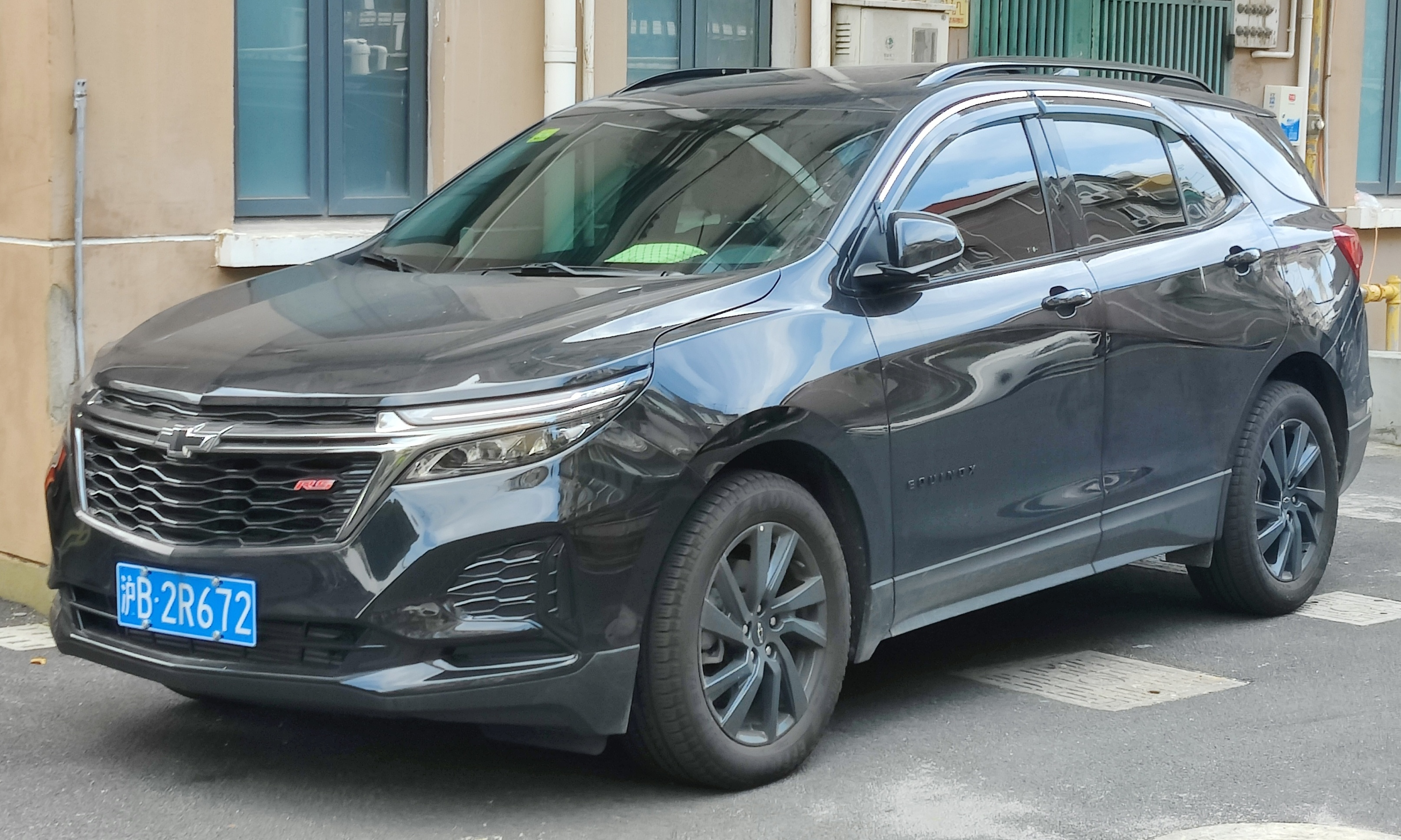
2021 Chevrolet Equinox RS (China)

=== Engines ===
Model year	Type/model	Power	Torque
2018–2022	1.5 L (91 cu in) LYX turbo I4	170 hp (127 kW; 172 PS) at 5,600 rpm	203 lb⋅ft (275 N⋅m; 28 kg⋅m) at 2,000–4,000 rpm
2023–2024	1.5 L (91 cu in) LSD turbo I4	175 hp (130 kW; 177 PS) at 5,600 rpm	203 lb⋅ft (275 N⋅m; 28 kg⋅m) at 2,000–4,000 rpm
2018–2020	2.0 L (122 cu in) LTG turbo I4	252 hp (188 kW; 255 PS) at 5,500 rpm	260 lb⋅ft (353 N⋅m; 36 kg⋅m) at 2,500–4,500 rpm
2018–2019	1.6 L (98 cu in) LH7 turbo-diesel I4	137 hp (102 kW; 139 PS) at 3,750 rpm	240 lb⋅ft (325 N⋅m; 33 kg⋅m) at 2,000 rpm

=== Holden Equinox ===
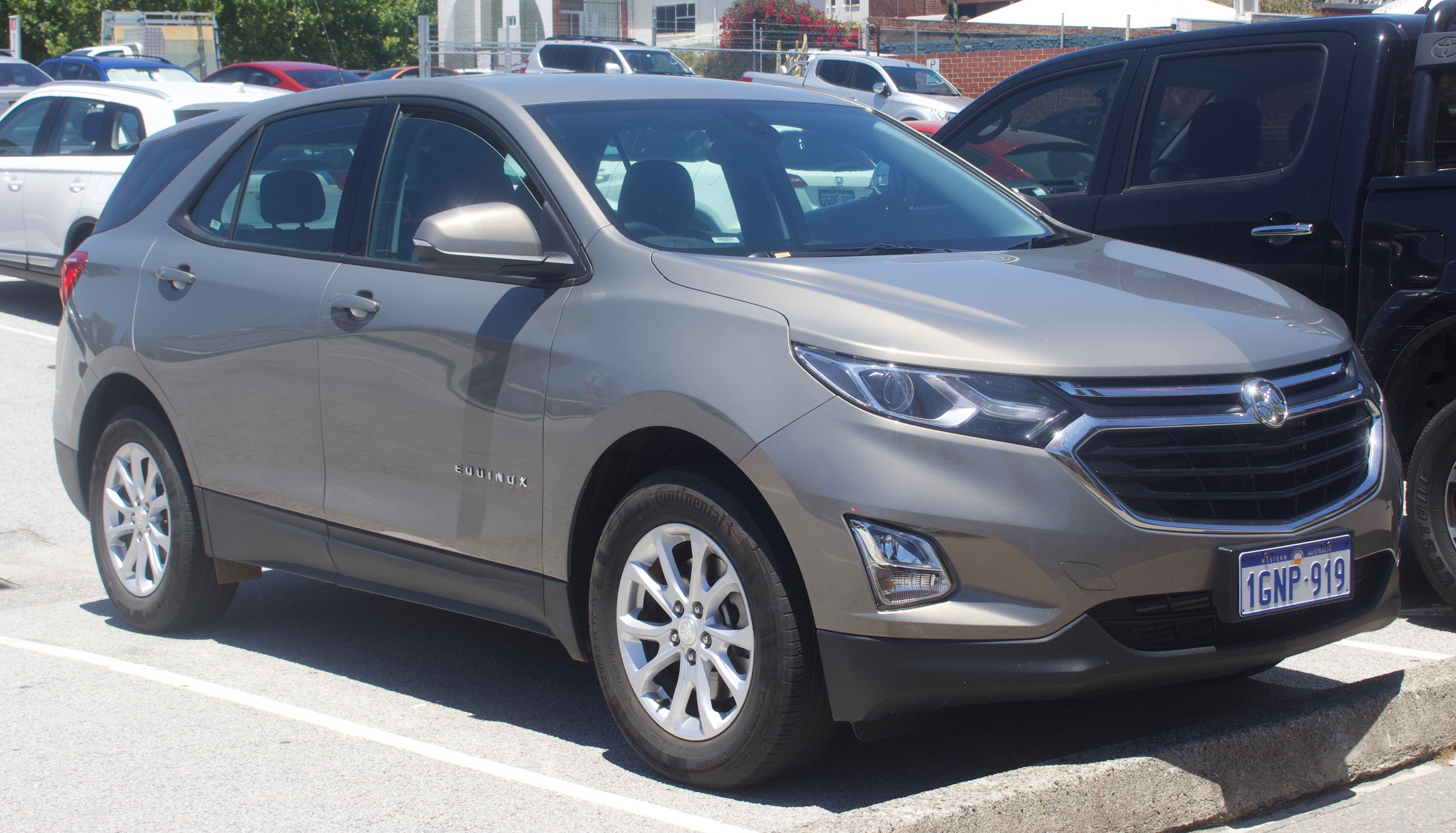
Holden Equinox (Australia and New Zealand) Rear view

Holden launched the Holden Equinox (EQ series) in Australia in November 2017, with the first cars arriving in Australia and New Zealand in December. It was available with a 1.5-liter turbocharged engine on the base LS and LS+ models, while the more potent 2.0-liter turbocharged model was available for all other models – LT, LTZ, and LTZ-V. The 1.6-liter turbo-diesel engine launched in 2018. It was produced at GM's Ramos Arizpe assembly facility in Mexico and replaced the Korean-built five-seat Captiva.

The Australasian Equinox was sold alongside the seven-seat Holden Acadia, known as the GMC Acadia in the Americas.

On October 17, 2018, Holden halted orders on the Equinox because of slow sales and unsold inventory at its dealerships. The Holden Equinox was discontinued in 2020, along with the rest of the Holden lineup, following GM's decision to terminate the marque in Australia and New Zealand and withdraw from all right-hand-drive markets because of poor sales and adequate investments not being returned for demand and funding needed continue to serve and remain present in right-hand-drive markets.

=== Safety ===
IIHS scores (2022)
Small overlap front (Driver)	Good
Small overlap front (Passenger)	Good
Moderate overlap front	Good
Moderate overlap front (updated test)	Poor
Side	Good
Side (updated test)	Marginal
Roof strength	Good
Head restraints and seats	Good
Front crash prevention (Vehicle-to-Vehicle)	Superior
Front crash prevention (Vehicle-to-Pedestrian, day)	Advanced
Child seat anchors (LATCH) ease of use	Acceptable

ANCAP test results* Holden Equinox all variants (2017)
Test	Score
Overall	5 /5 stars
Frontal offset	14.21/16
Side impact	15/16
Pole	2/2
Seat belt reminders	3/3
Whiplash protection	Good
Pedestrian protection	Marginal
Electronic stability control	Standard

== Fourth generation (2025) ==
Fourth generation
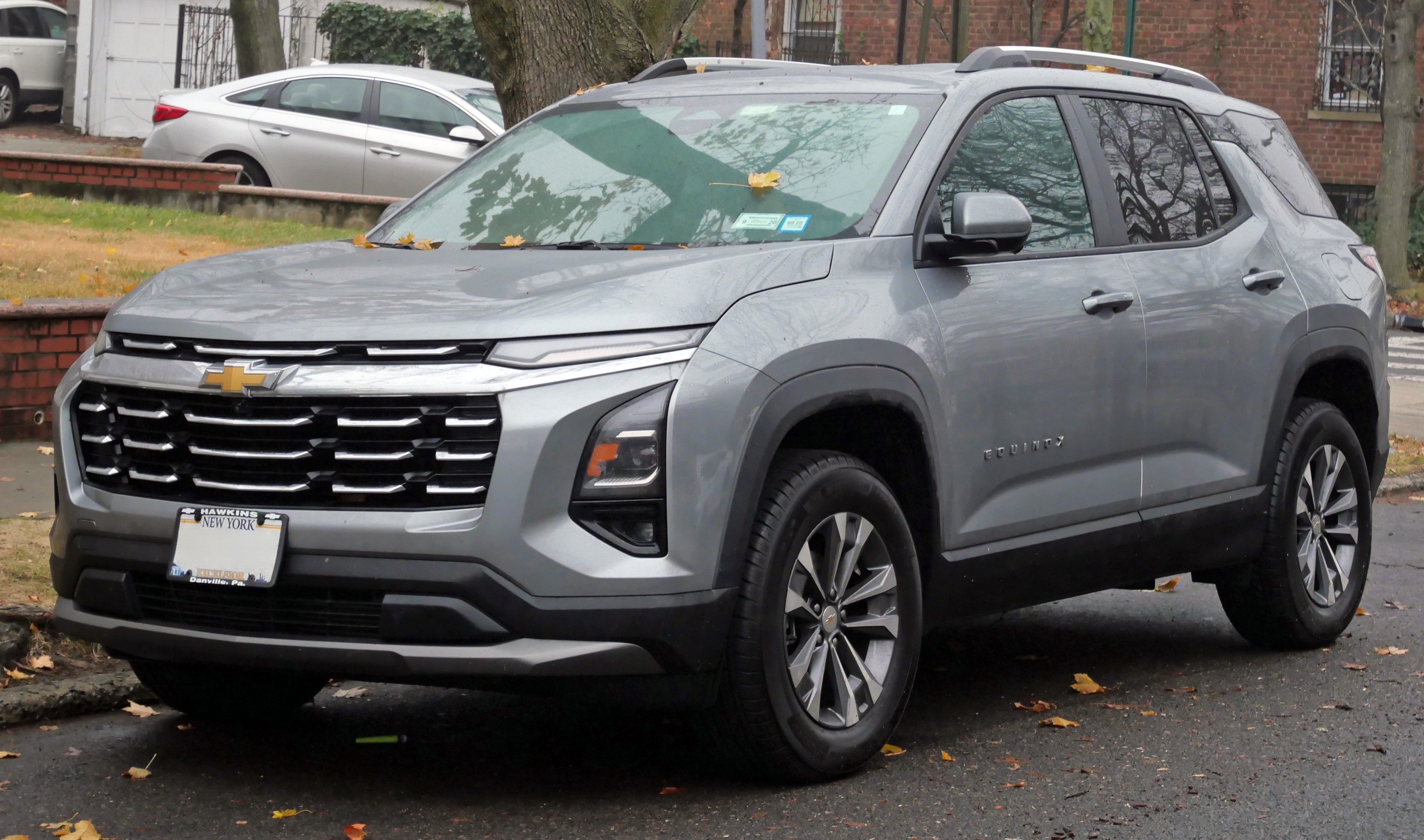
- 2025 Chevrolet Equinox (US)

Overview
- Also called: Chevrolet Equinox Plus (China)
- Production: 2024–present
- Model years: 2025–present
- Assembly: Mexico: San Luis Potosí (San Luis Potosí Assembly); China: Wuhan, Hubei (SAIC-GM); Kazakhstan: Kostanay, Kazakhstan

Body and chassis
- Class: Compact crossover SUV
- Platform: GM VSS-S (D2XX)
- Related: GMC Terrain

Powertrain
- Engine: Gasoline: 1.5 L LSD turbo I4; Gasoline plug-in hybrid: 1.5 L LAX turbo I4
- Transmission: CVT (2025–26 FWD); 8-speed automatic (AWD, and 2027–present FWD); 2-speed DHT (PHEV)
- Battery: 16.5 kWh LFP FinDreams; 24.4 kWh LFP Zenergy
- Electric range: 80–120 km (50–75 mi) (WLTP); 102–155 km (63–96 mi) (CLTC)

Dimensions
- Wheelbase: 107.5 in (2,730 mm)
- Length: 183.2 in (4,653 mm)
- Width: 74.9 in (1,902 mm)
- Height: 65.6 in (1,666 mm); 67.5–68.0 in (1,714–1,728 mm) (PHEV, China)
- Curb weight: 1,860–1,895 kg (4,101–4,178 lb) (PHEV, China)

Chevrolet unveiled the fourth-generation Equinox on January 23, 2024, for the 2025 model year. The model adopts a new electrical architecture and a new platform spun off the existing D2XX platform, called the VSS-S. It also carries over the 1.5-liter turbocharged four-cylinder gasoline engine used by the outgoing Equinox. Trim levels are reduced from four to three, which are LT, RS, and ACTIV, with each trim having its unique front fascia.

The fourth-generation Equinox is built at the San Luis Potosí plant in Mexico (alongside the GMC Terrain) and sales commenced in mid-2024. It is sold alongside the battery-electric powered Equinox EV.

The Equinox shares similar exterior styling from the Traverse, with its front fascia and shark-fin style C-pillar. It features all-LED lighting and for the first time, it is available with 20-inch alloy wheels.

The Activ model features 17-inch machine-finished alloy wheels in all-terrain tires, an available white-colored roof option for a dual-tone exterior color, blacked badging, a unique front fascia with vertical grille inserts and gray metallic accents, a Maple Sugar and Black interior theme, and ACTIV logo stitched on front seat headrests.

The interior has an 11-inch configurable Driver Information Center and an 11.3-inch infotainment touchscreen system (30% larger screen compared to the previous model) that features Google built-in connected services; it has a similar screen layout to the Trax. The gear selector for the automatic transmission is now located on the steering wheel column which allows the drive mode selection dial to be placed in the center console, and the physical headlight controls were omitted to reduce microchip usage.

The 1.5-liter turbocharged inline-four gasoline engine is carried over from its predecessor, with the option of FWD and AWD drivetrains. GM has dropped the 6-speed automatic transmission; instead, the FWD models use a continuously variable transmission (CVT) while the AWD models use an eight-speed automatic transmission. For the first time, the Equinox features drive mode selection on the RS and ACTIV trims; this was expanded to all models for 2026.

For 2027, the CVT was discontinued, and all models now featured the 8-speed automatic transmission.

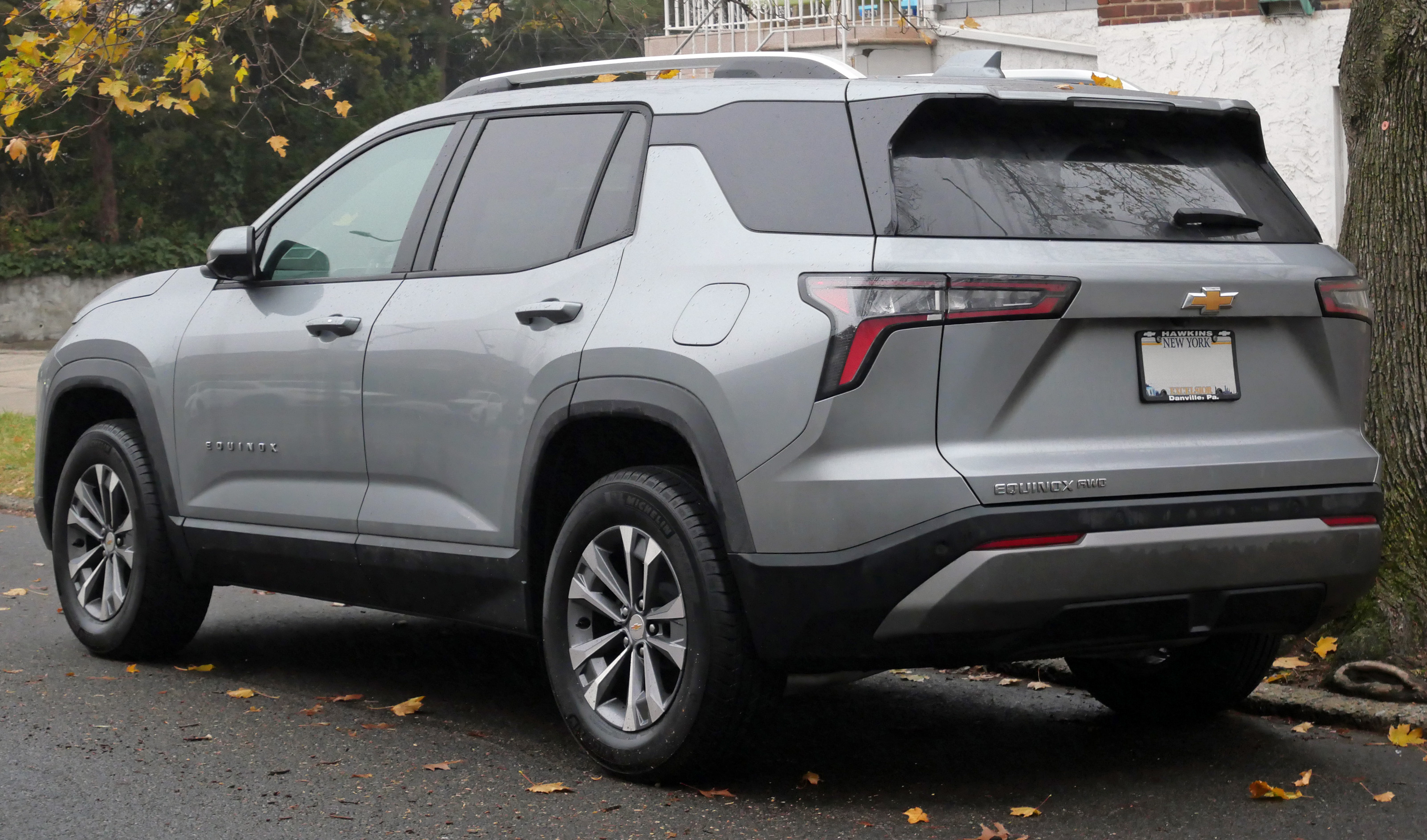
Rear view

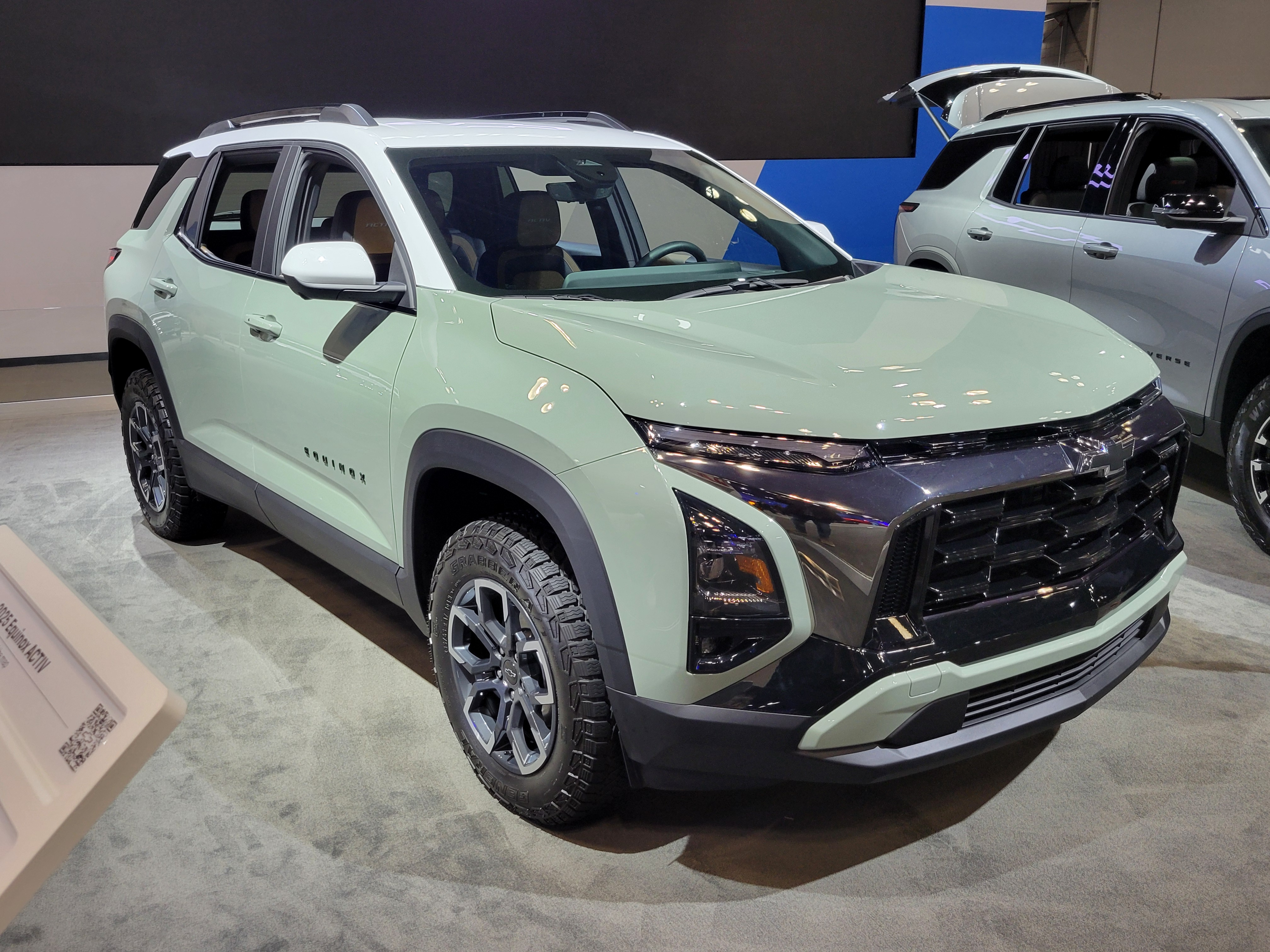
Equinox Activ

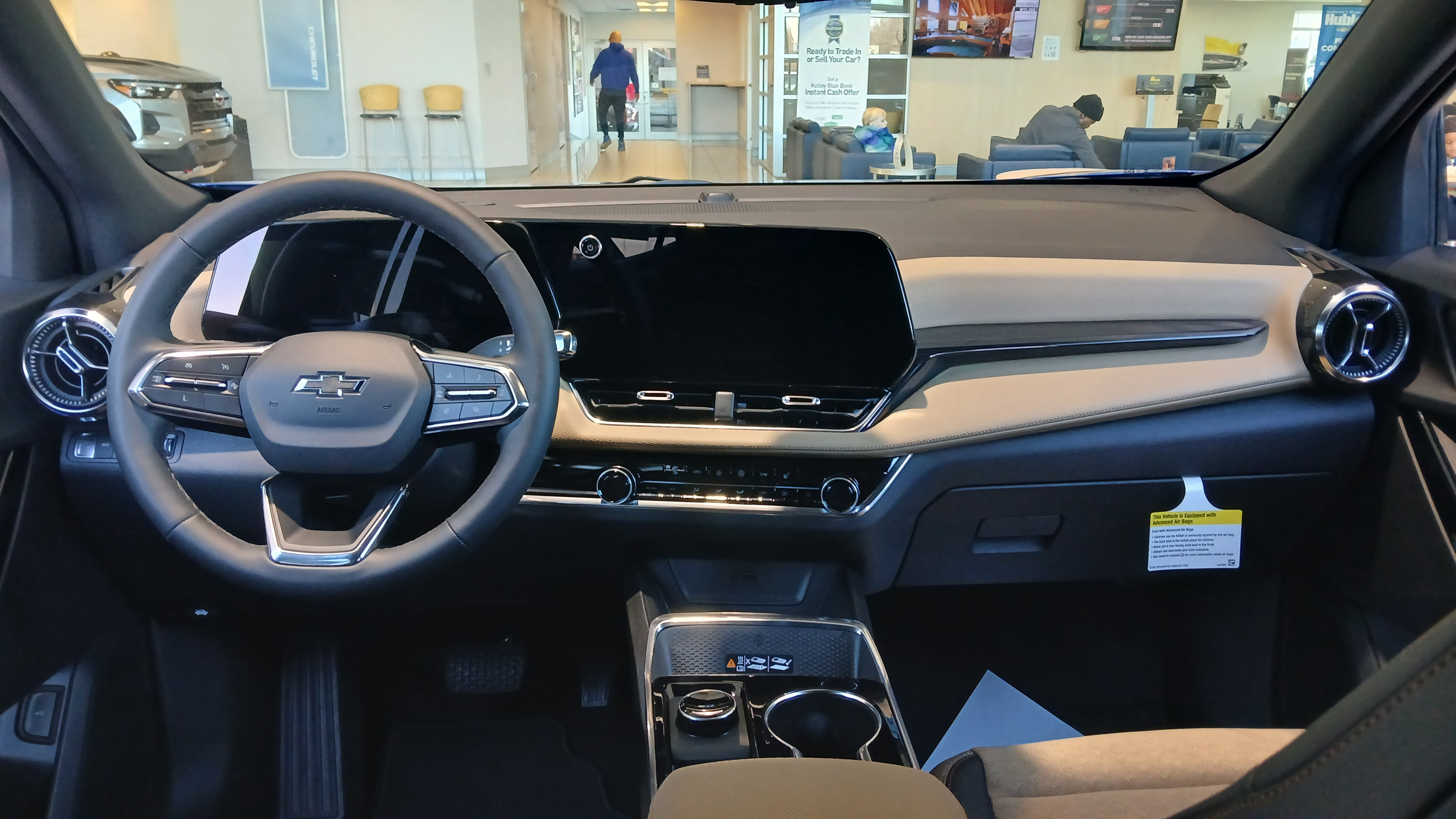
Interior

=== China ===
The fourth-generation Equinox also debuted in March 2024 in China, where it is marketed as the Equinox Plus (Chinese: 探界者PLUS; pinyin: tàn jiè zhě PLUS) to differentiate it from the previous generation (Chinese: 探界者; pinyin: tàn jiè zhě; lit. 'world explorer') which it was sold alongside. It is only available as a plug-in hybrid vehicle, while the previous generation serves as the pure-ICE model. The infotainment system is powered by a Qualcomm Snapdragon 8155 SoC. The Equinox Plus was discontinued in August 2025 with Chevrolet's exit from the Chinese market.

The plug-in hybrid powertrain uses a 1.5-liter turbocharged inline-4 codenamed LAX which outputs 177 hp (132 kW; 179 PS) and 184 lb⋅ft (250 N⋅m) of torque. It is paired to a 2-speed series-parallel DHT (Dedicated Hybrid Transmission) that contains a permanent magnet synchronous motor outputting 188 hp (140 kW; 191 PS) and 232 lb⋅ft (315 N⋅m) of torque. The total system power output is 365 hp (272 kW; 370 PS) and 417 lb⋅ft (565 N⋅m) of torque. Power is supplied by either a 16.5kWh LFP battery supplied by FinDreams or a 24.4kWh LFP pack supplied by Zenergy, which provide pure electric WLTC range ratings of 50 mi (80 km) and 75 mi (120 km), respectively. It has a 0–62 mph (100 km/h) acceleration time of 6.8 seconds and a top speed of 112 mph (180 km/h).

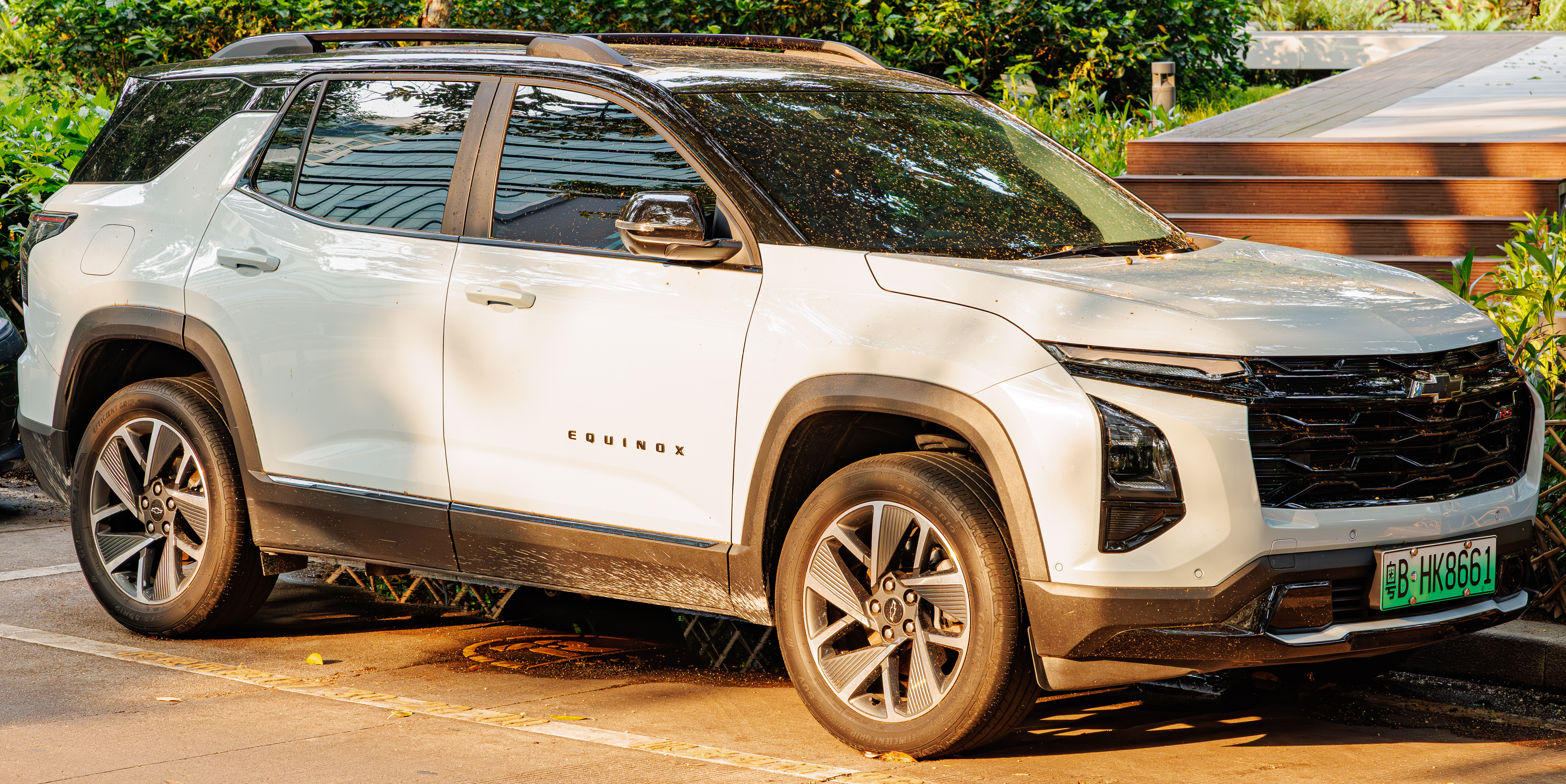
Equinox Plus

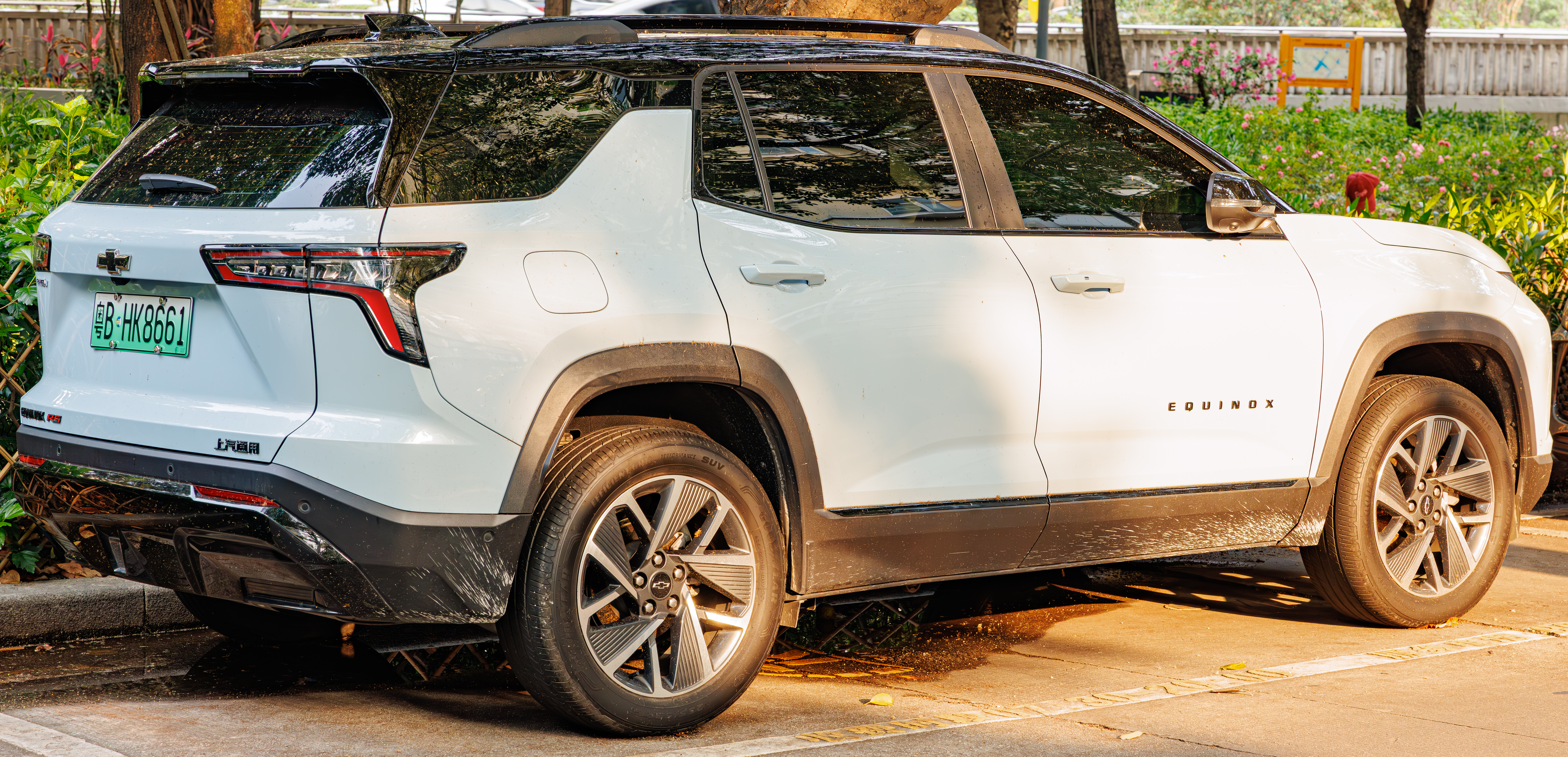
Rear view

== Equinox EV ==
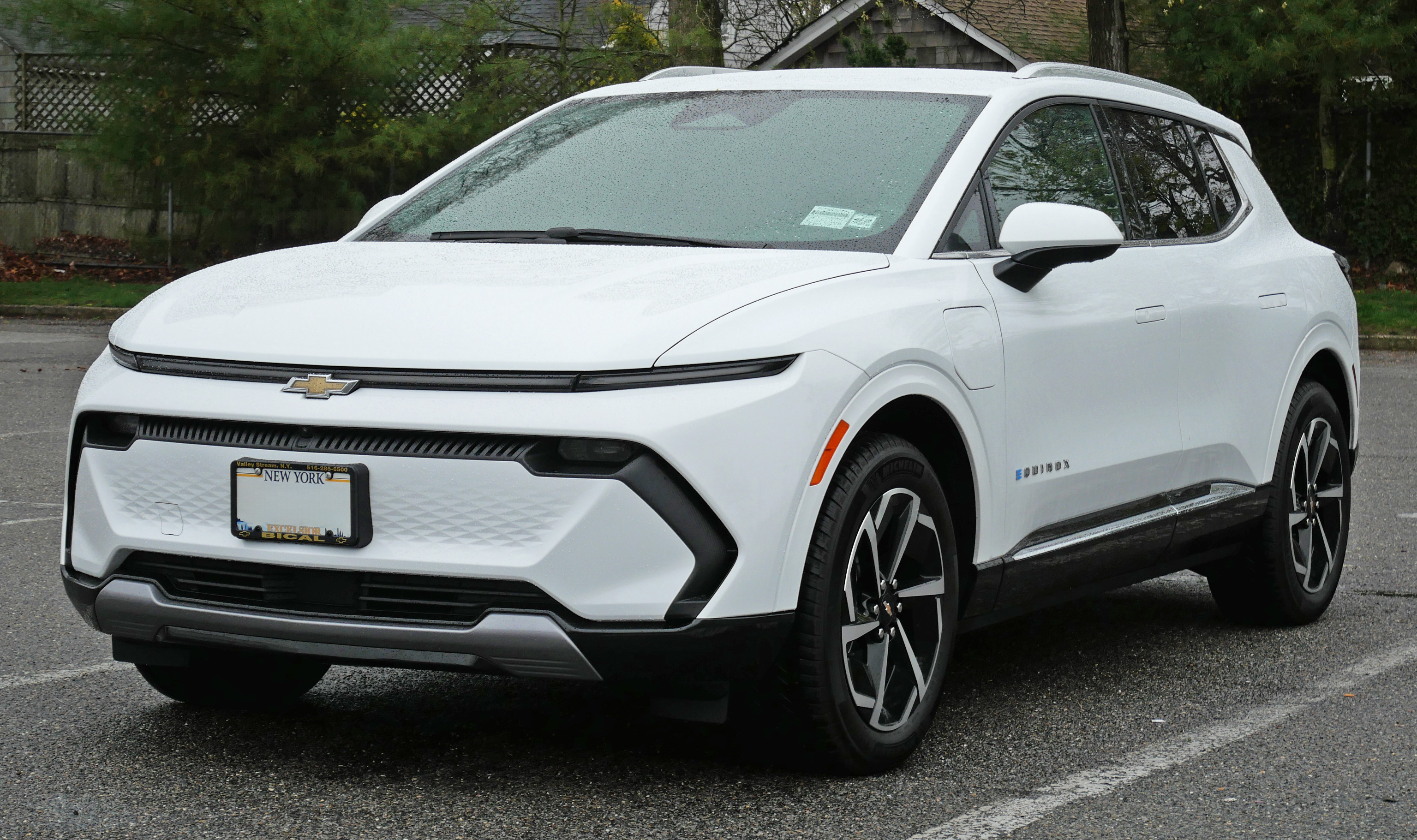
2024 Chevrolet Equinox EV

The battery-electric version of the Equinox was introduced in January 2022 in a set of artist impression images at the 2022 Consumer Electronics Show (CES) and went on sale in 2024 for the 2024 model year. It received a completely separate design and underpinnings to the ICE-powered Equinox. The vehicle is equipped with GM Ultium batteries shared with other GM battery electric vehicles.

== Fuel cell version ==
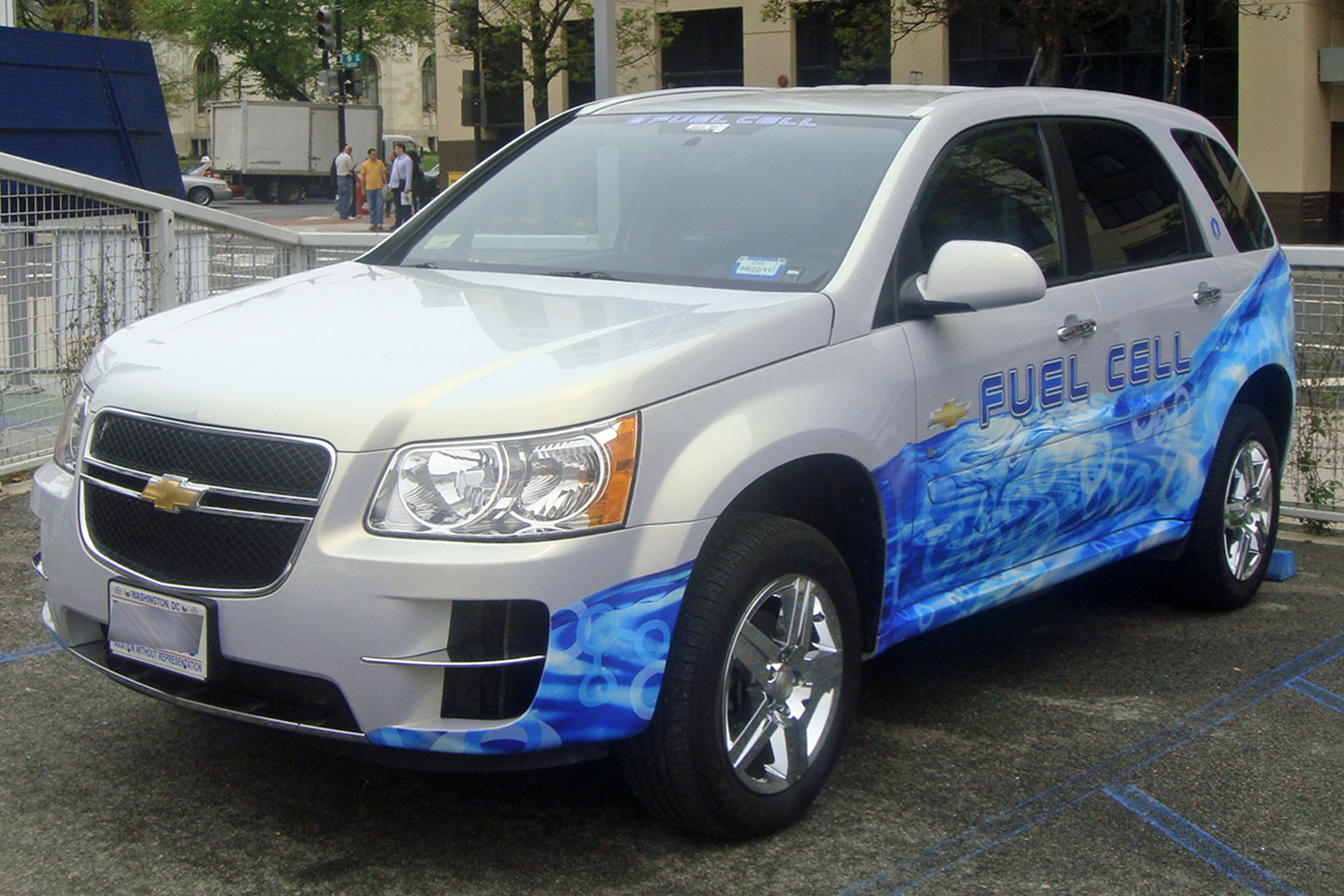
Chevrolet Equinox Fuel Cell with its first generation

The Chevrolet Equinox Fuel Cell Vehicle uses hydrogen for fuel with water as its only exhaust. The Equinox Fuel Cell uses the fourth-generation hydrogen technology found in the Chevrolet Sequel concept, which was unveiled in September 2009. The fuel cell is designed for only 50,000 miles (80,000 km) of driving, but is engineered to be operable in sub-freezing temperatures throughout its life. GM states that the Equinox Fuel Cell is about 500 pounds (230 kg) heavier than the original Equinox and has one inch shorter ground clearance. To reduce weight, it has aluminum doors and a carbon fiber hood. It uses headlights from the Pontiac Torrent.

A dashboard mounted screen calculates the fuel savings to that of a gasoline-powered Equinox. It also includes a kilowatt meter and a fuel cell energy display. The fuel cell has four vapor outlets that replace the exhaust pipe. Three carbon-fiber fuel tanks store up to a maximum of 9.25 pounds (4.2 kg) of gaseous hydrogen at 10,000 psi (70 MPa), and give the Equinox a range of 200 miles (320 km). The Equinox Fuel Cell is certified by the EPA as a zero-emission vehicle (ZEV). GM built 115 Chevrolet Equinox Fuel Cell vehicles and deployed them in 2007–2008 in several target areas including New York and California as part of a comprehensive plan dubbed "Project Driveway".

The Equinox Fuel Cell includes safety features such as ABS, traction control system, and GM's OnStar telematics service, which offers drivers advice on operating the vehicles as well as information on nearby hydrogen filling stations. The vehicle complies with all 2007 federal safety standards.

=== Performance ===
Motor Trend assessed the vehicle's performance as nearly the same as the 3.6-liter gasoline-powered equivalent, while bemoaning the dearth of high-pressure hydrogen filling stations near Riverside, California, in 2008.

== Natural gas version ==
In 2013, Nat G CNG Solutions and AGA Systems announced that it had begun offering a Compressed Natural Gas (CNG) version of the Chevrolet Equinox and the GMC Terrain using the 2.4-liter direct-injected engine. The natural gas version is a "bi-fuel" CNG vehicle, meaning that it can run on either gasoline or natural gas, giving it extended range. The Terrain/Equinox were the first direct-injection natural gas vehicles ever approved by the US EPA.

Silver Eagle Distributors, a distributor of Anheuser-Busch products, was the launch customer for the natural gas version with an initial order of up to 100 of the natural gas GMC Terrains. CenterPoint Energy was an early customer of the natural gas Chevy Equinox.

=== CNG configurations ===
The CNG version was available as a newly purchased Equinox through select dealers or as a retrofit on 2013 and 2014 models. Nat G CNG Solutions offered the vehicle in two options: a two-seater "cargo version" and a five-seat "passenger version." The cargo version has an 837-mile combined gasoline / natural gas (9.2 GGE of CNG) while the passenger version has a 775-mile combined highway range (6.8 GGE of CNG).

=== Emissions and performance ===
The companies claimed that the natural gas version had tested at the EPA lab at 31 mpg_{‑US} (7.6 L/100 km; 37 mpg_{‑imp}) highway on natural gas and had achieved a Bin 3 emissions equivalent to the Toyota Prius.

== Electric conversion ==
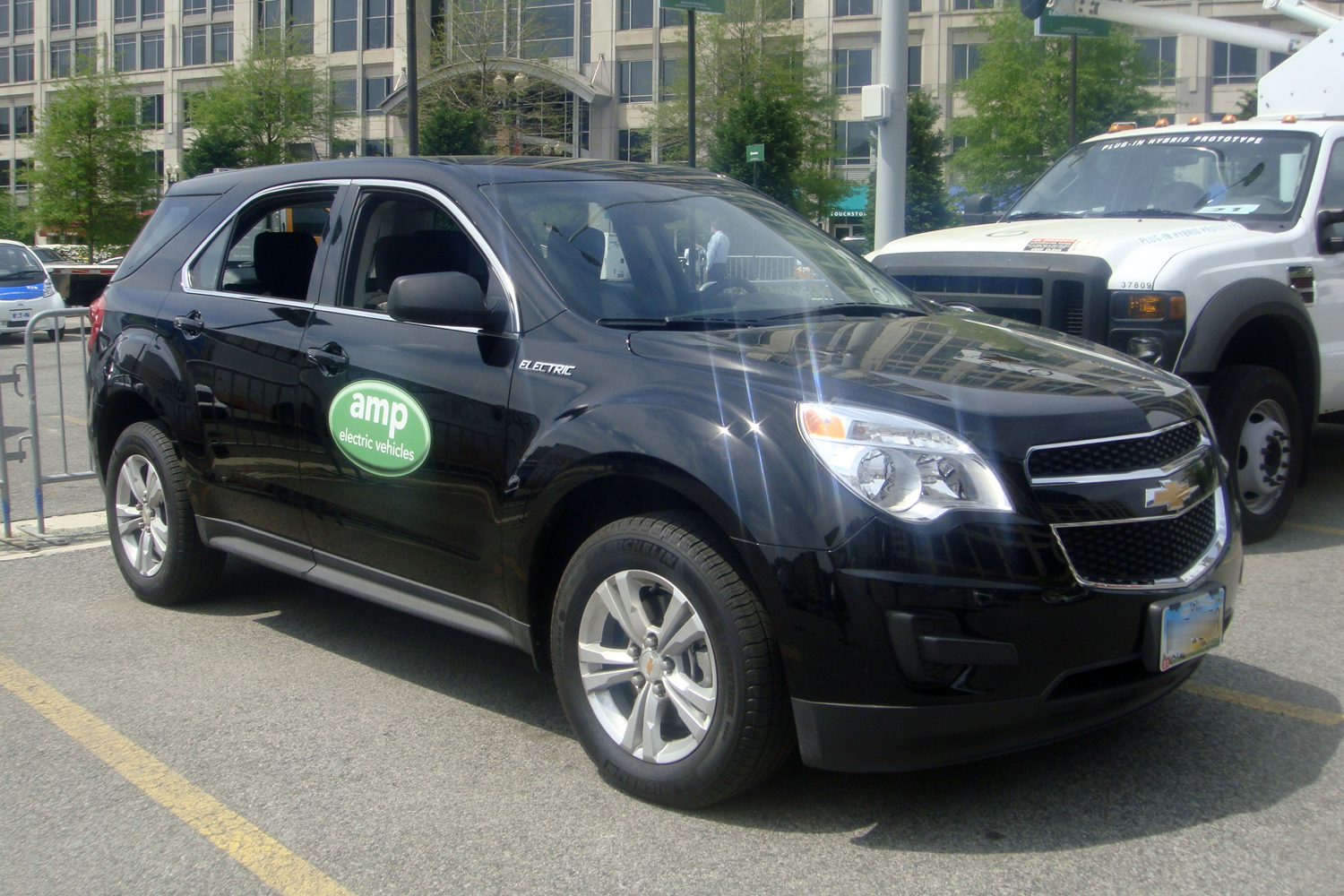
Chevrolet Equinox AMP-converted battery electric vehicle

Amp Electric Vehicles has sold an all-electric conversion of the Chevrolet Equinox. It sold its first converted Equinox to Dayton Power & Light, and had a five-year, thousand-SUV order from Northern Lights Energy in Iceland.

== Sales ==
=== Equinox ===
Calendar year	U.S.	Canada	Mexico	Brazil	China
2004	84,024				
2005	130,542	12,984	8,080		
2006	113,888	15,064	6,086		
2007	89,552	13,205	5,402		
2008	67,447	11,946	1,876		
2009	86,148	11,759			
2010	149,979	19,261			
2011	193,274	22,468			
2012	218,621	20,390			
2013	238,192	19,819			
2014	242,242	19,559			
2015	277,589	19,766	3,376		
2016	242,195	19,197	13,712		
2017	290,458	24,446	7,954	1,214	53,090
2018	332,618	21,338	4,020	5,090	71,497
2019	346,048	18,503	2,427	4,631	50,471
2020	270,994	12,499	1,428	4,812	42,778
2021	165,323	8,675	443	318	43,200
2022	212,072	13,756		1,769	20,357
2023	212,701	13,248		4,068	11,496
2024	207,730	11,510		3,217	3,365
2025	274,356	15,139			852

Equinox Plus
Year	China
2024	1,972
2025	664

=== Pontiac Torrent ===
Calendar year	U.S.
2005	10,303
2006	43,174
2007	32,644
2008	20,625
2009	9,638
2010	68
