= Chevrolet Malibu =

American mid-sized car

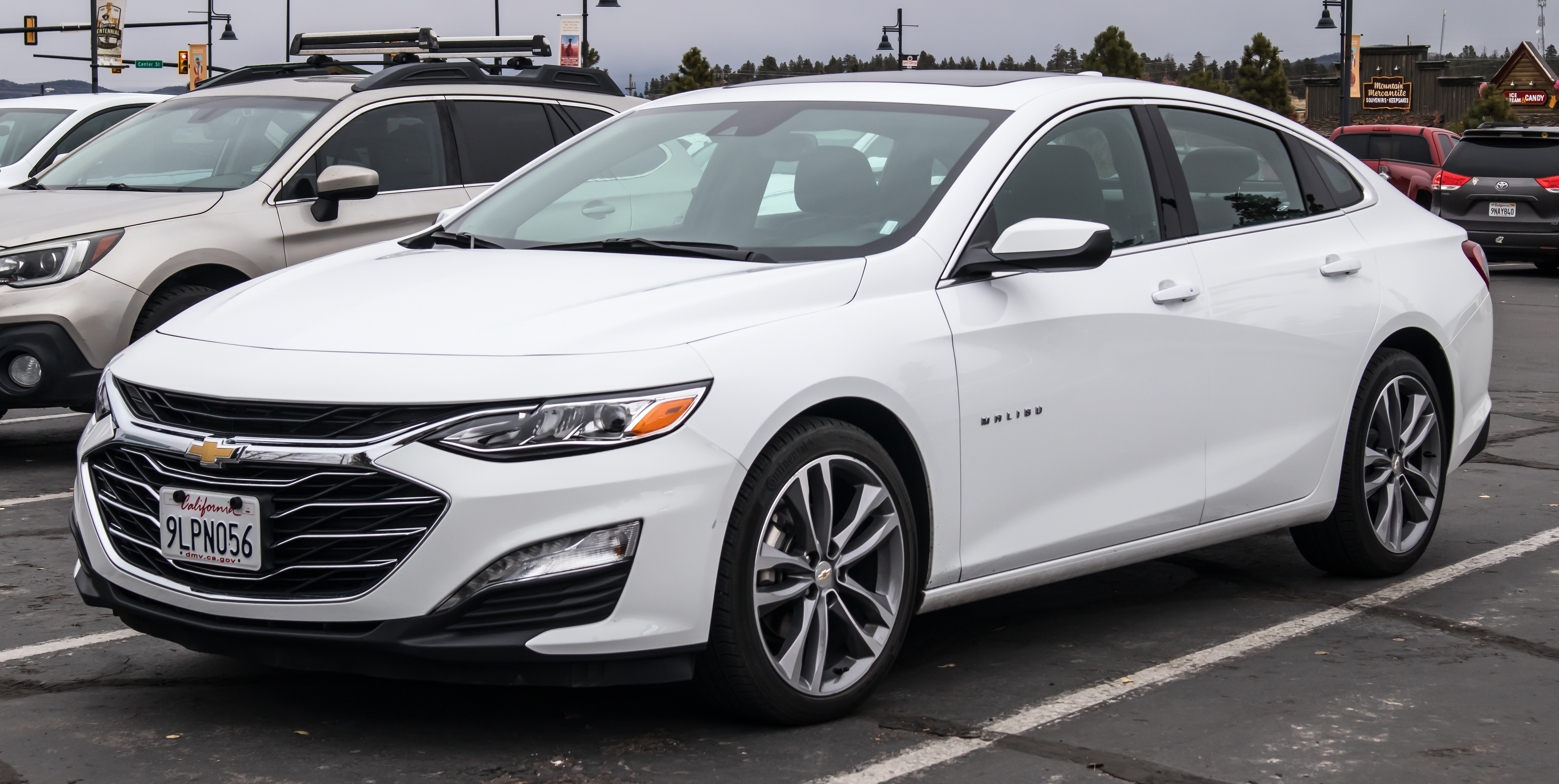
- Ninth-generation Chevrolet Malibu

Overview
- Manufacturer: Chevrolet
- Production: 1964–1983; 1997–2026
- Model years: 1964–1983; 1997–2025

Body and chassis
- Class: Mid-size car
- Layout: Longitudinal front-engine, rear-wheel-drive (1964–1983); Transverse front-engine, front-wheel-drive (1997–2026)

Chronology
- Predecessor: Chevrolet Chevelle (1964); Chevrolet Corsica (1997)
- Successor: Chevrolet Celebrity (1980s)

The Chevrolet Malibu is a mid-size car manufactured and marketed by Chevrolet from 1964 to 1983 and from 1997 to 2026. The Malibu began as a trim-level of the Chevrolet Chevelle before becoming its own model line in 1978. Originally a rear-wheel-drive intermediate, General Motors revived the Malibu nameplate as a front-wheel-drive car in 1997.

Named after the coastal community of Malibu, California, the Malibu was marketed primarily in North America, with the eighth generation introduced globally. Malibu production in the US ended in November 2024, as the Fairfax plant was retooled for the second-generation Chevrolet Bolt, but continued in China until August 2026. The Malibu is now the last sedan to have been sold by Chevrolet in the US.

== First generation (Chevelle Malibu, 1964) ==
First generation
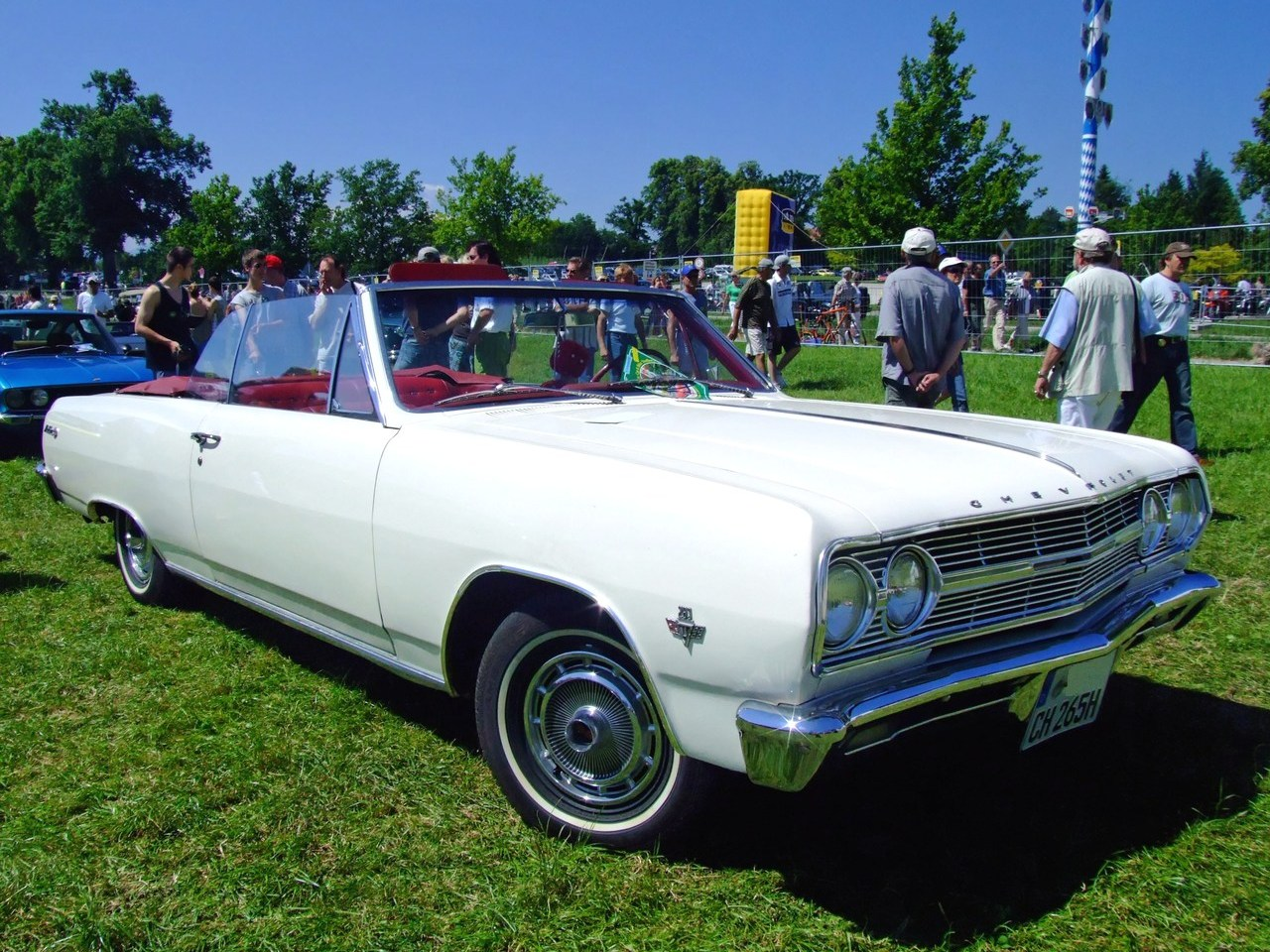
- 1965 Chevrolet Chevelle Malibu SS convertible

Overview
- Model years: 1964–1967

Body and chassis
- Body style: 4-door sedan 2-door hardtop 2-door convertible 5-door Station wagon
- Related: Buick Skylark; Oldsmobile Cutlass Supreme; Pontiac LeMans

The first Malibu was a top-line subseries of the mid-sized Chevrolet Chevelle from 1964 to 1972. Malibus were generally available in a full range of body styles including a four-door sedan, two-door Sport Coupe hardtop, convertible and two-seat station wagon. Interiors were more lavish than lesser Chevelle 300 and 300 Deluxe models thanks to patterned cloth and vinyl upholstery (all-vinyl in convertibles and station wagons), deep-twist carpeting, deluxe steering wheel and other items. The Malibu SS performance package was available only as a two-door Sport Coupe hardtop or convertible and added bucket seats, center console (with optional four-speed manual or Powerglide transmissions), engine gauges and special wheel covers, and offered with any six-cylinder or V8 engine offered in other Chevelles - with the top option being a 300 hp (224 kW; 304 PS) 327 cu in (5.4 L) in 1964.

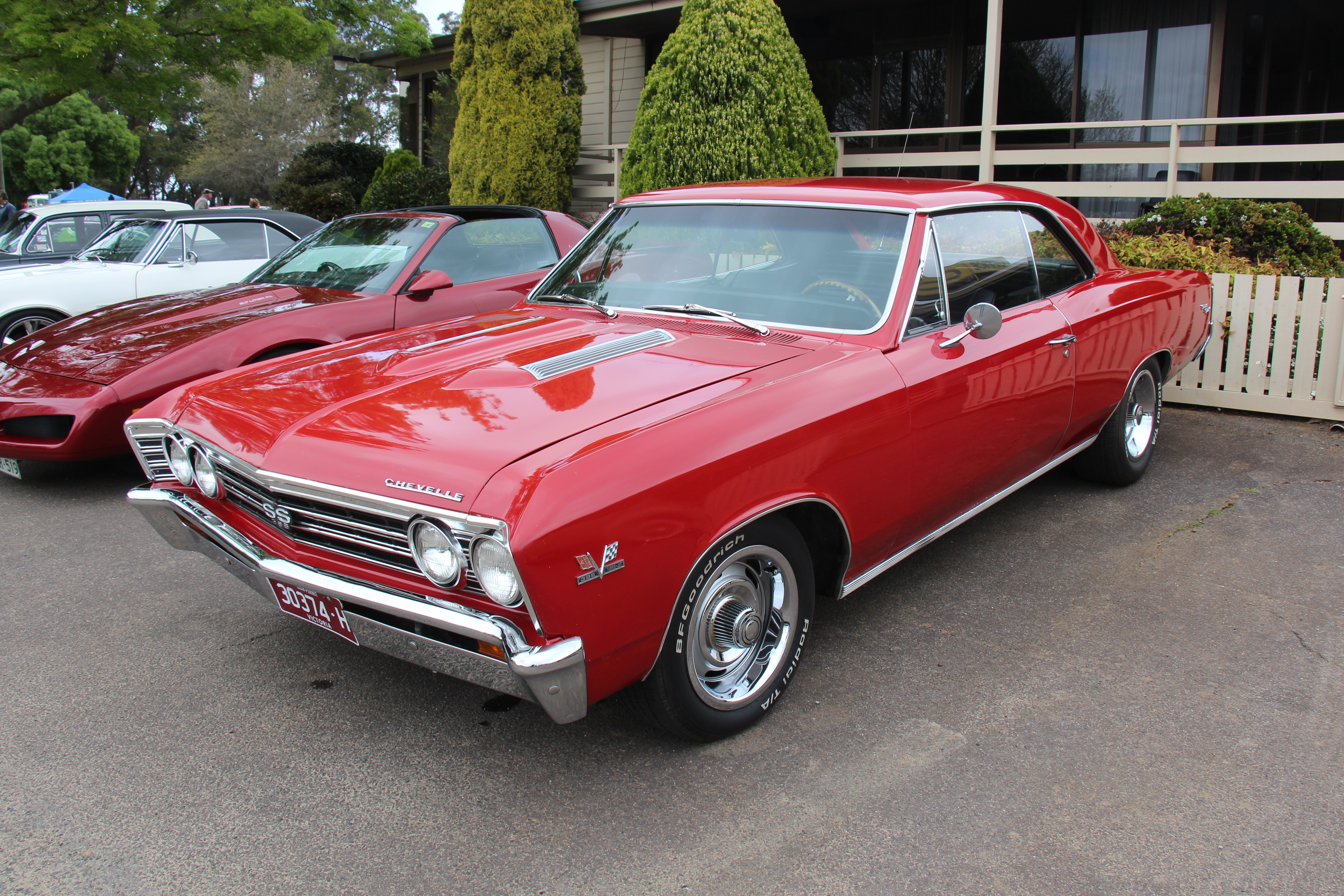
A red 1967 Chevrolet Malibu

For 1965, Malibus and other Chevelles received new grilles and revised tail sections and had the exhaust pipes replaced, but carried over the same basic styling and body styles from 1964. The Malibu and Malibu SS models continued as before, with the SS featuring a blacked out grille and special wheel covers. The top engine option was now a 350 hp (261 kW; 355 PS) 327 cu in (5.4 L) V8. 201 of the 1965 Malibu SS cars got Regular Production Option (RPO) Z16, which include a heavily modified chassis and Chevy's new 375 horsepower 396 cubic inch V8. All were hardtops, although rumors persist that one convertible was built.

The Malibu SS was replaced in 1966 by a new Chevelle SS-396 series that included a big-block 396 cu in (6.5 L) V8 engine (the Canadian market did not receive the SS396, but marketed the former Malibu SS nameplate until it was phased out in January 1967), heavy duty suspension and other performance equipment. Other SS-396 equipment was similar to Malibu Sport Coupes and convertibles, including an all-vinyl bench seat. Bucket seats and console with floor shift were now optional on the SS. For 1966, with the SS now denoting a car with a big-block engine, the bucket seats became a new option on the regular Malibu Sport Coupe and convertible, upon which any six-cylinder or small-block V8 could be ordered. Also new for 1966 was the Chevelle Malibu four-door Sport Sedan hardtop. Styling revisions on all 1966 Chevelles included more rounded styling similar to the full-sized Chevrolets with sail panels and tunneled rear windows featured on two-door hardtop coupes.

For 1967, the same assortment of body styles were continued with styling changes similar to all other Chevelles, including a new grille and revised tail section with taillights that wrapped around to the side. New this year was a Chevelle Malibu Concours station wagon with simulated woodgrain exterior side panel trim. Front disc brakes were a new option, along with a stereo 8-track tape player. The same assortment of drivetrains carried over from 1966 with the top 327 cu in (5.4 L) V8 dropped from 350 to 325 hp (261 to 242 kW; 355 to 330 PS).

== Second generation (Chevelle Malibu, 1968) ==
Second generation
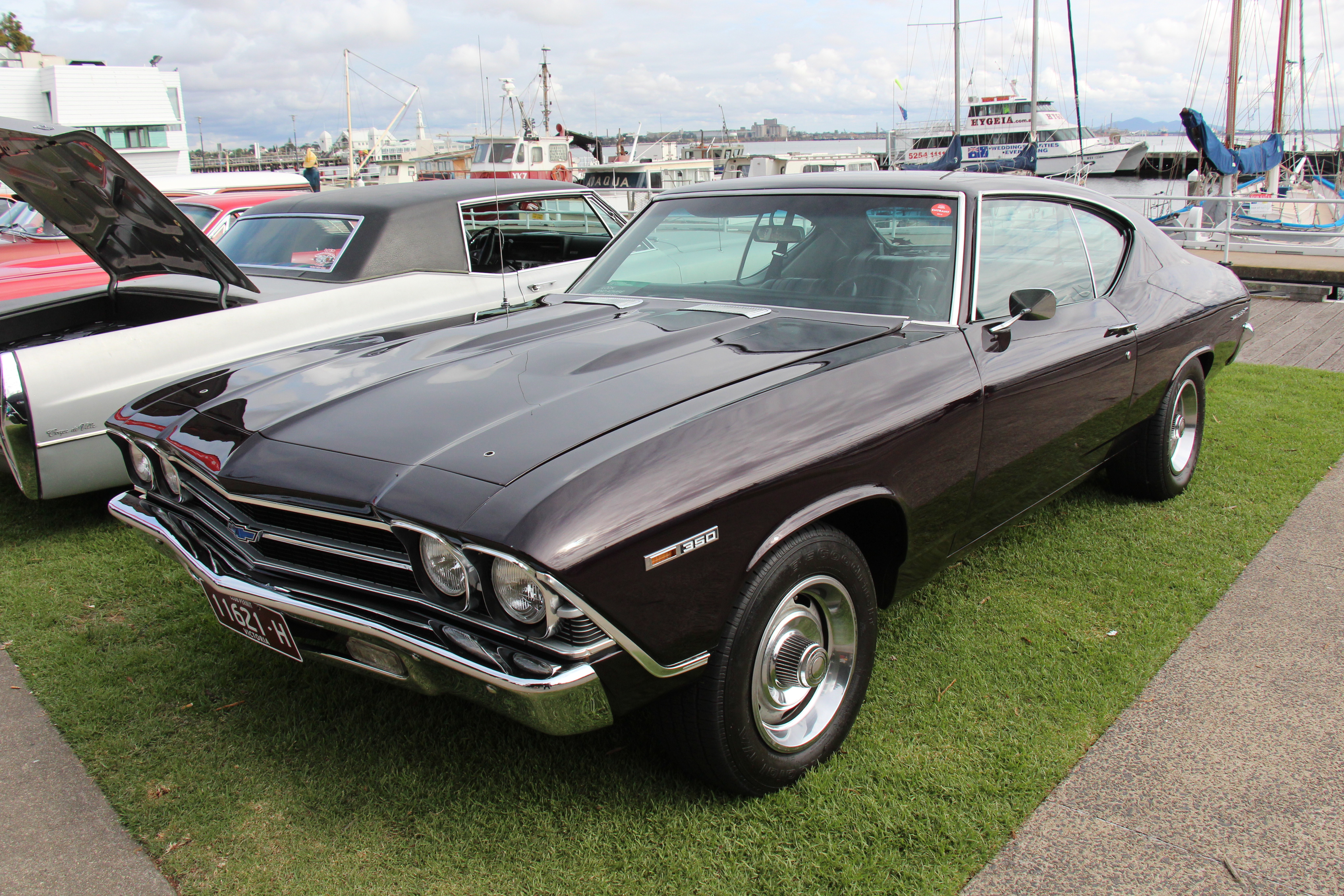
- 1969 Chevrolet Chevelle Malibu Sports Roof

Overview
- Also called: Chevrolet Chevelle
- Model years: 1968–1972

Body and chassis
- Body style: 4-door sedan 2-door hardtop 2-door convertible
- Layout: Front-engine, rear-wheel-drive
- Platform: A platform (RWD)
- Related: Buick Century; Buick Regal; Chevrolet El Camino; Chevrolet Monte Carlo; Oldsmobile Cutlass; Oldsmobile Cutlass 442; Pontiac Grand Am; Pontiac Grand Prix; Pontiac LeMans

Malibus and all other Chevelles were completely restyled for 1968, with semi-fastback rooflines on two-door hardtops and wheelbases split to 112 inches (2,800 mm) on two-door models and 116 inches (2,900 mm) for four-door sedans and station wagons. Engine offerings included a new 307 cu in (5.0 L) V8 rated at 200 hp (149 kW; 203 PS) that replaced the 283 cu in (4.6 L) V8 that had served as the base V8 since the Chevelle's introduction in 1964. Inside was a new instrument panel featuring round gauges in square pods, similar to what would appear in Camaros the following year. New for 1968 was the Concours luxury option for Malibu sedans and coupes that included upgraded cloth or vinyl bench seats, carpeted lower door panels, woodgrain trim on dash and door panels, a center console and floor shifter (only with the hardtop and convertible, which was shared with the SS396) and Concours nameplates. There was again a top-line Concours Estate wagon with simulated woodgrain trim that had the same interior and exterior appointments as the Malibu sedans.

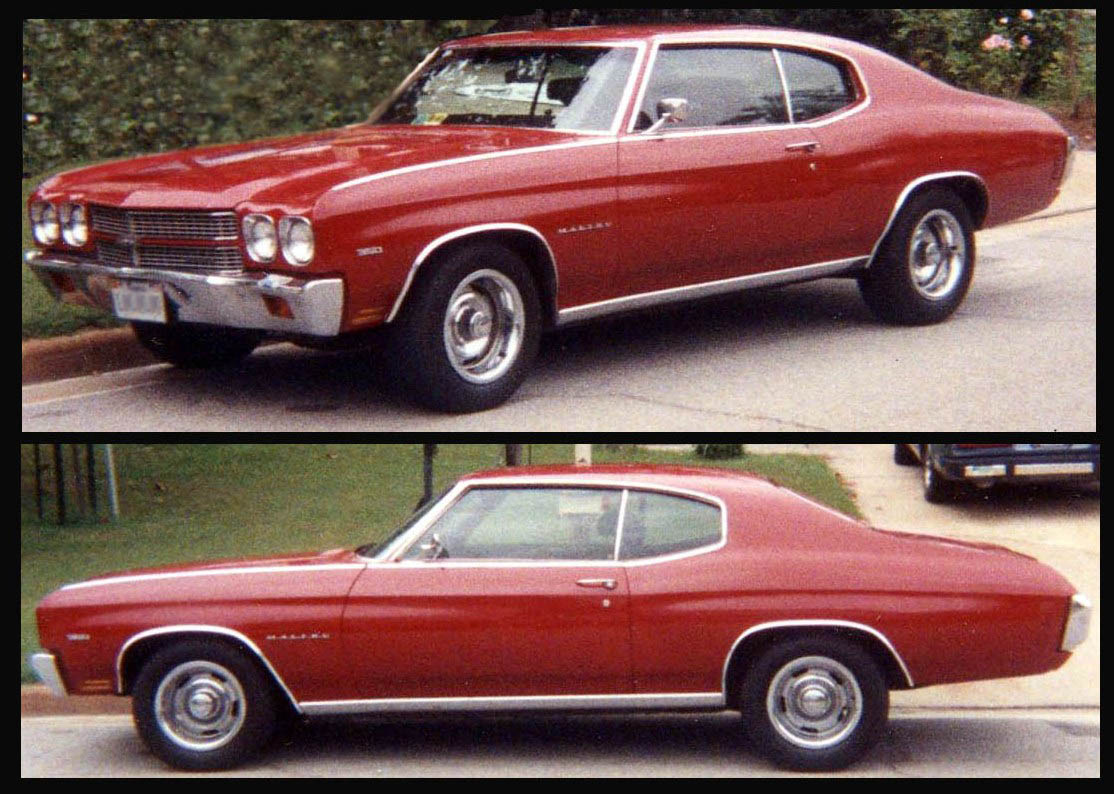
1970 Chevelle Malibu 2-door sport coupe

New grilles and rear decks with revised taillights highlighted the 1969 Malibus and other Chevelles. Instrument panels were revised and front seat headrests were standard equipment due to a federal safety mandate. The ignition switch moved from the instrument panel to the steering column, and also doubled as a steering wheel lock. The 307 continued as the base V8, but the 327 engines were replaced by new 350 cu in (5.7 L) V8s of 255 and 300 hp (190 and 224 kW; 259 and 304 PS). GM's three-speed Turbo Hydra-Matic transmission, previously only offered on SS-396 Chevelles (RPO M40), was now available on all models with all engines (THM400s were used with the 396 while the THM350 (RPO M38) first introduced with the Camaro and Nova) was phased in with the small blocks optioned, including the six-cylinder and small-block V8s which in previous years were only available with the two-speed Powerglide. A police package Chevelle 300 (pillared 4-door sedan) was available for the 1969 model year which came with the L35 code 396; it was built in few numbers when Chrysler held the market for its law enforcement orders. Some 1964 and 1965 Chevelle 300s came with the BO7 police package but was powered with the inline six.

For 1970, the Malibu was initially the only series of Chevelle offered, aside from the SS-396 and new SS-454, as the low-line 300 and 300 Deluxe models were discontinued for the American market (it continued in Canada until 1972), which also eliminated the two-door pillared coupes from the Chevelle lineup (which were never included in the Malibu series). New grilles, rear decks with taillights moved into the bumper, and a revised Sport Coupe roofline highlighted this year's changes. The standard six-cylinder engine was punched up from 230 cu in (3.8 L) to 250 cu in (4.1 L) and 155 hp (116 kW; 157 PS), while the same assortment of V8s carried over with the addition of a 330 hp (246 kW; 335 PS), 400 cu in (6.6 L) V8 on non-SS Chevelles. In the middle of the 1970 model year, the Malibu was rejoined by lower-line Chevelle models that were simply called the base Chevelle in both four-door sedans and two-door hardtops.

For 1971, Malibus and all other Chevelles received a new grille surrounded by single headlamps, replacing the dual headlamps of previous years, and four round taillights, similar to those on Camaros and Corvettes, were located in the bumper. All engines were detuned to use lower-octane unleaded gasoline that year, per GM corporate policy, as a first step toward the catalytic converter–equipped cars planned for 1975 and later models, which would require unleaded fuel.

Only new grilles highlighted the 1972 Malibu and other Chevelles. All body styles were carried over from 1971, but 1972 would be the final year for hardtops and convertibles, as the redesigned Chevelles originally planned for this year (but delayed until 1973) would feature Colonnade styling with side pillars and frameless door windows. The 1972 Chevelle could also be ordered with the police package (RPO code 9C1, which would later become the default RPO code for subsequent Chevrolet PPV packages).

== Third generation (Chevelle Malibu, 1973) ==
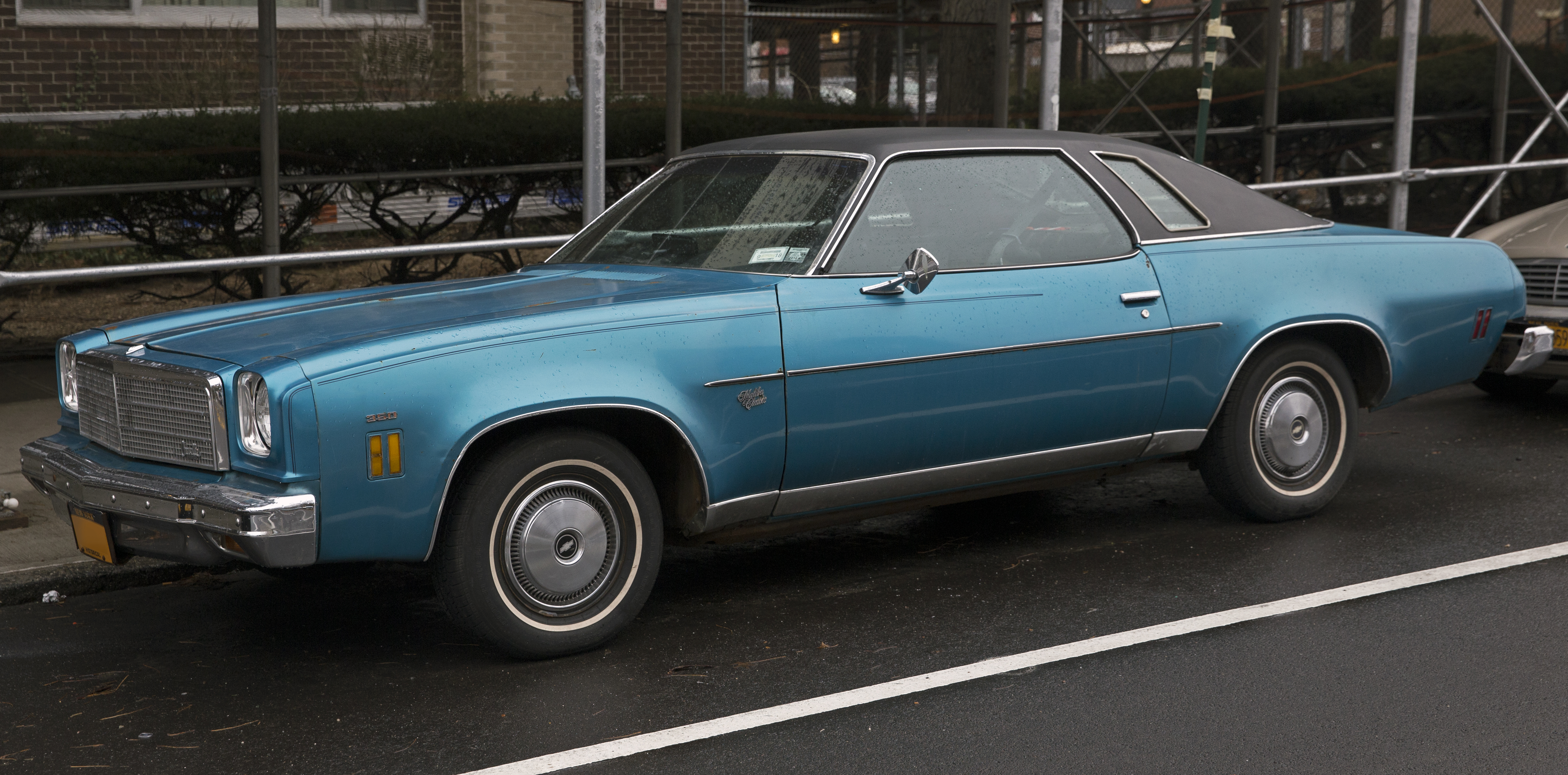
1974 Chevrolet Chevelle Malibu Classic hardtop

The Chevelle was redesigned for the 1973 model year. Models included the base Deluxe, mid-range Malibu and Malibu SS, and the top-line Laguna.

For 1974, the Deluxe was dropped, and the Malibu became the entry-level Chevelle. The Laguna trim package was replaced with the Malibu Classic which used a stacked arrangement of four rectangular headlights and made its way to the dealers in the 1976 model year, offering the Chevrolet-built 250-cubic-inch inline-six as the base engine. The Laguna S-3 model was introduced to replace the SS, and continued through 1976.

== Fourth generation (1978) ==
Fourth generation
- 1978 Malibu Classic

Overview
- Production: 1978–1983
- Assembly: Arlington, Texas, U.S. (Arlington Assembly); Baltimore, Maryland, U.S. (Baltimore Assembly); Doraville, Georgia, U.S. (Doraville Assembly); Fremont, California, U.S. (Fremont Assembly); Leeds, Missouri, U.S. (Leeds Assembly); Oshawa, Ontario, Canada (Oshawa Car Assembly); Ramos Arizpe, Coahuila, Mexico (Ramos Arizpe Assembly); Valencia, Carabobo, Venezuela

Body and chassis
- Body style: 2-door coupe 4-door sedan 5-door station wagon
- Layout: Front-engine, rear-wheel-drive
- Platform: A-body (1978–1981); G-body (1982–1983)
- Related: Buick Century; Buick Regal; Chevrolet Monte Carlo; Oldsmobile Cutlass; Pontiac LeMans; Pontiac Bonneville

Powertrain
- Engine: 200 cu in (3.3 L) Chevrolet L26 V6; 229 cu in (3.8 L) Chevrolet V6; 231 cu in (3.8 L) Buick LD5 V6; 305 cu in (5.0 L) Chevrolet LG3 V8; 350 cu in (5.7 L) Chevrolet LM1 V8
- Transmission: 3-speed manual; 4-speed manual; 3-speed automatic

Dimensions
- Wheelbase: 108 in (2,743 mm)
- Length: 192.7 in (4,895 mm) (sedan & coupe); 193.4 in (4,912 mm) (wagon)
- Width: 71.5 in (1,816 mm) (sedan & coupe); 71.2 in (1,808 mm) (wagon)
- Height: 53.3 in (1,354 mm) (sedan); 54.5 in (1,384 mm) (wagon)

Chronology
- Successor: Chevrolet Celebrity

For the 1978 model year, the Malibu name, which had been the best-selling badge in the lineup, replaced the Chevelle name. This was Chevrolet's second downsized nameplate, following the 1977 Caprice and Impala. The new, more efficient platform was over a foot shorter and had shed 500 to 1,000 pounds (230 to 450 kg) compared to previous versions, yet offered increased trunk space, leg room, and head room. Only two trim levels were offered: Malibu and Malibu Classic. The Malibu Classic Landau series had a two-tone paint job on the upper and lower body sections, and a vinyl top. This generation introduced the Chevrolet 90° V6 family of engines, with a 200 cu in (3.3 L) V6 as the base engine. A 305 cu in (5.0 L) Chevrolet V8 was the sole engine upgrade on coupes and sedans; on station wagons, a 350 cu in (5.7 L) Chevrolet V8 was also available. In California, a 231 cu in (3.8 L) Buick V6 was the standard engine, with the Chevrolet 305 the only other option.

Three body styles were produced (station wagon, sedan, and coupe), and the design was also used as the basis for the El Camino pickup truck with its own chassis. The sedan initially had a conservative six-window notchback roofline. This was in contrast to the unusual fastback rooflines adopted by Oldsmobile and Buick, which would later revert to a more formal pillar style. To increase rear seat hip room (and encourage more orders for the high-profit air conditioner), the windows in the rear doors of four-door sedans were fixed, while the wagons had small moveable vents. With the rear window regulators no longer required, Chevrolet was able to recess the door arm rests into the door cavity, resulting in a few extra inches of rear seat room. Customers complained about the lack of rear seat ventilation. This design undoubtedly contributed to the number of factory air-conditioning units sold with the cars, to the benefit of General Motors and Chevrolet dealers. For the 1981 model year, sedans adopted a four-window profile and "formal" pillared upright roof line. The two-door coupe was last produced in this year, as the Monte Carlo assumed the market position held by the 2-door coupe. For 1982, the Malibu was facelifted with more squared-off front styling marked by quad headlights with long, thin turn signals beneath them. The look was reminiscent of the also recently facelifted Caprice. For 1983, Malibus gained a block-style "Malibu" badge on the front fenders to replace the cursive-style script located on the rear quarter panels of previous model years.

The four-door Malibu was commonly used in fleet service, especially for law enforcement. After the Chevrolet Nova ceased production in 1979, the mid-sized 9C1 police version (not to be confused with the full-size Impala 9C1, which was also available) was transferred to the Malibu, filling a void for the mid-sized police patrol cars. A 9C1-equipped Malibu with an LT-1 Z-28 Camaro engine driven by E. Pierce Marshall placed 13th in the 1979 Cannonball Baker Sea-To-Shining-Sea Memorial Trophy Dash, better known as the Cannonball Run.

There was no factory Malibu SS option available on this generation, as the SS only came in the El Camino. The rare, striking 1980 Malibu M80 was a dealer package for only North and South Carolina, and was mostly aimed at NASCAR fans who regularly traveled to Darlington Raceway. To this day, the number actually produced is unknown; estimates place this at around 1,901 cars. All M80s had to be white with dark blue bucket seats and center console interior. The base of the M80 was a two-door sport coupe equipped with the F41 Sport Suspension package and the normal V8 (140 hp) drivetrain. The M80 option added two dark-blue skunk stripes on top and a lower door stripe with the M80 identification. The package also added front and rear spoilers and 1981 steel rally wheels (sourced from the 1980 Monte Carlo).

In Mexico, General Motors produced this generation at the Ramos Arizpe plant and sold it in the region from 1979 to 1981. Mexican versions came in three trim levels (Chevelle, Malibu, and Malibu Classic) and two body styles (sedan and coupe), with the 250 cu in (4.1 L) I6 as basic engine and the 350 cu in (5.7 L) 260 hp (194 kW) V8 as the optional; this engine was standard on Malibu Classic models during those three years. This was possible because Mexican emissions regulations remained relatively loose at the time.

=== Iraqi taxi ===
In 1981, General Motors of Canada (GMCL) produced a special order of 25,500 four-door Malibu sedans at their Oshawa plant for Saddam Hussein's Iraqi government. The deal was reportedly worth $100 million to GMCL. These special-order Malibus carried the unusual combination of GM's lowest-power carbureted V6 engine, the 110 hp (82 kW) 229 cu in (3.8 L) unit and a three-speed manual transmission with floor shifter; air conditioning, heavy-duty cooling system, AM/FM cassette deck, front bench seat, 200 km/h speedometer, tough tweed and vinyl upholstery, and 14-inch body-color steel wheels with small hubcaps.

Only 13,000 of these cars made it to Iraq, with the majority becoming taxis in Baghdad. The Iraqi government suddenly cancelled the order in 1982. The proffered excuse for the cancellation was dissatisfaction with the cars' quality, notably difficult shifting of the transmission, which GM traced to a clutch release issue that eventually required on-site retrofitting by a crew of Canadian technicians sent to Iraq. Later speculation was that the Iraqis backed out for financial reasons, due to their escalating hostilities with Iran requiring the immediate diversion of funds to support the Iraqi war effort. GMCL President Donald Hackworth was initially quoted as stating the company would try to sell the Malibus in other Middle East markets, but ultimately the orphaned cars were all sold to the Canadian public at a greatly reduced price of about CA$6,800. Over the years, they have acquired a low-key celebrity status, sometimes being colloquially referred to as "Iraqibu".

=== NASCAR ===
The previous Malibu was an extensively used body style in NASCAR competition. When the downsized Malibu body style became eligible to run in 1981 due to its boxy shape, it was only raced by one driver, Dave Marcis. Marcis ran a Malibu in 1981 and 1982, with one victory in a rain-shortened Richmond 400 at Richmond International Raceway in 1982, the independent driver's last win.

=== Gallery ===
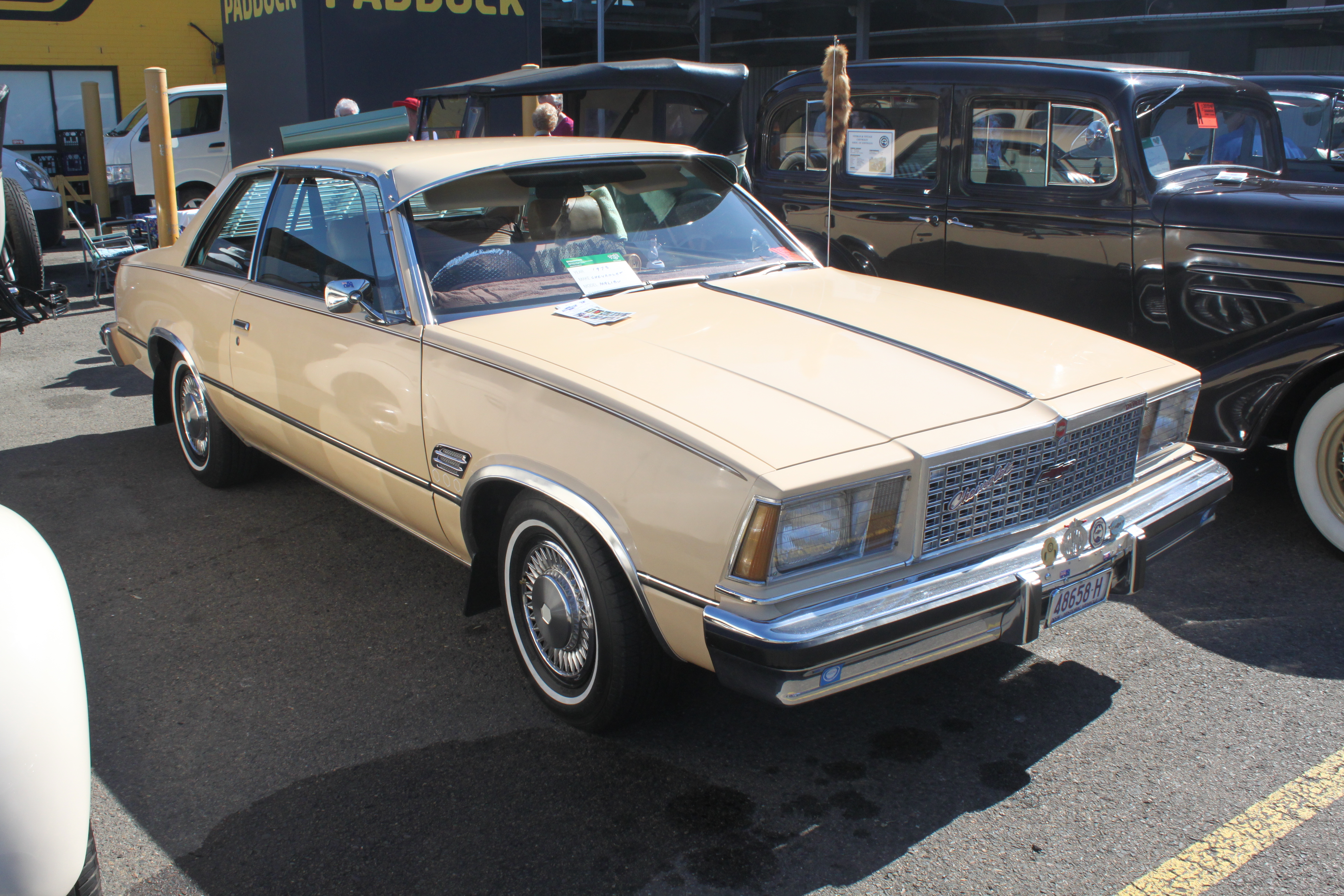
1978 Chevrolet Malibu Coupe

1980 Chevrolet Malibu Sedan

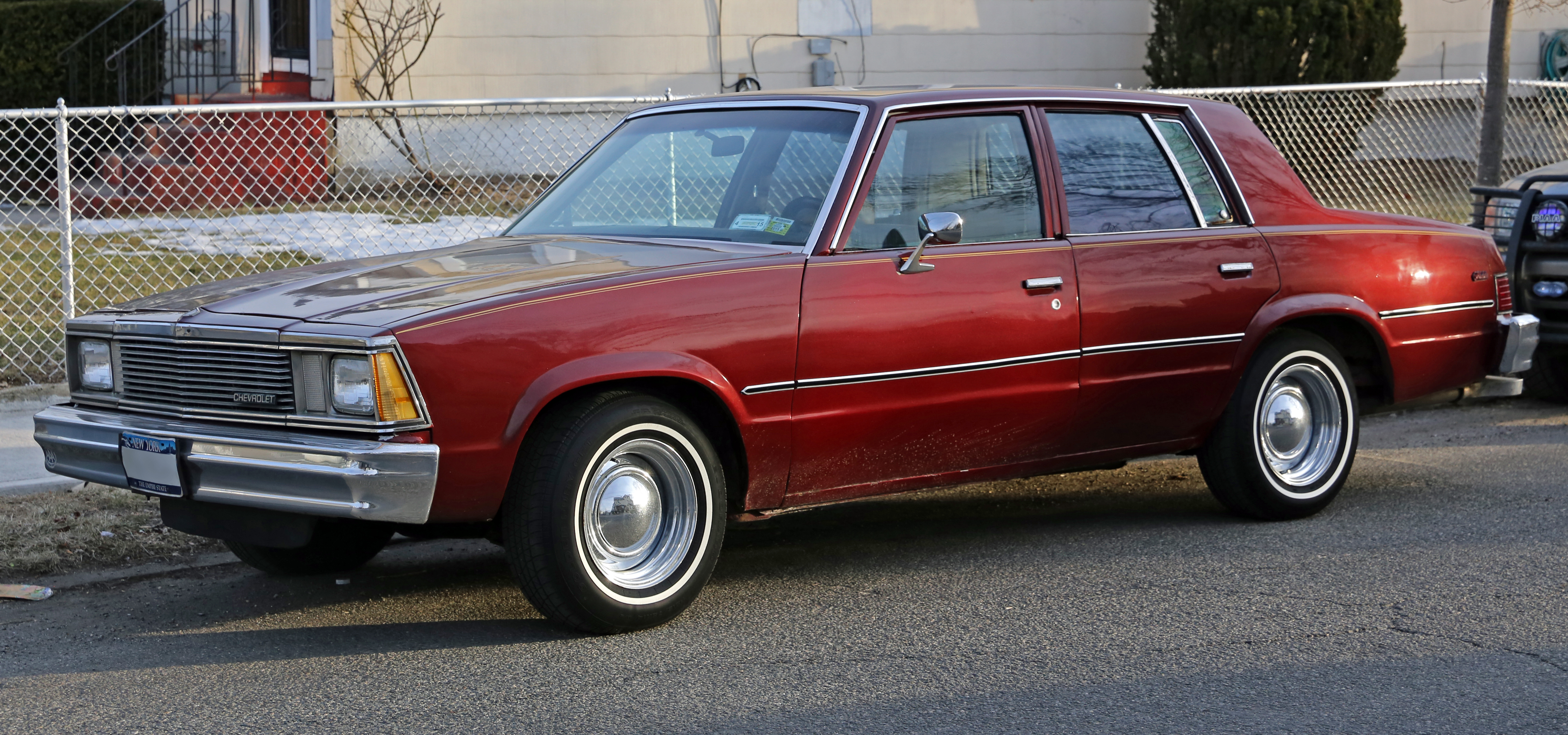
1981 Chevrolet Malibu sedan

1982 Chevrolet Malibu wagon

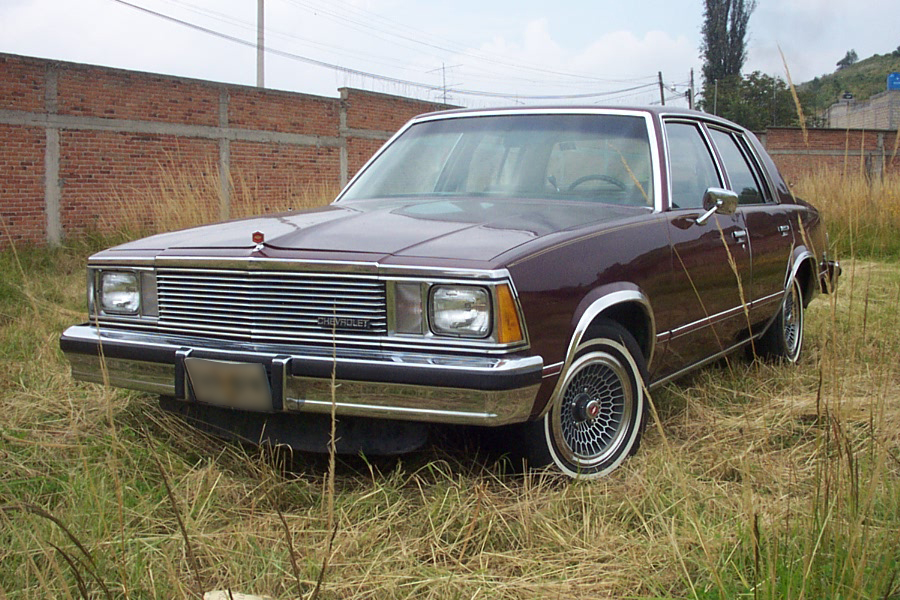
Chevrolet Malibu Classic made and sold in Mexico

=== Engines ===
The base 200 cu in (3.3 L) V6 engine for the 1978 Chevrolet Malibu developed just 95 hp (71 kW; 96 PS), with an optional upgrade to a 231 cu in (3.8 L) V6 producing 105 hp (78 kW; 106 PS), or a 305 cu in (5.0 L) V8 producing 140 hp (104 kW; 142 PS). The largest and most powerful option was the 165–170 hp (123–127 kW) 350 cu in (5.7 L) V8.

For 1982 and 1983, two Oldsmobile Diesel engines were offered: a 263 cu in (4.3 L) unit producing up to 85 hp (63 kW; 86 PS), or a 350 cu in (5.7 L) unit producing up to 105 hp (78 kW; 106 PS).

- 1978: 200 V6 (95 hp), 231 (3.8 L) V6 (105 hp), 305 V8 (140 hp), 350 V8 (165 hp)
- 1979: 200 V6 (95 hp), 231 (3.8 L) V6 (115 hp), 267 V8 (125 hp), 305 V8 (140 hp), 350 V8 (165 hp)
- 1980–1981: 229 V6 (110 hp), 231 (3.8 L) V6 (110 hp), 267 V8 (115 hp), 305 V8 (140 hp), 350 V8 (170 hp)
- 1982–1983: 229 V6 (110 hp), 231 (3.8 L) V6 (110 hp), 4.3 L V6 Diesel (85 hp), 305 V8, 350 V8 Diesel (105 hp)

Production Figures:

Chevrolet Malibu Production Figures
	Coupe	Sedan	Wagon	Yearly Total
1978	117,241	147,393	94,002	358,636
1979	127,812	163,896	120,439	412,147
1980	66,192	145,634	66,524	278,350
1981	34,711	141,551	66,185	242,447
1982	-	70,793	45,332	116,125
1983	-	61,534	55,892	117,426
Total	345,956	730,801	448,374	1,525,131

=== G platform ===
Beginning in 1982, the Malibu shared GM's redesignated rear-wheel-drive G platform with cars like the Pontiac Grand Prix, Oldsmobile Cutlass Supreme, and Buick Regal. The Malibu Classic was last marketed in 1982; Malibus were produced as four-door sedans and as station wagons until 1983, at which time it was fully replaced by the front-wheel-drive Chevrolet Celebrity. Although the sedan and wagon were phased out, the El Camino utility, which shared styling with the Malibu, remained in production until 1987.

== Fifth generation (1997) ==
Fifth generation
- 1997 Chevrolet Malibu

Overview
- Model code: GMX130
- Also called: Chevrolet Classic (2004-2005); Oldsmobile Cutlass (1997–1999)
- Production: October 1996 – 2003; 2004 – April 2005 (Classic)
- Model years: 1997–2003 (Chevrolet Malibu); 2004–2005 (Chevrolet Classic)
- Assembly: Wilmington, Delaware (Wilmington Assembly) (1997–1999); Oklahoma City, Oklahoma (Oklahoma City Assembly) (1997–2001); Lansing, Michigan (Lansing Car Assembly) (2001–2005)
- Designer: Wayne Cherry (1993)

Body and chassis
- Body style: 4-door sedan
- Layout: Transverse front-engine, front-wheel drive
- Platform: GM N platform
- Related: Oldsmobile Alero; Oldsmobile Cutlass; Pontiac Grand Am; Oldsmobile Achieva; Buick Skylark

Powertrain
- Engine: gasoline: 2.2 L L61 I4; 2.4 L LD9 I4; 3.1 L L82/LG8 V6
- Transmission: 4-speed 4T40-E automatic

Dimensions
- Wheelbase: 107.0 in (2,718 mm)
- Length: 190.4 in (4,836 mm)
- Width: 69.4 in (1,763 mm)
- Height: 56.4 in (1,433 mm)
- Curb weight: 3,051–3,142 lb (1,384–1,425 kg)

Chronology
- Predecessor: Chevrolet Corsica

For 1997, Chevrolet revived the Malibu nameplate after a 14-year hiatus, serving as the successor to the Chevrolet Corsica (the Chevrolet Beretta was not replaced). Produced solely as a four-door sedan, the revived Malibu was the first produced as a compact car and the first to use a front-wheel drive powertrain. Marking the adoption of the GM N platform by Chevrolet, the Malibu and its Oldsmobile Cutlass counterpart were the inaugural vehicles of its third generation.

Following the introduction of the sixth-generation Malibu for 2004, the N-platform Malibu was renamed the Chevrolet Classic, produced exclusively for sale to fleet customers. All N-body Malibus were produced at the Wilmington and Oklahoma City Assembly plants through 1999 and 2002 respectively; production was moved to Lansing, Michigan thereafter.

The Malibu was Motor Trend magazine's Car of the Year for 1997; this decision was later criticized by Car and Driver in 2009, citing that the Malibu was insufficiently distinguishable in terms of performance or interior quality to warrant such praise in hindsight.

=== Model details ===
Though marketed as a large compact car, the fifth generation Malibu was sized closely to its 1983 counterpart, with a 107-inch wheelbase (1 inch shorter) and 190.4-inch body length (approximately 2.3 inches shorter). In a break from design precedent, the ignition switch was relocated from the steering column to the dashboard. Alongside the standard-trim Malibu sedan, Chevrolet marketed the deluxe-trim Malibu LS.

Shared with the Chevrolet Cavalier Z24, the standard engine for the Malibu was a 150 hp 2.4 L inline-4; as an option, the Malibu adopted a 155 hp (116 kW) version of the 3.1 L V6 from the Corsica/Beretta. For 1999, the 3.1 L V6 was retuned, increasing output to 170 hp (127 kW); for 2000, it became the standard engine. As the Malibu became the Classic for 2004, the V6 was dropped in favor of the 144 hp 2.2 L Ecotec inline-4 of the sixth-generation Malibu.

From 1997 to 1999, the Malibu was styled with a five-bar grille, featuring a Chevrolet badge centered inside an ocean wave-styled badge; this badge was retained on the trunklid. For 2000, the grille was restyled with a chrome center bar holding the Chevrolet bow-tie emblem (dependent on trim, either blue or gold in color); the ocean-wave badge was retained on the trunklid.

1998 Chevrolet Malibu LS

1998 Chevrolet Malibu LS (rear)

2001 Chevrolet Malibu (facelift)

2001 Chevrolet Malibu (facelift, rear)

2005 Chevrolet Classic

2005 Chevrolet Classic (rear)

=== Engines ===
Years	Engine	Power	Torque
1997–1999.5	3.1 L GM 60° L82 V6	155 hp (116 kW)	185 lb⋅ft (251 N⋅m)
1999.5–2003	3.1 L GM 60° LG8 V6	170 hp (127 kW)	190 lb⋅ft (258 N⋅m)
1997–1999	2.4 L TwinCam LD9 I4	150 hp (112 kW)	155 lb⋅ft (210 N⋅m)
2004–2005	2.2 L Ecotec L61 I4	144 hp (107 kW)	155 lb⋅ft (210 N⋅m)

=== Malibu Cruiser ===
The Chevrolet Malibu Cruiser concept was built by GM Performance Division for the SEMA show in 2001. The car was painted in "Sublime Lime" by BASF and featured a highly modified turbocharged 3500 SFI 60-degree V6 (producing 230 hp (172 kW) at 5,000 rpm and 280 lb⋅ft (380 N⋅m) of torque at 2,900 rpm), a 4T65-E four-speed transmission with overdrive, and a set of 19 by 8-inch wheels by Evo wrapped in Toyo Proxes T1-S high-performance tires. Interior modifications included a full-length custom center console, four black leather Sparco racing seats, and a Kenwood entertainment center (with radio, CD, DVD, TV, 10-disc CD changer and numerous amps and speakers). Exterior modifications included custom HID headlamps (both low and high beams), "Altezza" style taillights, and a custom bodykit.

Chevrolet produced the Cruiser as a concept only, never making it available for purchase. The intent was to attract younger buyers to the stock model and to demonstrate the viability of aftermarket modifications.

=== Oldsmobile Cutlass (sixth generation) ===
1998 Oldsmobile Cutlass GLS

For 1997, Oldsmobile revived the Oldsmobile Cutlass nameplate after 16 years, serving as a divisional counterpart of the Malibu. To distinguish the model line from the Oldsmobile Achieva, the revived Cutlass was marketed as the successor of the Oldsmobile Cutlass Ciera four-door sedan (the Cutlass Cruiser station wagon was not replaced). In contrast with the Malibu, the Cutlass was marketed solely with a V6 engine.

Sharing nearly its entire body with the Malibu, the design of the Cutlass differed in its split grille, full-width taillamp trim, and chrome bumper trim moldings. The model line was marketed in standard trim and a flagship GLS trim (alloy wheels, standard leather seating, and optional CD/cassette player).

Intended largely as a placeholder model to fill the gap left by its predecessor, the Cutlass was discontinued after 1999 as Oldsmobile introduced the Oldsmobile Alero to replace both the Cutlass and Achieva.

== Sixth generation (GMX380; 2004) ==
Sixth generation
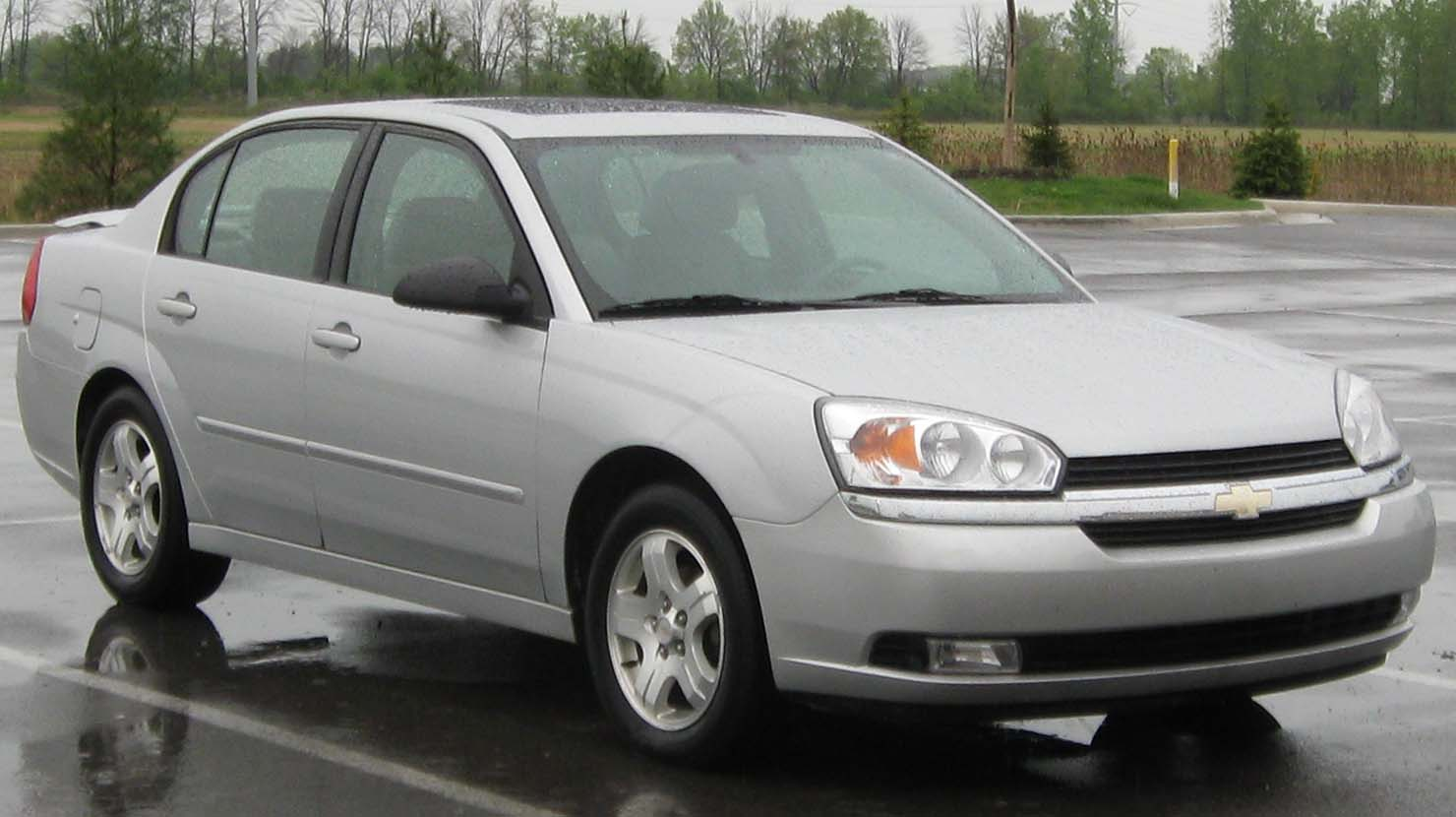

Overview
- Model code: GMX380
- Also called: Chevrolet Malibu Classic (sedan models, 2008); Chevrolet Malibu Maxx
- Production: July 2003 – 2007 (Malibu and Malibu Maxx); 2008 (Malibu Classic)
- Model years: 2004–2007; 2008 (Malibu Classic)
- Assembly: Kansas City, Kansas, U.S. (Fairfax II Assembly)
- Designer: Crystal Windham (interior: 2000)

Body and chassis
- Body style: 4-door sedan 5-door liftback (Malibu Maxx)
- Layout: Transverse front-engine, front-wheel drive
- Platform: Epsilon platform/GMX380
- Related: Opel Vectra C; Opel Signum; Saab 9-3; Pontiac G6; Saturn Aura

Powertrain
- Engine: 2.2 L L61 I4 (gasoline); 3.5 L LX9 V6 (gasoline); 3.5 L LZ4 V6 (gasoline); 3.9 L LZ9 V6 (gasoline)
- Transmission: 4-speed 4T45-E automatic; 4-speed 4T65-E automatic

Dimensions
- Wheelbase: 106.3 in (2,700 mm) (Malibu); 112.3 in (2,852 mm) (Malibu Maxx)
- Length: 187.8 in (4,770 mm) (Malibu Maxx); 188.3 in (4,783 mm) (Malibu)
- Width: 69.8 in (1,773 mm) (Malibu Maxx); 69.9 in (1,775 mm) (Malibu)
- Height: 57.5 in (1,460 mm) (Malibu); 58.1 in (1,476 mm) (Malibu Maxx)
- Curb weight: 3,174–3,415 lb (1,440–1,549 kg) (Malibu); 3,458–3,620 lb (1,569–1,642 kg) (Malibu Maxx)

The sixth-generation Malibu was released for the 2004 model year, with the previous generation model line taking on the Chevrolet Classic nameplate. The N platform was retired and was replaced by the Opel-designed Epsilon platform, introduced by the 2002 Opel Vectra C and 2003 Saab 9-3. Alongside the standard 4-door Malibu sedan, this generation was also produced as a Malibu Maxx 5-door liftback (similar in configuration to the Opel Signum). Though slightly heavier than the previous generation, the body was approximately an inch shorter in wheelbase and three inches in length.

Within North America, the Epsilon platform was initially used only for the Malibu, but was ultimately extended to Pontiac and Saturn. Along with adopting the 4-wheel independent suspension of the fifth-generation Malibu, the Epsilon chassis underwent substantial upgrades to its structural rigidity. The Quad 4-based inline-4s were retired in favor of Ecotec engines, offering similar output from lower displacement; the long-running 3.1 L V6 was replaced by the High Value V6 engine family. Alongside the introduction of optional 4-wheel disc brakes, the Epsilon chassis marked the introduction of electrically-assisted power steering, replacing traditional hydraulic assist systems with an electric motor.

From 2004 to 2005, the Malibu was styled with a front fascia design featuring a wide chrome bar running the width of the bumper, with the grille formed by a notch in both the hood and the bumper; a similar chrome bar was featured on the decklid of both the 4-door sedan and 5-door liftback. Alongside the standard Malibu trim, the sedan was offered in mid-level LS trim and deluxe LT trim, with the latter two trims offered for the Malibu Maxx. For 2006, the flagship LTZ and SS (Super Sport) trims were introduced.

For 2006, the Malibu underwent a mid-cycle revision, with the front fascia removing the chrome bar in favor of a smaller rectangular grille between the headlights (the lower air intake was also made narrower). The interior was updated with a redesigned instrument cluster and a new 4-spoke steering wheel (for non-SS models). In line with other Chevrolet models, General Motors badges were added to the front doors.

Following the introduction of the seventh-generation GMX386 Malibu for 2008, the Malibu Maxx liftback was discontinued, with the GMX380 Malibu sedan becoming the Malibu Classic for 2008. In contrast with the previous-generation Chevrolet Classic, the 2008 Malibu Classic was marketed as the four-cylinder LS (offered only for fleet sales) and the V6 LS and LT (sold for retail sale).

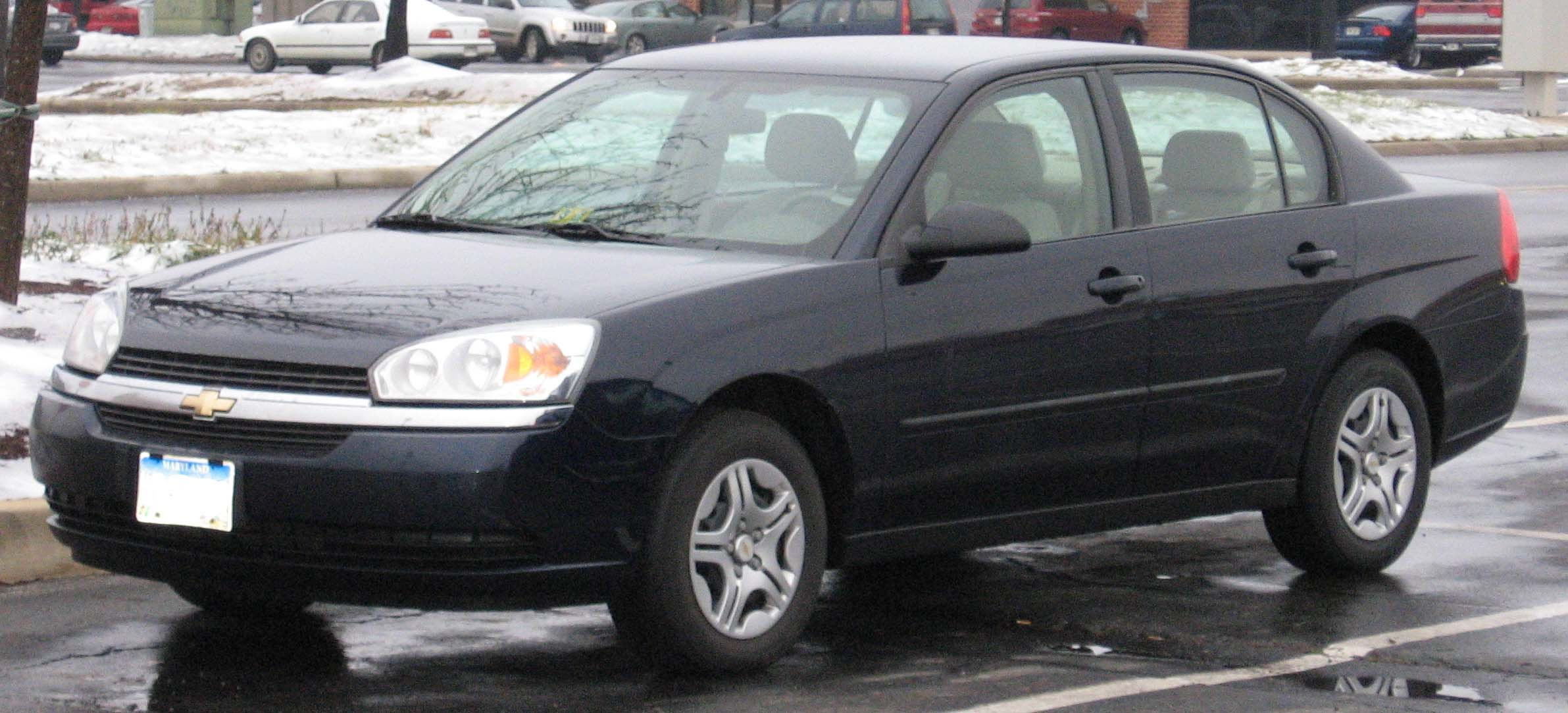
2004–2005 Chevrolet Malibu (standard trim)

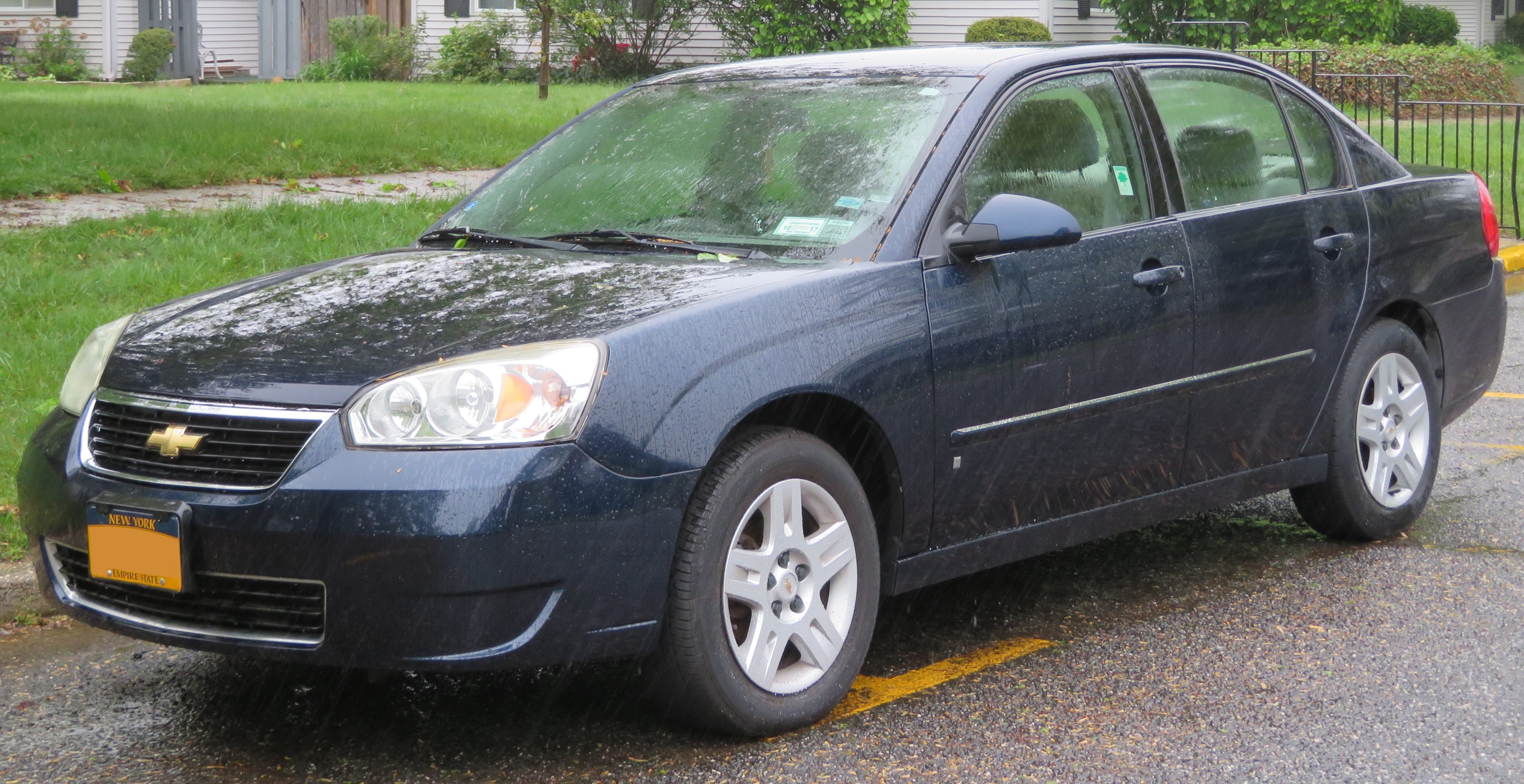
2006 Chevrolet Malibu LT (facelift)

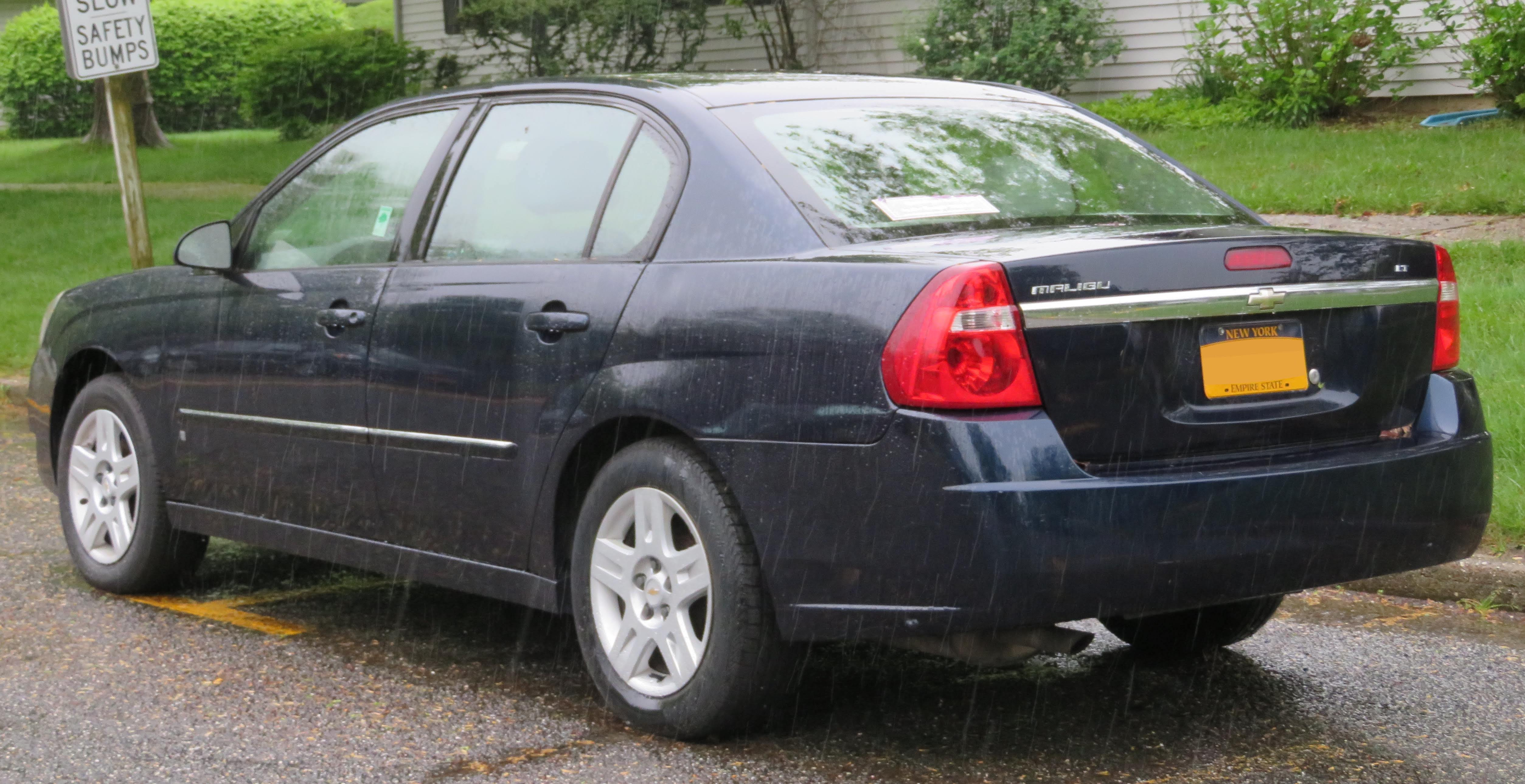
2006 Chevrolet Malibu LT (facelift, rear)

=== Powertrain details ===
Base power for the sedan came from a 2.2 L Ecotec L61 I4 producing 144 hp (107 kW). LS and LT trim sedans and Maxx models originally came with a 3.5 L 201 hp (150 kW) High Value LX9 V6. The SS sedan and Maxx models were powered by the 3.9 L 240 hp (179 kW) High Value LZ9 V6.

For 2007, the LX9 was replaced with the 217 hp (162 kW) LZ4 V6; this was the only engine available to private buyers in the 2008 Malibu Classic. The L61 Ecotec was also updated for the 2007 model year with many improvements.

Years	Engine	Power	Torque	Transmission
2004–2008	2.2 L Ecotec L61 I4	144 hp (107 kW)	155 lb⋅ft (210 N⋅m)	GM 4T45-E 4-speed automatic
2004–2006	3.5 L High Value LX9 V6	200 hp (149 kW)	220 lb⋅ft (298 N⋅m)	GM 4T45-E 4-speed automatic
2007–2008	3.5 L High Value LZ4 V6	217 hp (162 kW)	220 lb⋅ft (298 N⋅m)	GM 4T45-E 4-speed automatic
2006–2007	3.9 L High Value LZ9 V6	240 hp (179 kW)	240 lb⋅ft (325 N⋅m)	GM 4T65-E 4-speed automatic

=== Malibu Maxx ===
Introduced for 2004, the Malibu Maxx is a 5-door liftback version of the model range, using a longer-wheelbase version (lengthened to 112.3 inches) of the Epsilon platform (later used by the Pontiac G6 and Saturn Aura in North America). The first 5-door Chevrolet since the 1991 Chevrolet Corsica, the Malibu Maxx was configured similar to the 1998–2003 Saab 9-3 hatchback.

Alongside the optional sunroof, the Malibu Maxx was fitted with a fixed skylight above the rear seats (including retractable sunshades). Though the Malibu was fitted with a standard-equipment 60/40 folding rear seat, the Malibu Maxx was designed with further adjustment of the rear seat, including reclining rear seatbacks and several inches of fore-aft adjustment. For 2005, a rear-seat DVD entertainment system (mounted to the back of the center console) was introduced as an option.

The Malibu Maxx was not offered in the standard trim, but in LS, LT, and LTZ trim, alongside a Malibu Maxx SS. The Maxx was discontinued following the 2007 model year.

2004 Chevrolet Malibu Maxx LS

2004 Chevrolet Malibu Maxx LS, rear

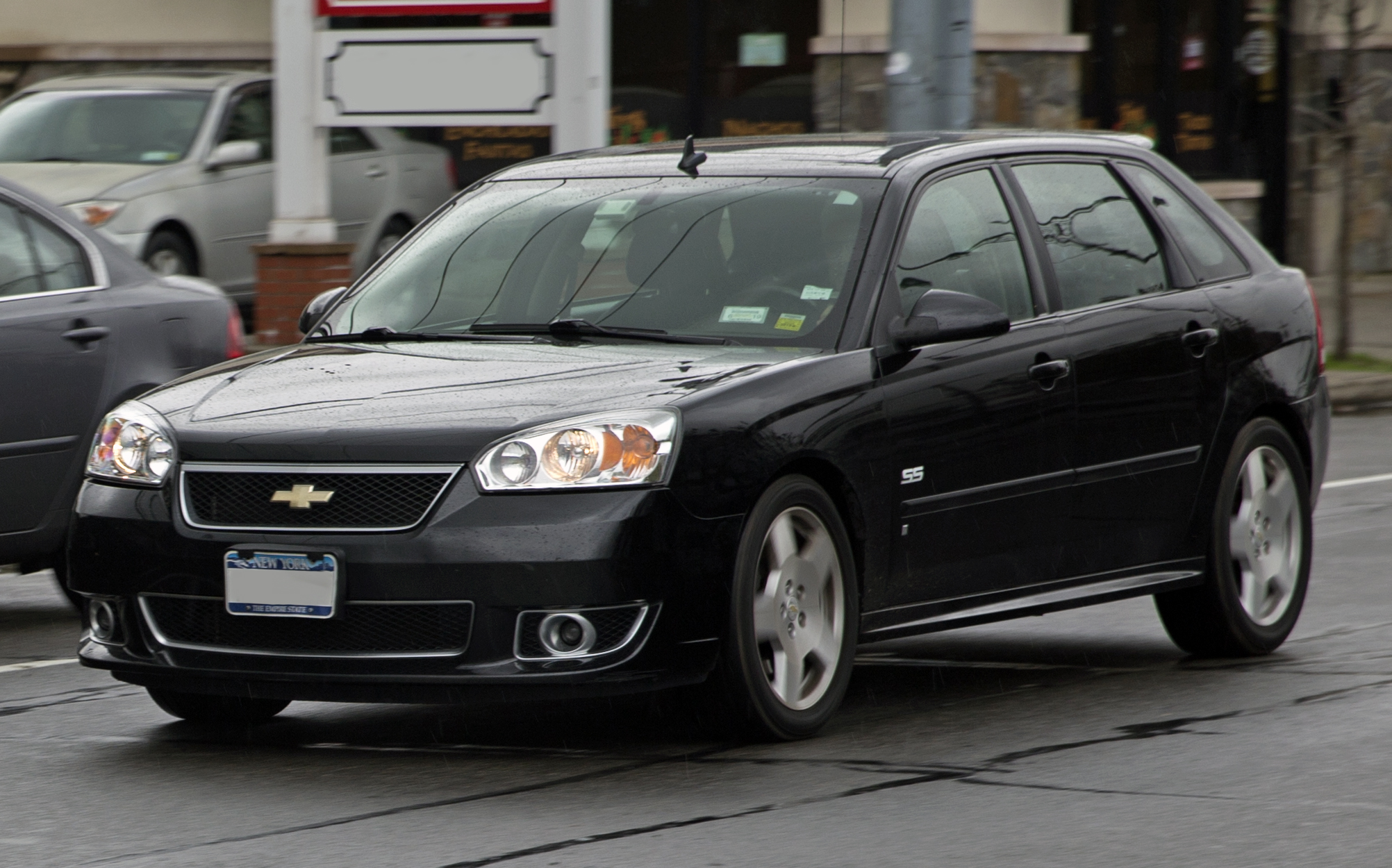
2006 Chevrolet Malibu Maxx SS

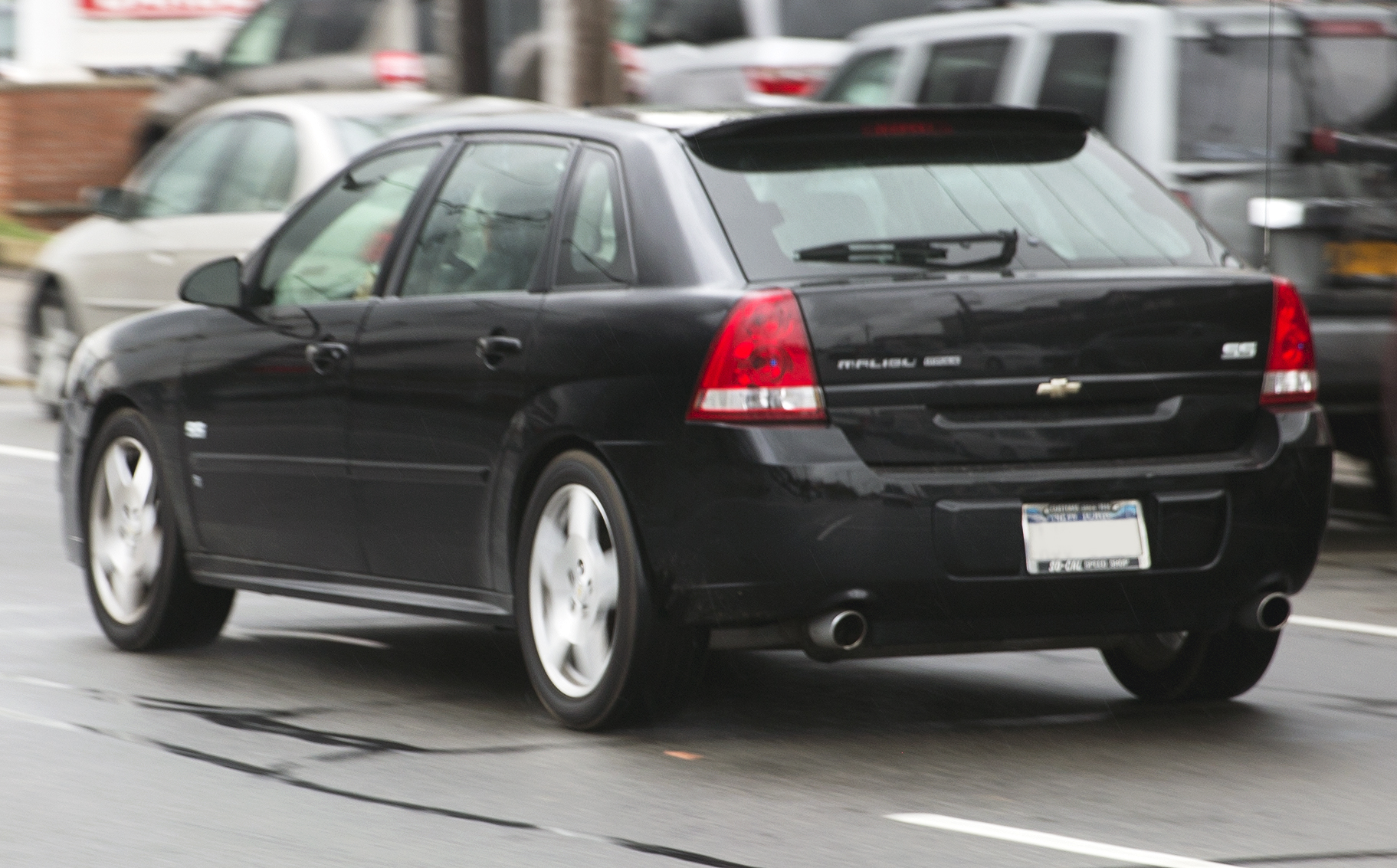
2006 Chevrolet Malibu Maxx SS

=== Malibu SS (Super Sport) ===
2006–2007 Chevrolet Malibu SS sedan

For 2006, Chevrolet revived the Super Sport option for the Malibu, reviving the Malibu SS nameplate after a 33-year hiatus. Serving as the highest-performance version of the model line, the option was offered for both the Malibu sedan and Malibu Maxx. Sharing its engine with the Chevrolet Impala and Monte Carlo, its 3.9 L LZ9 V6 produced 240 hp (179 kW) and 240 lb⋅ft (325 N⋅m); its transmission shifter allowed for manual "Tap up/down" shifting. In addition to model-exclusive 18-inch alloy wheels, the chassis was fitted with a front strut tower brace; the electric power steering system was replaced by a hydraulic-assist system. The FE5 system of the Malibu SS sedan utilized the stiffest settings of any Epsilon-platform vehicle; the Malibu Maxx SS used the slightly softer FE2 suspension (shared with the Pontiac G6 GT).

To distinguish the Malibu (Maxx) SS from the rest of the Malibu line, the SS was fitted with a model-exclusive upper-and lower grille pattern; the chrome bar on the rear decklid was painted body color. In place of the free-standing spoiler design, the SS replaced the pedestal-type spoiler with a lip-style design; the Malibu Maxx SS was fitted with a larger version of its roof-mounted spoiler. The exterior was also fitted with more aggressively-styled lower bodywork, along with chrome-trimmed exhaust tips. The interior was fitted with a three-spoke steering wheel (fitted with an SS badge instead of a Chevrolet bow-tie emblem), silver interior trim, and cloth/leather seat trim. Sharing many features of the LTZ (with the primary exception of heated seats and a fold-flat front passenger seat), the SS largely served as the flagship of the model line.

For the 2008 Malibu Classic, the Malibu SS was dropped alongside the Malibu Maxx.

=== Safety ===
IIHS scores (2004)
Moderate overlap front (original test)	Good	
Side (original test)	Good	with optional side airbags
Side (original test)	Poor	without optional side airbags
Head restraints and seats	Acceptable	

== Seventh generation (2008) ==
Seventh generation
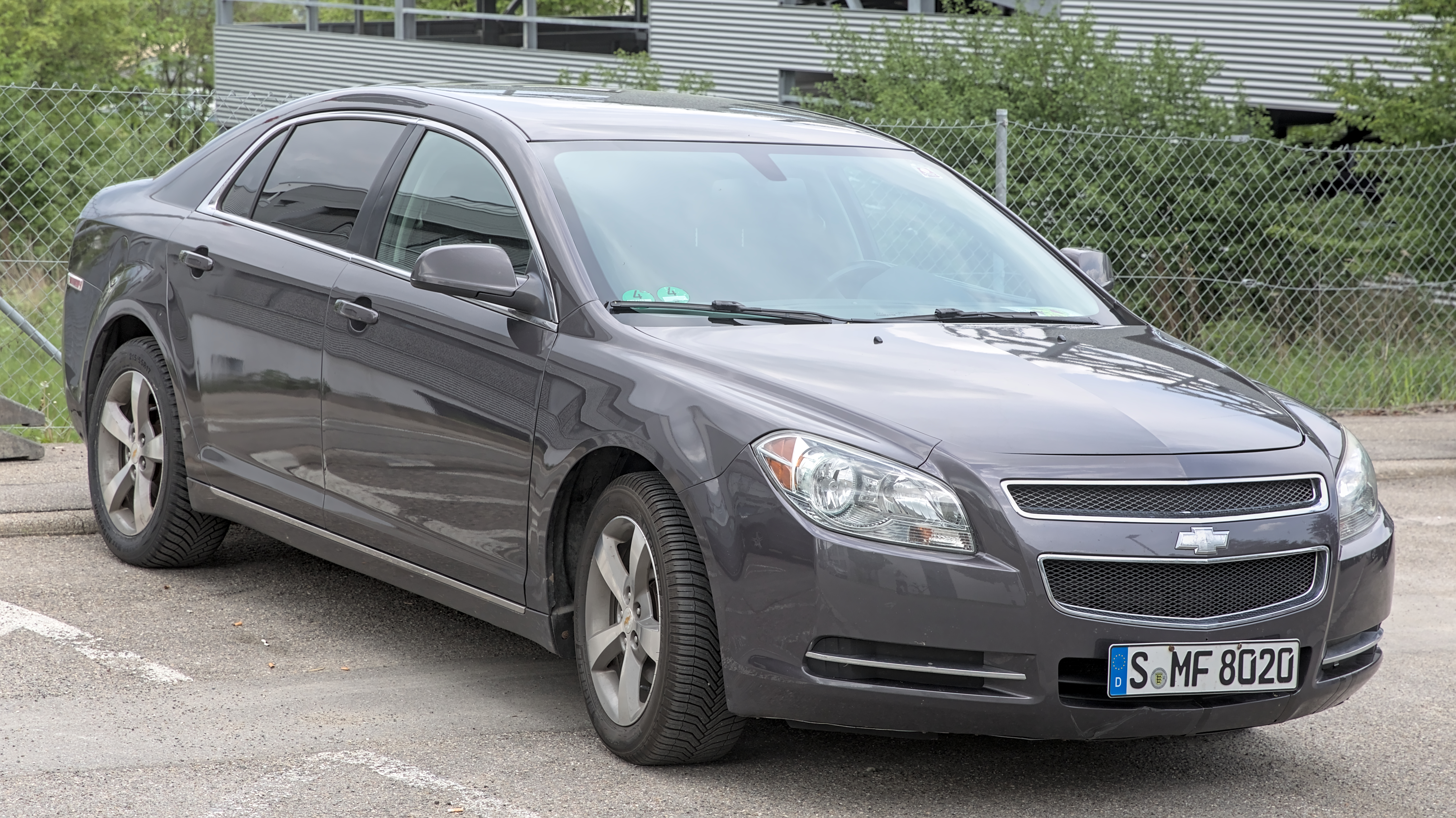

Overview
- Production: 2007–2012
- Model years: 2008–2012
- Assembly: Kansas City, Kansas, U.S. (Fairfax Assembly); Orion Township, Michigan, U.S. (Orion Assembly)
- Designer: Bryan Nesbitt (2004)

Body and chassis
- Body style: 4-door sedan
- Layout: Transverse front-engine, front-wheel drive
- Platform: Epsilon platform/GMX386
- Related: Saab 9-3; Pontiac G6; Saturn Aura; Cadillac BLS; Fiat Croma; Opel Vectra

Powertrain
- Engine: 2.4 L LE5 I4 (gasoline); 2.4 L LE9 I4 (gasoline/E85); 2.4 L LAT I4 (hybrid gasoline); 3.5 L LZ4 V6 (gasoline); 3.5 L LZE V6 (gasoline/E85); 3.6 L LY7 V6 (gasoline)
- Transmission: 4-speed 4T45 automatic; 6-speed 6T40 automatic; 6-speed 6T70 automatic
- Hybrid drivetrain: BAHVs (Malibu Hybrid Generation I)

Dimensions
- Wheelbase: 112.3 in (2,852 mm)
- Length: 191.8 in (4,872 mm)
- Width: 70.3 in (1,786 mm)
- Height: 57.1 in (1,450 mm)
- Curb weight: 3,415–3,649 lb (1,549–1,655 kg)

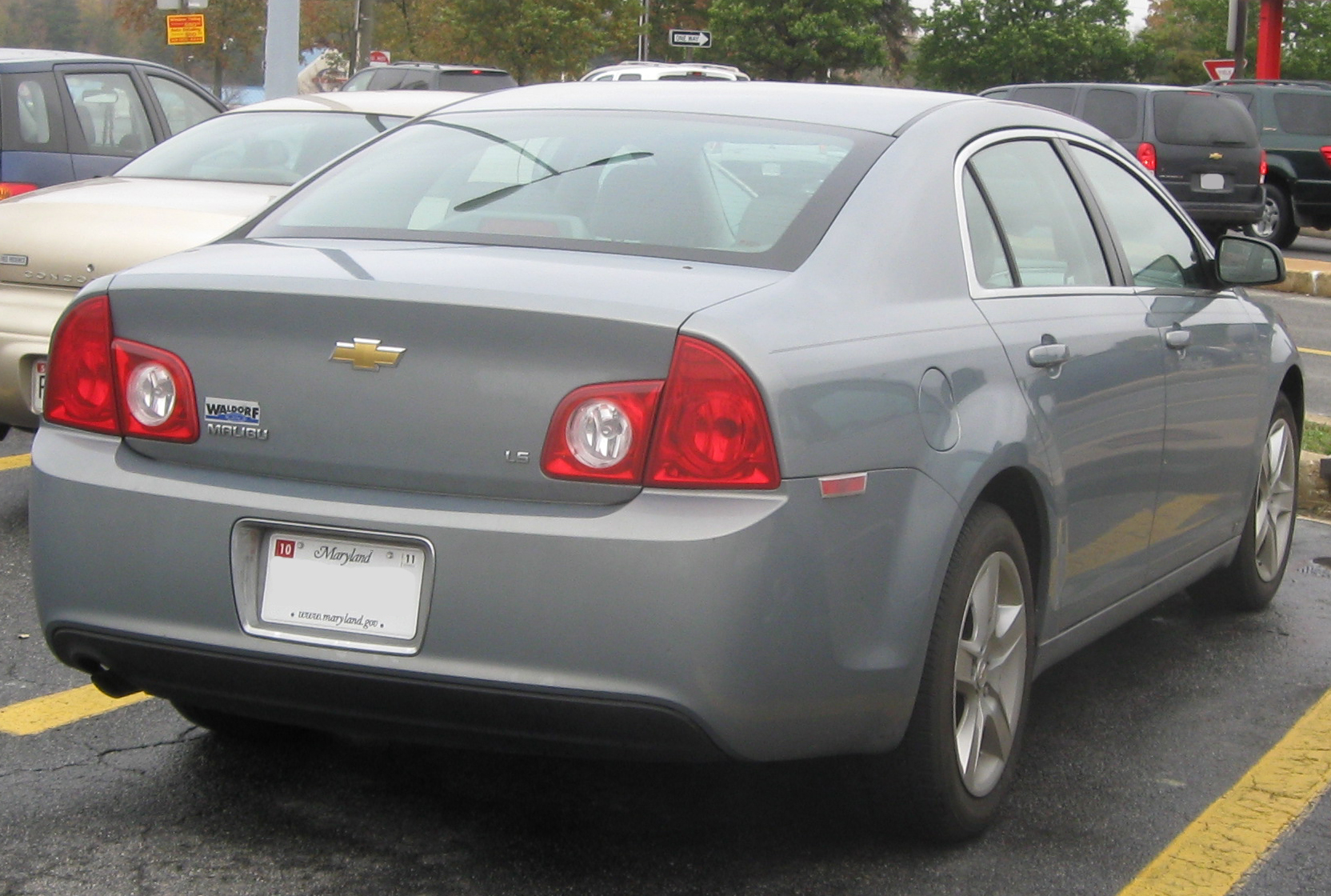
Rear view

The Malibu was extensively redesigned and reengineered for the 2008 model year, with styling by Bryan Nesbitt. GM vice chairman Robert Lutz was determined to make the nameplate competitive with Japanese mid-size cars.

Trim levels were LS, LT, Hybrid (2008 and 2009 only), and LTZ. The LTZ trim had clear brake light lenses with red LEDs, while all other trims retained red lenses with conventional brake lights. The seventh-generation Malibu used a variant of the long-wheelbase Epsilon platform shared with the Saturn Aura, Opel Signum, and Pontiac G6. It was assembled in Kansas City, Kansas. Overall, it was three inches (76 mm) longer, with a 6 inches (152 mm) longer wheelbase. Interior room remains mid-size, like the previous Malibus, and has been decreased from 101 cubic feet (2.9 m^{3}) to 97.7 cubic feet (2.8 m^{3}) despite having a longer wheelbase, although front legroom has increased from 41.9 in (1,064 mm) to 42.2 in (1,072 mm). Rear legroom has decreased from 38.5 in (978 mm) to 37.6 in (955 mm). The interior design was revised, with a selection of two-tone color combinations (brick and tan two-tone), telescoping steering wheel, higher-quality materials, and a twin-cowl dash design. The drag coefficient for the LTZ is 0.33.

=== Powertrain ===
The seventh-generation Malibu offered these engine choices:

Years	Disp.	RPO	Description	Power	Torque	Transmission	EPA City	EPA Hwy	Notes
2008–2010	2.4 L	LE5	Ecotec inline-4	169 hp (126 kW)	160 lb⋅ft (217 N⋅m)	4-speed automatic	22	30	
2008–2012	2.4 L	LE5	Ecotec inline-4	169 hp (126 kW)	160 lb⋅ft (217 N⋅m)	6-speed automatic	22	33	
2008–2010	2.4 L	LAT	Ecotec hybrid inline-4	164 hp (122 kW)	159 lb⋅ft (216 N⋅m)	4-speed automatic	26	34	
2008–2010	3.5 L	LZ4	High Value V6	217 hp (162 kW)	214 lb⋅ft (290 N⋅m)	4-speed automatic	18	29	Fleet only
2009–2010	3.5 L	LZE	High Value V6 (E85)	211 hp (157 kW)	216 lb⋅ft (293 N⋅m)	4-speed automatic	19	29	Fleet only
2008–2012	3.6 L	LY7	High Feature V6	252 hp (188 kW)	251 lb⋅ft (340 N⋅m)	6-speed automatic	17	26	

The 2.4 L I4 and 3.6 L V6 engine have aluminum blocks and heads, dual overhead cams, four valves per cylinder, twin balance shafts (I4 only), and variable valve timing. The 3.5 L V6 has aluminum heads, an iron block, overhead valves, and limited variable valve timing. The 3.5 L V6 was offered as an upgrade for special-order fleet vehicles in place of the Ecotec engine; it was only available on LS and 2009 LT models. Partway through the 2008 model year, the 2.4 L Ecotec was offered with a six-speed automatic transmission to improve performance and fuel economy.

For 2009, the six-speed transmission mated to the 2.4 L 4-cylinder engine or the 217-horsepower 3.5 L V6 mated to the four-speed automatic were made available on the 1LT; the six-speed became standard on 2LT models the same year. The LS models were equipped with the four-speed transmission only. A manual transmission was not offered. Chevrolet dropped the Malibu Maxx station wagon model. The side marker lights were removed from the fenders.

Midway through the 2010 model year, the GM badges were removed from the front doors. The trim-level badge was located from the right side of the trunk lid to the left, next to the "Malibu" badge. Four-cylinder models (except Hybrid) became available with E85 capability.

OnStar was included on all Malibu models as standard equipment (excluding fleet vehicles, where this feature was optional). Six airbags were also standard on the seventh-generation Malibu: two dual-stage front bags, two side-impact curtain air bags protecting the heads of both front and rear passengers, and two side-impact thorax bags mounted in the front seats. Traction control, electronic tire pressure monitoring system, four-wheel disc brakes, anti-lock brakes, and daytime running lamps were standard safety features on all Malibus. GM's StabiliTrak electronic stability control was standard on all models including the base LS model.

For 2011, the base LS (1LS) Malibu gained more standard features, such as Bluetooth technology with stereo audio playback capability, a remote USB and iPod/iPhone port, remote start, a security alarm, an upgraded OnStar system, power front driver's seat, chrome hubcap wheel covers, body-colored side mirrors with power adjustments and body-colored accents, a single faux wood dashboard accent, and a six-speed automatic transmission with overdrive and manual shift capabilities. The LT (1LT) model lost its available eight-speaker Bose premium sound system. The LT (2LT) received a package that included a sunroof, power heated leather seats, and more convenience and comfort features. The four-speed automatic transmission was dropped from the Malibu powertrain lineup. This same model year also saw the deletion of the steering-wheel mounted paddle shifters on six-speed automatic models in favor of a selector-mounted rocker switch for manual operation.

Hybrid version

A BAS mild hybrid, with the base inline-4 like the Saturn Aura Green Line, was available offering an increased fuel economy of 24 mpg_{‑US} (9.8 L/100 km; 29 mpg_{‑imp})/32 mpg_{‑US} (7.4 L/100 km; 38 mpg_{‑imp}), which for the 2009 model was increased to 26 mpg_{‑US} (9.0 L/100 km; 31 mpg_{‑imp})/34 mpg_{‑US} (6.9 L/100 km; 41 mpg_{‑imp}). For the 2010 model year, the Malibu Hybrid was only available for fleet orders; it was discontinued altogether the following year.

=== Reception ===
The 2008 Malibu received critical praise from the automotive press, with The New York Times referring to it as being "like a super Accord, but from GM" and Car and Driver magazine declaring, "Camry, Beware." It also garnered high praise from Motor Trend magazine, who rated it higher than the Honda Accord and Nissan Altima in its 2008 Car of the Year competition. Kelley Blue Book named it the "2008 best redesigned vehicle". Car and Driver stated that while it would not be "enough to steal the top-dog sales title from the perennial Honda and Toyota mid-sizers", they noted that "for the first time since Chevrolet revived the storied nameplate in 1997, it has enough of what it needs to sell in significant numbers to the public, not just rental fleets".

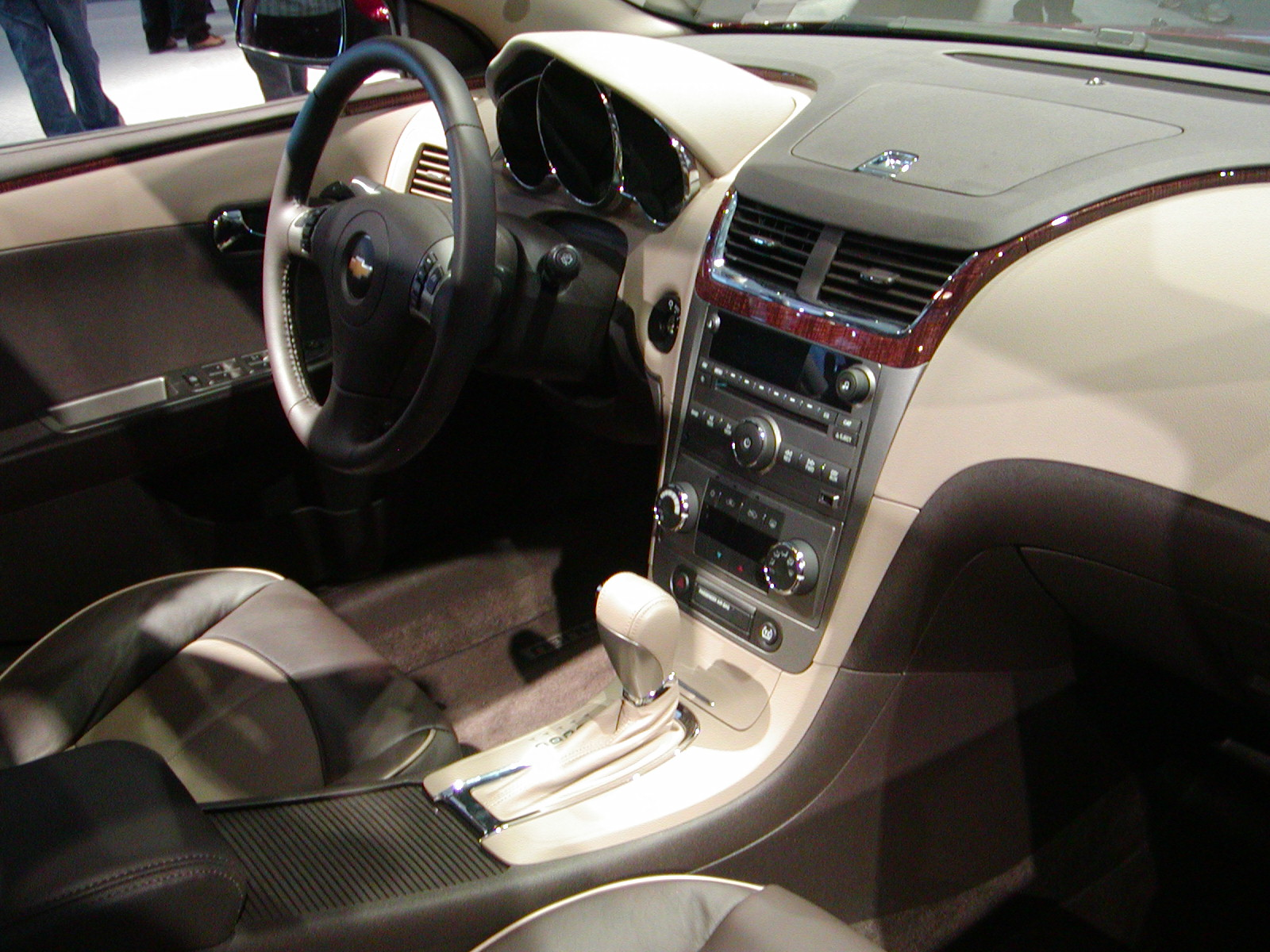
Interior

Edmunds.com praised the Malibu's interior and exterior styling, quietness, and balance between ride and handling, while criticizing the thick C-pillars that obstruct the driver's view, the narrower chassis compared to other mid-size cars, (which reduces rear seating room and also lacks a center armrest) and lack of features such as dual-zone HVAC, Bluetooth compatibility, and keyless ignition.

While Robert Cumberford, design critic at Automobile magazine, noted that the interior of the Malibu's platform cousin, the Saturn Aura, featured cheap interior materials, he noted that these materials were improved in the Malibu. Other critics believed that Chevrolet would be getting back on track in quality and excitement in the mid-size segment after a history of ordinary, bland offerings, such as the Celebrity, Corsica, Lumina and even the previous two generations of Malibu since its 1997 revival.

In January 2008, the redesigned Malibu received the North American Car of the Year award at the North American International Auto Show in Detroit, in voting among a panel of 50 automotive journalists in a field of entries, with the runners up being the 2008 Cadillac CTS and the 2008 Honda Accord. The Malibu's win marked the second straight year a car built on GM's Epsilon platform won the North American COTY award, with the 2007 award having gone to the 2007 Saturn Aura.

Initial sales results were positive, with the Malibu joining the Cadillac CTS and Buick Enclave on a list of GM vehicles whose sales exceeded expectations. The redesigned Malibu sold more than 50% more units in 2008 than in 2007, increasing GM's mid-size market share to 8.4% from 5.7%, while the Camry and Accord percentages remained flat at about 21% and 17.5%, according to GM. Sales to rental customers dropped to 27% of the total, as GM limited sales to rental fleets.

The short-lived Malibu Hybrid, along with its sister, the Saturn Aura Green Line, which share the powertrain and other major components, was particularly criticized due to its lack of fuel savings and cost (relative to a standard 4-cylinder Malibu), in addition to the Hybrid's worsened driving dynamics.

=== Recall ===
On September 21, 2012, General Motors recalled 473,841 vehicles, including the Chevrolet Malibu, Pontiac G6, and Saturn Aura, from model years 2007 through 2010 equipped with four-speed automatic transmissions. The recall stemmed from a condition that could make cars roll when in park. The recall affected 426,240 vehicles in the United States, 40,029 in Canada, and 7,572 in other markets.

=== Safety ===
IIHS scores (2008)
Moderate overlap front (original test)	Good
Side (original test)	Good
Roof strength	Good
Head restraints and seats	Marginal

== Eighth generation (2013) ==
Eighth generation
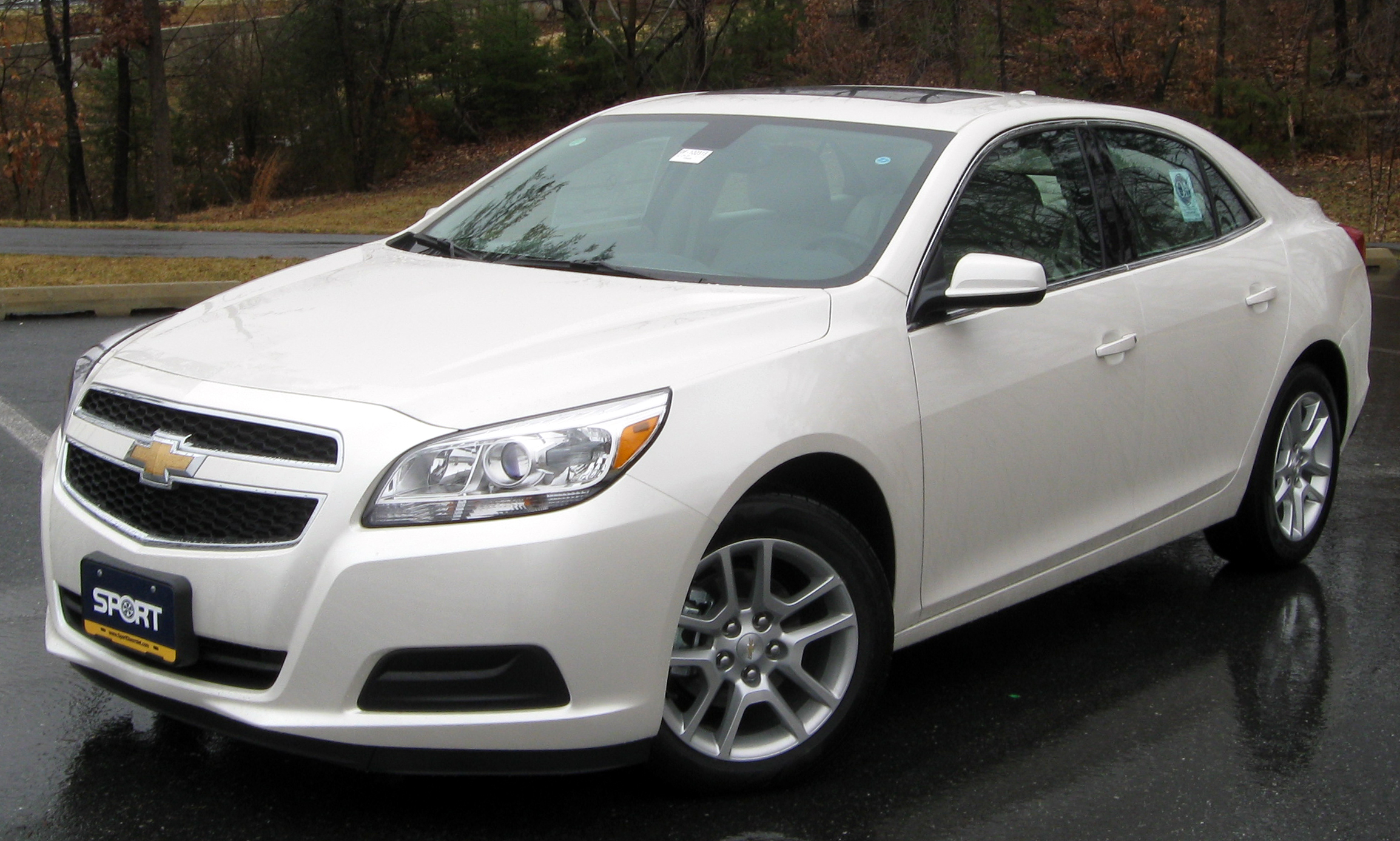

Overview
- Also called: Holden Malibu (Australasia); Chevrolet Malibu Limited (2016 only)
- Production: October 18, 2011 – 2016 (North America); 2012–2019 (China)
- Model years: 2013–2015; 2016 (Malibu Limited); 2013–2019 (China)
- Assembly: Detroit, Michigan, U.S. (Detroit/Hamtramck Assembly); Kansas City, Kansas, U.S. (Fairfax Assembly); Bupyeong, South Korea (GM Korea); Jinqiao, China (Shanghai GM); Tashkent, Uzbekistan (GM Uzbekistan); Kaliningrad, Russia (Avtotor)
- Designer: Dan Gifford (2009)

Body and chassis
- Body style: 4-door sedan
- Layout: Transverse front-engine, front-wheel drive
- Platform: GM Epsilon II SWB/GMX351
- Related: Buick Regal; Opel Insignia

Powertrain
- Engine: gasoline: 1.5 L EcoTec Turbo l4 (China); 1.6 L EcoTec Turbo I4 (China); 2.0 L EcoTec Turbo I4; 2.4 L LEA l4; 2.5 L LCV/LKW I4; 3.0 L LFW V6 (GCC); gasoline hybrid; 2.4 L LUK I4; diesel: 2.0 L VCDi Turbo Diesel I4
- Transmission: 6-speed 6T40 automatic; 6-speed 6T70 automatic; 6-speed Aisin AWTF-80 automatic (South Korea); 6-speed manual (Europe and Uzbekistan)
- Hybrid drivetrain: BAHVs (Malibu Hybrid Generation II)

Dimensions
- Wheelbase: 107.8 in (2,738 mm)
- Length: 191.3 in (4,859 mm)
- Width: 73.0 in (1,854 mm)
- Height: 57.6 in (1,463 mm)
- Curb weight: 3,393–3,660 lb (1,539–1,660 kg)

Chronology
- Predecessor: Daewoo Tosca/Chevrolet Epica/Holden Epica
- Successor: Holden Commodore (ZB) (Australia)

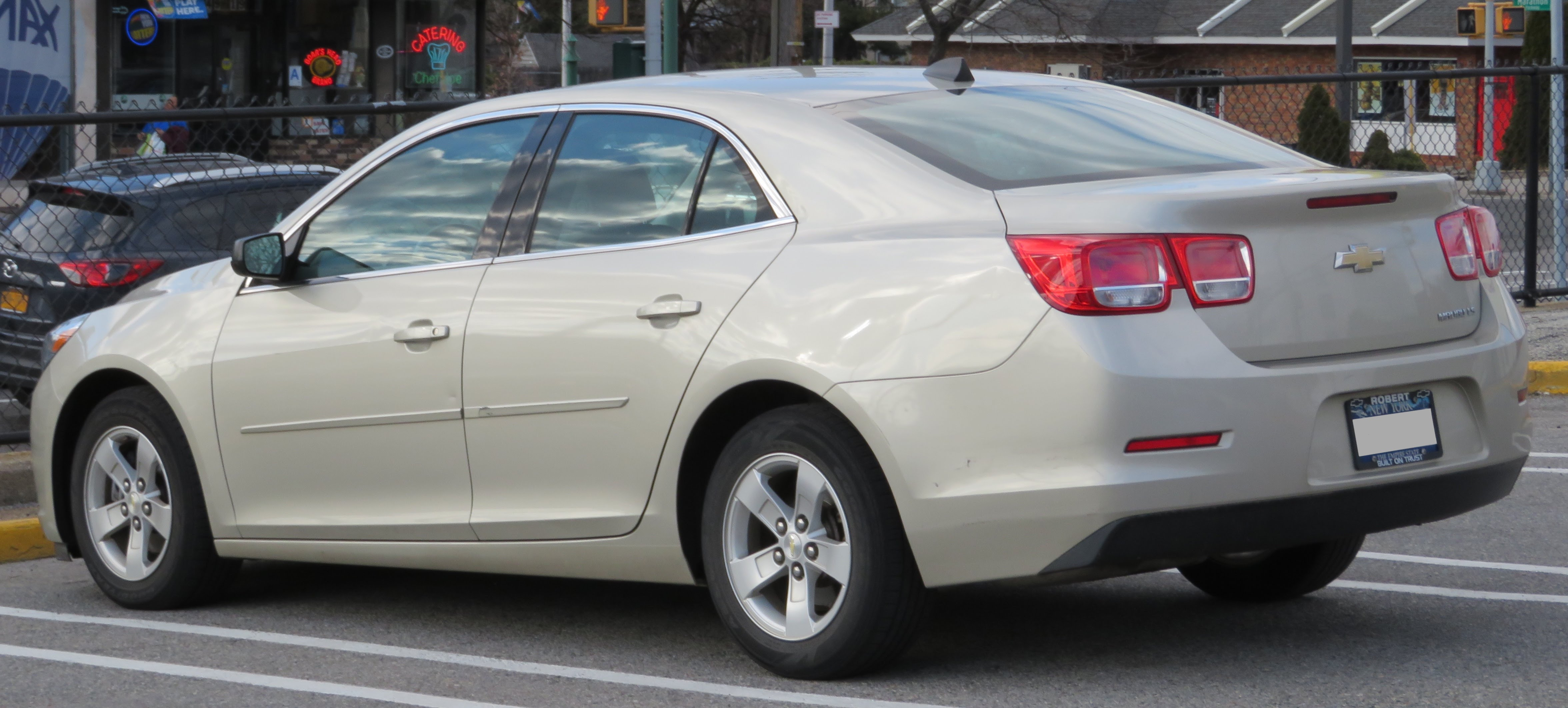
Chevrolet Malibu (America)

The 2013 Malibu moved to GM Epsilon II platform and debuted in Asia in late 2011, followed by North America in 2012. The new Malibu became a global vehicle, replacing both the North American Malibu and GM Korea vehicles previously sold around the world. The Malibu was unveiled as a show car simultaneously at Auto Shanghai in China (named Chinese: 迈锐宝; pinyin: mài ruì bǎo), and on Facebook, on April 18, 2011. It was also shown at the New York International Auto Show in New York City later in April.

The eighth-generation Malibu was available in the following trim levels: LS (1LS; retail only), LT (1LT and 2LT), ECO (1SA and 2SA), and LTZ (1LZ). Both ECO models officially went on sale in the spring of 2012, with the gasoline-only models following in late summer of 2012. The Turbo models, available in LT (3LT) and LTZ (2LZ) trims and featuring specially-tuned suspension and steering along with larger brakes, followed in early 2013. All models, aside from the LS, were equipped with a large touch-screen display using Chevrolet's MyLink and offering Pandora internet radio playback capabilities via a USB cable and an iPhone 4, 4S, or 5. SiriusXM Travel Link was also included on all navigation-equipped Malibu models.

=== Markets ===
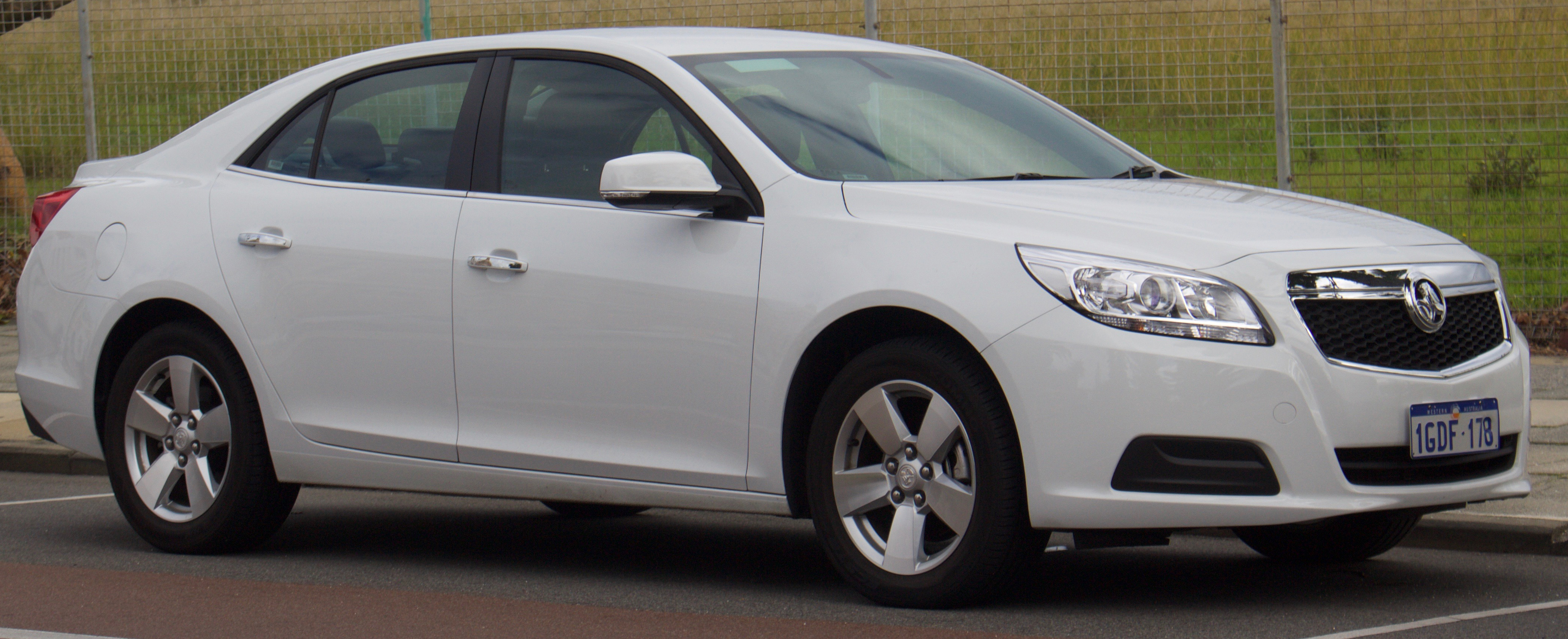
2016 Holden Malibu

The eighth-generation Malibu was sold in "nearly 100 countries on six continents". In the United States, it was manufactured at GM's Fairfax and Detroit/Hamtramck plants. In Australia and New Zealand, the South Korean–made Malibu replaced the Holden Epica, and made its debut in 2013 as the Holden Malibu, positioned between the Holden Cruze and Holden Commodore. In South Korea, the Malibu replaced the Daewoo Tosca, after GM phased out the Daewoo brand in favor of Chevrolet. Korea was the first market to receive the Malibu, in late 2011, followed by China later in 2011 and North America beginning in early 2012. The Malibu made its Middle Eastern debut in 2012 replacing the Holden VE Commodore based Lumina. In Europe, the Malibu replaced the Chevrolet Epica. The facelifted Malibu was never sold in Europe. In the Philippines, the Malibu was introduced in late 2013 for the 2014 model year, where it replaced the Chevrolet Lumina, marking Chevrolet's return to the executive sedan segment since the Lumina was discontinued in the mid-2000s. The car was sold there until 2017, and was assembled in South Korea.

In North America, the eighth-generation Malibu continued to be sold in 2016 as the Malibu Limited as the next generation went on sale. It was mostly identical to the 2015 model, but only featured the 2013 I4 engine variant (LCV instead of LKW) without auto stop-start. Trim levels included LS, LT, and LTZ.

In China, the eighth-generation Malibu remained in production alongside the ninth-generation Malibu until 2019. It received a facelift in 2016. A 1.5-liter turbo engine was added for the 2017 model year.

=== Powertrains ===
The eighth-generation Malibu was offered mostly with four-cylinder engines and six-speed automatic transmissions. The North American version was offered exclusively with four-cylinder engines, with a 2.5 L serving as the base engine, with a 2.4 L mild hybrid and a 2.0 L turbocharged engine being offered. The European version was offered with a 2.4 L Ecotec engine with an aluminum block and cylinder head, and a 2.0 L Diesel (1,956 cc) VCDi developing 160 PS (120 kW). The version offered in the Middle East had either the 2.4 L Ecotec engine or a 3.0 L V6 engine making 260 PS and 290 Nm. Two Holden-badged versions were offered in the Australian market: the CD and the CDX, with the 2.4 L Ecotec or 2.0 L diesel.

==== Engines ====
Gasoline
Type	Power	Torque	Transmission	Years	EPA-estimated fuel economy, MPG (city/hwy)
2.4 L (2,384 cc) LUK I-4 with eAssist	182 hp (136 kW; 185 PS) at 6200 rpm	172 lb⋅ft (233 N⋅m) at 4900 rpm	6-speed automatic	2013–2014	25 / 36 (2013) 24 / 35 (2014)
2.4 L (2,384 cc) LEA I-4	170 hp (127 kW; 172 PS) at 5800 rpm	170 lb⋅ft (230 N⋅m) at 4600 rpm	6-speed manual/6-speed automatic	2013–2016 (Europe and Middle East)	
2.5 L (2,499 cc) LKW I-4	196 hp (146 kW; 199 PS) at 6300 rpm	191 lb⋅ft (259 N⋅m) at 4400 rpm	6-speed automatic	2013–2015 (North America)	22 / 33 (2013) 25 / 36 (2014–2015)
2.5 L (2,499 cc) LCV I-4	197 hp (147 kW; 200 PS) at 6300 rpm	191 lb⋅ft (259 N⋅m) at 4400 rpm	6-speed automatic	2016 (North America)	23 / 33
2.0 L (1,998 cc) LTG I-4 (t/c)	259 hp (193 kW; 263 PS) at 5500 rpm	295 lb⋅ft (400 N⋅m) at 1700–5500 rpm	6-speed automatic	2013–2015	21 / 29
3.0 L (2,997 cc) LFW V6	260 hp (194 kW; 264 PS) at 6900 rpm	214 lb⋅ft (290 N⋅m) at 5600 rpm	6-speed automatic	2013–2016 (Middle East)	
Diesel (European, Australian, Korean market only)
Type	Power	Torque	Transmission	Years	Notes
2.0 L (1,956 cc) VCDi I-4 (t/c)	118 kW (160 PS; 158 hp) at 4000 rpm	350 N⋅m (258 lb⋅ft) at 1750 rpm	6-speed manual/6-speed automatic	2013–2015	

=== Safety ===
Standard safety features on the eighth-generation Malibu include dual-stage front airbags for the driver and front passenger, along with pelvic/thorax side-impact and knee airbags up front. Roof rail airbags with rollover protection are standard. Optionally available are second-row head/thorax side-impact airbags, lane departure warning system with forward collision alert, and a rearview camera system.

The US-made Malibu, in its most basic Latin American market configuration with 10 airbags, received four stars for adult occupants and one star for toddlers from Latin NCAP 1.0 in 2013.

Latin NCAP 1.5 test results Chevrolet Malibu + 10 Airbags (2013, similar to Euro NCAP 2002)
Test	Points	Stars
Adult occupant:	14.56/17.0	4 /5 stars
Child occupant:	8.57/49.00	1 /5 stars

IIHS scores (2013)
Small overlap front (driver)	Marginal	
Moderate overlap front (original test)	Good	
Side (original test)	Good	
Roof strength	Good	
Head restraints and seats	Good	
Front crash prevention: vehicle-to-vehicle	Basic	Optional system

ANCAP test results* Holden Malibu all variants (2013)
Test	Score
Overall	5 /5 stars
Frontal offset	15.47/16
Side impact	16/16
Pole	2/2
Seat belt reminders	2/3
Whiplash protection	Good
Pedestrian protection	Adequate
Electronic stability control	Standard

=== Reception ===
In a March 2012 comparison test by Car and Driver, the "light electrification" Chevrolet Malibu Eco hybrid came in sixth place out of six cars. The Eco is not a Malibu LS, LT, or LTZ. The Malibu Eco was criticized for its reduced wheelbase, causing a 0.8" reduction in legroom for back seat passengers. The interior was also criticized for being disappointing and cramped. The ride, however, was said to be smooth and quiet, with the only problem being the stiff steering.

The 2014 Malibu received the highest score in its class from J.D. Power's 2014 Initial Quality Study, which "examines problems experienced by vehicle owners during the first 90 days of ownership."

=== Updates ===
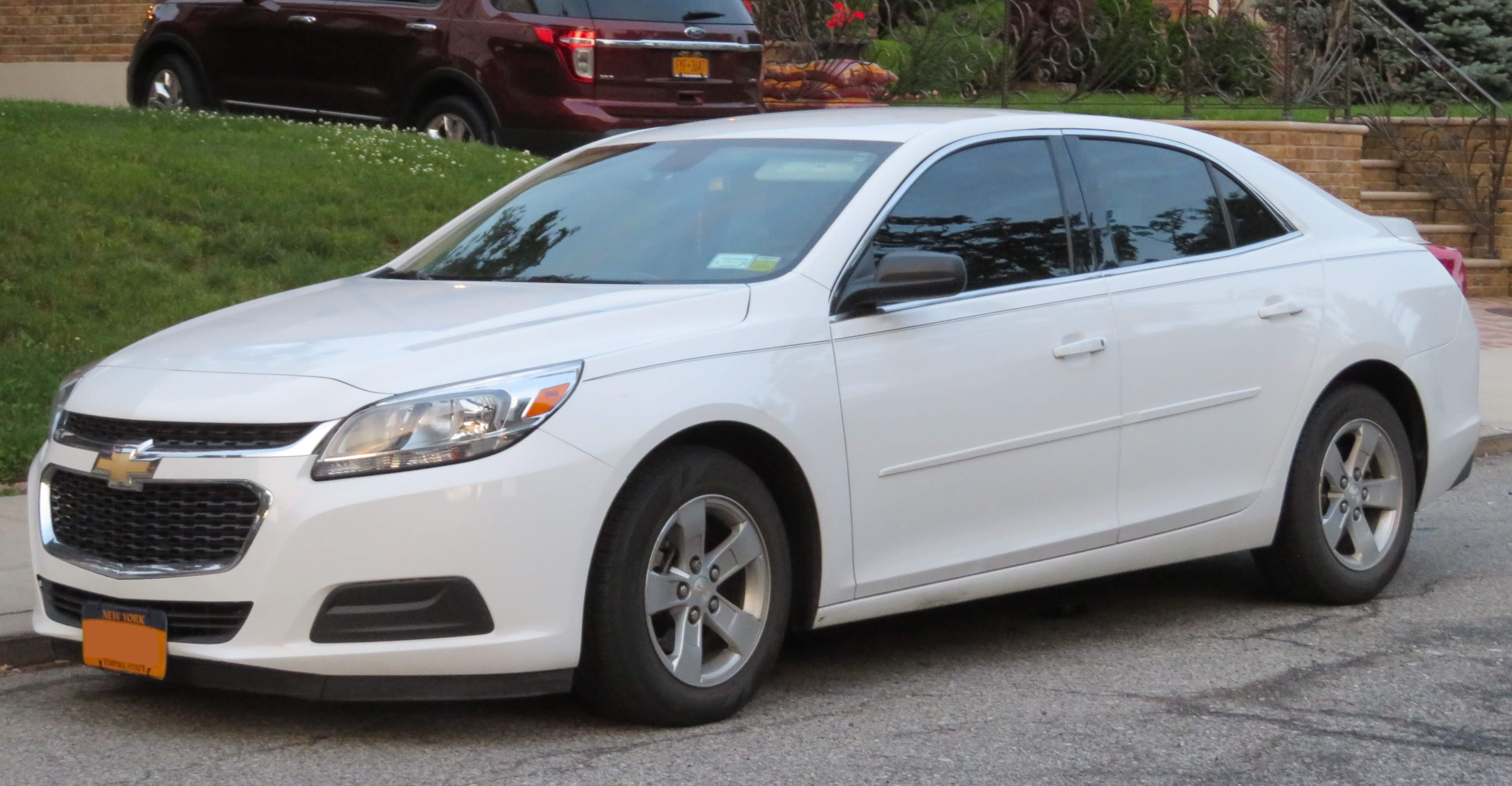
American facelift

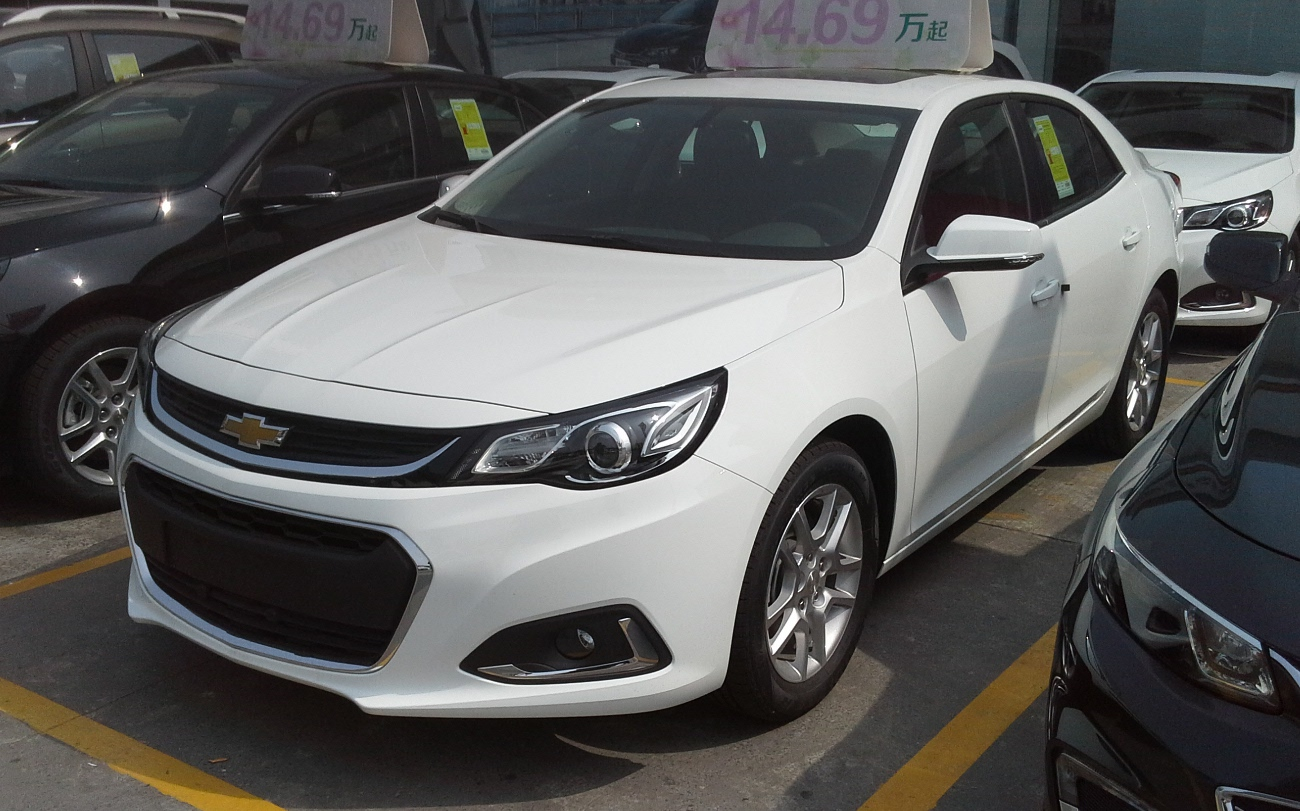
Chinese facelift

Eighteen months after its initial debut, the 2013 Malibu received a mild refresh. Changes included additional technology, improved fuel economy, and front-end styling that more closely matched the refreshed Chevrolet Traverse and the newly redesigned Chevrolet Impala. Minor changes were made to the center console to deliver a longer armrest said to be more comfortable, as well as a pair of cup holders and mobile-phone bins instead of the previous covered storage area. The Chinese model received a refreshed front end with revised headlamps.

Among the technology that Chevrolet debuted on the 2014 Malibu was a new six-speed transmission. Because the transmission was designed to reduce the energy required to pump transmission fluid, it contributed to fuel savings on the refreshed Malibu. In addition, for the first time in a non-hybrid GM vehicle, an engine stop/start system came standard with the 2.5 L engine. EPA fuel-economy estimates showed an improvement to 25/36 mpg city/highway, up from the 2013 model's 22/34 for the base 2.5 L engine. The 2014 Malibu went on sale in late 2013. There was no change in the South Korean market until 2016.

== Ninth generation (2016) ==
Ninth generation
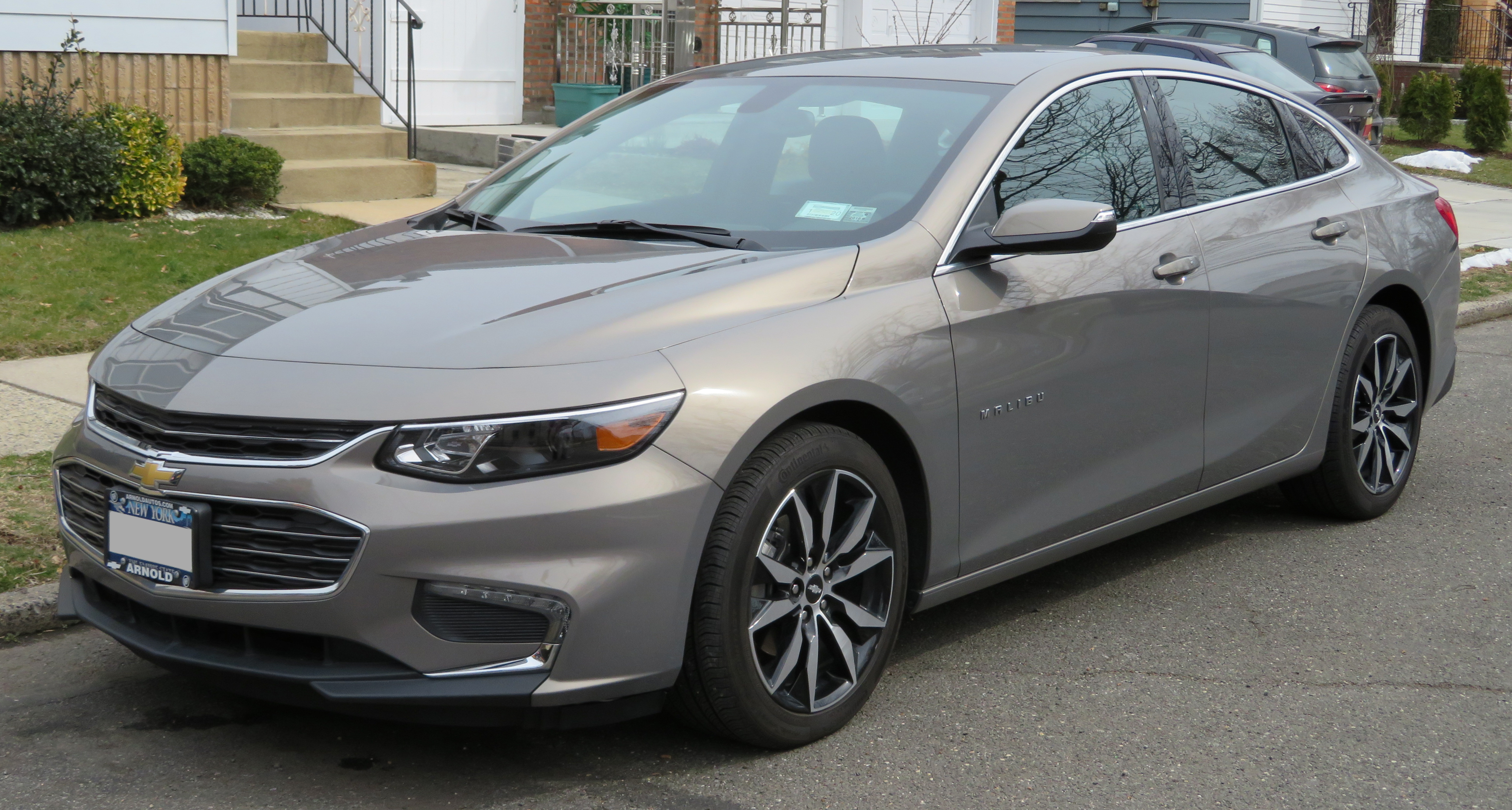
- 2017 Chevrolet Malibu LT (pre-facelift)

Overview
- Also called: Chevrolet Malibu XL (China)
- Production: 2015–2024 (US); 2016–2026 (China)
- Model years: 2016–2025 (North America); 2018–2021 (Philippines); 2016–2022 (Middle East and South Korea); 2017–2019 (Uzbekistan)
- Assembly: United States: Kansas City, Kansas (Fairfax Assembly); China: Shanghai (SAIC-GM); South Korea: Bupyeong (GM Korea); Uzbekistan: Tashkent (GM Uzbekistan); Azerbaijan: Hajigabul (AzerMash)
- Designer: Jaymer Starbody (2012)

Body and chassis
- Body style: 4-door sedan
- Layout: Front-engine, front-wheel-drive
- Platform: E2XX platform
- Related: Buick Regal; Holden Commodore (ZB); Opel Insignia; Vauxhall Insignia

Powertrain
- Engine: gasoline: 1.35 L EcoTec Turbo I3; 1.5 L EcoTec Turbo I4 (China: 535T); 2.0 L EcoTec Turbo l4; 2.0 L EcoTec Turbo l4 (China: 550T); 2.5 L LKW l4; hybrid: 1.8 L LKN Hybrid l4; diesel: 1.6 L LH7 Turbo Diesel I4
- Electric motor: 2 × 121 kW (165 PS; 162 bhp) GM Voltec integrated electric motors (Malibu Hybrid)
- Power output: 136 kW (185 PS; 182 bhp) (Malibu Hybrid)
- Transmission: 6-speed GM 6T45 automatic (2016–2022); 7-speed DCG DCT (2016–2018); 8-speed Aisin AWF8F45 automatic (2016–2018); 9-speed Hydra-Matic 9T50 automatic (2017–2025); GM Voltec 5ET50 (MKE) (2016–2019) Multi-mode two motor, electronic continuously-variable automatic transaxle (Hybrid model); GM CVT250 (MRG) CVT (2019–)
- Hybrid drivetrain: Power-split (Hybrid)
- Battery: 80-cell 1.5-kWh Li-ion

Dimensions
- Wheelbase: 111.4 in (2,830 mm)
- Length: 193.8 in (4,923 mm); 194.2 in (4,933 mm) (facelift 2019–2025)
- Width: 73.0 in (1,854 mm)
- Height: 57.3 in (1,455 mm); 58.1 in (1,476 mm) (Malibu XL)
- Curb weight: 3,086–3,457 lb (1,400–1,568 kg)

On April 1, 2015, Chevrolet unveiled a redesigned Malibu at the 2015 New York International Auto Show, which went on sale in late 2015 as a 2016 model. The updated Malibu featured a sleeker yet larger design, similar to the full-sized Impala. The wheelbase was increased by almost four inches, creating more interior space, yet the fuel efficiency is improved, as it is nearly 300 pounds lighter than the eighth-generation model. The 2016 Malibu was offered in four trims: L, LS, LT, and Premier (replacing the LTZ trim).

The Malibu features a new LFV Ecotec 1.5 L turbocharged engine that is standard, while a 2.0 L LTG turbocharged engine was offered as an optional feature. No six-cylinder engine is available. Other new features on the ninth-generation Malibu that were introduced for the 2016 model year include available OnStar 4G LTE in-vehicle connectivity, as well as available wireless phone charging, preventive safety technologies including ten standard airbags featuring forward collision avoidance system, rear cross traffic alerts, and an optional automatic parking assist. It features Forward Collision Alert with Following Distance Indicator, Adaptive Cruise Control with Front Automatic Braking, and Front Pedestrian Alert with last-second automatic braking. It also features start-stop ignition once the engine is at operating temperature and the brake is applied while the vehicle is stopped.

The 2016 Malibu featured a first for the automotive industry: a teen driver feature which allows parents to view their children's driving statistics, such as maximum speed and warning alerts. To operate the vehicle, a parent enables the feature with a PIN in the settings menu of the Malibu's MyLink system, which allows them to register their teen's key fob. The system's settings are turned on only to registered key fobs. This technology also mutes the radio until the seatbelts are buckled. The 2016 Malibu was also available with both Apple CarPlay and Android Auto capability; however, only one phone brand at any one time can be used.

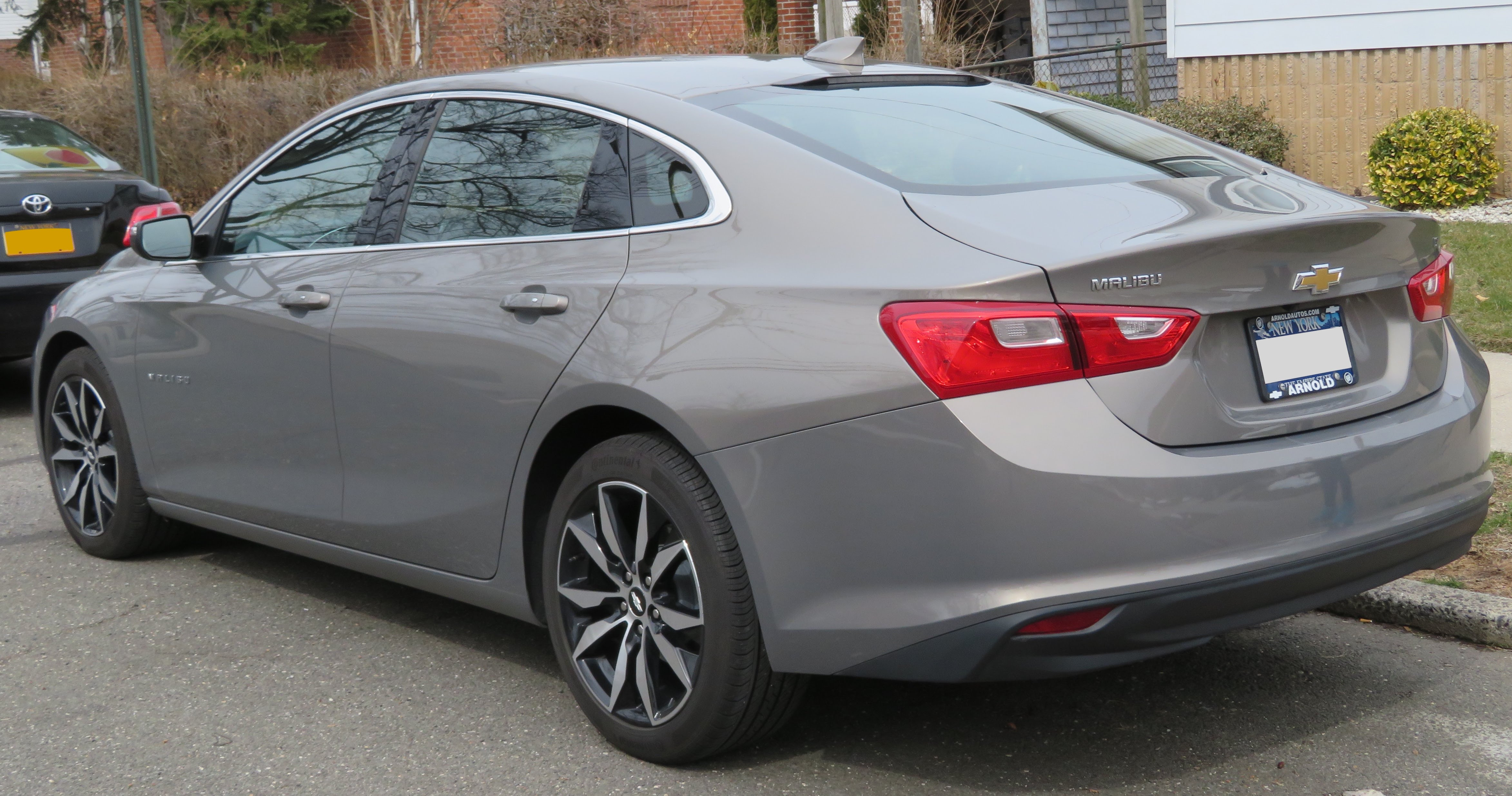
Rear view

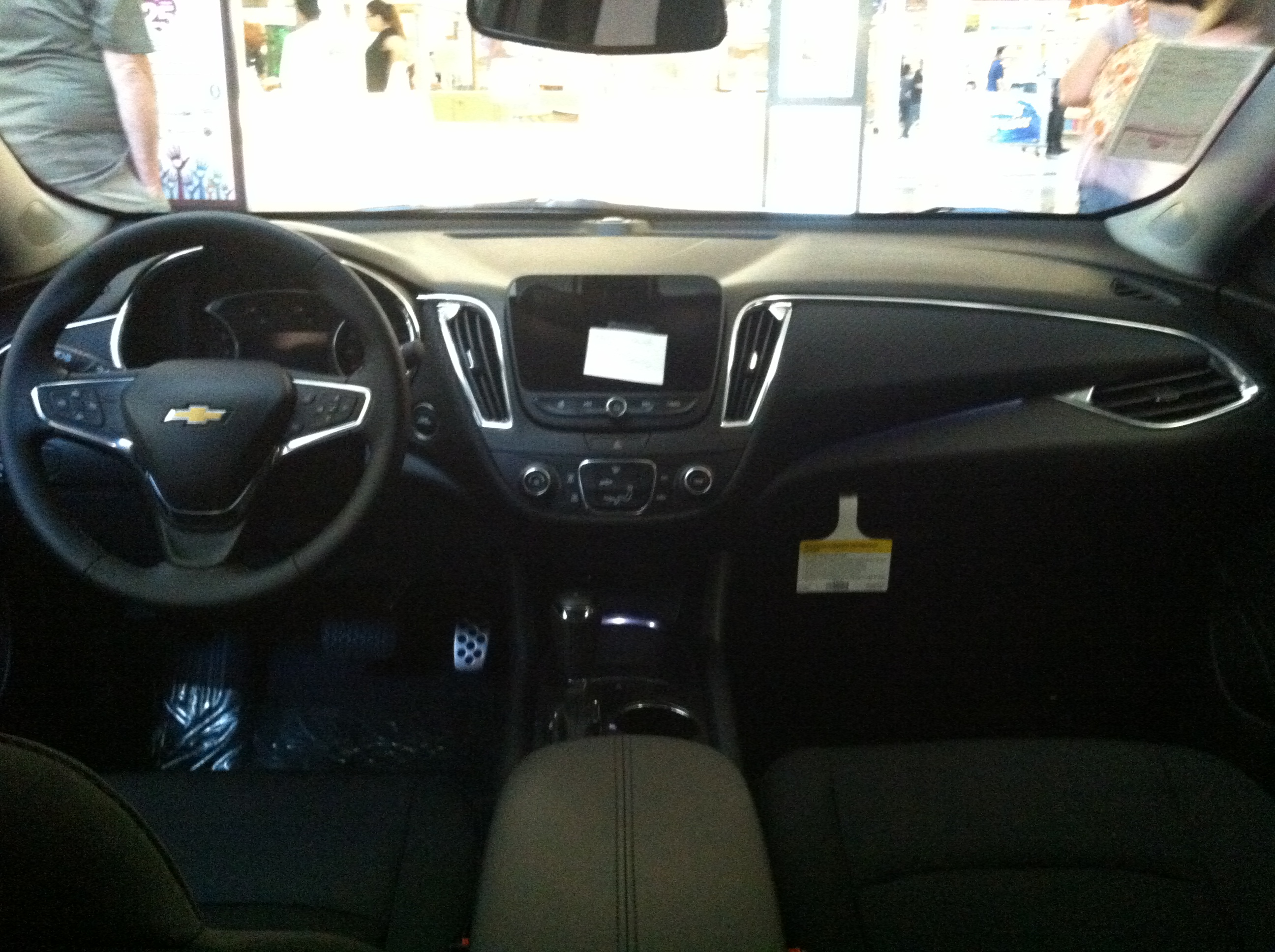
Interior

A few months ahead of the 2016 model arriving in dealerships, Chevrolet announced that the Malibu had hit a milestone, with more than 10 million sold worldwide since the nameplate was introduced in 1964. Outside of North America, the Malibu was also sold in China and South Korea. The pre-facelift model was also introduced in the Philippines in early 2018, and was sold there until its discontinuation in 2021; the facelift version never appeared in the Philippines.

For the 2017 model year, the 2.0-liter Ecotec turbocharged four-cylinder engine received a transmission upgrade from an eight-speed unit to a nine-speed unit, but the engine was no longer offered on the LT trim, making it exclusive to the Premier trim.

=== Hybrid ===
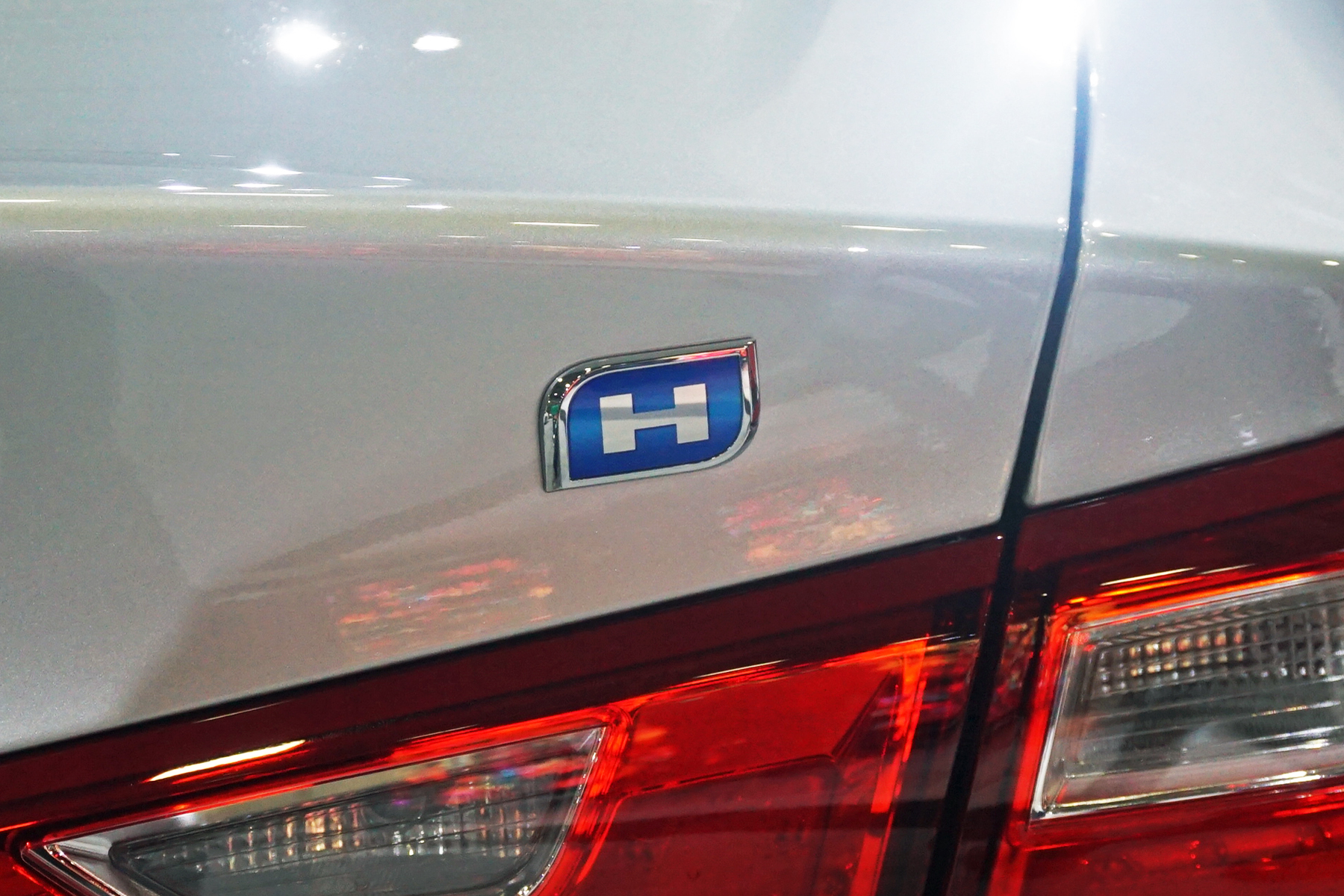
Chevrolet hybrid badge

The ninth-generation Malibu offered a full hybrid model for the first time, featuring a 1.8 L four-cylinder engine mated to a two-motor drive unit and electronically controlled, continuously variable automatic transaxle, providing additional power to assist the engine during acceleration for 182 horsepower of total system power. An Exhaust Gas Heat Recovery system allows the engine and cabin to warm up during winter conditions, while an 80-cell, 1.5 kWh lithium-ion battery pack provides electric power to the hybrid system, powering the Malibu Hybrid up to 55 mph (89 km/h) on electricity alone, while the gasoline-powered engine automatically comes on at higher speeds and loads to provide additional power. The Malibu Hybrid uses a transmission ("two motor drive unit" in GM terms) similar to the second-generation Chevrolet Volt, but a much smaller battery, no plug-in option, and a different engine.

Due to the discontinuation of the Chevrolet Volt and declining sales, the Malibu Hybrid was discontinued after 2019, leaving Chevrolet without hybrid vehicles in their North American lineup until the introduction of the Corvette E-Ray in 2023.

=== Engines ===
Type	Model years	Power	Torque	EPA-estimated fuel economy (city/highway/combined MPG)
1,827 cc (111.5 cu in) 1.8-liter LKN I4 Hybrid	2016–2019	124 hp (92 kW); Combined: 182 hp (136 kW) at 5000 rpm	129 lb⋅ft (175 N⋅m); Combined: 277 lb⋅ft (376 N⋅m) at 4750 rpm	47/46/46 (2016) 49/43/46 (2017–2019)
1,490 cc (91 cu in) 1.5-liter EcoTec I4	2016–2025	163 hp (122 kW) at 5600 rpm	184 lb⋅ft (249 N⋅m) at 2000–4000 rpm	27–29 / 35–36 / 30–32
1,998 cc (121.9 cu in) 2.0-liter EcoTec I4	2016–2022	250 hp (186 kW) at 5300 rpm	260 lb⋅ft (353 N⋅m) at 2000–5000 rpm	22 / 32–33 / 26
2,457 cc (149.9 cu in) 2.5-liter LKW I4	2016–2018	197 hp (147 kW) at 6200 rpm	187 lb⋅ft (253 N⋅m) at 4400 rpm	

=== 2019 mid-cycle refresh ===
Chevrolet updated the Malibu in 2018 for the 2019 model year. A new larger front grille, split by a chrome bar with the Chevrolet bowtie, dominates the front, while the rear change is less significant. The Premier trim adds LED headlamps while the other trims maintain halogen headlamps. A new RS trim was added for a sportier appearance, with a black grille, unique 18-inch wheels, and dual exhaust. The touchscreen was replaced with the eight-inch Chevrolet Infotainment 3 in the L/LS/RS/LT trims and Chevrolet Infotainment 3 Plus with HD screen in the Hybrid and Premier trims. Heated second-row seats are added to the Premier trim. The standard 1.5 L engine was now paired with a CVT instead of the 6-speed automatic transmission. Safety features were also improved for the 2019 Malibu, including Low Speed Forward Automatic Braking, IntelliBeam high-beam assist headlamps, and a semi-automated parking system. For 2019, the LT trim's Leather Package lost the Bose premium audio system, requiring buyers to upgrade to the range-topping Premier trim in order to opt for the Bose system.

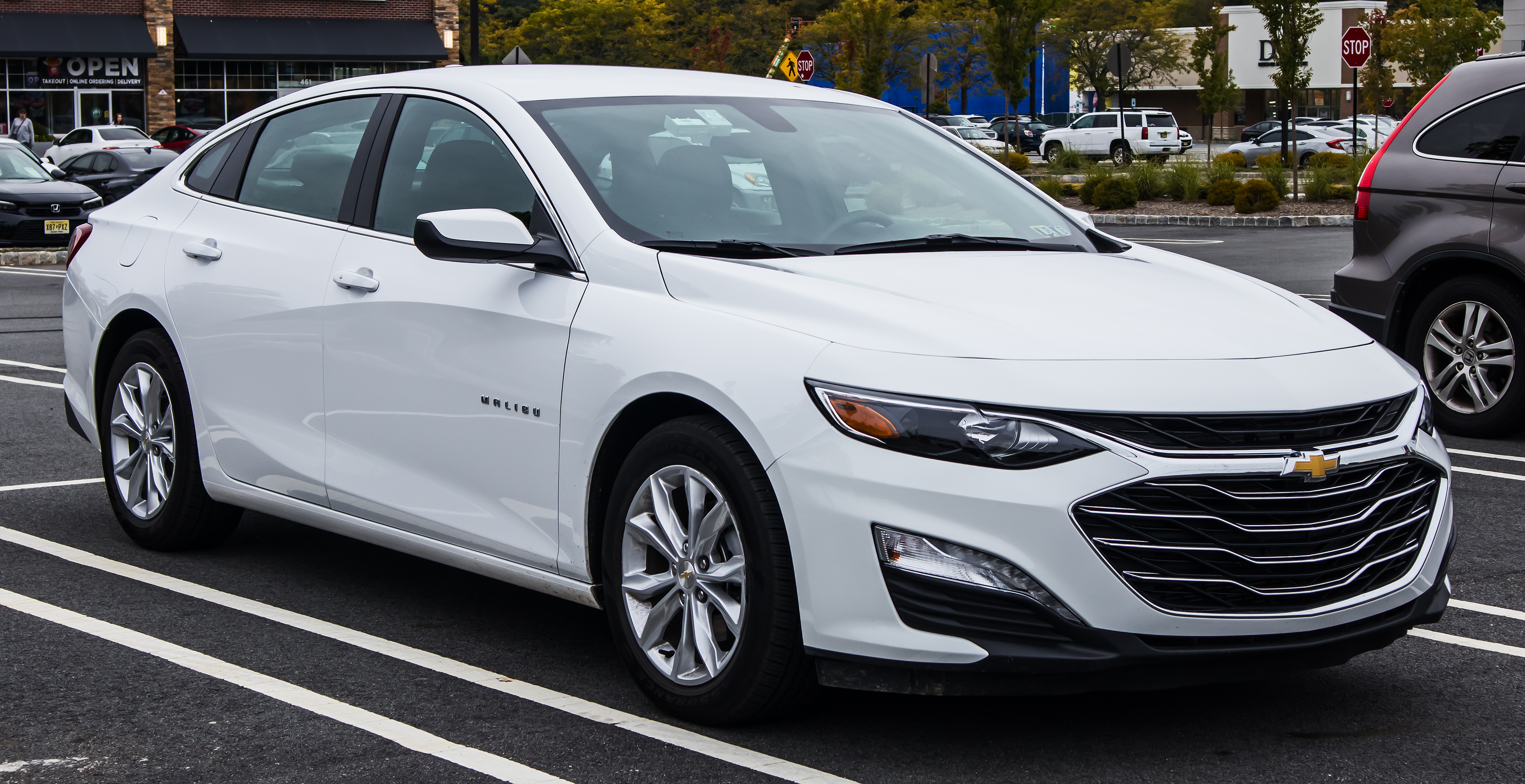
Chevrolet Malibu LT (US; facelift)

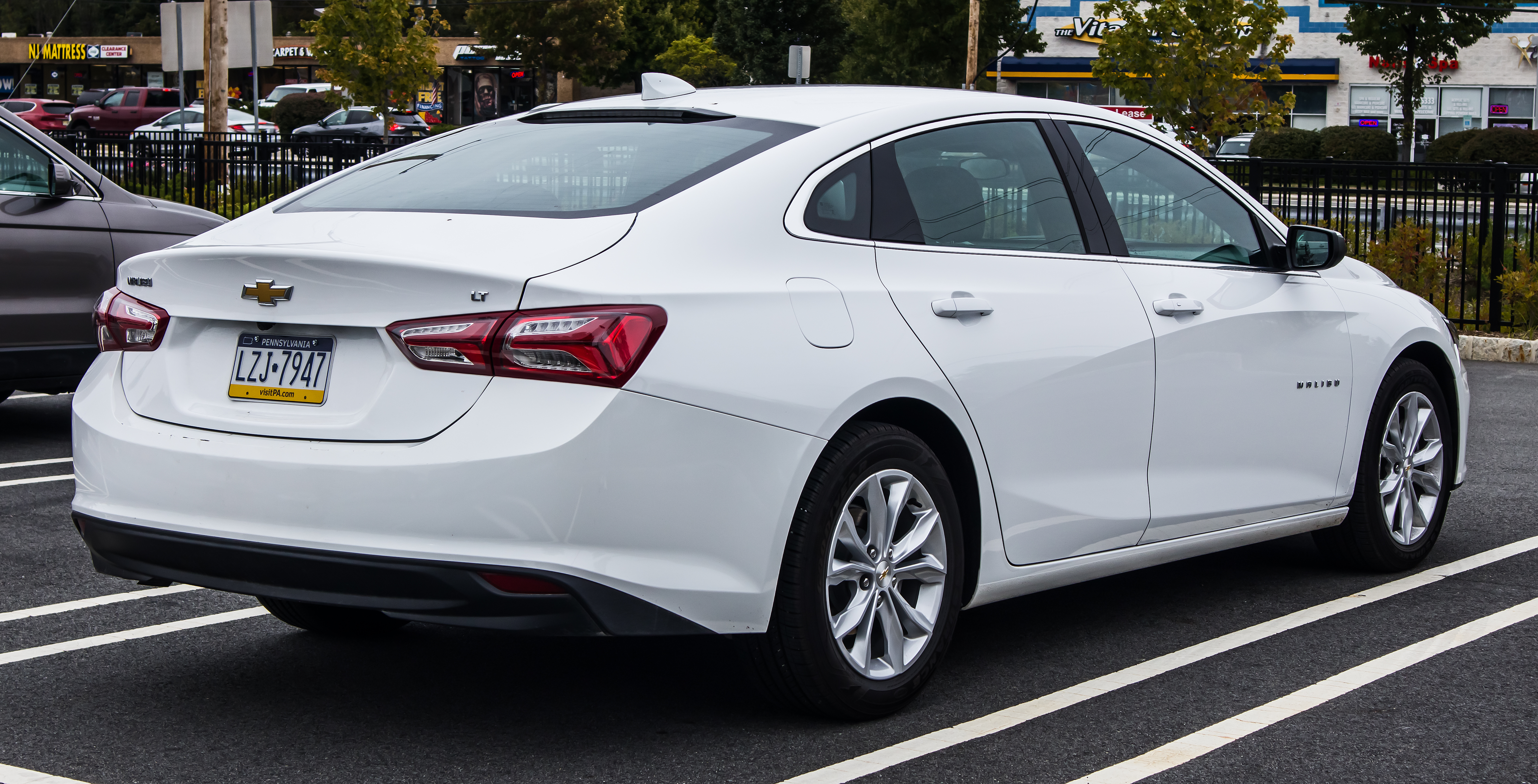
Chevrolet Malibu LT (US; facelift)

For the 2020 model year, the base L trim level received standard 16-inch aluminum-alloy wheels from the LS trim, replacing the previous sixteen-inch steel wheels with plastic covers. All trim levels received the eight-inch Chevrolet Infotainment 3 systems as standard equipment, and the previous seven-inch touchscreen unit was discontinued.

For the 2022 model year, the low-volume L trim was discontinued (as well as on all other Chevrolet vehicles that previously offered the L trim level), demoting the LS trim to base model status. The mechanical parking brake was also discontinued, replaced by an electronically operated parking brake on all models.

For the 2023 model year, the Premier trim was replaced by the 2LT trim, and the LT was no longer fitted with standard leather seats. The 2.0-liter engine was also discontinued.

In November 2024, Chevrolet ended production of the Malibu in North America without a replacement for their market. The Fairfax Assembly plant in Kansas City, where the Malibu was built, was retooled to build the Ultium-based second-generation Bolt, while production of the Cadillac XT4 ended in January 2025. The Malibu XL remained in production in China until August 2026, when Chevrolet exited the Chinese market entirely.

==== Engines ====
Type	Model years	Power at rpm	Torque at rpm
1,490 cc (91 cu in) 1.5-liter EcoTec Inline-4	2016–2025	163 bhp (122 kW) at 5600 rpm	184 lb⋅ft (249 N⋅m) at 2000–4000 rpm
1,998 cc (121.9 cu in) 2.0-liter EcoTec Inline-4	2016–2022	250 bhp (190 kW) at 5300 rpm	260 lb⋅ft (353 N⋅m) at 2000–5000 rpm
1,341 cc (81.8 cu in) 1.35-liter GM E-Turbo engine Inline-3	2019–2022	154 bhp (115 kW) at 5600 rpm	174 lb⋅ft (236 N⋅m) at 1500–4000 rpm
1,998 cc (121.9 cu in) 2.0-liter EcoTec Inline-4	2019–2022	233 bhp (174 kW) at 5000 rpm	258 lb⋅ft (350 N⋅m) at 1500–4000 rpm
1,598 cc (97.5 cu in) 1.6-liter LH7 turbo-diesel Inline-4	2019–2020	134 bhp (100 kW) at 3500–4000 rpm	236 lb⋅ft (320 N⋅m) at 2000–2250 rpm

=== Safety ===
The 2016 Malibu was awarded "Top Safety Pick+" by the Insurance Institute for Highway Safety (IIHS), when equipped with either or both Front Automatic Braking and City-Speed Front Automatic Breaking safety systems managed to avoid a collision in the 25 mph (40 km/h).

IIHS scores (2016)
Small overlap front (driver)	Good		
Small overlap front (passenger)	Marginal		
Moderate overlap front (original test)	Good		
Side (original test)	Good		
Side (updated test)	Poor		
Roof strength	Good		
Head restraints and seats	Good		
Headlights	Poor		
Front crash prevention: vehicle-to-vehicle	Superior	Advanced	Optional system
Child seat anchors (LATCH) ease of use	Marginal		

== Sales ==
Calendar year	United States	China	S. Korea
2000	207,376	—N/a	—N/a
2001	176,583	—N/a	—N/a
2002	169,000	—N/a	—N/a
2003	122,771	—N/a	—N/a
2004	179,806	—N/a	—N/a
2005	203,503	—N/a	—N/a
2006	163,853	—N/a	—N/a
2007	128,312	—N/a	—N/a
2008	178,253 (includes 3,118 hybrid)	—N/a	—N/a
2009	161,568 (inc. 4,162 hybrid)	—N/a	—N/a
2010	198,770 (inc. 405 hybrid)	—N/a	—N/a
2011	204,808 (inc. 24 hybrid)	—N/a	—N/a
2012	210,952 (inc. 16,664 hybrid)	51,926	
2013	200,594 (inc. 13,779 hybrid)	100,141	
2014	188,519 (inc. 1,018 hybrid)	125,547	
2015	194,854 (inc. 59 hybrid)	80,222	
2016	227,881 (inc. 4,335 hybrid)	85,180	
2017	185,857 (inc. 4,452 hybrid)	124,188	33,325
2018	144,542 (inc. 2,447 hybrid)	129,458	17,052
2019	131,917 (inc. 1,237 hybrid)	74,741	12,210
2020	102,651	45,662	6,548
2021	39,376	51,128	3,107
2022	115,467	33,396	1,509
2023	130,342	15,808	
2024	117,319	3,234	
2025	10,026	1,532	
