= Opel Vectra =

Compact executive car manufactured by Opel

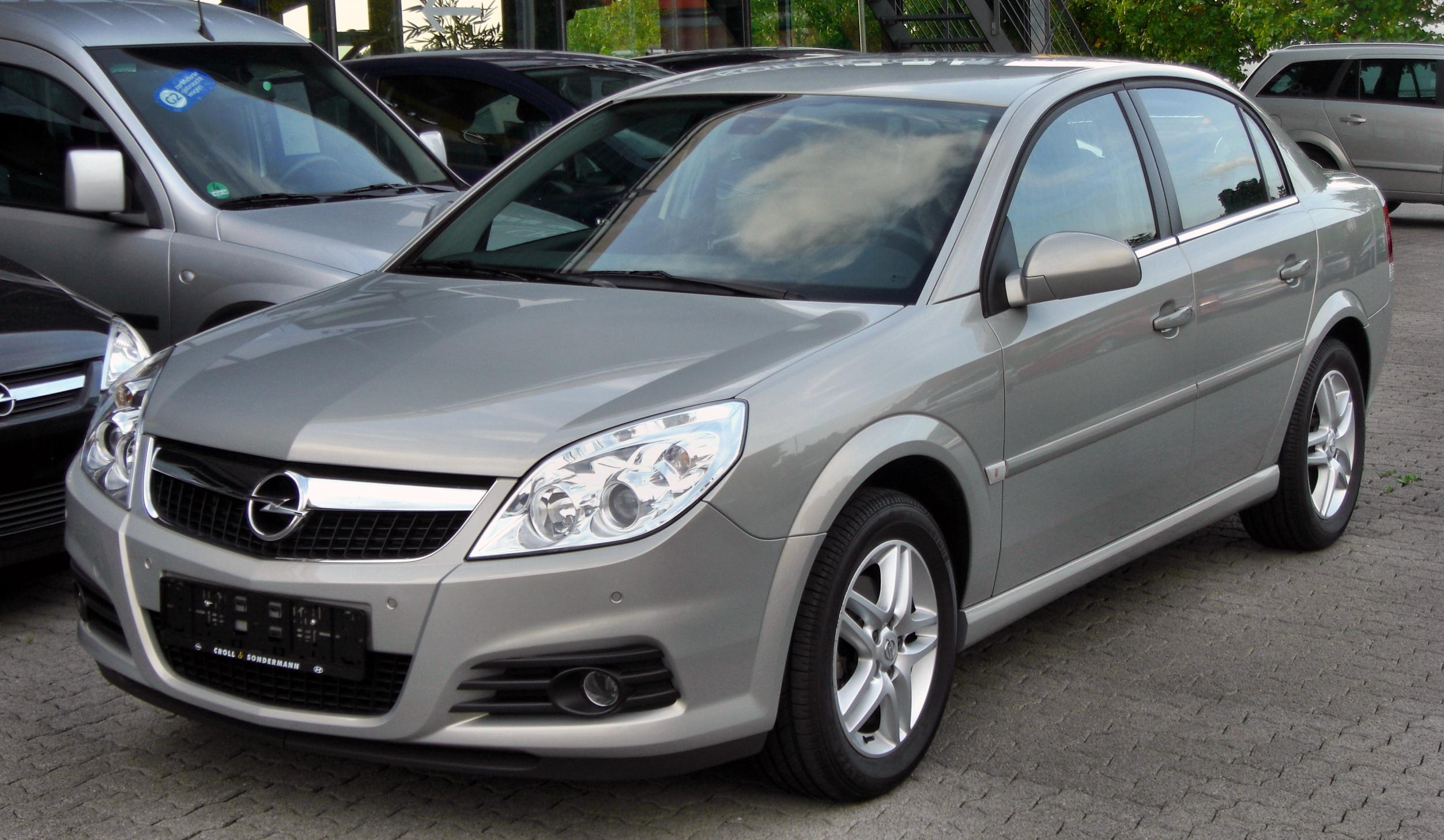
- Opel Vectra C (facelift)

Overview
- Manufacturer: Opel (General Motors)
- Also called: Chevrolet Vectra; Holden Vectra; Vauxhall Cavalier (1988–1995); Vauxhall Vectra (1995–2008)
- Production: October 1988 – July 2008

Body and chassis
- Class: Large family car (D-segment)
- Layout: Front-engine, front-wheel-drive/four-wheel-drive

Chronology
- Predecessor: Opel Ascona; Vauxhall Cavalier; Holden Camira / Holden Apollo (Holden Vectra)
- Successor: Opel Insignia

The Opel Vectra is a mid-size car (large family car) that was engineered and produced by the German automaker Opel from 1988 until 2008. Available in saloon, hatchback and estate (from model year 1997 onwards) body styles, the Vectra was also sold by the Vauxhall marque in the United Kingdom as the Vauxhall Cavalier from 1988 to 1995 and then as the Vauxhall Vectra from 1995 to 2008, and it was also sold by Holden in Australia as the Holden Vectra, by Chevrolet in Latin America as the Chevrolet Vectra.

The Vectra was introduced in October 1988 as a replacement for the Opel Ascona, and (alongside the larger Opel Signum) was later replaced in October 2008 by the new Opel Insignia, the nameplate spanning three generations and almost twenty-one years.

== Vectra A (1988–1995) ==
Vectra A
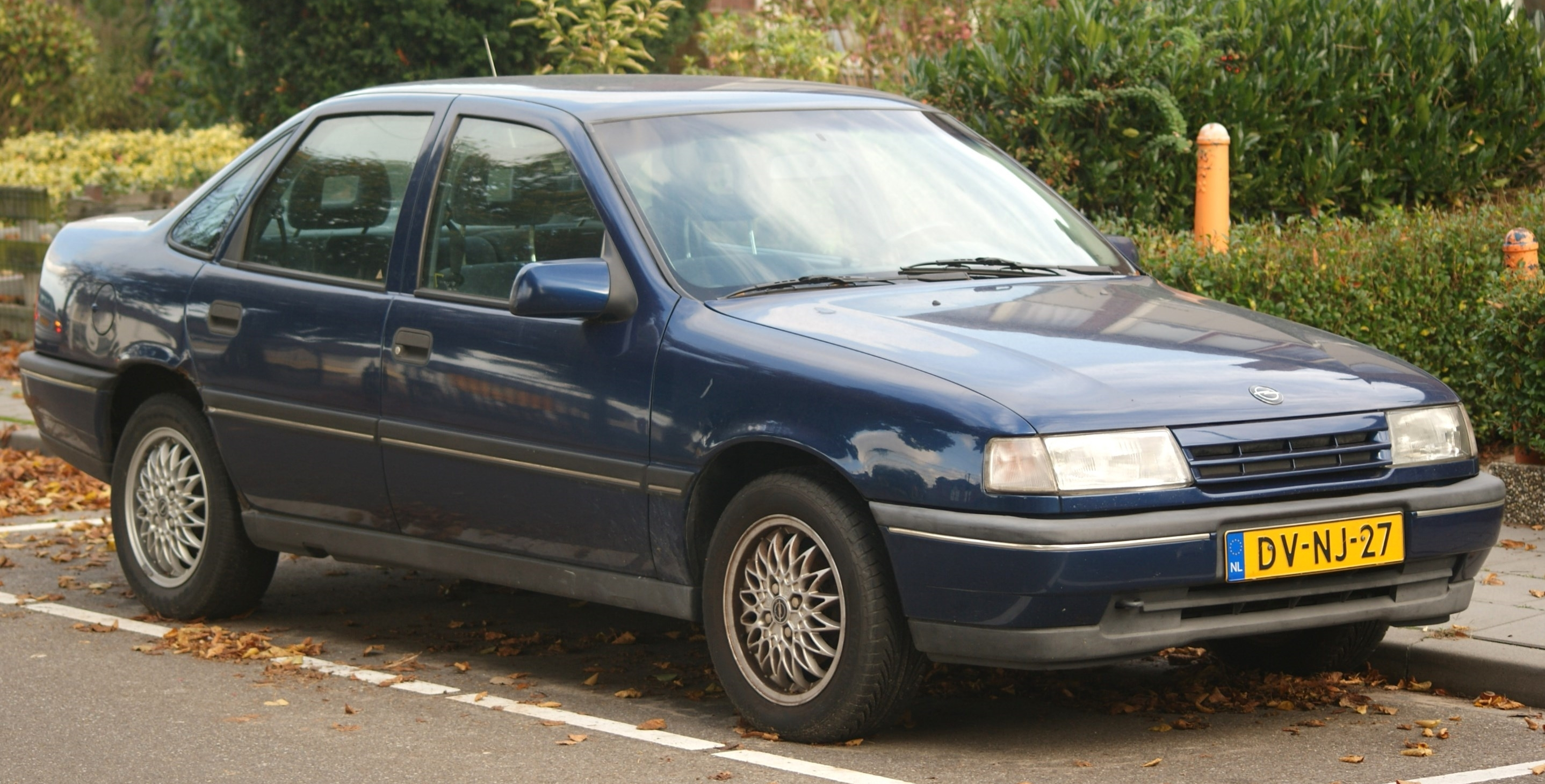
- (Pre-facelift)

Overview
- Also called: Chevrolet Vectra; Holden Vectra (New Zealand); Vauxhall Cavalier
- Production: October 1988 – October 1995
- Assembly: Germany: Eisenach; Germany: Rüsselsheim; Belgium: Antwerp; Brazil: São Caetano do Sul (1993–1996); Egypt: 6th of October City (GME; 1994–1996); England: Luton; Indonesia: Bekasi (GMBI); Turkey: Torbalı, İzmir Province (1992-1996); Venezuela: Caracas (General Motors Valencia); Yugoslavia: Kikinda (IDA-Opel)
- Designer: Wayne Cherry

Body and chassis
- Body style: 4-door notchback saloon; 5-door hatchback
- Platform: GM2900 platform
- Related: Opel Calibra; Saab 900 (NG)

Powertrain
- Engine: Petrol: 1.4 L 14NV I4; 1.6 L C16NZ/E16NZ/16SV/16LZ2/X16SZ I4; 1.8 L 18SV/C18SV/E18NVR/C18NZ I4; 2.0 L 20NE/C20NE/20SEH I4; 2.0 L 20XE/C20XE DOHC 16V I4; 2.0 L C20LET DOHC 16V turbo I4; 2.2 L C22NE I4 (Brazil); 2.5 L C25XE V6; Diesel: 1686 cc 4EE1 turbo I4; 1700 cc 17D/17DR I4
- Transmission: 5-speed manual (F10/5, F13/5, F16/5, F20/5); 6-speed Getrag manual (F28/6); 4-speed automatic

Dimensions
- Wheelbase: 2,600 mm (102.4 in)
- Length: 4,430 mm (174.4 in) (saloon); 4,350 mm (171.3 in) (hatch)
- Width: 1,700 mm (66.9 in)
- Height: 1,400 mm (55.1 in)
- Curb weight: 997–1,199 kg (2,198–2,643 lb) (4-cyl petrols)

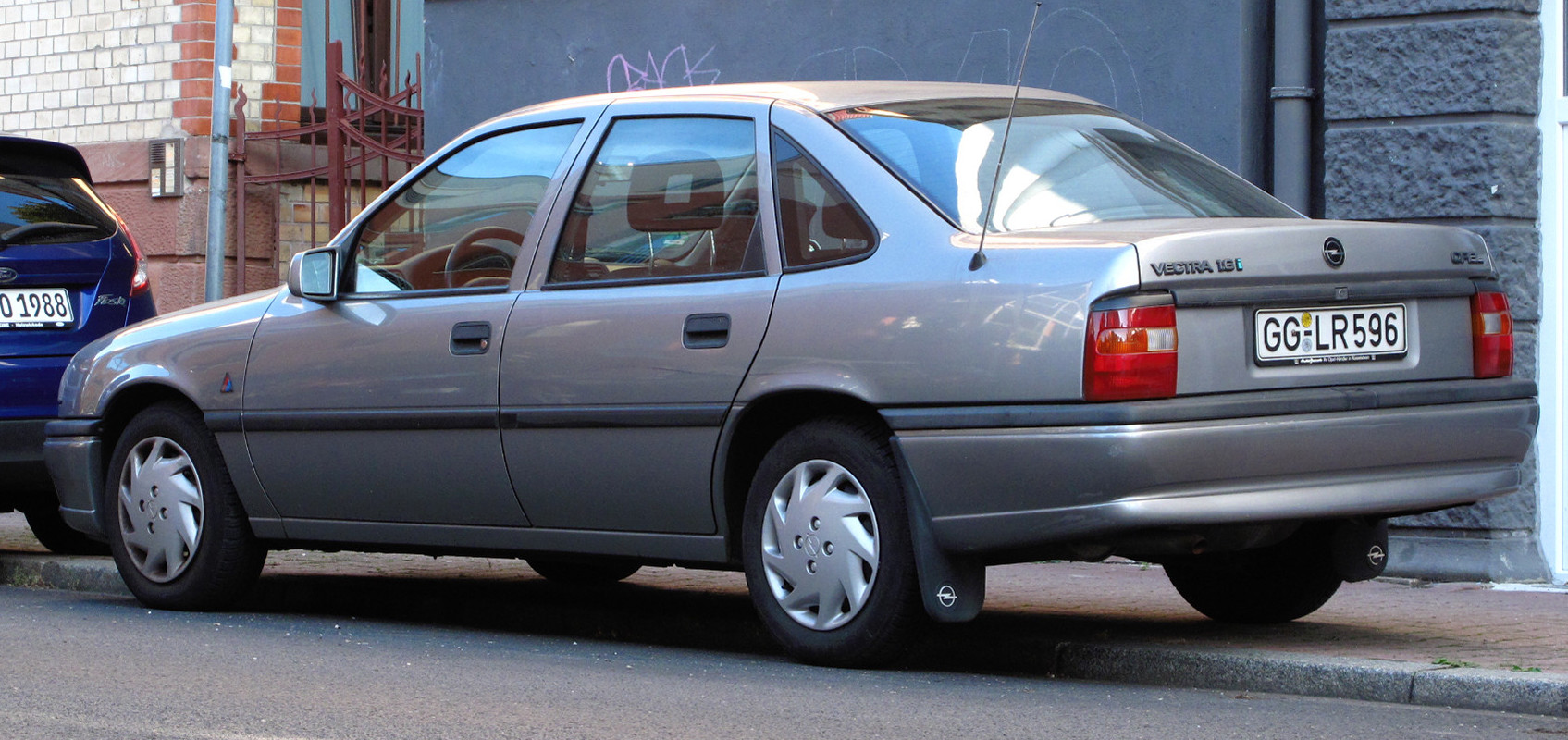
Saloon (pre-facelift)

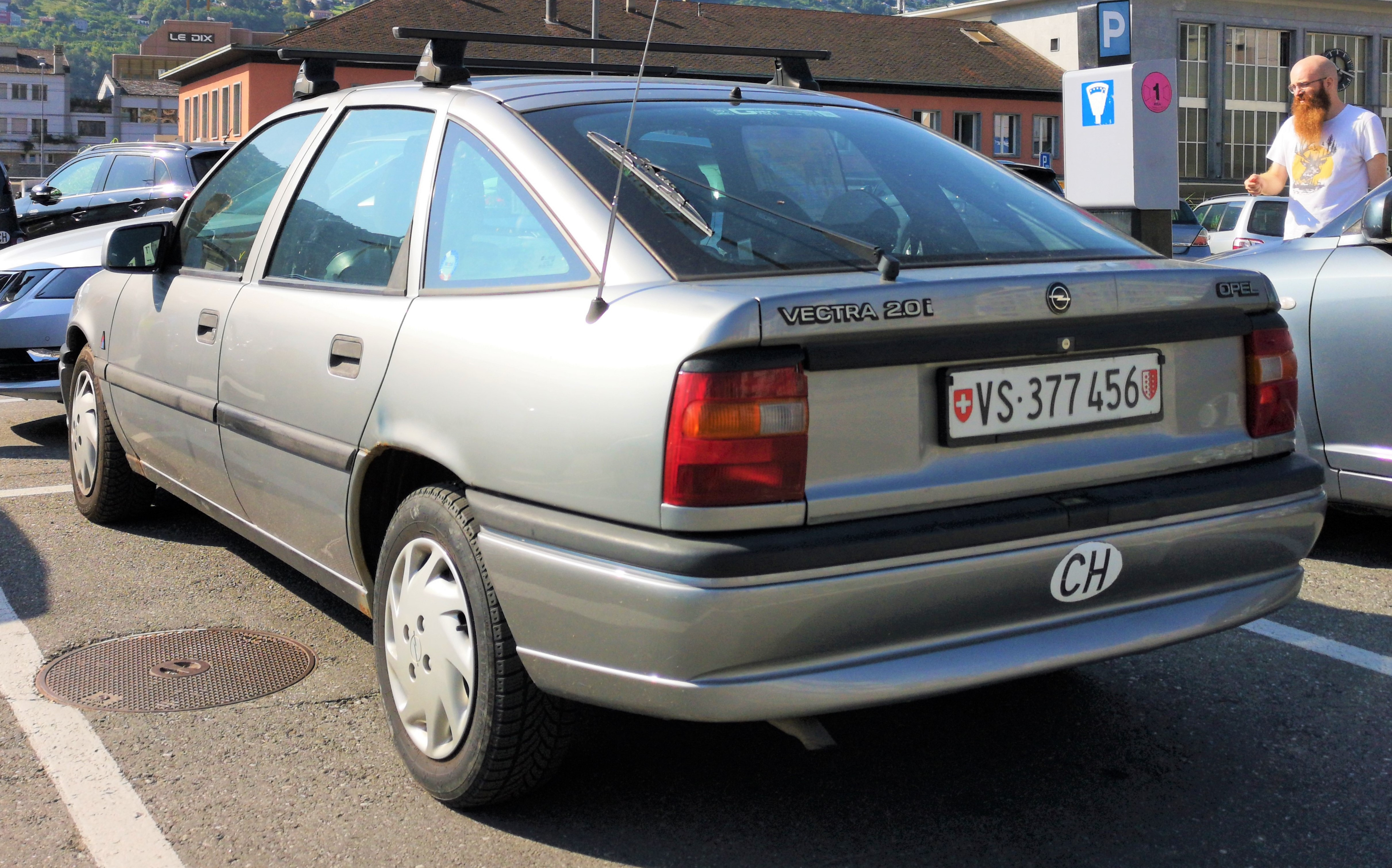
Hatchback (pre-facelift)

The first generation Vectra, known as the Vectra A, was introduced in October 1988 for the 1989 model year, as a four-door notchback saloon, replacing the Opel Ascona C. A five-door hatchback version arrived in March 1989, and a coupé based on the Vectra, called the Calibra, was introduced in the end of that year. Both cars were designed by Wayne Cherry, Opel’s design chief at the time. The Vectra name was coined by Manfred Gotta.

Vauxhall Motors, the British GM subsidiary that shared most of its models with Opel, did not use the "Vectra" model name - opting instead to continue the use of the Cavalier nameplate - effectively making the Vectra A a third-generation Cavalier when carrying Vauxhall branding. It was not until the introduction of the Vectra B into the United Kingdom in October 1995 that the Cavalier name was retired in favour of Vectra. However, left hand drive Opel Vectras were produced at Vauxhall's Luton plant for export to other European countries.

The 1989 Vectra came in Base, LS, GL, GLS, CD, and GT models, its sister model was the third-generation Cavalier. Engines ranged initially from a 75 PS (55 kW) 1.4 L to a 130 PS (96 kW) 2.0 L Family II. The top-of-the-line Vectra 2000 16V arrived in September 1989. Its sixteen valve version of the 2.0 L engine produces 150 PS (110 kW) and was only available with the sedan bodywork, with available four-wheel drive.

The sixteen-valve engine also appeared in GT (GSi in some markets) models after the facelift, now mainly as a hatchback. Two four-wheel drive versions were added to the lineup in January 1989, with either of the 2-litre engines, and in September 1992 the car received a limited edition turbocharged version with 204 PS (150 kW). In 1994, the 4x4 turbo version of the Vectra was used as the Safety Car in Formula One, where it was deployed at the San Marino Grand Prix.

The 1.4-litre engine was not available in all markets, and even then, it was generally only available in basic trims (Base/L in United Kingdom, LS/GL in Europe). In markets as Italy, where smaller engines were favored by the taxation system, a better equipped 1.4 GLS was also offered. With the introduction of Euro I emissions regulations, the carburetted 1.4 L engine was replaced by a fuel injected 1.6 L engine with the same output - albeit at lower revs, and greater torque - for most markets.

A 2.5 L V6 engine appeared towards the later stages of the Vectra's life, developing 170 PS (125 kW), turning the car into a relaxed motorway cruiser rather than giving it sporty pretensions. There were a choice of two diesel engines; one was an Isuzu 1.7 L 4EE1 inline-four unit, in both naturally aspirated and turbocharged form (1686 cc), this one capable of achieving 82 PS (60 kW), and an Opel designed 1.7 "low blow" turbodiesel (1699 cc), and naturally aspirated diesel unit, delivering 57 to 60 PS (42 to 44 kW).

The front suspension was fully independent, with MacPherson struts, pressed steel lower control arms, and an anti-roll bar. The front suspension, together with the major mechanicals (engine and transmission) is remotely mounted on a front subframe. On front wheel drive models, the rear suspension is semi independent, consisting of a torsion beam linked to trailing arms, with double conical coil springs and direct acting telescopic hydraulic shock absorbers, with certain models also having an anti roll bar.

On the four wheel drive GSi, 4x4 and Turbo models, the rear suspension is a subframe mounted fully independent design, with semi trailing arms, double conical coil springs, direct acting gas assisted telescopic shock absorbers, and an anti roll bar. Steering gear is a rack and pinion-type (manual or power assisted, depending on model), mounted on the bulkhead (firewall), with a telescopically deformable steering column.

=== Facelift (1992) ===
The Vectra also received a refresh in September 1992. The range received new front grilles and a black plastic strip above the rear taillamps, along with an upgrade to the structure for improved crashworthiness. Airbags became available onwards from 1993.

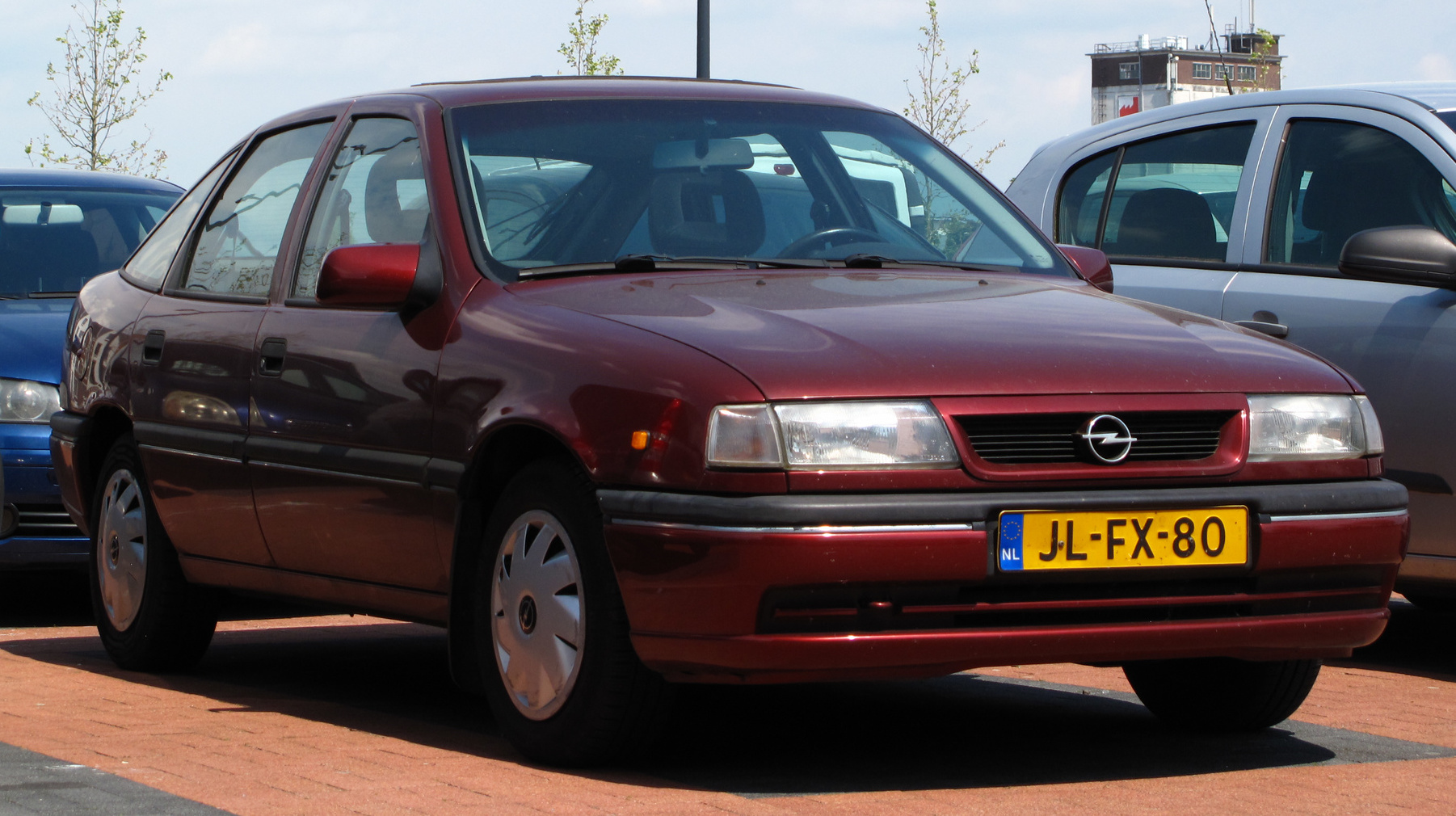
Hatchback (facelift)

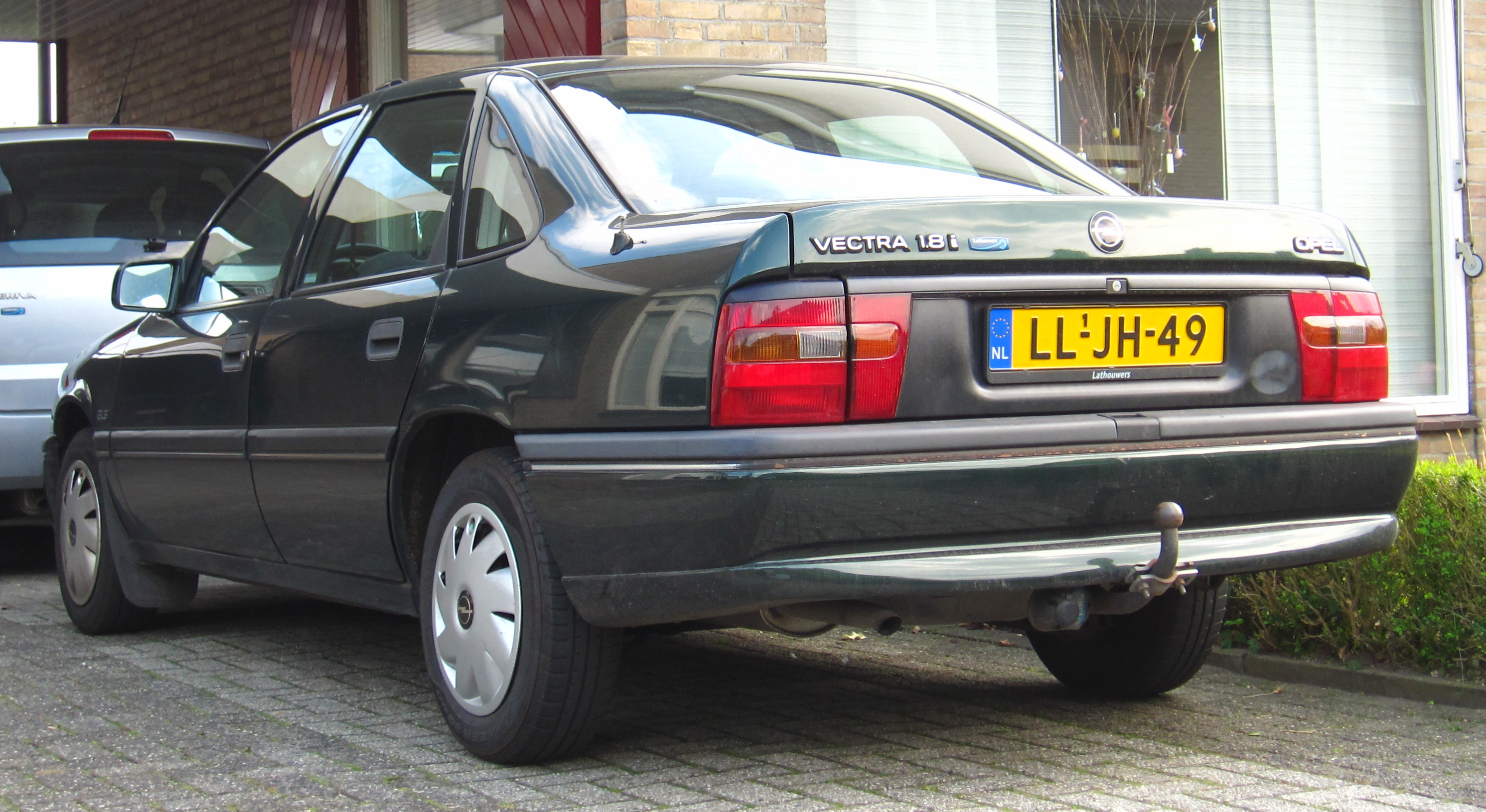
Saloon (facelift)

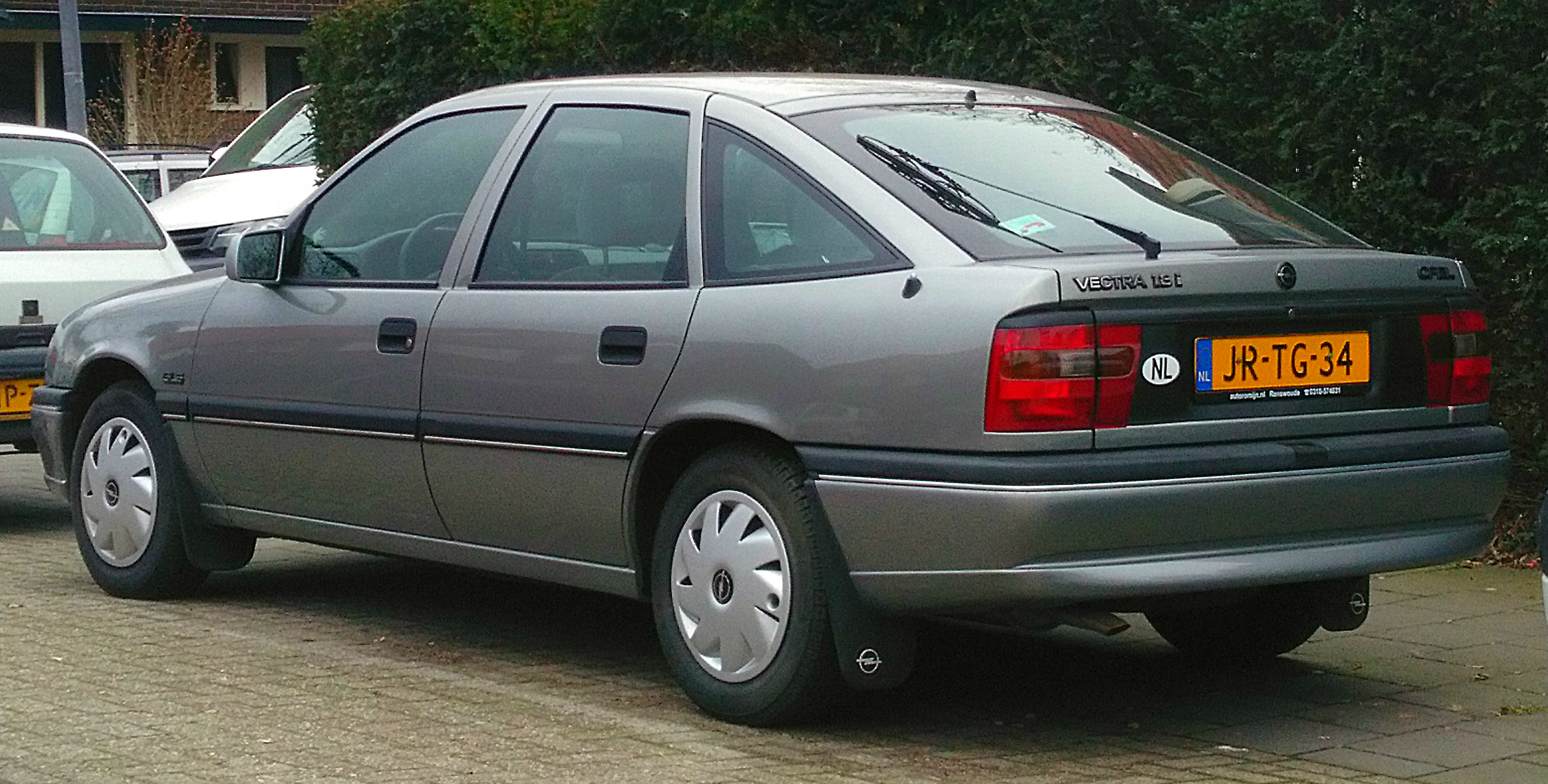
Hatchback (facelift)

In New Zealand, the Vectra A was offered initially as an Opel between 1989 and 1994, but it wore Holden badges between 1994 and 1996 until the introduction of the Vectra B. It was not sold in Australia, where Holden instead offered a rebadged Toyota Camry called Apollo until 1997. In Japan, the Vectra (and Omega) were the first Opels to be distributed by Isuzu Motors Ltd. rather than long standing importer Toho Motors (東邦モーターズ), beginning in July 1989.

In Egypt, the Opel Vectra A was not introduced until 1994 through GM Egypt dealerships, and started production in the end of 1994 by GM Egypt through the beginning of 1996, with a range of 1.6 GL, 2.0 GL trim and 2.0 GLS trim and only Saloon body style boosting strong sales during this short run. This was similar to the Opel Kadett.

=== Chevrolet Vectra (Brazil) ===
In Brazil, the Chevrolet badged Vectra A was not introduced until 1993, when it replaced the top versions of Chevrolet Monza, a restyled version of the Ascona C. The first Brazilian model had two engine options: 2.0 8 valve, for the GLS and CD versions and the 2.0 16 valve with 150 hp imported from Germany, the later only available for the GSI version. The assembly of the Vectra A goes until 1996, when the Vectra B was launched. Its production was made from CKD.

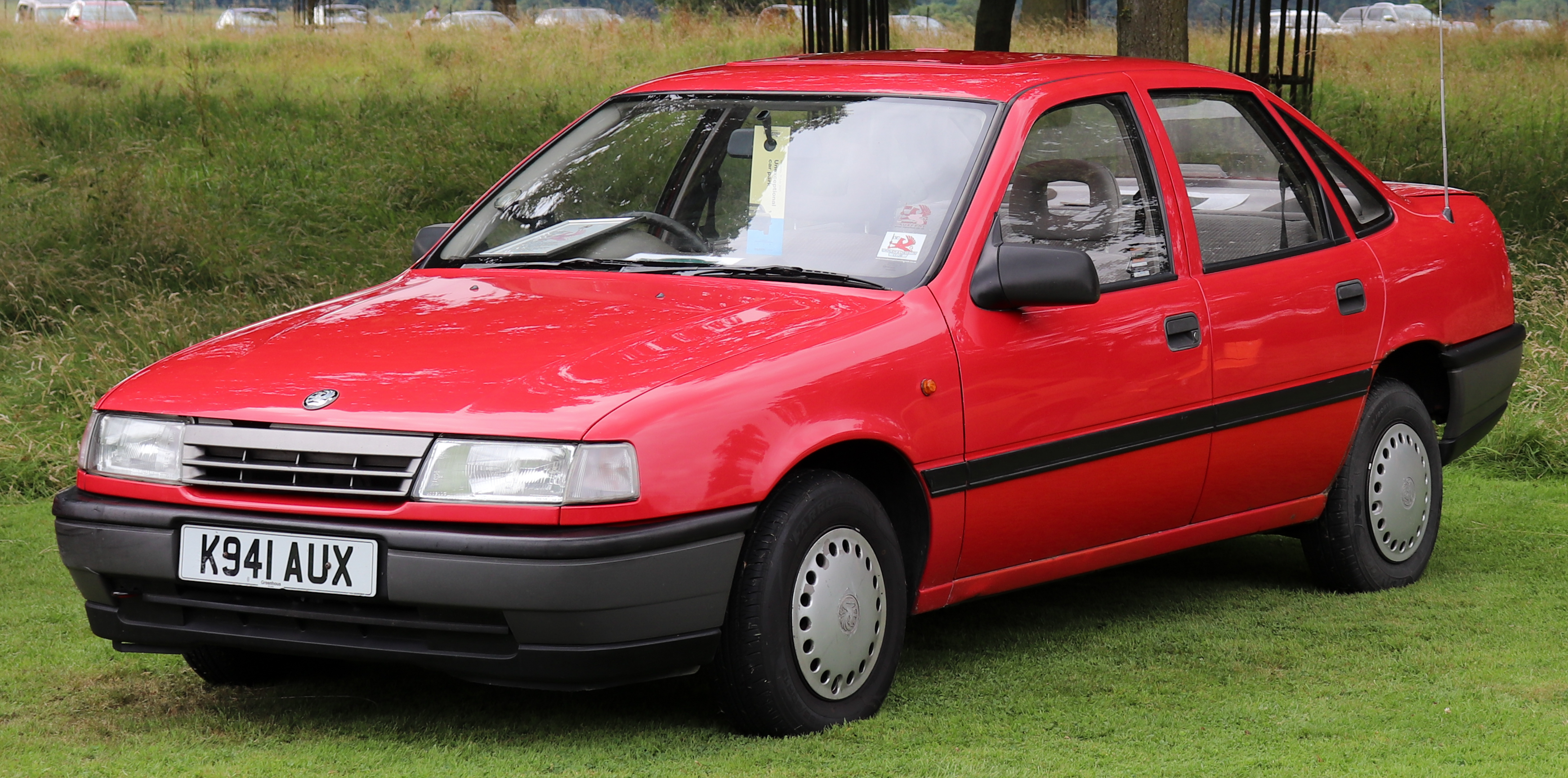
Vauxhall Cavalier (pre-facelift)

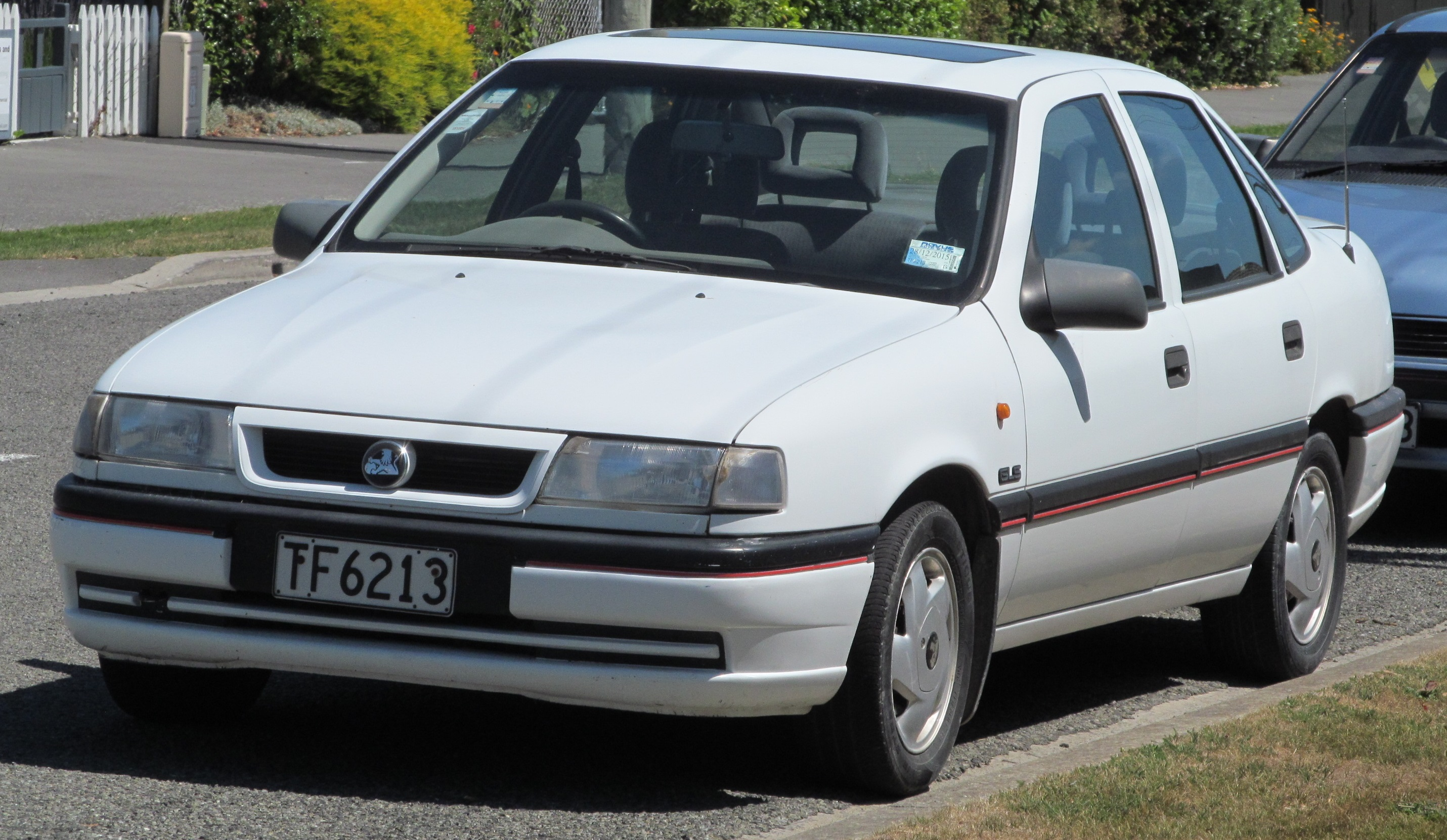
Holden Vectra (facelift)

=== Engines ===
Engine model	Displ.	Power	Torque	Fueling system	Valvetrain	Top speed
14NV	1.4 L	55 kW (75 PS; 74 hp) at 5,600 rpm	108 N⋅m (80 lb⋅ft) at 3,000 rpm	Carburettor	SOHC	176 km/h (109 mph)
16SV	1.6 L	60 kW (82 PS; 80 hp) at 5,200 rpm	130 N⋅m (96 lb⋅ft) at 2,600 rpm	Carburettor	SOHC	178 km/h (111 mph)
C16NZ(2)	1.6 L	55 kW (75 PS; 74 hp) at 5,200 rpm	127 N⋅m (94 lb⋅ft) at 2,600 rpm	SPFI	SOHC	176 km/h (109 mph)
E16NZ	1.6 L	55 kW (75 PS; 74 hp) at 5,200 rpm	125 N⋅m (92 lb⋅ft) at 2,600 rpm	SPFI	SOHC	176 km/h (109 mph)
X16SZR	1.6 L	52 kW (71 PS; 70 hp) at 5,000 rpm	128 N⋅m (94 lb⋅ft) at 2,800 rpm	SPFI	SOHC	176 km/h (109 mph)
18SV	1.8 L	66 kW (90 PS; 89 hp) at 5,400 rpm	148 N⋅m (109 lb⋅ft) at 2,800 rpm	Carburettor	SOHC	183 km/h (114 mph)
E18NVR	1.8 L	65 kW (88 PS; 87 hp) at 5,400 rpm	143 N⋅m (105 lb⋅ft) at 2,800 rpm	Carburettor	SOHC	182 km/h (113 mph)
C18NZ	1.8 L	66 kW (90 PS; 89 hp) at 5,400 rpm	145 N⋅m (107 lb⋅ft) at 3,000 rpm	SPFI	SOHC	183 km/h (114 mph)
C20NEF	2.0 L	74 kW (101 PS; 99 hp) at 5,200 rpm	158 N⋅m (117 lb⋅ft) at 2,600 rpm	MPFI	SOHC	
20NE	2.0 L	85 kW (116 PS; 114 hp) at 5,200 rpm	175 N⋅m (129 lb⋅ft) at 2,600 rpm	MPFI	SOHC	198 km/h (123 mph)
C20NE	2.0 L	85 kW (116 PS; 114 hp) at 5,200 rpm	170 N⋅m (125 lb⋅ft) at 2,600 rpm	MPFI	SOHC	198 km/h (123 mph)
20SEH	2.0 L	95 kW (129 PS; 127 hp) at 5,600 rpm	180 N⋅m (133 lb⋅ft) at 4,600 rpm	MPFI	SOHC	206 km/h (128 mph)
C22NE	2.2 L	103 kW (140 PS; 138 hp) at 5,200 rpm	207 N⋅m (153 lb⋅ft) at 2,600 rpm	MPFI	SOHC	202 km/h (126 mph)
20XEJ	2.0 L	110 kW (150 PS; 148 hp) at 6,000 rpm	196 N⋅m (145 lb⋅ft) at 4,800 rpm	MPFI	DOHC	217 km/h (135 mph)
C20XE	2.0 L	110 kW (150 PS; 148 hp) at 6,000 rpm	196 N⋅m (145 lb⋅ft) at 4,800 rpm	MPFI	DOHC	217 km/h (135 mph)
X20XEV	2.0 L	100 kW (136 PS; 134 hp) at 5,600 rpm	185 N⋅m (136 lb⋅ft) at 4,000 rpm	MPFI	DOHC	210 km/h (130 mph)
C20LET	2.0 L	150 kW (204 PS; 201 hp) at 5,600 rpm	280 N⋅m (207 lb⋅ft) at 2,400 rpm	MPFI, Turbo	DOHC	245 km/h (152 mph)
C25XE	2.5 L	125 kW (170 PS; 168 hp) at 6,000 rpm	227 N⋅m (167 lb⋅ft) at 4,200 rpm	MPFI	DOHC	233 km/h (145 mph)
17D	1.7 L	42 kW (57 PS; 56 hp) at 4,600 rpm 44 kW (60 PS; 59 hp) at 4,600 rpm	105 N⋅m (77 lb⋅ft) at 2,400–2,600 rpm	Bosch injection pump	SOHC	152 km/h (94 mph)
17DR	1.7 L	44 kW (60 PS; 59 hp) at 4,600 rpm	105 N⋅m (77 lb⋅ft) at 2,400–2,600 rpm	Bosch injection pump	SOHC	152 km/h (94 mph)
TC4EE1	1.7 L	60 kW (82 PS; 80 hp) at 4,400 rpm	168 N⋅m (124 lb⋅ft) at 2,400 rpm	Bosch injection pump	SOHC	176 km/h (109 mph)

== Vectra B (1995–2002) ==
Vectra B
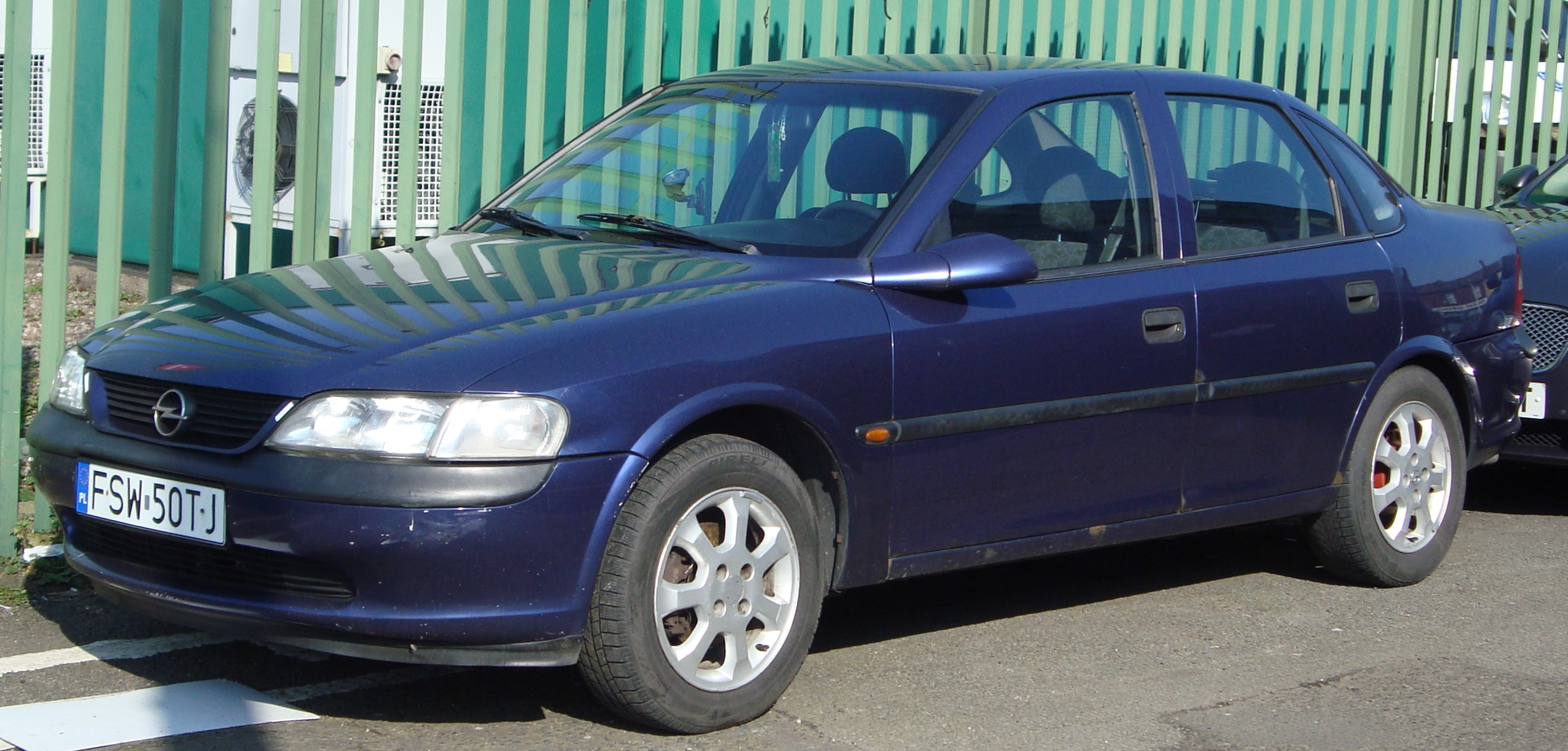
- Pre-facelift

Overview
- Also called: Chevrolet Vectra; Holden Vectra; Vauxhall Vectra
- Production: October 1995 – March 2002
- Assembly: Australia (1998–1999): Adelaide, South Australia (Elizabeth); Belgium: Antwerp (Opel Antwerp plant); Brazil (1996–2005): São Caetano do Sul (GM em São Caetano); Egypt (1998–2005): 6th of October City (GME); England: Luton (Luton car assembly plant); Germany: Rüsselsheim; Taiwan (1997–2000): Xinzhuang District (Chinese Automobile Co., Ltd.); Turkey: Torbalı, İzmir (GM Türkiye Ltd., 1996-2002)
- Designer: Hans Seer

Body and chassis
- Body style: 4-door saloon; 5-door hatchback; 5-door estate
- Platform: GM2900 platform
- Related: Saturn L-Series; Saab 9-5 (first generation)

Powertrain
- Engine: Petrol: 1.6 L 16LZ2 I4; 1.6 L X16SZR I4; 1.6 L X16XEL I4; 1.8 L X18XE I4; 2.0 L 20NEJ I4; 2.0 L X20XEV I4; 2.2 L C22SEL I4; 2.2 L Z22SE I4; 2.5 L X25XE/XEI V6; 2.6 L Y26SE V6; Diesel: 1.7 L Circle L I4; 2.0 L DTi I4; 2.2 L DTi I4
- Transmission: 4-speed automatic; 5-speed manual

Dimensions
- Wheelbase: 2,640 mm (103.9 in)
- Length: 4,480 mm (176.4 in) (saloon/hatchback); 4,490 mm (176.8 in) (estate)
- Width: 1,710 mm (67.3 in)
- Height: 1,420 mm (55.9 in)
- Curb weight: 1,270–1,325 kg (2,800–2,921 lb)

Pre-facelift

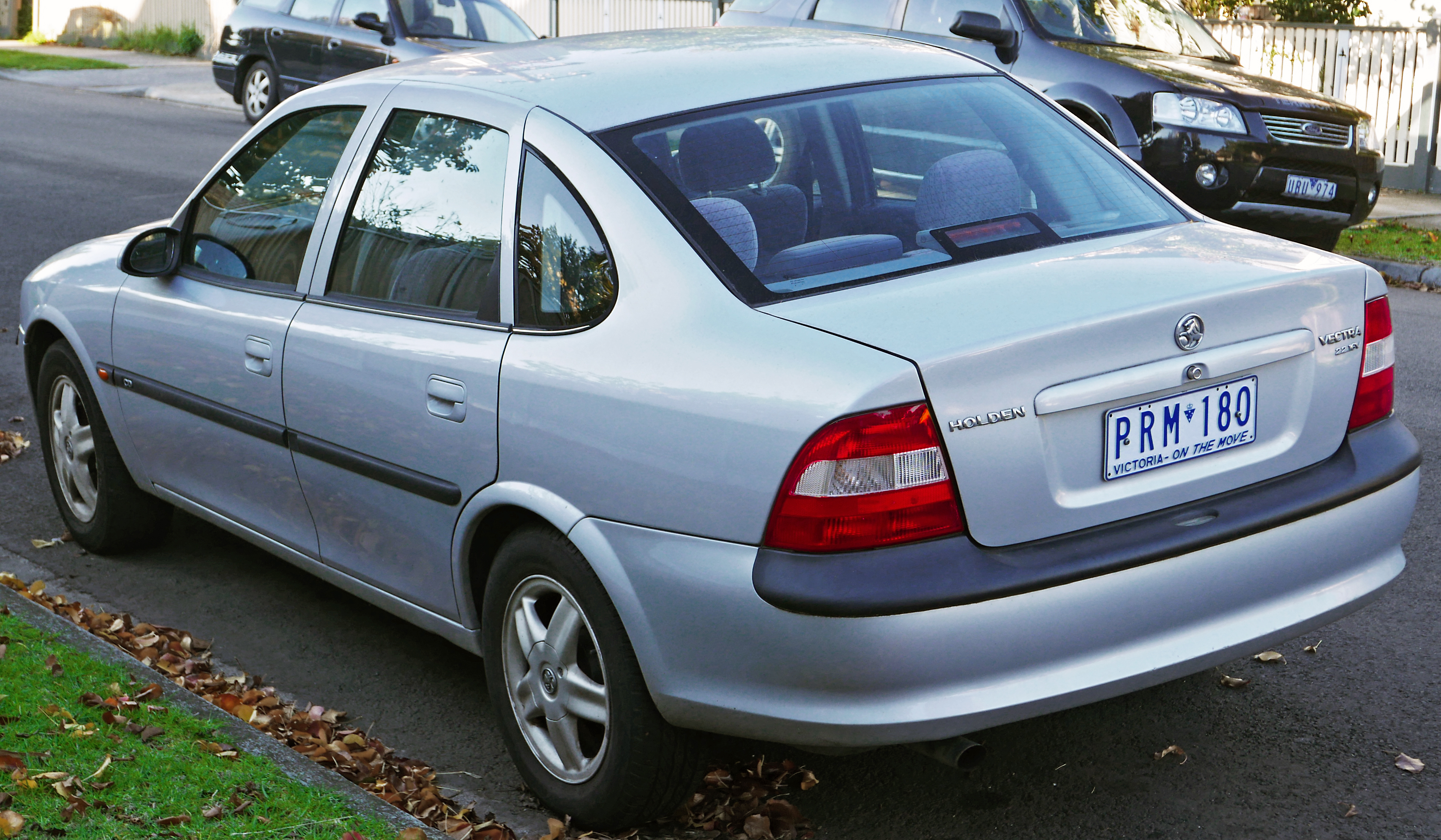
Saloon (Holden Vectra)

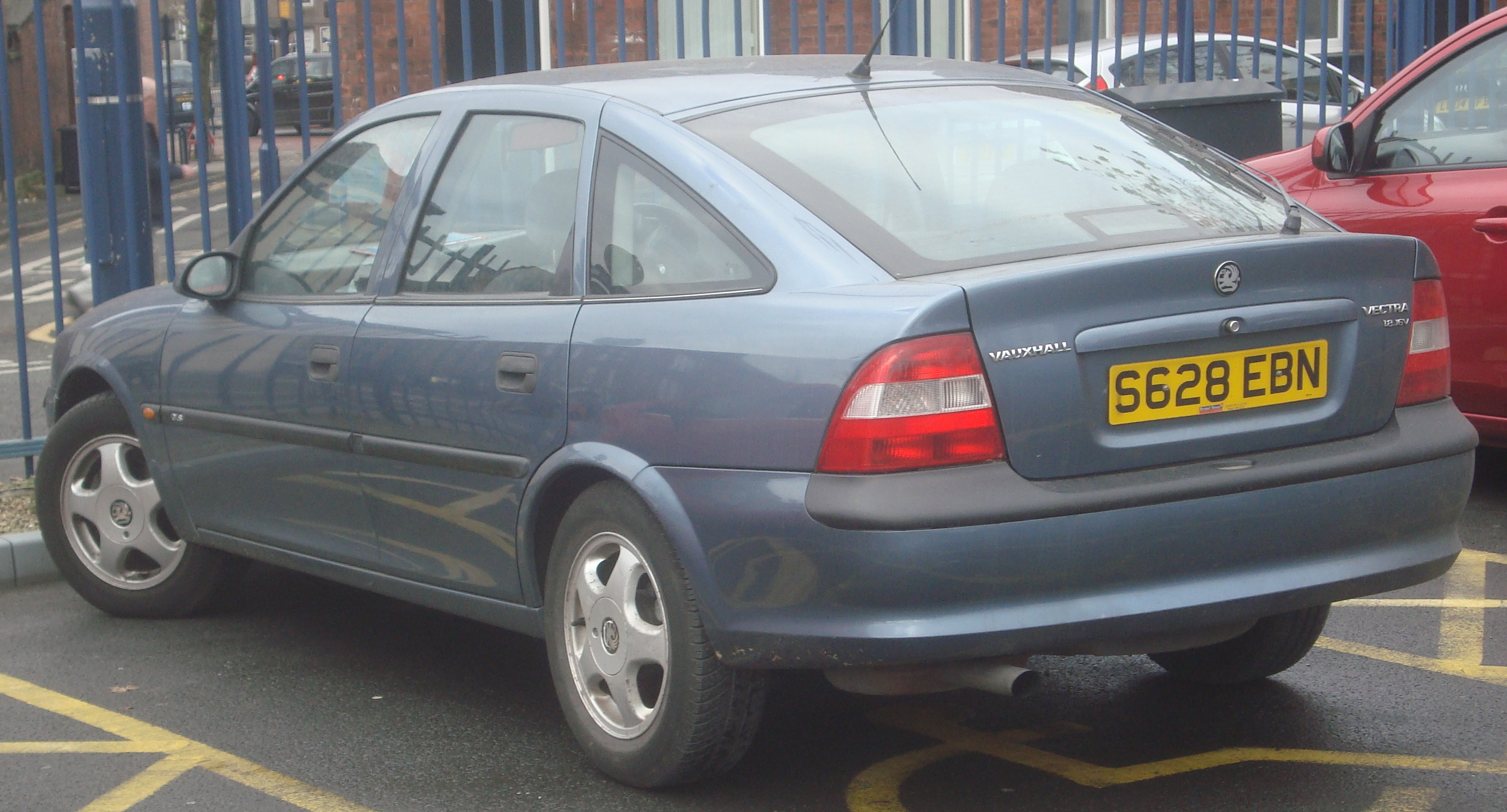
Hatchback (Vauxhall Vectra)

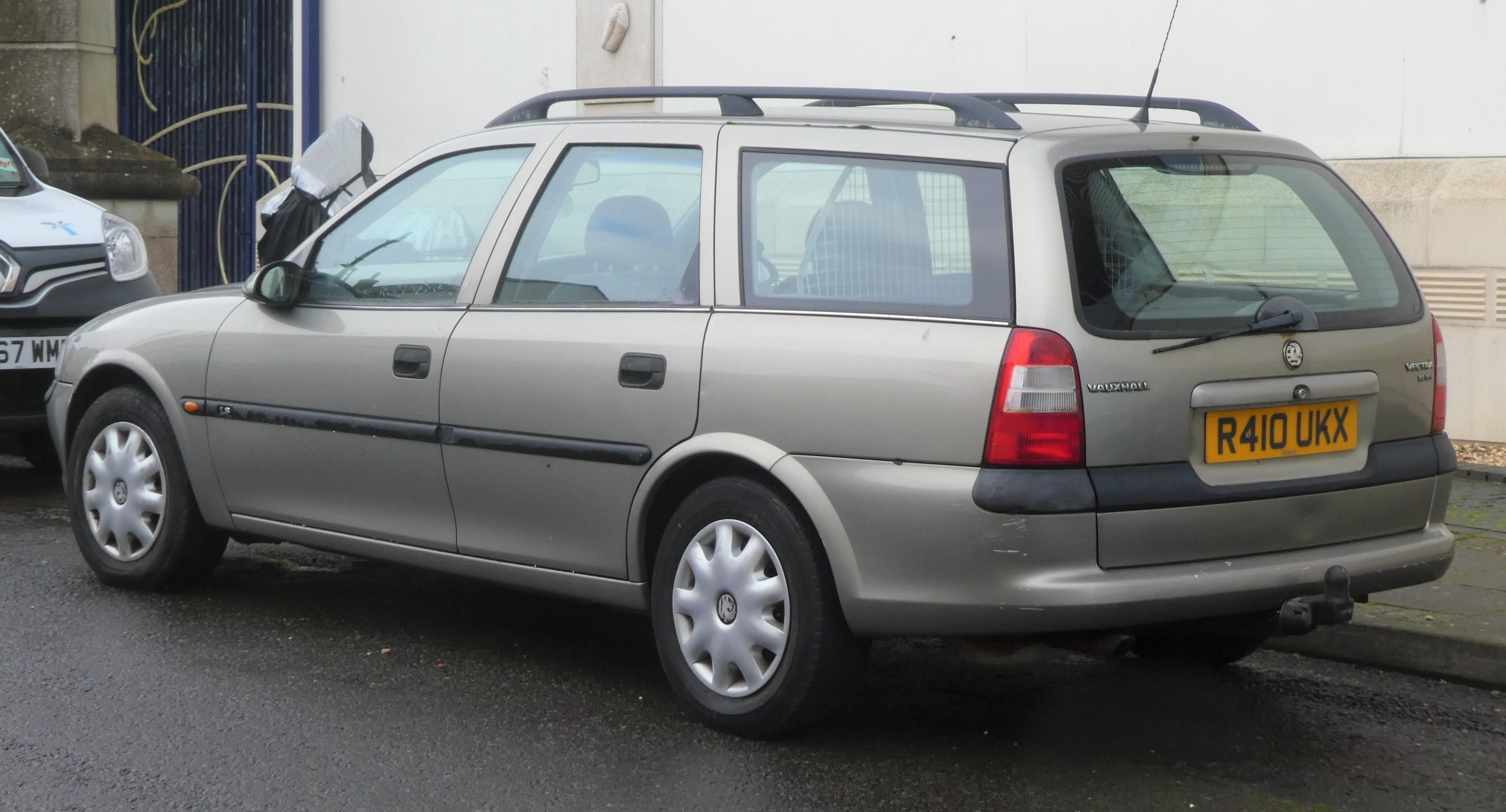
Estate (Vauxhall Vectra)

The second model, the Vectra B, was introduced in October 1995 for the 1996 model year, at the Frankfurt Motor Show, and the model range came to include an estate version for the first time.

In the United Kingdom, the legacy Vauxhall Cavalier nameplate (retained for the previous generation) was finally retired and this model was sold as the Vauxhall Vectra.

The five-door estate version premiered in September 1996, with the tagline ‘One step ahead of the Mob’ used in the UK. This was the first station wagon version of Opel's mid-sized family car since the Ascona A was discontinued in 1975. By contrast, Vauxhall had offered an estate version of the Cavalier Mark II, equivalent to the Ascona C, using the bodywork of the Holden Camira wagon in Australia.

The Vauxhall-badged Vectra B was the last Vauxhall to be produced at the company's Luton plant, where the end of automobile production was announced in December 2000, taking effect just over a year later. Car production at the site finished in March 2002, although production of commercial vehicles continued until 2025.

Engines started from the 75 PS (55 kW) 1.6 L, Family 1 but eventually the 8-valve engines were all replaced by 16-valve powerplants. The 2.0 L Family II engine, with 136 PS (100 kW) was developed as a basis for touring car racing (later in Australia, 2.2 L 108 kW), but the top of the line was a 2.5 L V6 with 170 PS (125 kW). Diesel power came once again from Isuzu, with 1.7 litres and 82 PS (60 kW), also a 2.0 L Ecotec with either 82 or 101 PS (60 or 74 kW) and 2.2 L Ecotec with 125 PS (92 kW). In 2001, the all new 2.2 L petrol engine, as carried over to the Vectra C, was introduced with the 2.5 L petrol in its last incarnation being upgraded to a 2.6 L to accommodate emissions improvements.

=== Facelift ===
In February 1999, the Vectra was updated, receiving a mildly modified body (that can be identified by the single piece headlight units and body coloured bumpers) together with somewhat improved handling and better equipment. Some engines were also updated, with the 2.2 16V replacing the 2.0 16V in many markets. The facelifted Vauxhall Vectra sister model went on sale two months later, in April.

Facelift

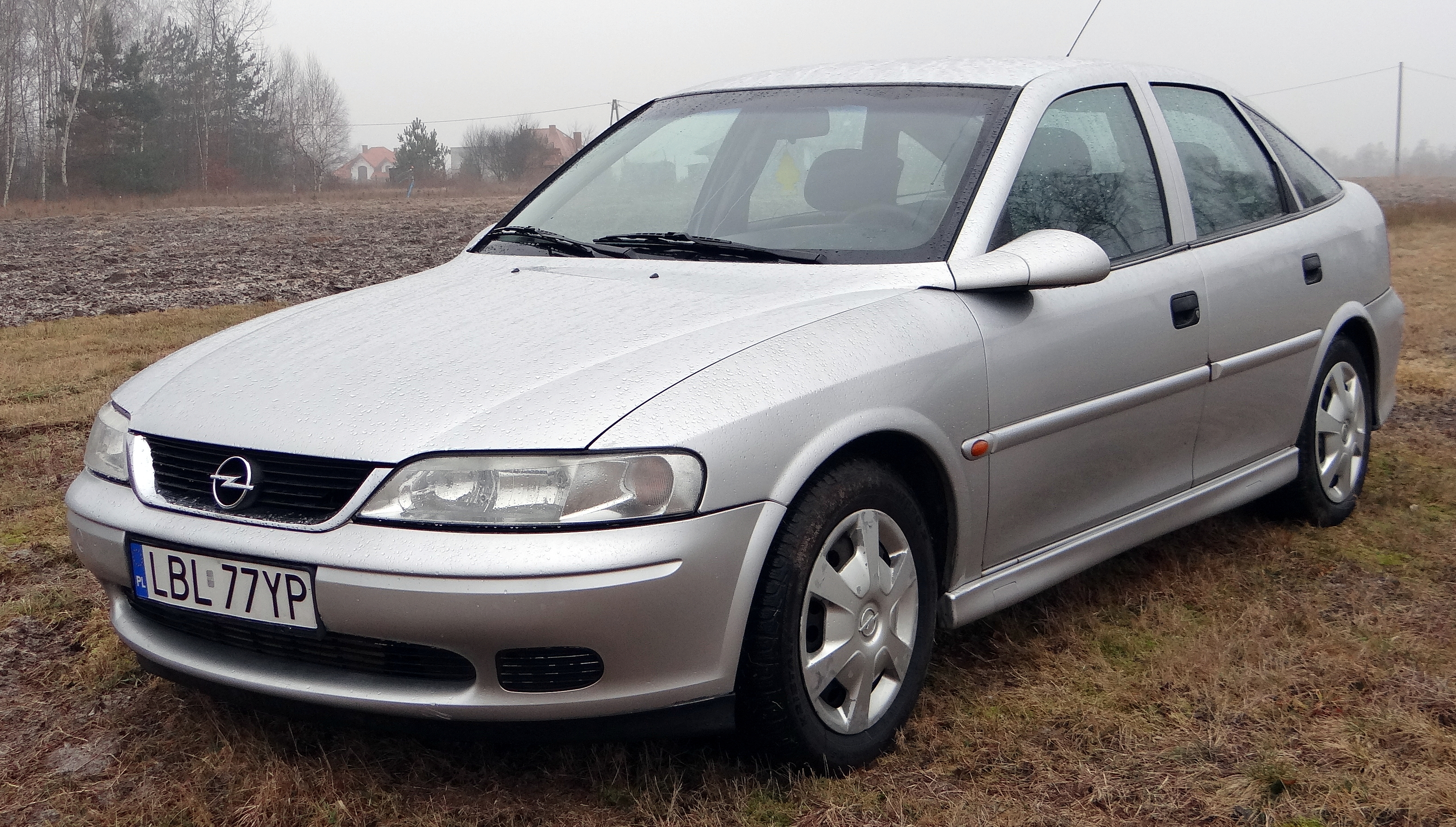
Hatchback (facelift)

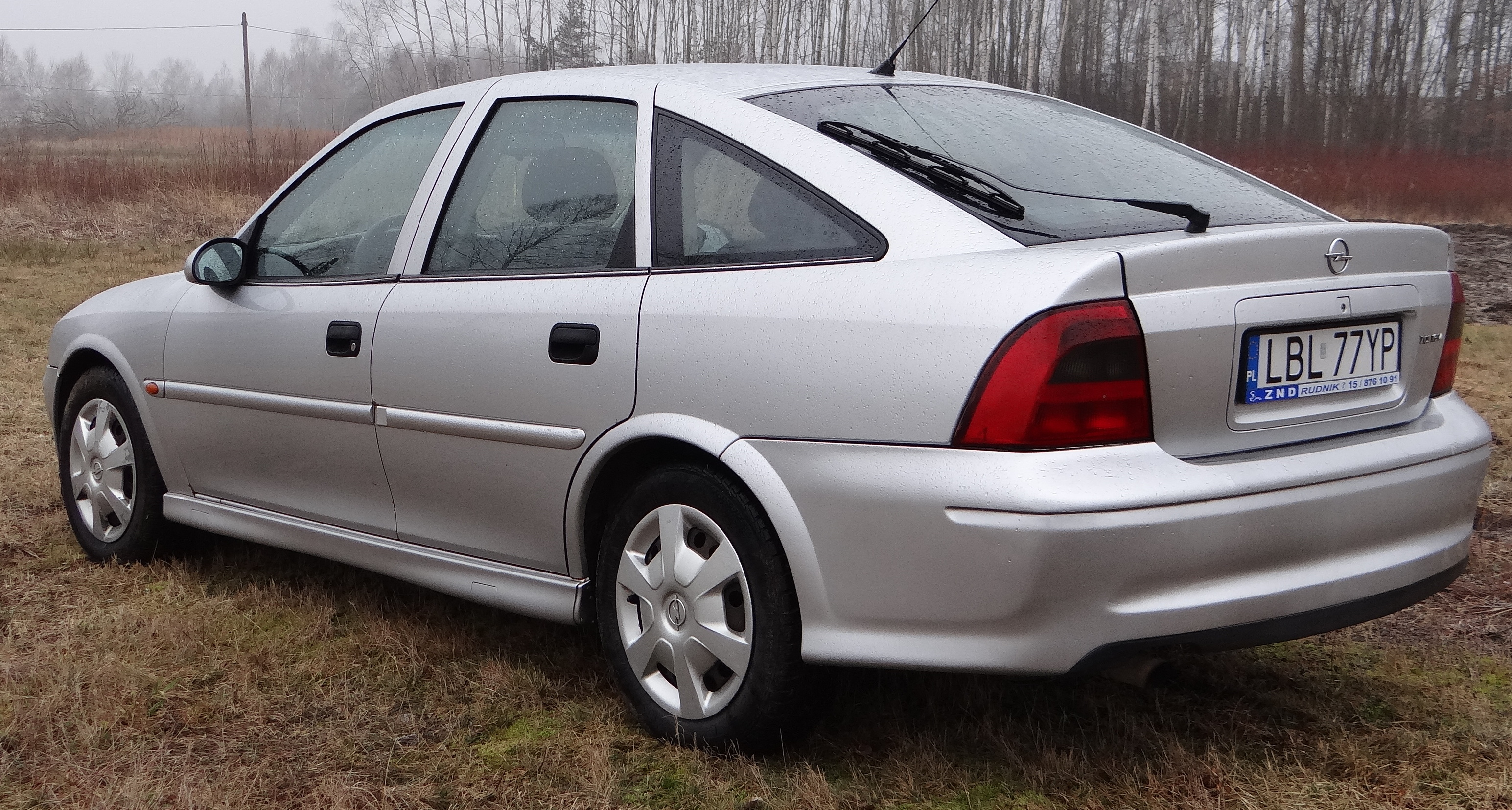
Hatchback (facelift)

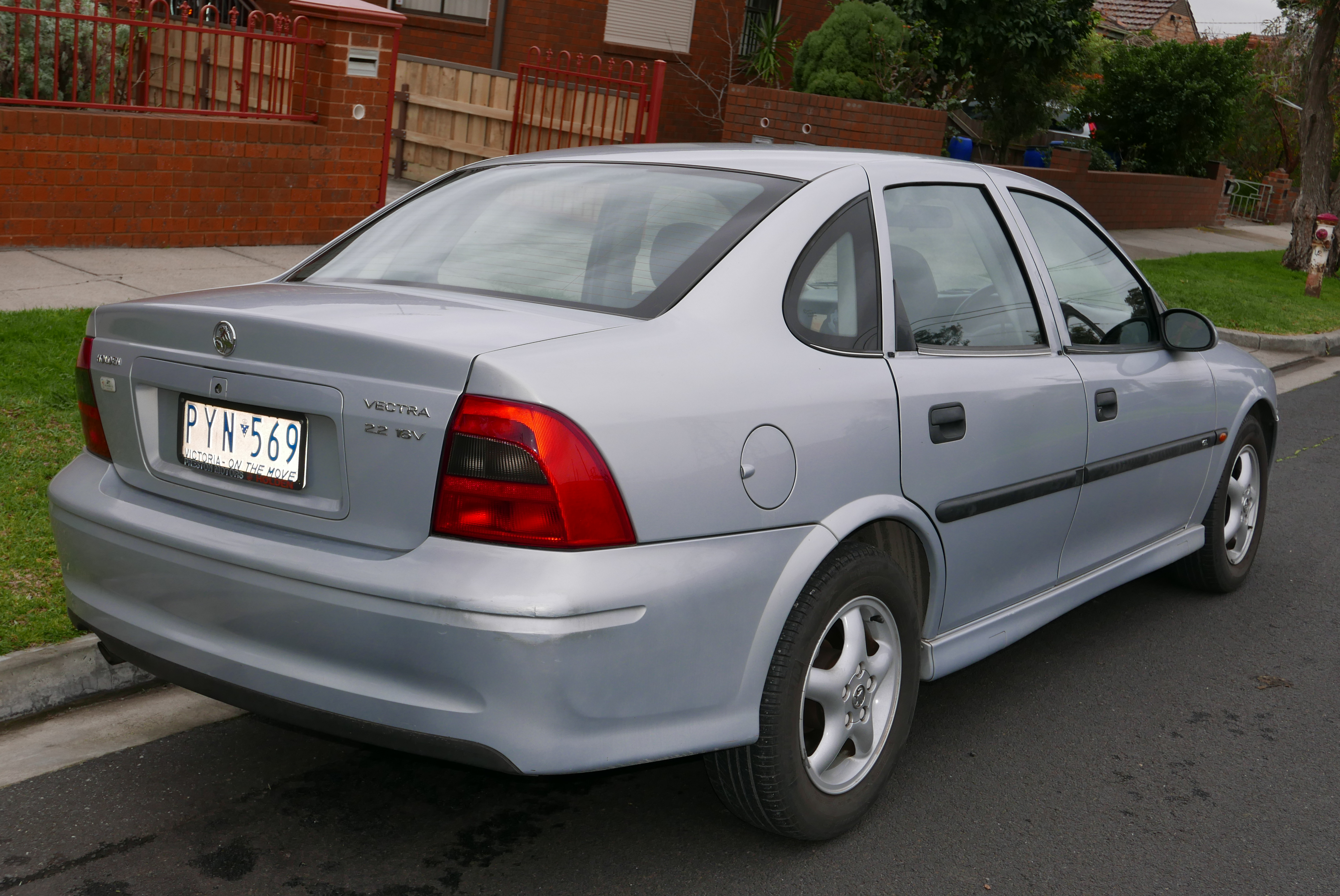
Sedan (Holden Vectra)

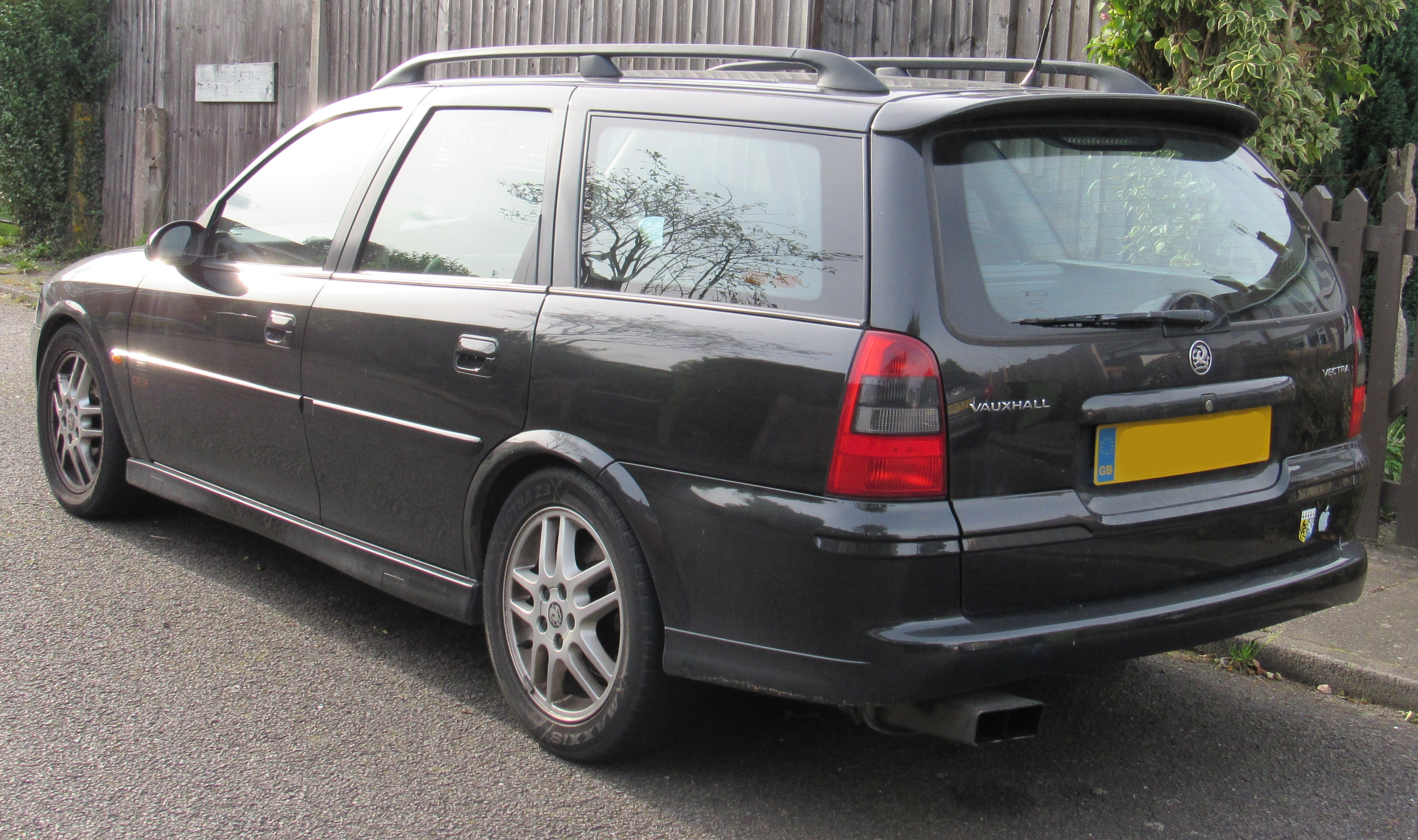
Estate (Vauxhall Vectra)

Sporting limited edition models included the touring car championship inspired i500, ST200, Super Touring and GSi. The first model was developed in Germany by Opel Motorsport, with the V6 engine's power increased to 195 PS (143 kW).

The ST200 was a limited run car developed and built by MSD in Milton Keynes. Based on the Vectra GSI, upgrades included AP Racing four-pot calipers and 325 mm discs, AP Racing Suretrac LSD, a lowered final drive, KONI suspension, Speedline wheels and Recaro seat. Power was increased to 200 PS (147 kW). Only 38 ST200s were produced.

The Supertouring was a limited edition trim level based on the Vectra SRi. It was available in only three colours - white, black or red. Two engines were offered - the 2.0 16v with 136 PS (100 kW) or the 170 PS (125 kW) 2.5 V6, with an Irmscher sports exhaust system and white 16-inch alloys and GSi front bumpers.

Only 3,900 2.5 GSi models were ever produced, mostly in saloon and hatchback guise. With only 317 estate versions produced during this time, they became one of the rarest production Vauxhalls ever.

On the 2001 and 2002 model years, a last of the line 2.6 GSi was made also but these were limited to five hundred cars. These were again mostly saloons and hatchbacks, however 37 estates were made. These end of production models received a host of upgrades, including Xenon headlamps and larger front brakes.

In October 2013, Top Gear magazine placed the 1995 Vectra on its list of The 13 Worst Cars Of The Last 20 Years, describing the car as "so mediocre that Jeremy Clarkson refused to drive it."

Production of the Vectra B ended in March 2002.

=== International production ===
Egypt

In Egypt, the production of the Opel Vectra B commenced during 1996 with two models, initially in GLS trim with a 1.6-litre, 8v engine and a manual transmission, or in CD trim with a 8-valve, 2.0-litre with automatic transmission.

Later in 2000, the revised model was produced with three models: 1.6 (8v) GLS with manual transmission, later replaced by the 1.6 16v GLS trim with automatic transmission, 2.0 16v CD with automatic transmission, and a 2.0 CDX trim (also automatic). Only the saloon body style was offered. In 2002, local production of the Opel Vectra ceased in favour of the Corsa saloon and Astra saloon.

North America

A related model sold in North America was the Saturn L-Series, introduced in 2000, but dropped from the line up in 2005. It was replaced by the 2007 Saturn Aura, which was built around GM's Epsilon architecture, shared with the Vectra C.

South America

The release of the second generation of the Chevrolet Vectra happened at the same time that the IndyCar series in Brazil, GM made a deal to use the Vectra as a Medical and Safety car for the race. The Vectra B came with the already available 2.0 8-valve engine with 110 PS (81 kW) on the GL and GLS versions and a national version of the previously 2.0 16 valve with 136 PS (100 kW) for the CD version.

In 1998, GM introduced a new, torquier 2.2-litre 8 valve engine with 123 PS (90 kW) for the GL and GLS, and a 16 valve version of the same with 138 PS (101 kW) and 207 N⋅m (153 lb⋅ft) for the CD version.

A facelift was done for the 2000 models, just like the European version. Production ran until 2005, when it was replaced by the new generation Vectra, based on the Opel Astra H Sedan. The Vectra was only offered in a 4-door saloon body in both generations (A & B).

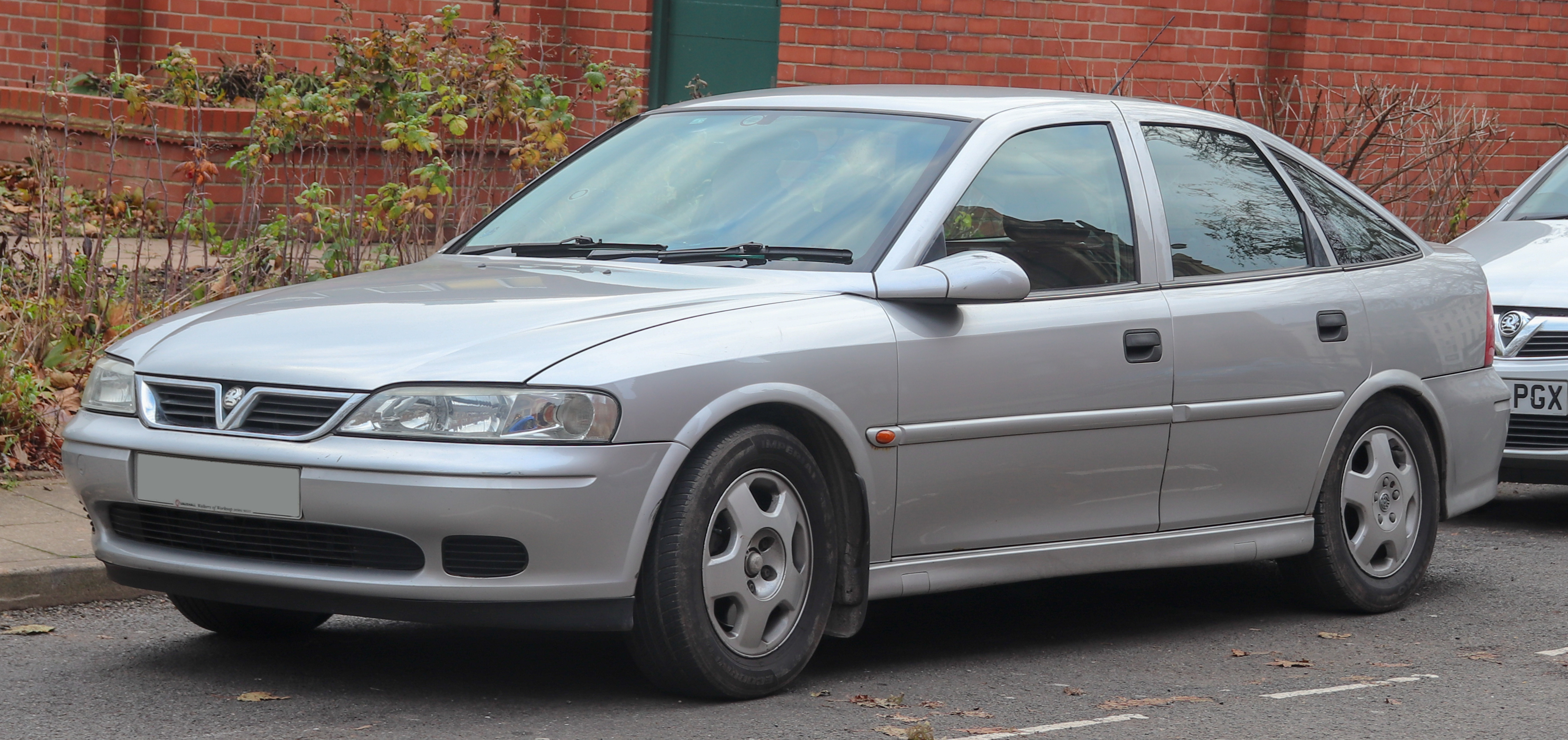
Vauxhall Vectra (United Kingdom)

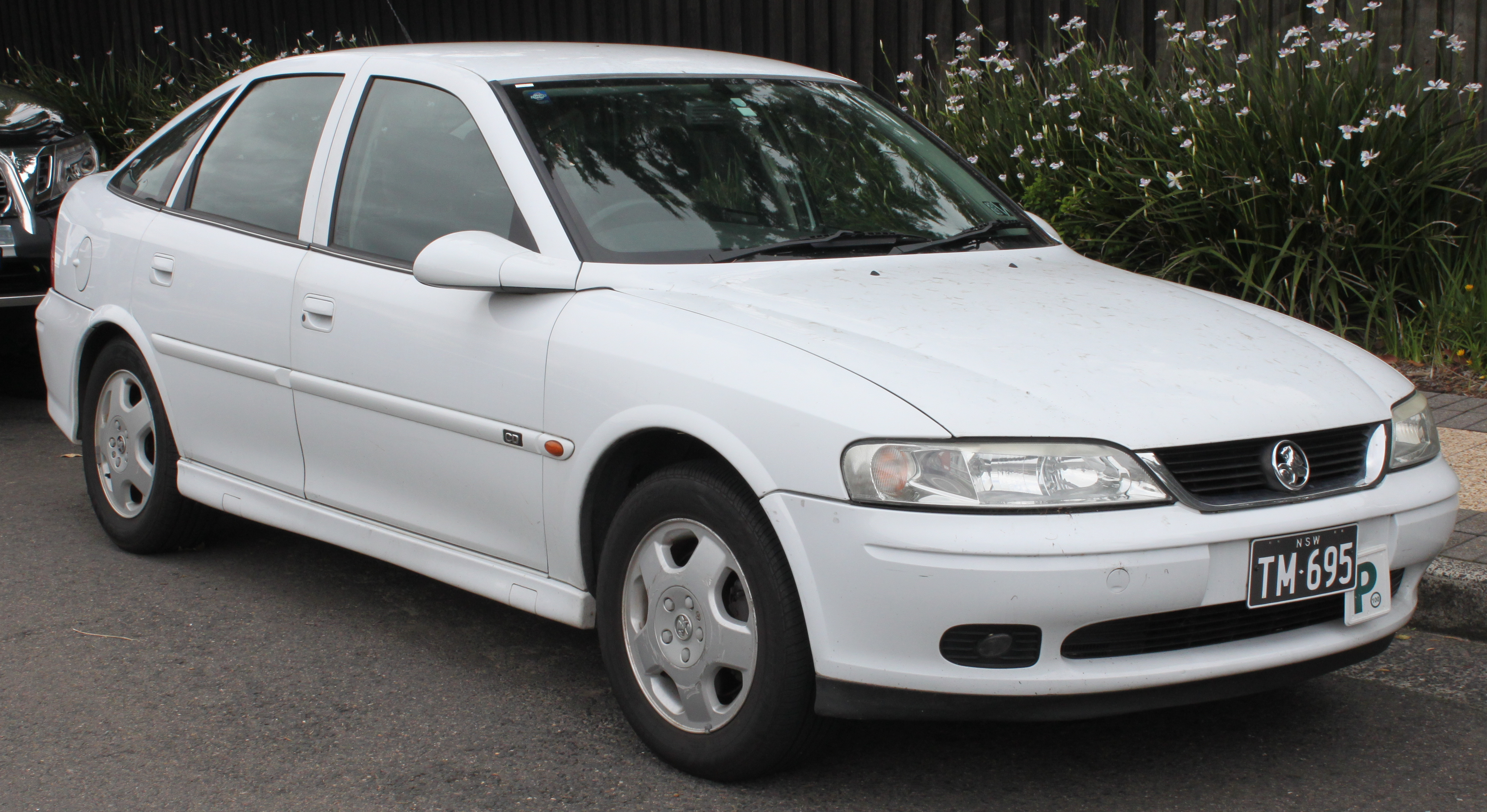
Holden Vectra (Australia and New Zealand)

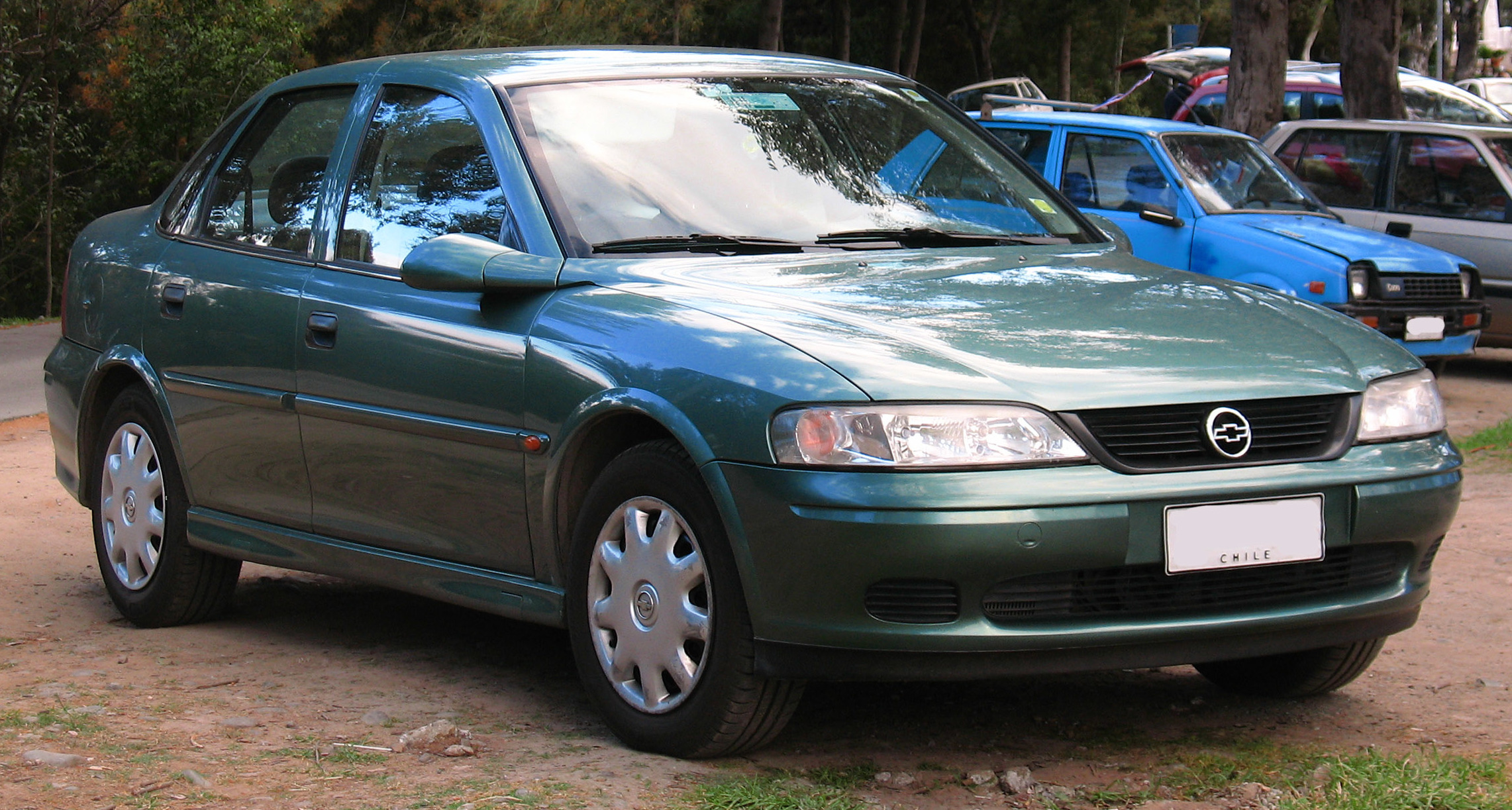
Chevrolet Vectra (South America)

== Vectra C (2002–2008) ==
Vectra C
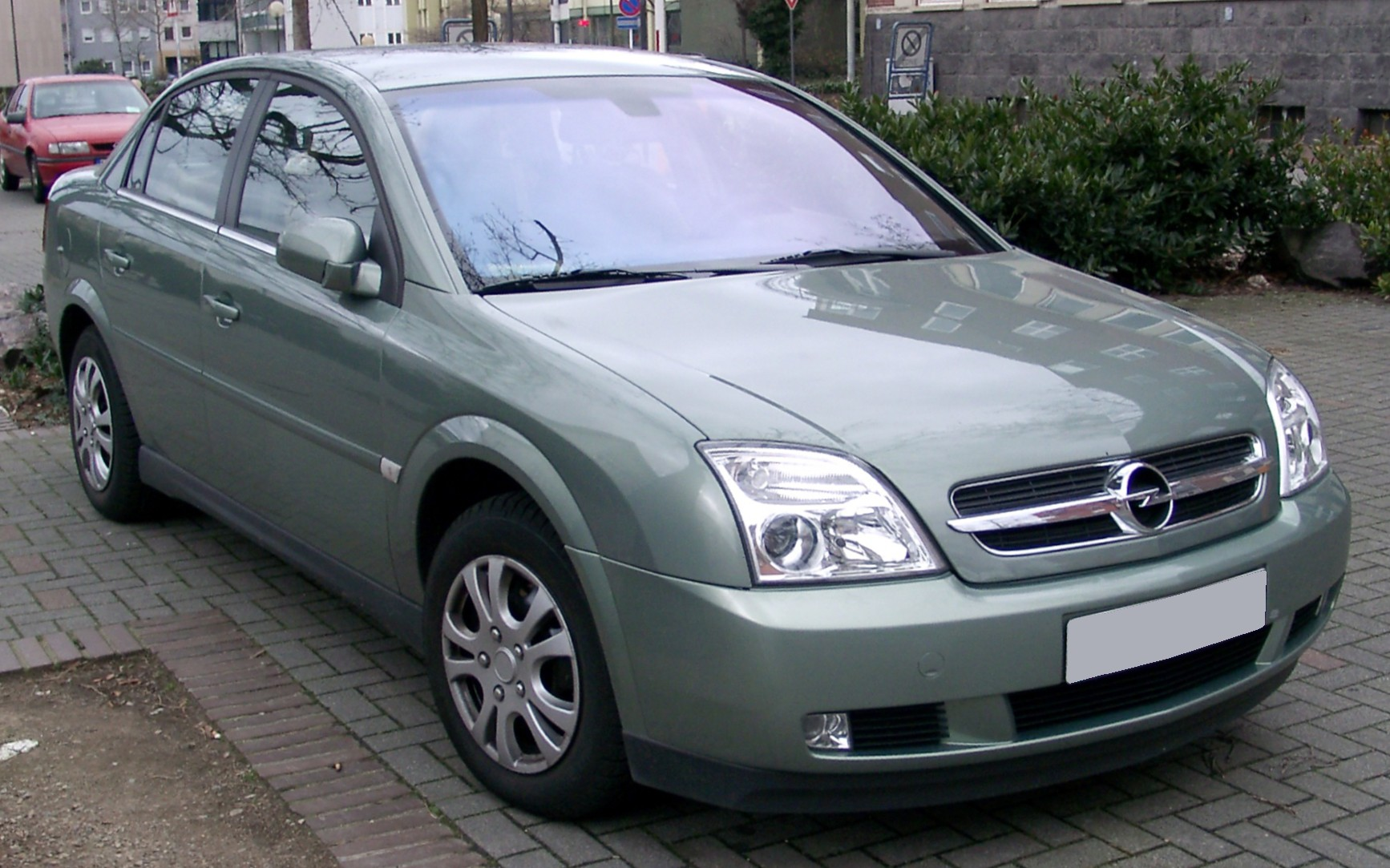
- Pre-facelift

Overview
- Also called: Chevrolet Vectra; Holden Vectra; Vauxhall Vectra
- Production: March 2002 – July 2008
- Assembly: Egypt: 6th of October City (GME); England: Ellesmere Port; Germany: Rüsselsheim; Ukraine: Zaporizhzhia (AvtoZAZ)

Body and chassis
- Body style: 4-door notchback saloon; 5-door hatchback; 5-door estate
- Platform: Epsilon platform
- Related: Opel Signum; Saab 9-3

Powertrain
- Engine: Petrol: 1.6 L Family 1 I4; 1.8 L Family 1 I4; 2.0 L Ecotec turbo I4; 2.2 L Ecotec I4; 2.8 L High Feature turbo V6; 3.2 L Ellesmere V6; Diesel: 1.9 L I4 CDTI; 2.0 L I4 DTI; 2.2 L I4 DTI; 3.0 L V6 CDTI
- Transmission: 6-speed automatic; 6-speed manual; 5-speed manual; 5-speed Easytronic automated manual; CVTronic

Dimensions
- Wheelbase: 2,700 mm (106.3 in) (saloon/hatch); 2,830 mm (111.4 in) (estate)
- Length: 4,596 mm (180.9 in) (saloon/hatch, pre-facelift); 4,611 mm (181.5 in) (saloon/hatch, post-facelift); 4,822 mm (189.8 in) (estate, pre-facelift); 4,839 mm (190.5 in) (estate, post-facelift); "OPC" versions 31 mm (1.2 in) longer
- Width: 1,798 mm (70.8 in)
- Height: 1,460 mm (57.5 in) (saloon/hatch); 1,500 mm (59.1 in) (estate)
- Curb weight: 1,393 kg (3,071 lb)

Pre-facelift

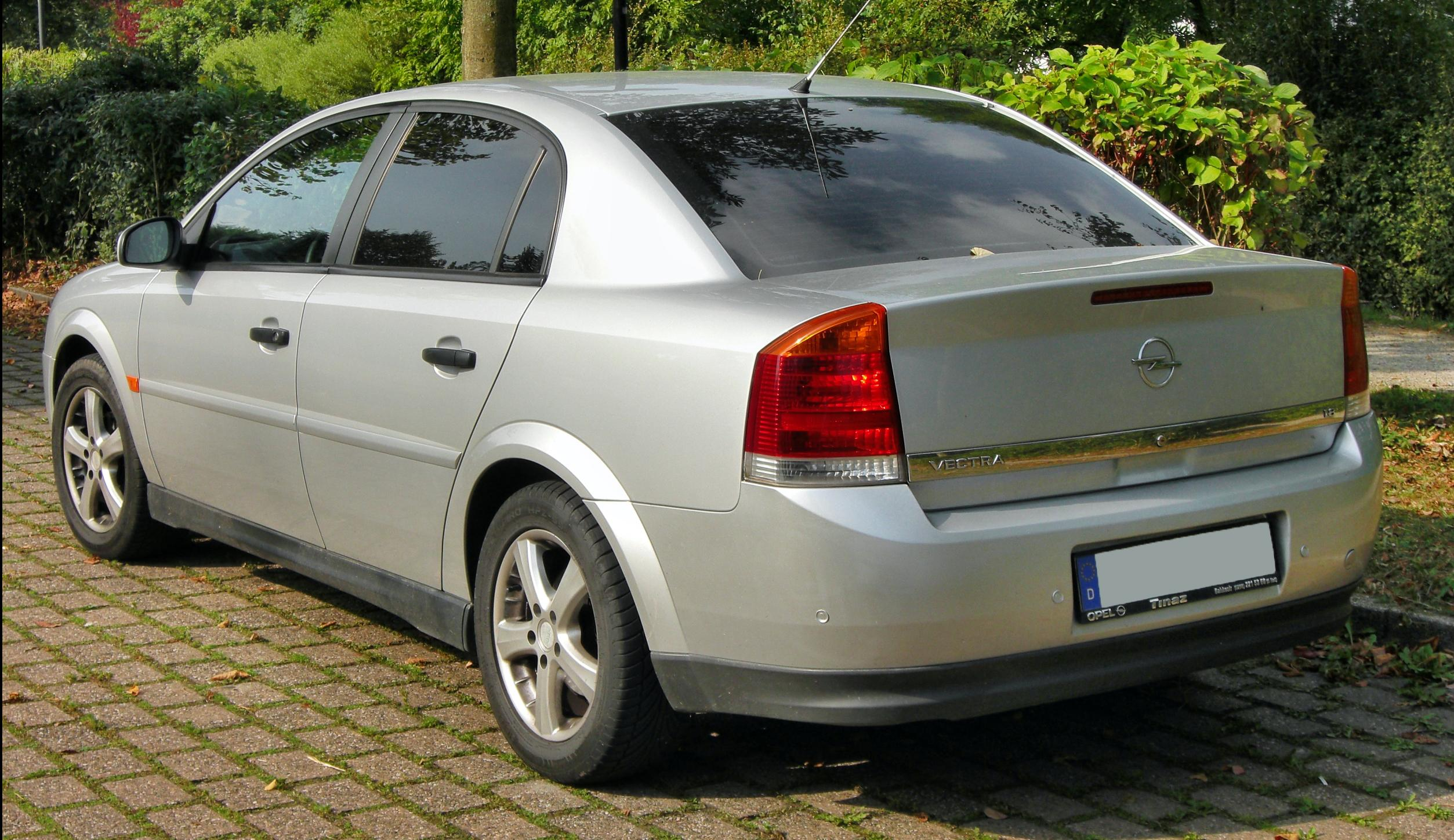
Saloon

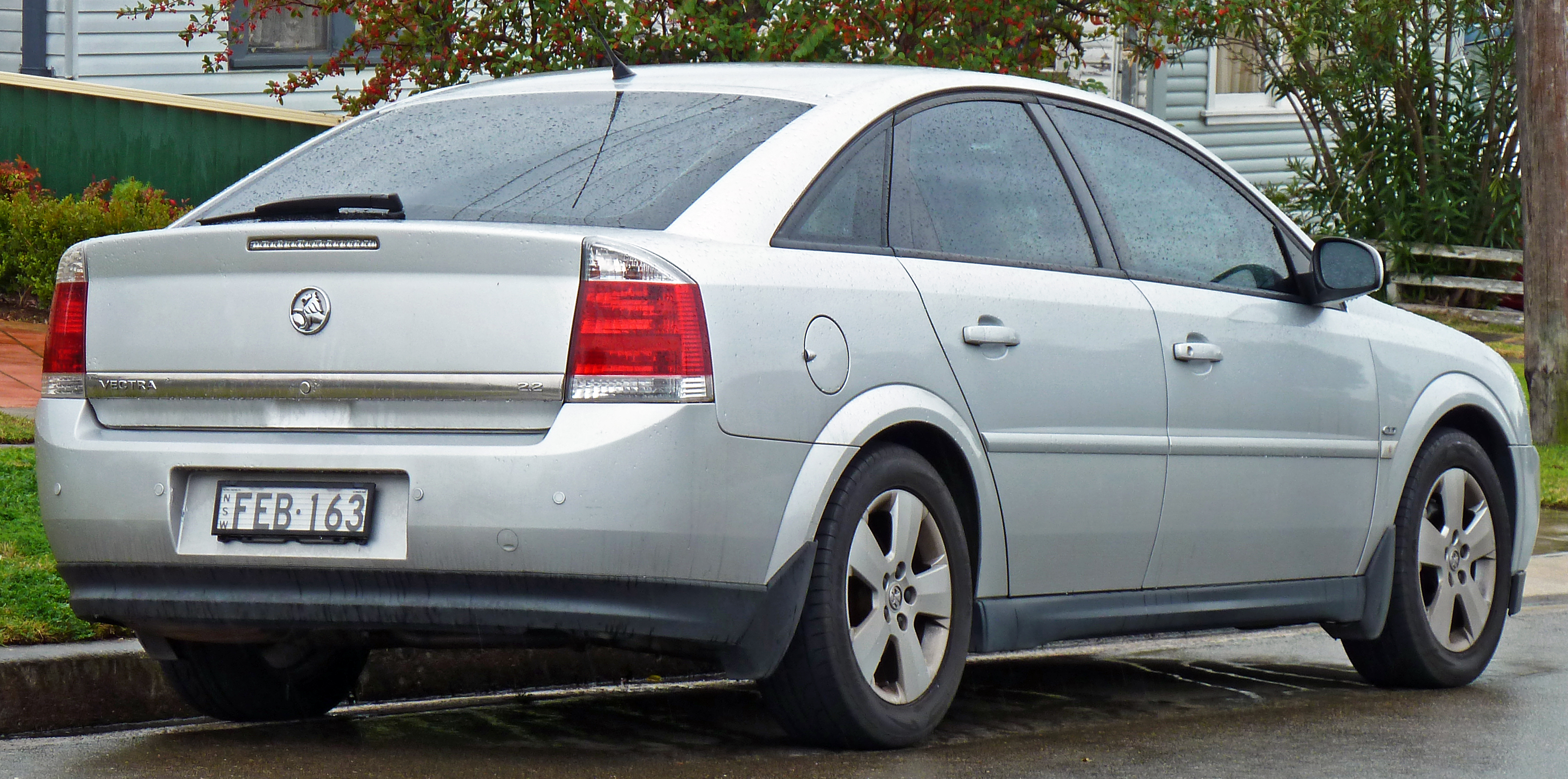
Hatchback (Holden Vectra)

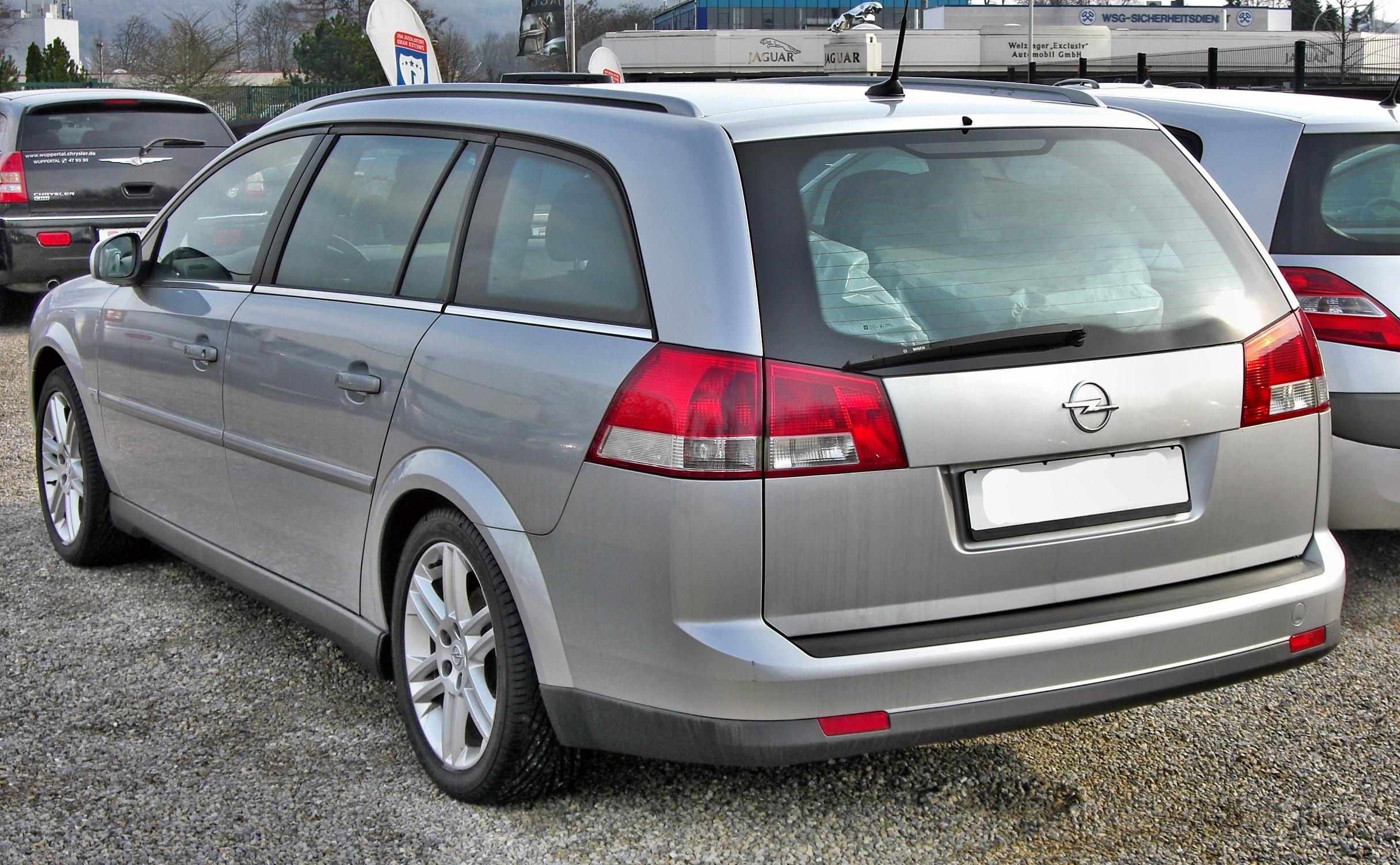
Estate

Built on the new GM Epsilon platform, the Opel Vectra C, released in March 2002 for the 2003 model year was initially available as a four-door notchback saloon and a five-door hatchback, known as the GTS. A five-door estate was added in October 2003. The Vectra C's official debut was at the 2002 Geneva Motor Show.

Originally, the Vectra C was due to début with the Saab 9-3 in October 2001, at the Frankfurt Motor Show, but in July 2001, it was announced that delays had forced General Motors to postpone the introduction. The hatchback version premiered in September 2002. The four door notchback saloon version of the Vectra C almost resembled a two-box four door fastback saloon. While the earlier Cavalier and Vectras had been built at the company's Luton plant, the second generation Vauxhall Vectra was built at the Ellesmere Port plant from the introduction. Pilot production at Ellesmere Port started in late 2001.

The Vectra C was first seen in November 1999, in a copy of Auto Express. At the Frankfurt Motor Show in October 2003, the estate version premièred, which had a slightly longer wheelbase than the hatchback and saloon versions. Sharing the 2,830 millimetres (111 in) wheelbase of the estate, an "executive hatchback" sold under the Opel/Vauxhall Signum nameplate. The Signum, which was based partly on the Vectra C, featured a completely different layout in the rear.

The engine range was substantially modified to account for the increased curb weight of the Vectra C. The 90 kW (121 hp) 1.8 litre Family 1 Ecotec engine was reserved for the base model, with the main petrol engine for the Vectra C, making up the vast bulk of production, being the Ecotec 2.2 litre chain driven unit producing 108 kW (145 hp); along with a new range topping 3.2 litre 54-Degree V6, with 155 kW (208 hp). From June to July 2002, Ed Harris starred in adverts for the Vauxhall Vectra in the United Kingdom. Pierluigi Collina also starred in adverts across Europe for the Vectra, as well as the Signum, in the end of 2005.

In 2003, a 2.0 litre turbocharged Ecotec engine with 129 kW (173 hp) was also notionally offered. Being a main engine for another GM brand, Saab, it was only ever sold in small numbers in the Vectra. The 2.2 litre was upgraded in 2004, with the 'Direct' name added to the model line, indicating the new high pressure direct injection update that increased power output to 115 kW (154 hp) with improved emissions.

Diesel power, which had become important for commercial success in Europe, was initially provided by the Vectra B's 2.0 and 2.2 DTI engines, with a top of the range Isuzu sourced 3.0 litre DMAX V6 outputting 132 kW (177 hp).

In October 2004, the four cylinder diesel engine was replaced with a Fiat designed 1.9 litre Ecotec CDTI engine capable of producing 89 kW (119 hp) in 8v form and 110 kW (148 hp) in 16v form. Handling was reported to be much better than the previous Vectra.

Facelift
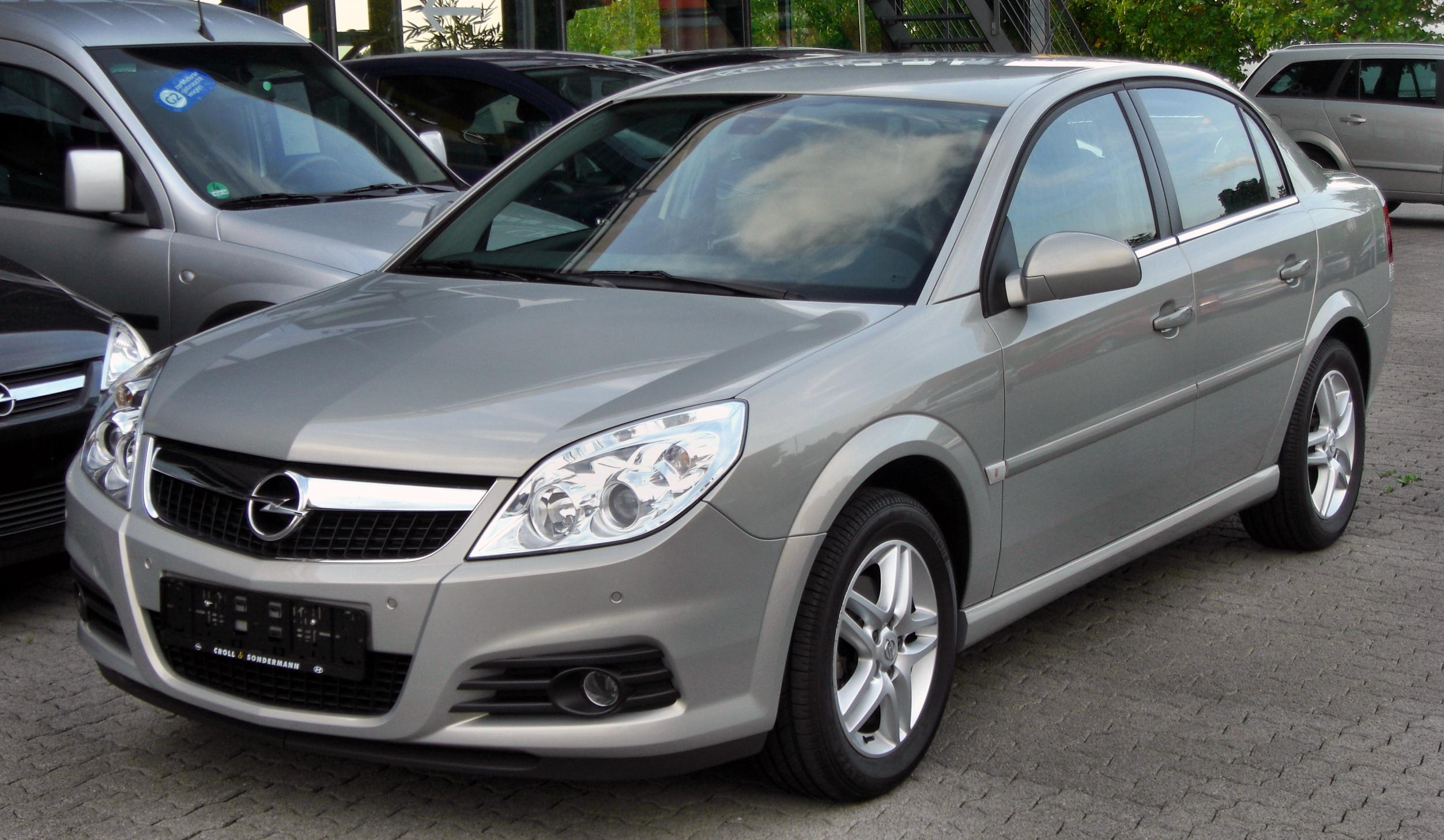

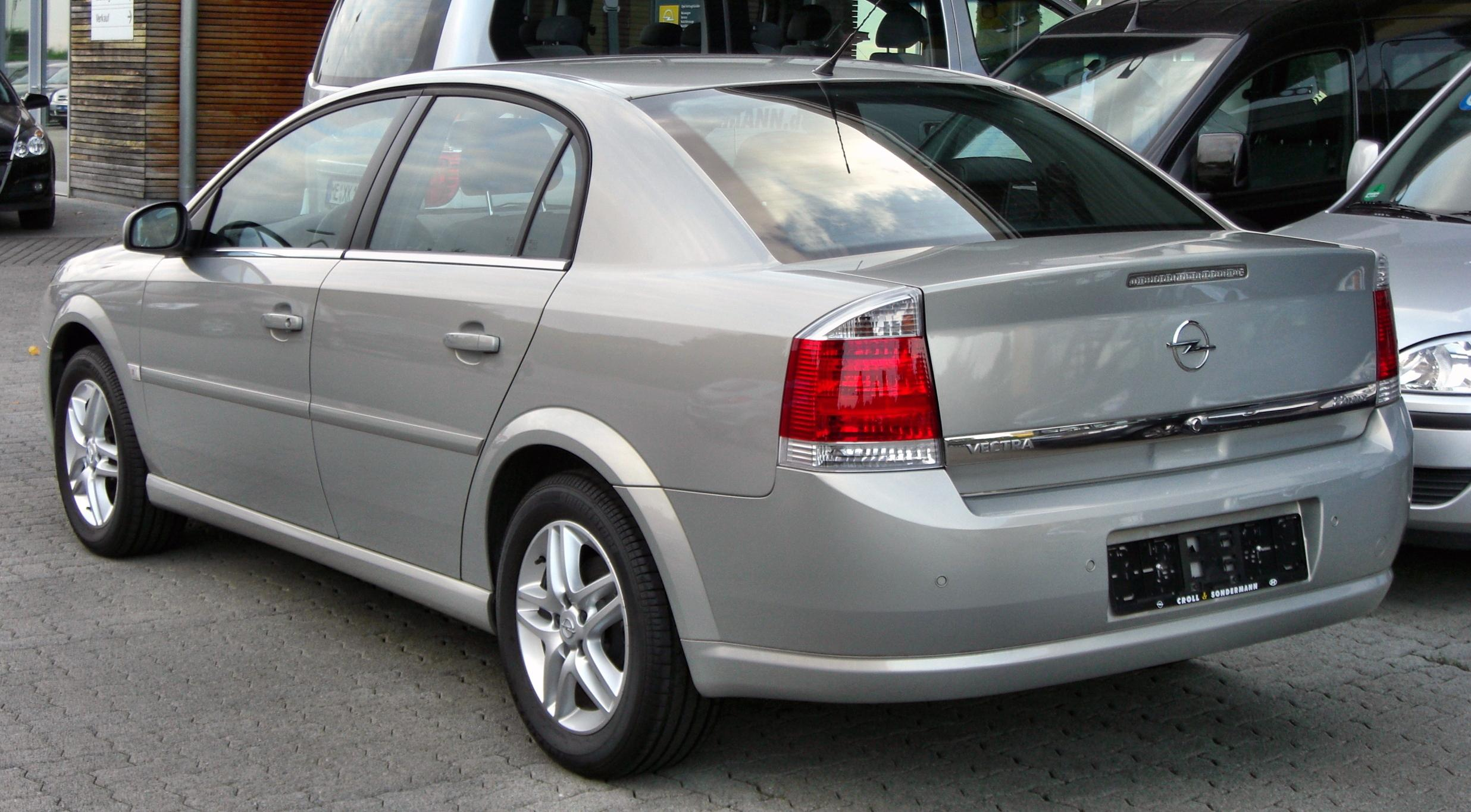
Saloon

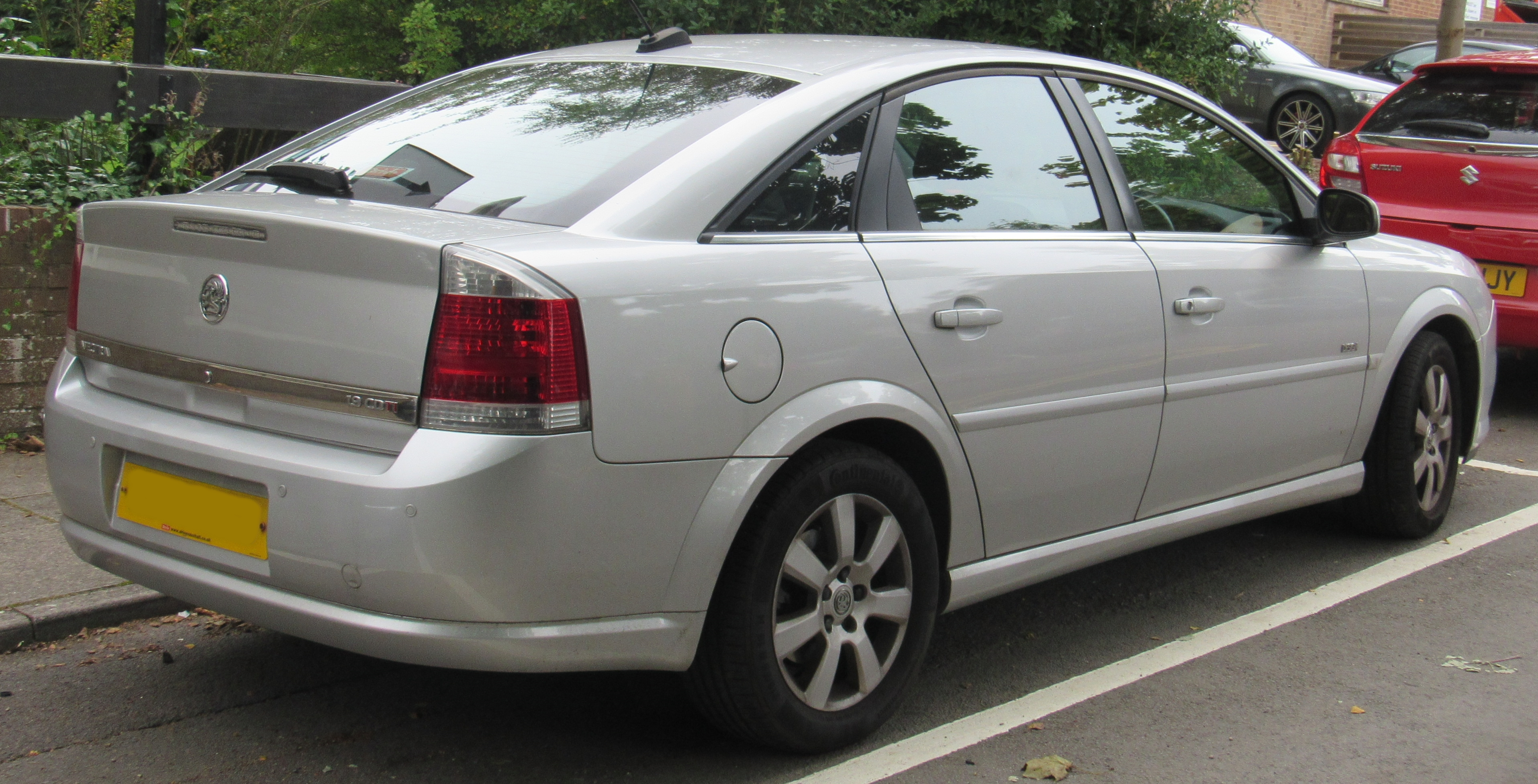
Hatchback (Vauxhall Vectra)

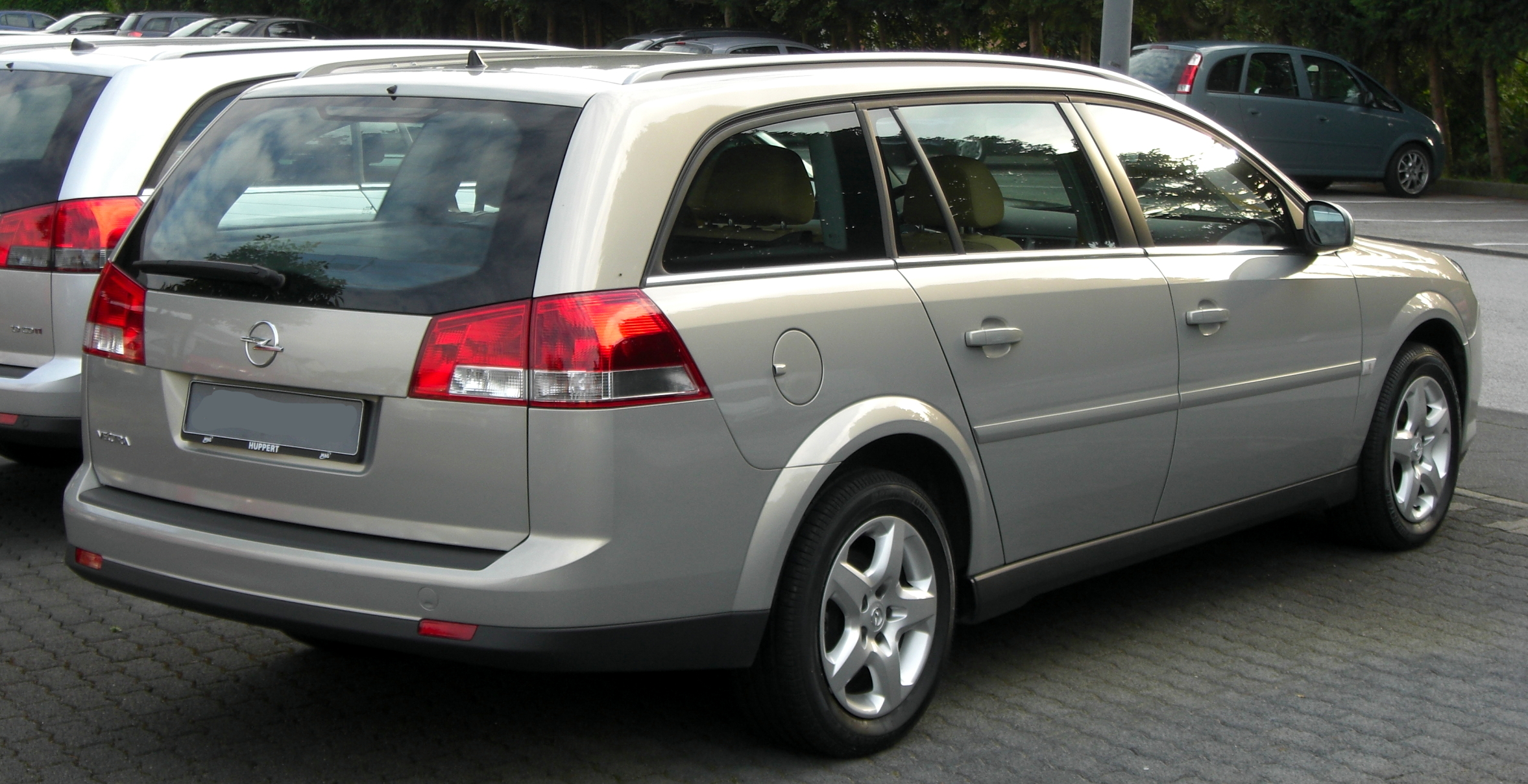
Estate

The Vectra C received a facelift in September 2005, with the début at the Frankfurt Motor Show, and it retained a similar line of engines. However, the power of the 3.0 diesel was increased to 137 kW (184 hp), and the petrol 3.2 litre V6 engine was replaced by an Australian built turbocharged 2.8 litre High Feature V6 unit. This Saab co-developed motor could produce 170 kW (228 hp). Opel installed the twin scroll turbo engine in its Signum productline with 185 kW (248 hp) output. The base 1.8 litre petrol engine was upgraded to the 103 kW (138 hp) Z18XER, which featured Variable Valve Timing.

The 185 kW (248 hp) version of the 2.8 litre V6 was available for the Vectra later in 2006. Opel also introduced – for the first time – an OPC version of the Vectra, using the VXR name in the United Kingdom. These high performance variants were only available as hatchbacks and estates. In the United Kingdom the power of the High Feature V6 engine was increased to 188 kW (252 hp), giving a maximum speed approaching 250 km/h (155 mph).

Production of the Vectra C and Signum ended in July 2008.

=== Overseas markets and rebadges ===
Australia and New Zealand

The Vectra C was branded as the Holden Vectra in Australia and New Zealand. Between 1998 and 2001, Holden in Australia assembled the Vectra for export to other RHD markets in the region, with a view to exporting 60 per cent of output, although this was adversely affected by the Asian economic crisis.

Locally designated the ZC series and launched in March 2003, the Vectra C was only available as a sedan and hatchback. Holden did not offer the Vectra C estate due to the presence of the Astra and later Holden Viva (Daewoo Lacetti) estates. The Vectra was dropped and replaced by the Holden Epica, a badge engineered Daewoo Tosca early in 2007.

Due to stockpiling of Vectras from 2005 for the market in Australasia, there was enough supply of the car for deliveries to last through to 2007. As a result, facelifted Vectra Cs were not sold in those markets. In 2008, the Vectra OPC was available with either six speed manual or six speed automatic transmission (previous Vectra OPC had manual gearbox only). The 2.8L DOHC V6 turbo engine could generate 206 kW (276 hp).

United Kingdom

Sales of the Vectra C in the United Kingdom were not as strong as those of its predecessors. For much of its production life, the original Vectra was the fourth best selling car in the country, but the Vectra C never came higher than tenth in the country's car sales charts, though within its own market sector it held on to second place, behind the Ford Mondeo.

In 2007, it finally made the Top 10 of Britain's car sales charts, being the nation's tenth most popular new car with over 50,000 sales, outselling the Ford Mondeo for the first time since 1999. Also, in January 2007, the estate variant was awarded Estate Car of the Year 2007, by What Car? magazine.

South America

While the Vectra C was sold in Mexico and Chile as the Chevrolet Vectra, it was not marketed in Brazil, where Chevrolet opted to sell the Astra H under the Vectra brand from 2006 to 2011. Both local spec cars were powered by the FlexPower SOHC engine originally introduced in 1982 in the Chevrolet Monza.

Ireland

In Ireland, the Vectra C was produced until February 2010.

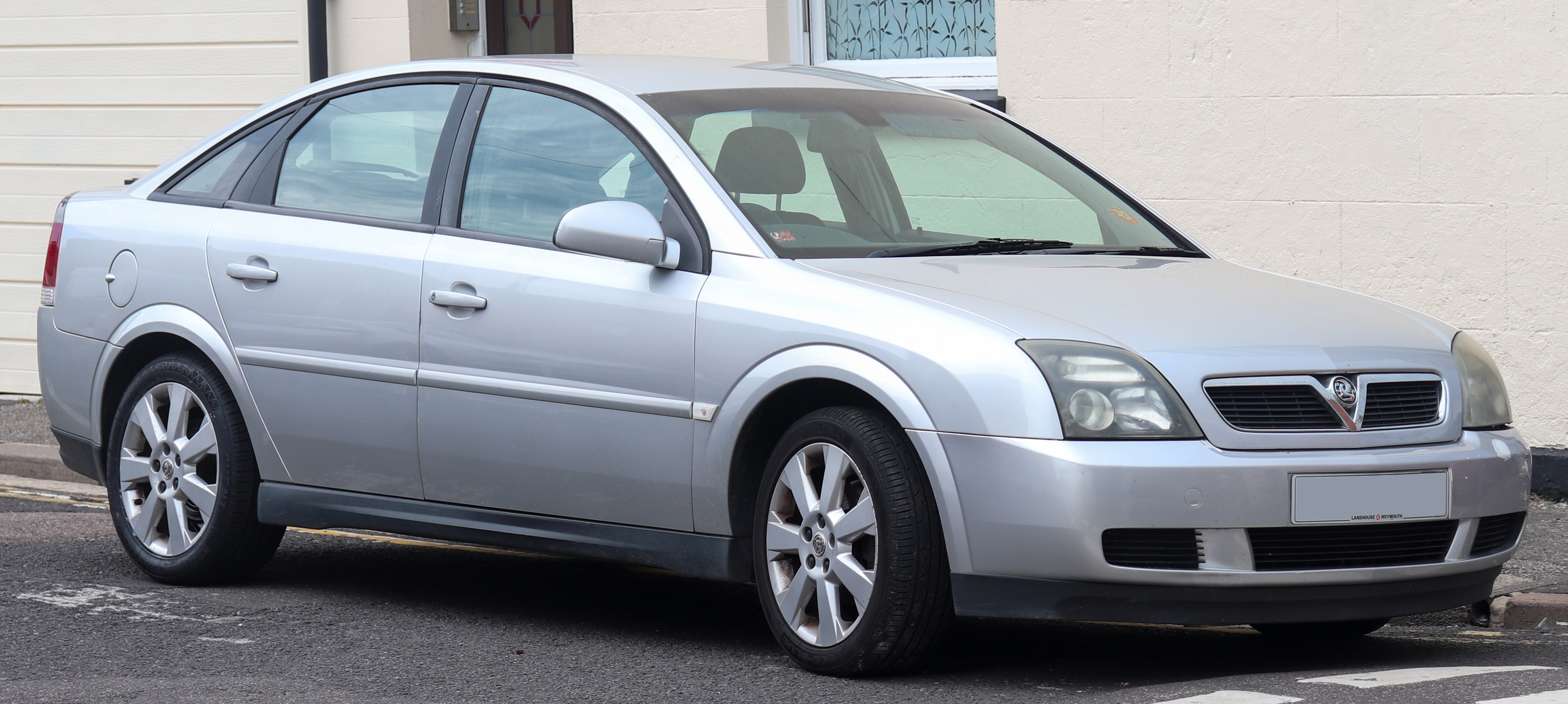
Vauxhall Vectra (pre-facelift, United Kingdom)

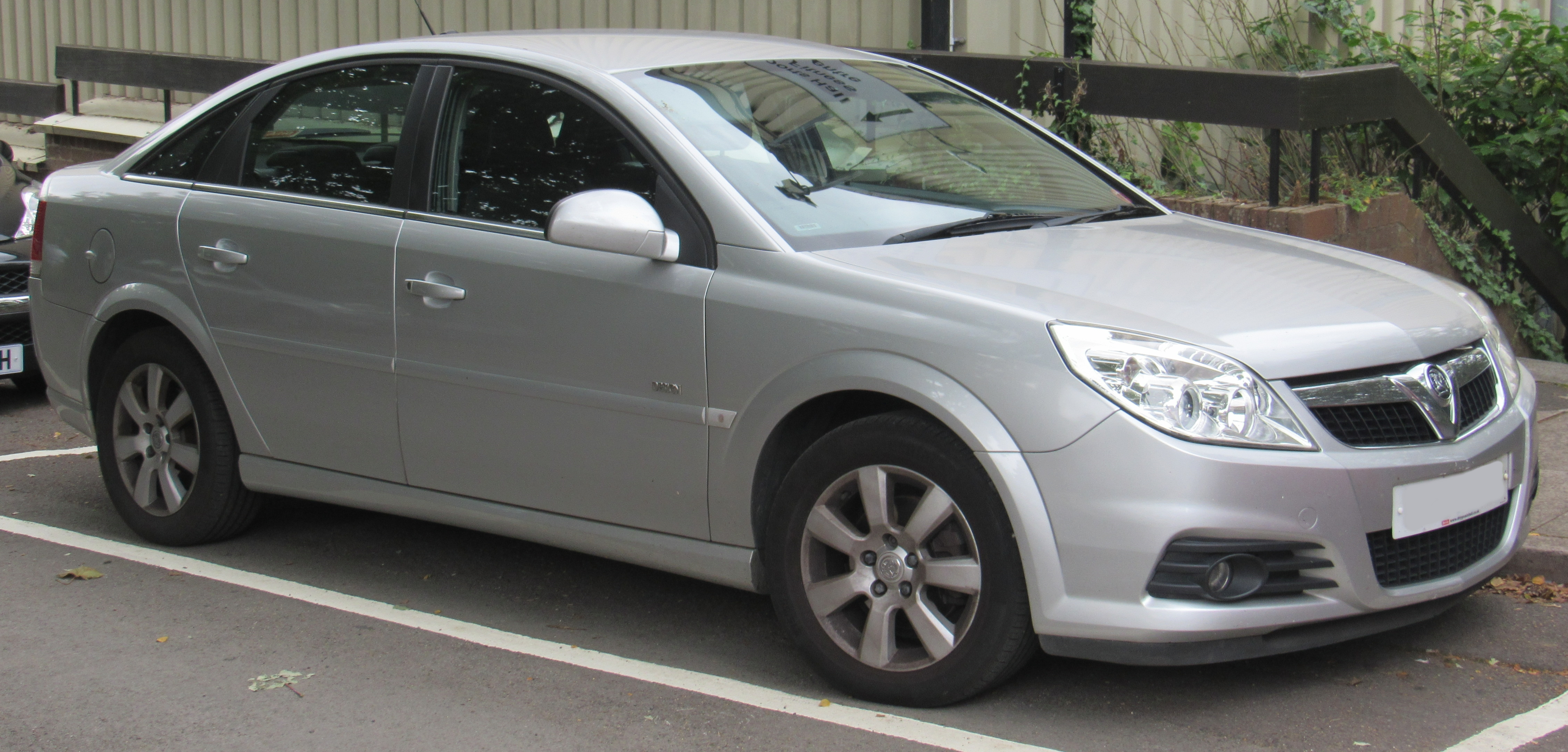
Vauxhall Vectra (facelift, United Kingdom)

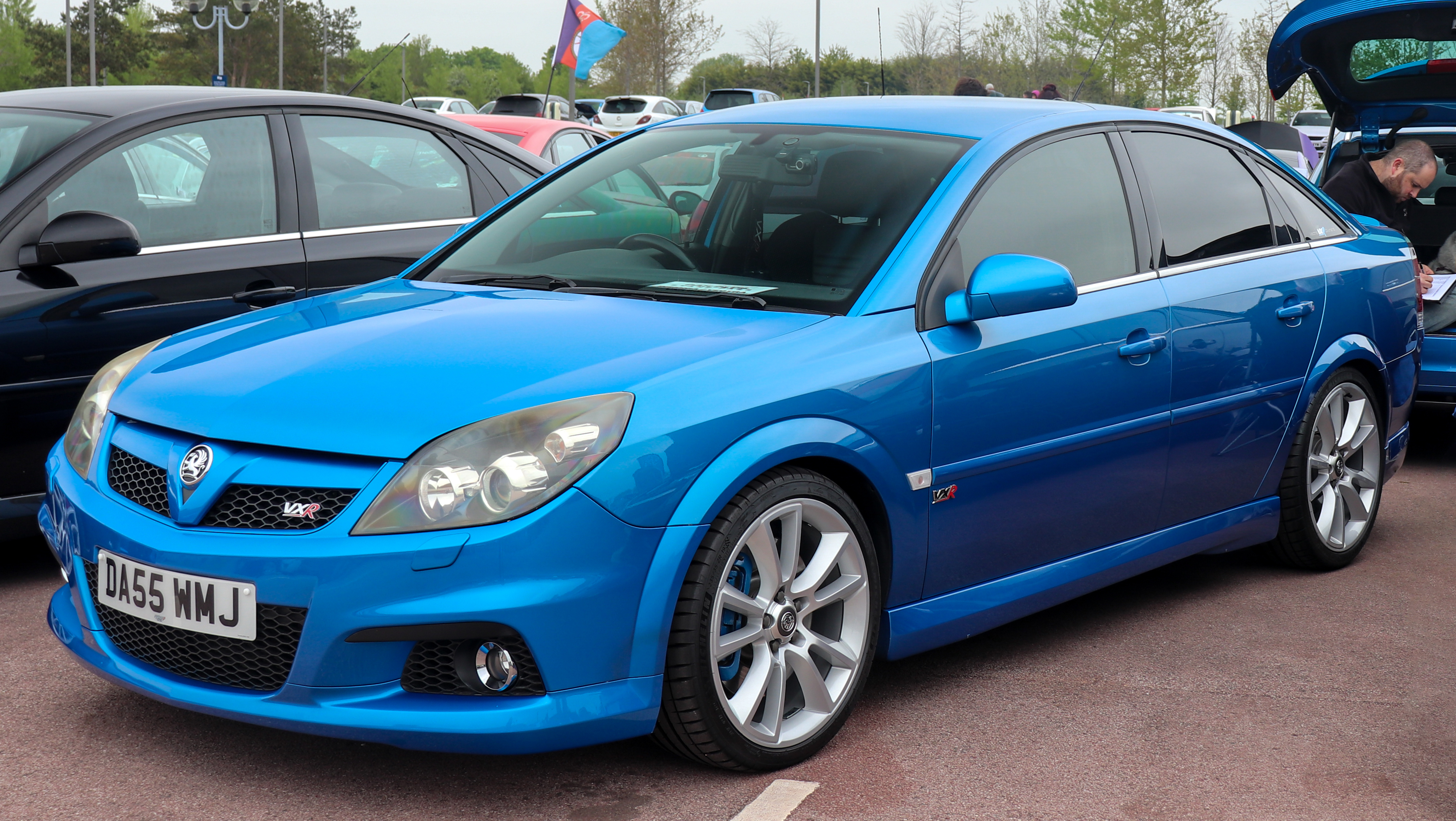
Vauxhall Vectra VXR (United Kingdom)

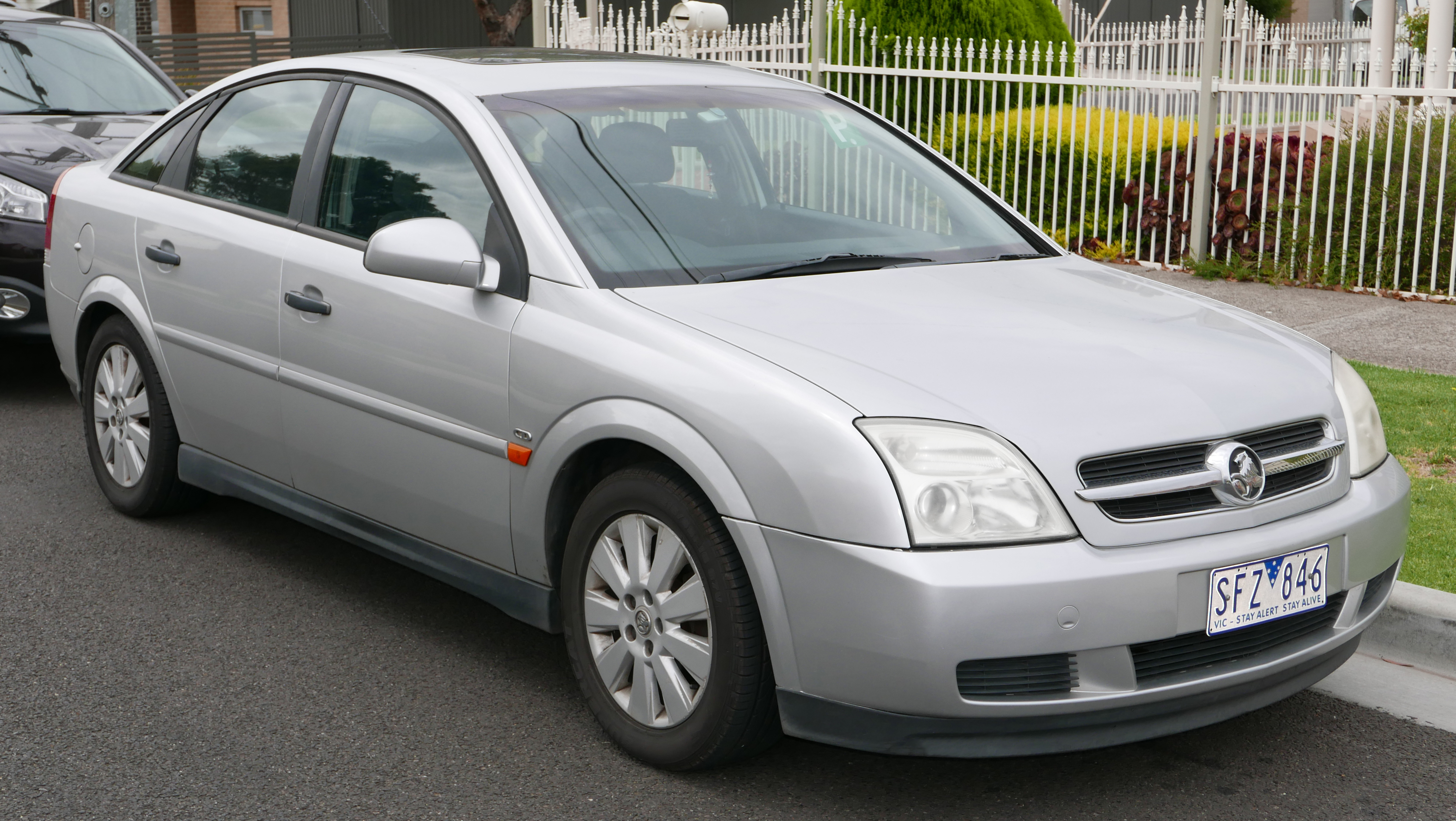
Holden Vectra (Australia and New Zealand)

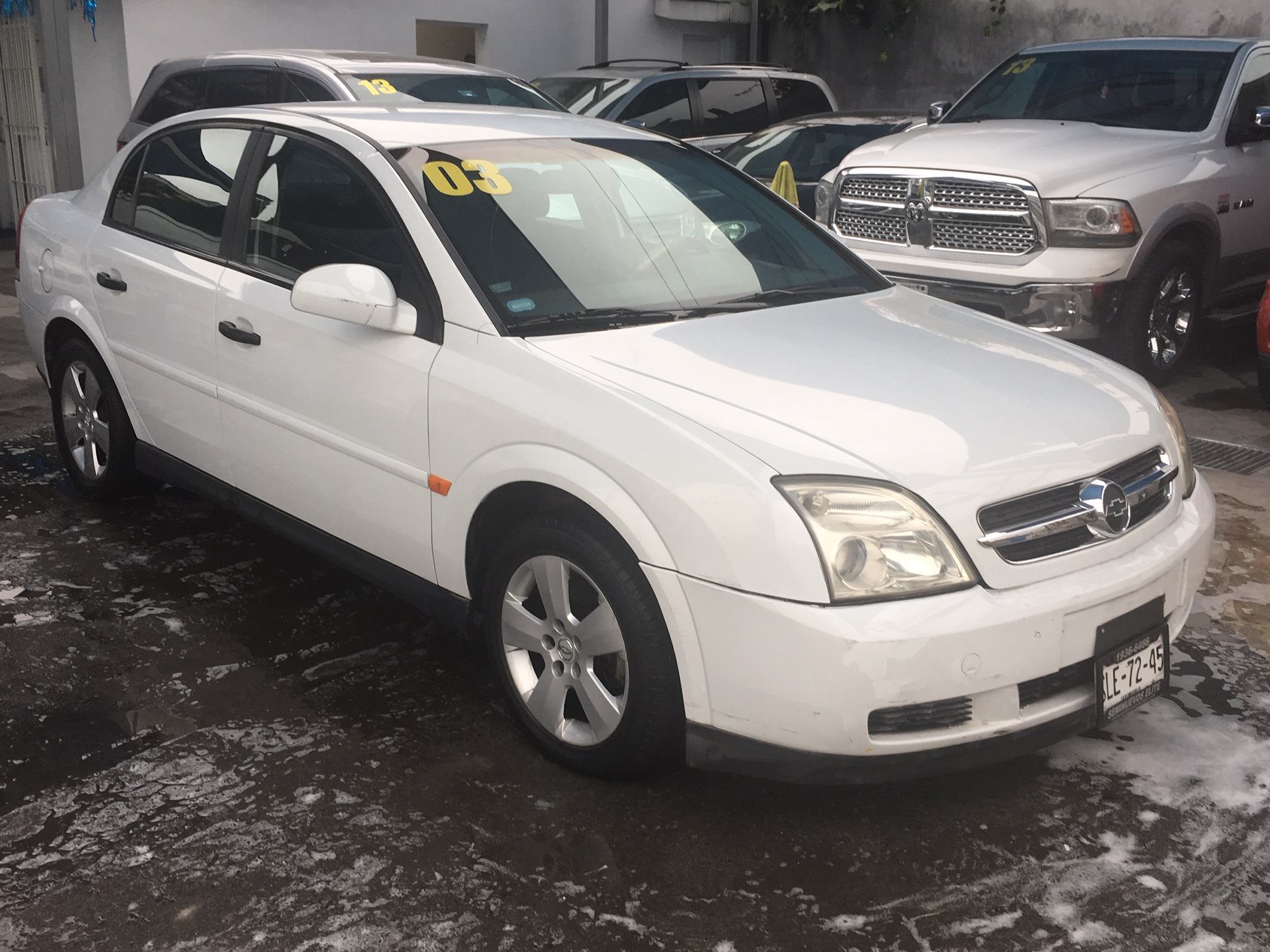
Chevrolet Vectra (pre-facelift, South America)

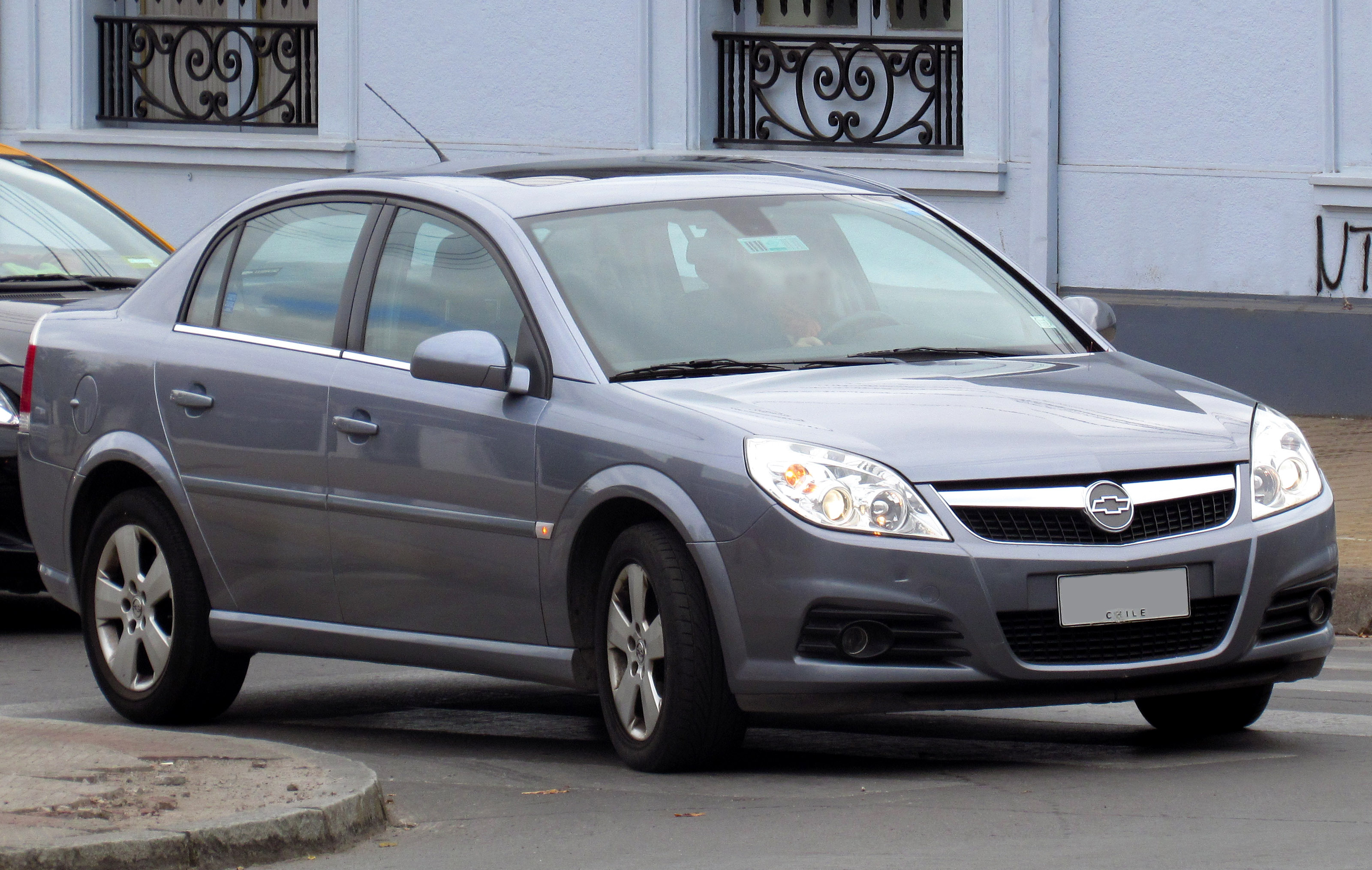
Chevrolet Vectra (facelift, South America)

=== Safety ===
ANCAP test results* Holden Vectra variant(s) as tested (2003)
Test	Score
Overall	4 /5 stars
Frontal offset	12.10/16
Side impact	15.76/16
Pole	2/2
Seat belt reminders	0/3
Whiplash protection	Not Assessed
Pedestrian protection	Poor
Electronic stability control	Optional

== Chevrolet Vectra D (2009–2012) ==
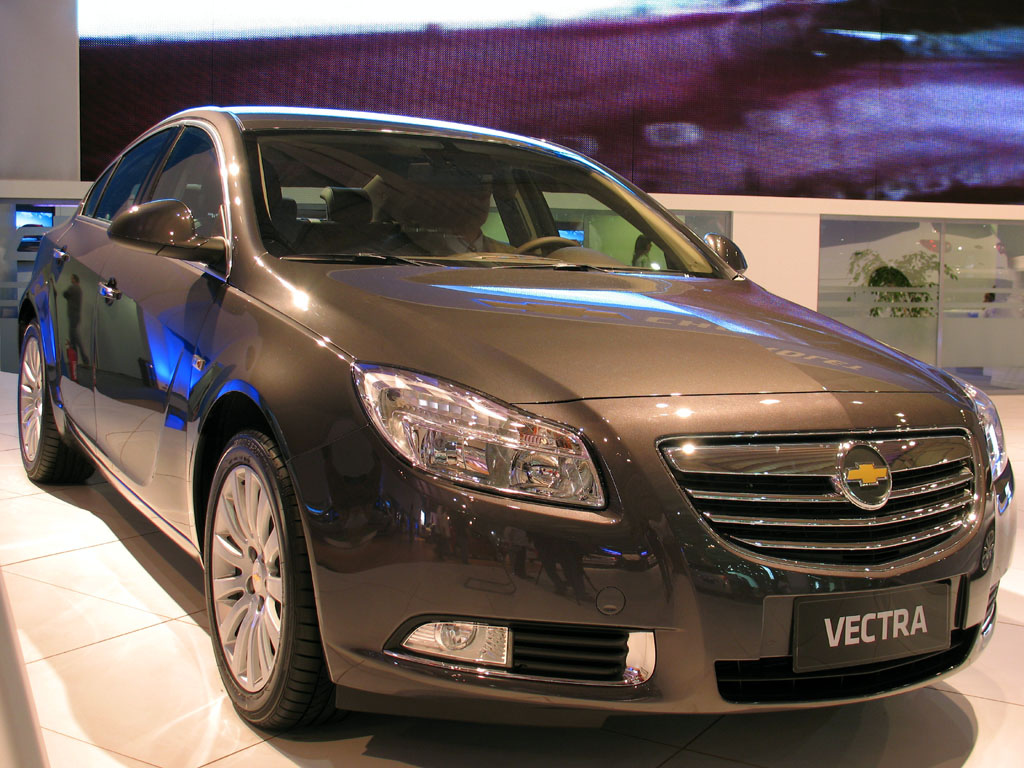
2009 Chevrolet Vectra (Chile)

The Chevrolet Vectra D is the rebadged Opel Insignia available only in the Chilean market. It is a very rare model of Chevrolet in Chile, with not many found. In June 2013, it was renamed the Opel Insignia along with a facelift, as the Chevrolet brand was being phased out in that market. In February 2017, Opel was sold to the PSA Group.

== Motorsport ==
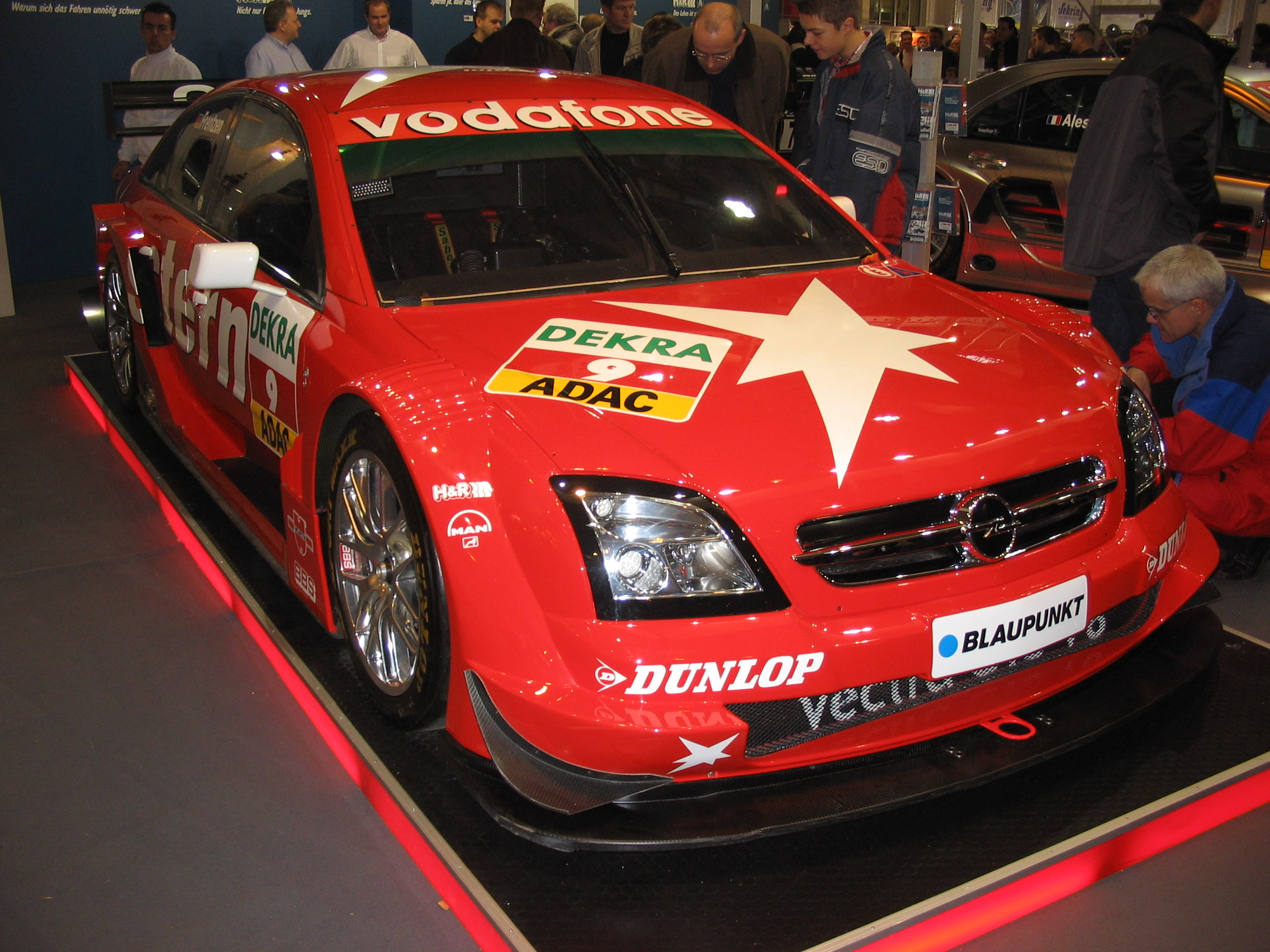
Opel Vectra C, built to the DTM rules

=== Vauxhall Vectra Challenge ===
From 1997 to 1999, a one-make series for the Vectra B ran in the UK as the Vauxhall Vectra SRI V6 Challenge.

A novelty of the series was the Celebrity Car. In 1997, this was driven by drivers such as Tiff Needell at Brands Hatch and Louise Aitken-Walker at Knockhill.

In 1998 and 1999, the series was a support event for the British Touring Car Championship. Many drivers to compete in this series would go on to race or had previously raced in the BTCC.

==== The LPG Vectra ====
The series was one of the first to experiment with alternative fuels in UK Motorsport with Mark Ticehurst driving a Liquified Petroleum Gas-powered entry in the 1999 Season. Ticehurst scored four wins in the car and would have been Champion had he been eligible for points. There were plans for Ticehurst to move up to the BTCC with this car for the 2000 Season but this never materialised.

=== Touring Car Racing ===
The Vectra was used in several touring car racing series.

In the 1990s and the early 2000s the Vectra B Super Touring took part in the British Touring Car Championship, the Asia-Pacific Touring Car Championship, the German Super Tourenwagen Cup, the Australian Super Touring Championship, the Japanese Touring Car Championship, the Italian Superturismo Championship, the French Supertouring Championship and the Swedish Touring Car Championship.

Uwe Alzen was third in Super Tourenwagen Cup in 1997 and 1998, and second in 1999; John Henderson was runner up in the 2000 Australian Super Touring Championship; John Cleland was British Touring Car Champion in 1995 and finished third in 1992 and fourth in 1993 and 1994; Yvan Muller was sixth in the 1999 British Touring Car Championship and fourth in 2000; and Nicklas Karlsson was third in the 2002 Swedish Touring Car Championship.

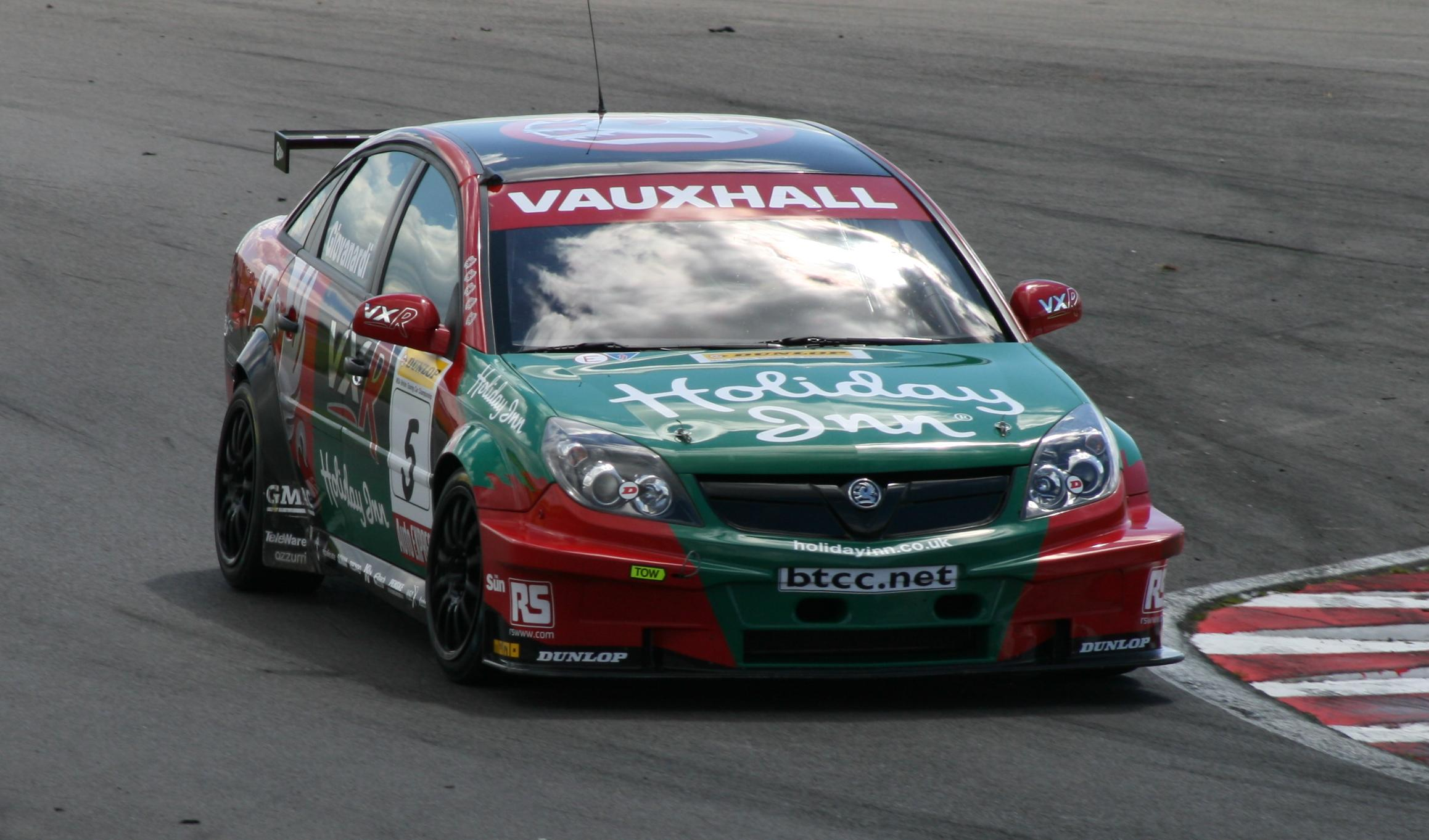
BTCC Vauxhall Vectra built to S2000 regulations.

==== The BTC Touring Vectra ====
A prototype Vectra C was built to the BTC Touring specifications in 2003 by Triple Eight Race Engineering, with the view to using it in the 2004 BTCC, but it was never raced, despite being shown publicly at the 2004 Birmingham Motor Show as the 'Vectra Diesel Concept'. The car got as far as a test at Albacete but proved less competitive than the Astra Coupe. The car appeared at the Autosport International Show in January 2007, disguised as the Super 2000 version that would make its BTCC debut that year.

==== The Super 2000 Vectra ====
After being replaced by the Astra H in the British Touring Car Championship, the Vectra C was introduced in 2007. Fabrizio Giovanardi was champion in 2007 and 2008. VX Racing competed in the season of 2009, with three Vectras, driven by Giovanardi, Matt Neal and Andrew Jordan.

==== Silhouette Racing ====
The Vectra has been used as a silhouette racing car: in the Stock Car Brasil in 2000 to 2003 (it was the champion for four seasons) and 2009, in the Argentine Top Race V6 since 2005 (Guillermo Ortelli was 2005 champion), and in the Deutsche Tourenwagen Masters in 2004 and 2005, with little success.

==== The Vectra Safety Car ====
In 1994, an Opel Vectra A was the official Formula 1 safety car during the 1994 San Marino Grand Prix. Driven by Max Angelelli, it was in front of Ayrton Senna for 5 laps before he crashed into Tamburello on lap 7.
