= Cadillac BLS =

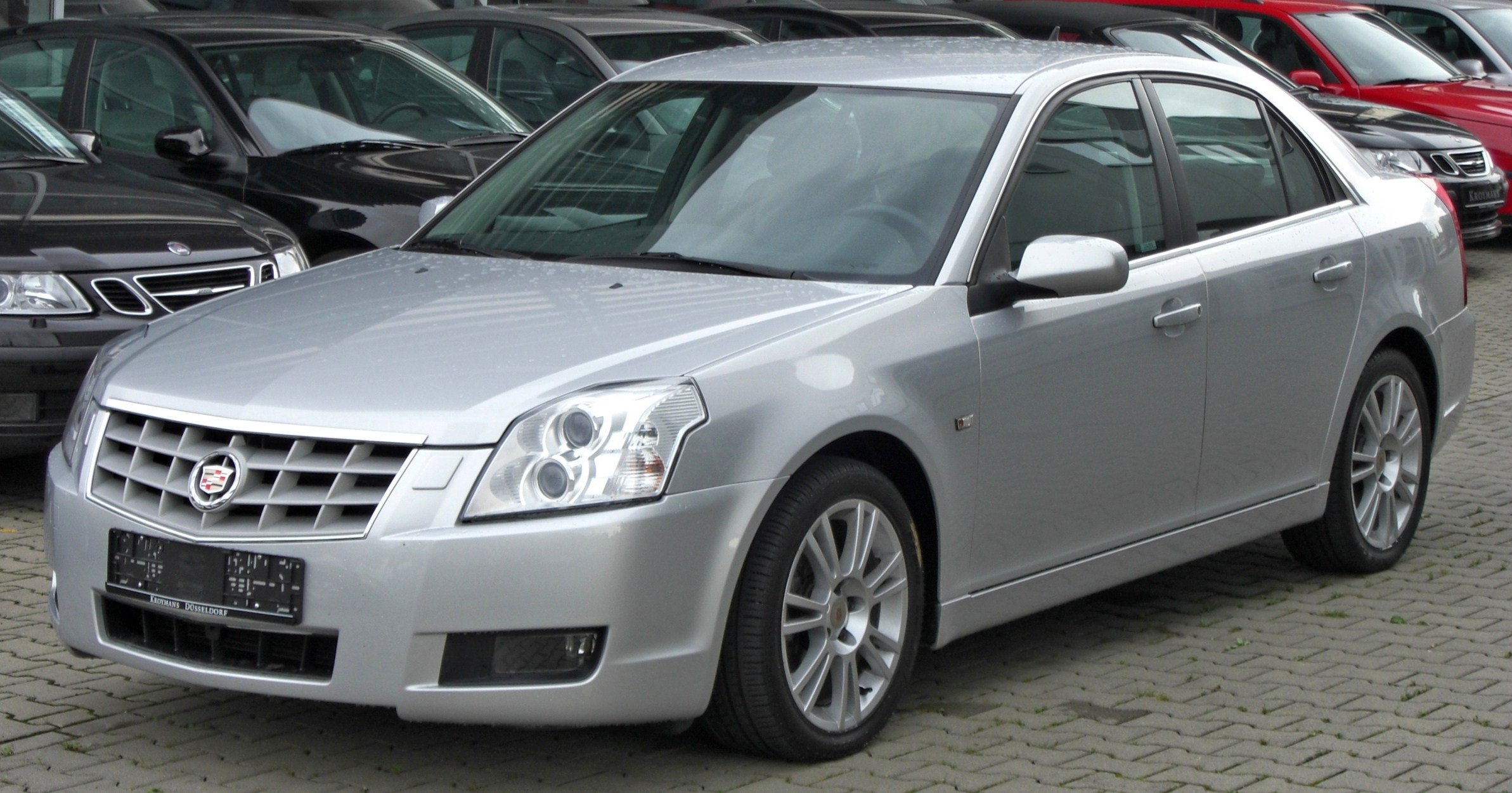

Overview
- Manufacturer: Saab (General Motors)
- Production: 2005–2009 (Sweden); 2009–2010 (Russia)
- Assembly: Sweden: Trollhättan (Saab Automobile); Russia: Kaliningrad (Avtotor)
- Designer: Bryan Nesbitt

Body and chassis
- Class: Compact executive car (D)
- Body style: 4-door saloon 5-door estate
- Layout: FF layout
- Platform: GM Epsilon platform
- Related: Fiat Croma; Chevrolet Malibu; Opel Signum; Opel Vectra C Saab 9-3; Saturn Aura

Powertrain
- Engine: Petrol: 2.0 L Ecotec LK9 turbo I4; 2.8 L HFV6 turbo V6; Diesel: 1.9 L Fiat JTD turbodiesel I4
- Transmission: 5-speed automatic 6-speed automatic 5-speed manual 6-speed manual

Dimensions
- Wheelbase: 2,680 mm (105.5 in)
- Length: 4,680 mm (184.3 in); 4,716 mm (185.7 in) (estate)
- Width: 1,750 mm (68.9 in); 1,752 mm (69.0 in) (estate)
- Height: 1,470 mm (57.9 in); 1,543 mm (60.7 in) (estate)

Chronology
- Predecessor: Cadillac Cimarron
- Successor: Cadillac ATS

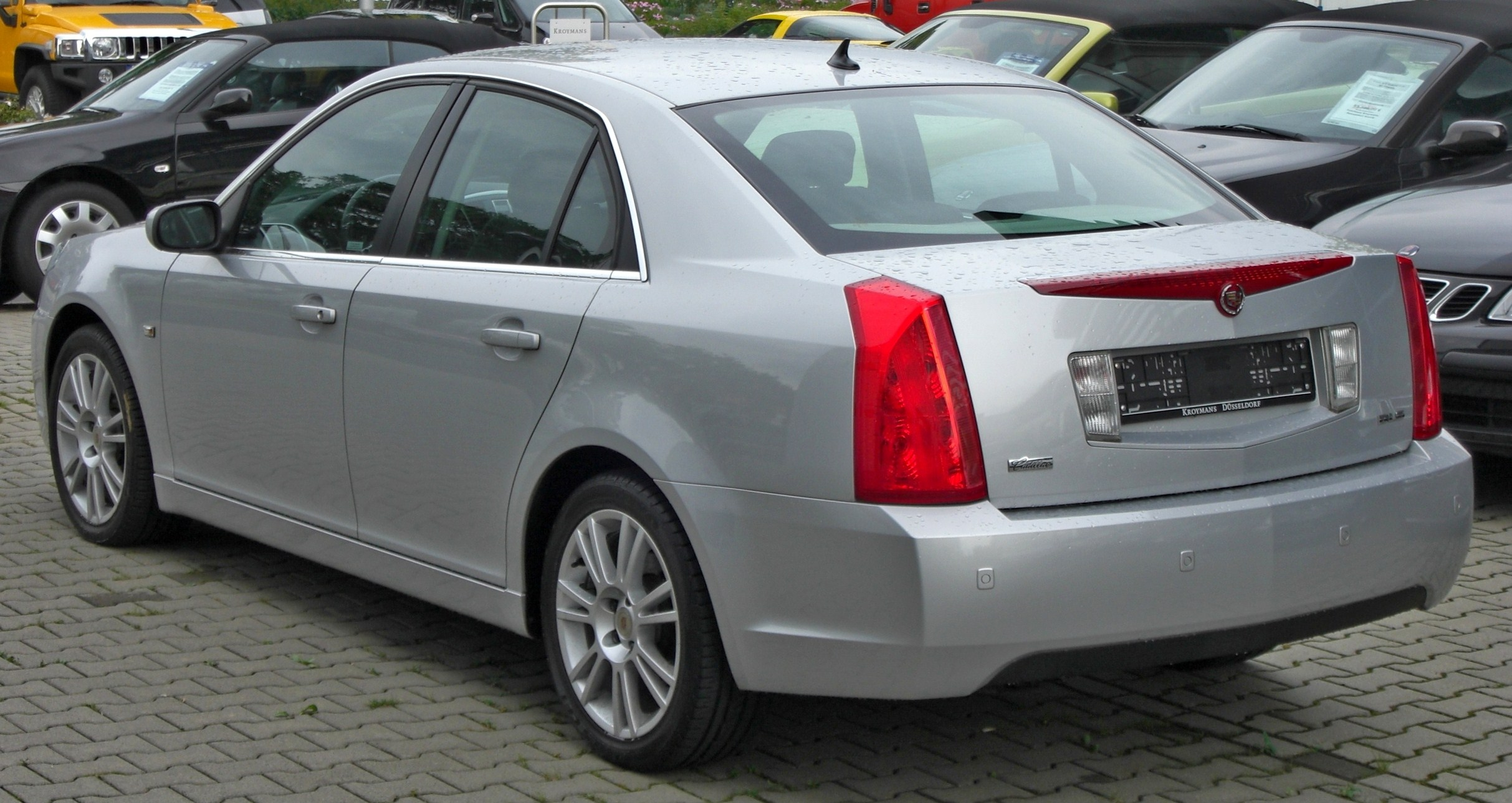
BLS Sedan rear

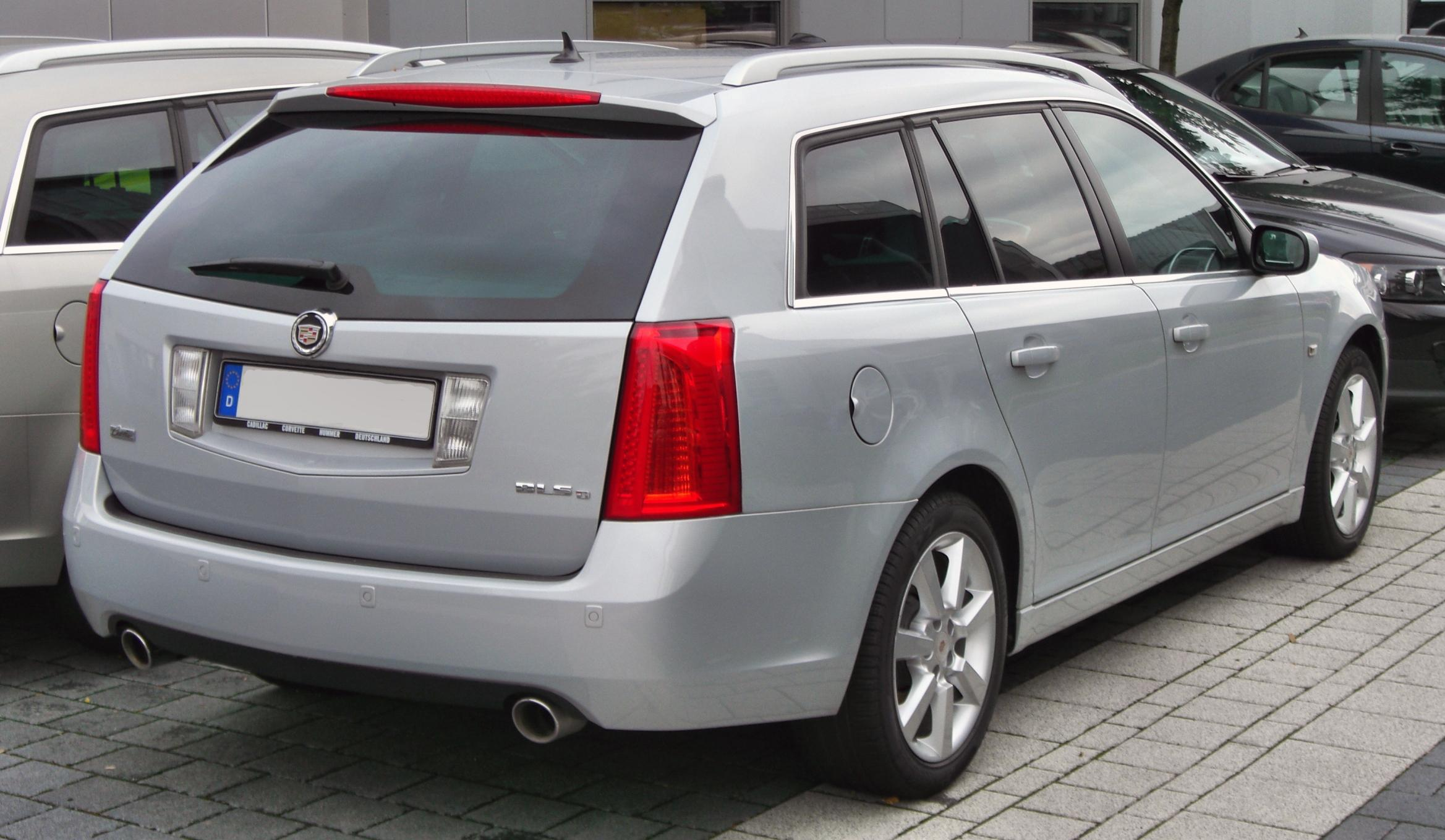
Cadillac BLS Estate rear

The Cadillac BLS is a compact executive car that was marketed in Europe by Cadillac, sharing General Motors' Epsilon architecture, as a restyled variant of the Saab 9-3. Development was carried out by Saab and the car was manufactured in Trollhättan, Sweden, alongside the Saab 9-3 and the Saab 9-5. Sales of the saloon began in March 2006, with an estate joining the line for 2007. Starting in 2007, the BLS was sold in the Middle East, Mexico, South Africa and South Korea.

BLS production reached 3,257 in 2006 and 2,772 in 2007. Production ended in 2009. Until the GT4 was introduced in 2023, the BLS was the only Cadillac never sold in North America.

== Features ==
The BLS was available with a diesel engine (a 1.9 L turbocharged four-cylinder) and two petrol engines (a 2.8 L turbocharged V6 and a 2.0 L available with two power levels).

At 184.3 in (4,681 mm) in overall length, the BLS was almost six inches shorter than the CTS, the smallest Cadillac that was available in the United States or Canada.

Engines:

- 1.9 L Fiat turbodiesel I4 16v, 150 bhp (110 kW)
- 1.9 L Fiat turbodiesel I4 16v, 180 bhp (132 kW) (2007-)
- 2.0 L Ecotec LK9 I4, mid-pressure turbo, 175 bhp (129 kW)
- 2.0 L Ecotec LK9 I4, high-pressure turbo, 210 bhp (154 kW)
- 2.0 T FlexPower 200 bhp (147 kW)
- 2.8 L HFV6 V6, turbo, 250 bhp (184 kW)

== Differences from the Saab 9-3 ==
Though a large percentage of BLS components were shared with the Saab 9-3, the BLS was differentiated from the 9-3 throughout the exterior and interior.

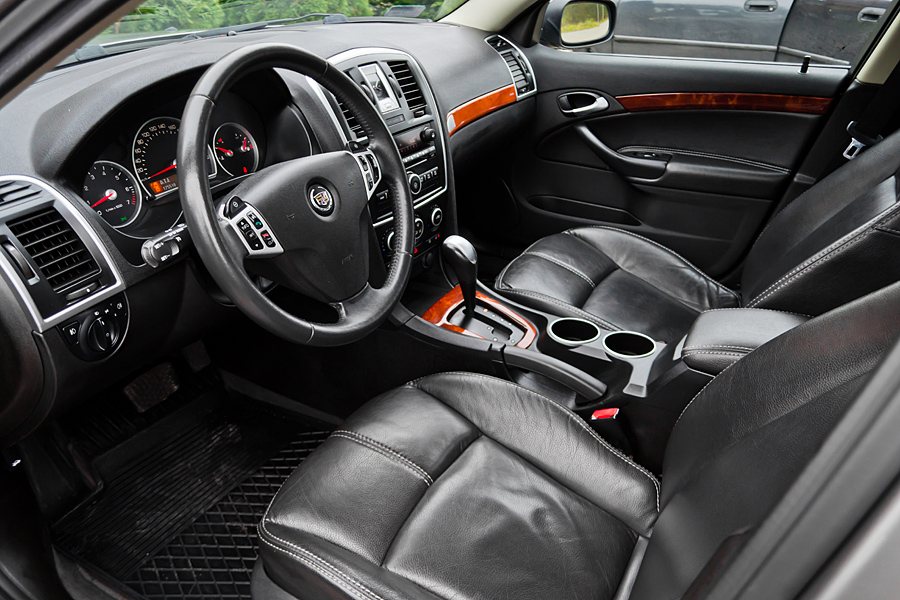
Interior

- Unique exterior sheet metal and lighting elements on front and rear.
- Different wheel options.
- Unique upper dashboard design with an integrated analogue clock between central air vents.
- Redesigned centre console with dual cupholders, eliminating the 9-3s flip-out cupholder.
- Traditionally mounted ignition switch in steering column.
- Unique instrument cluster gauge design. White background lighting instead of green.
- Additional seat stitching.
- Unique headrests on front seats.
- Cadillac logo replaced Saab logo on engine covers, steering wheel and first-aid kits

== Reviews ==
- Auto Express
  'The BLS is OK, but offers nothing new in a market overflowing with talent.'
- Evo
  [+] Stylish and quiet
  [-] Pushes no boundaries.
- Honest John
  Positives: Based on the Saab 9-3 so decent handling. Well proven mechanicals. Saab-grade safety.
  Negatives: The ride is far from forgiving. Automatic doesn't work well with the V6 turbo, which also has overly light steering.
- Verdict On Cars
  'Average. It's built in Europe, shares most of its underpinnings with a Saab and will never see America - meet the strangest Cadillac ever.'

== Name ==
The BLS is known by many as the "Bob Lutz Special" - a reference to Vice Chairman Bob Lutz who oversaw all GM product development at the time. Lutz, a supporter of badge engineering, wanted to leverage the Saab 9-3 to fill holes in Cadillac's product range.

The reference to Bob Lutz can be viewed both as support and as criticism of his strategy. While the BLS was a market failure, many of the techniques of badge engineering employed in the BLS resulted in other GM product successes, most notably a significant improvement in overall passenger car product quality and performance output.

According to GM, BLS stands for "B-segment Luxury Sedan", being in a smaller class than the CTS mid-size saloon. This is consistent with the Seville Luxury Sedan, later known as the Cadillac SLS in China.
