= Saturn L-Series =

Mid-size car

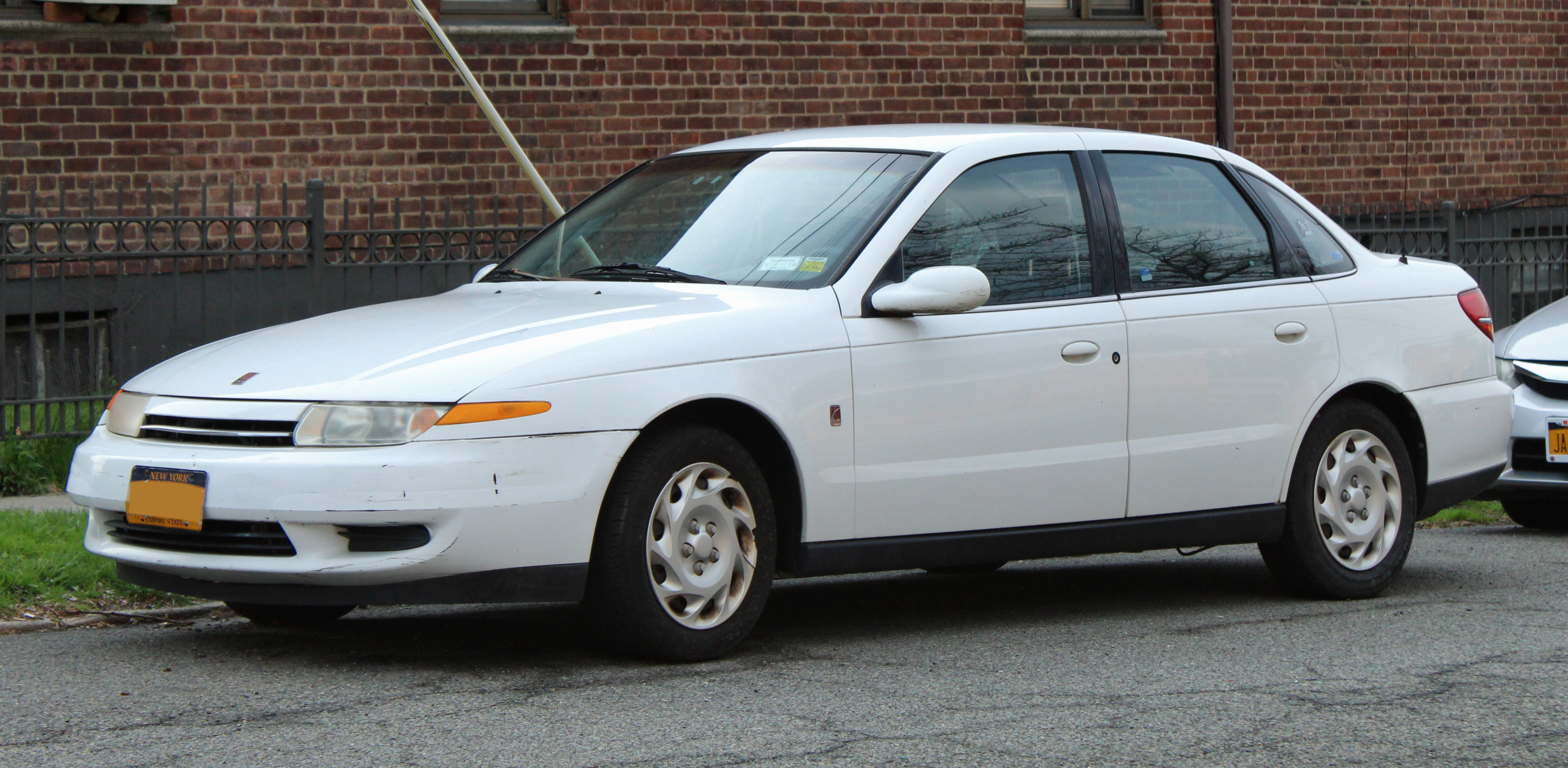

Overview
- Manufacturer: Saturn Corporation
- Also called: Saturn L100/200/300; Saturn LS/LS1/LS2; Saturn LW1/LW2; Saturn LW200/300
- Production: May 1999 – June 17, 2004
- Model years: 2000–2005
- Assembly: United States: Wilmington, Delaware (Wilmington Assembly)

Body and chassis
- Class: Mid-size
- Body style: 4-door sedan (LS); 5-door station wagon (LW)
- Layout: Transverse front-engine, front-wheel drive
- Platform: GM2900 platform
- Related: Opel Vectra B Saab 9-3; Saab 9-5

Powertrain
- Engine: 2.2 L L61 I4; 3.0 L L81 V6
- Transmission: 5-speed F35 manual; 4-speed GM 4T40-E automatic; 4-speed GM 4T45-E automatic

Dimensions
- Wheelbase: 106.5 in (2,705 mm)
- Length: 190.4 in (4,836 mm)
- Width: 69.0 in (1,753 mm) (2000–2002); 69.4 in (1,763 mm) (2003–2005)
- Height: 56.4 in (1,432 mm) (sedan); 57.3 in (1,455 mm) (wagon)

Chronology
- Successor: Saturn Aura

The Saturn L-Series is a line of automobiles, sedans and station wagons that were made by Saturn Corporation in Wilmington, Delaware for 2000–2005 model years.

Poor sales of the L-Series cars caused GM to cancel the line for 2005. The first L-Series car was built in May 1999, and the last one rolled off the Wilmington line on June 17, 2004, after a short run of 2005 models. About 406,300 L-Series cars were built in this period. The plant was then retooled to build the Pontiac Solstice and Saturn Sky roadsters.

The replacement for the L-Series, the Saturn Aura, arrived in August 2006 for the 2007 model-year. The Aura was built on the Epsilon platform, shared with the Pontiac G6, Saab 9-3, and Chevrolet Malibu.

== Model history ==
- 2000: In May 1999 for the 2000 model year, Saturn Corporation introduced the Saturn L-Series as a lineup of sedan and station wagon vehicle models – three sedan models and two station wagon models. The sedan L-Series models were the four-cylinder LS and LS1, and the six-cylinder LS2. The station wagons were the four-cylinder LW1 and the V6 LW2. The base LS sedan, without a wagon counterpart, came equipped with a 5-speed manual transmission, manual windows and locks, air conditioning, and an AM/FM stereo. The LS1/LW1 added power windows, mirrors and locks with keyless entry, heated mirrors, and other comfort features. The LS2/LW2 featured additional standard amenities including fog lights, as well as the more powerful V6 engine and 4-speed automatic transmission; the latter was optional on the four-cylinder models. Anti-lock brakes with traction control was an option on all models.
- 2001: For the 2001 model year, all of the L-Series received new model designations because of a naming dispute with Lincoln (Lexus also used the LS name at this time). The LS was renamed the L100, the LS1 became the L200, and the LS2 became the L300. For the station wagons, the LW1 was renamed the LW200 and the LW2 was renamed LW300. All models received a larger fuel tank of 15.7 US gal (59.4 L; 13.1 imp gal) and shoulder belts for the center rear seat position. Head curtain side airbags became available later in the model year, but only on the sedans.

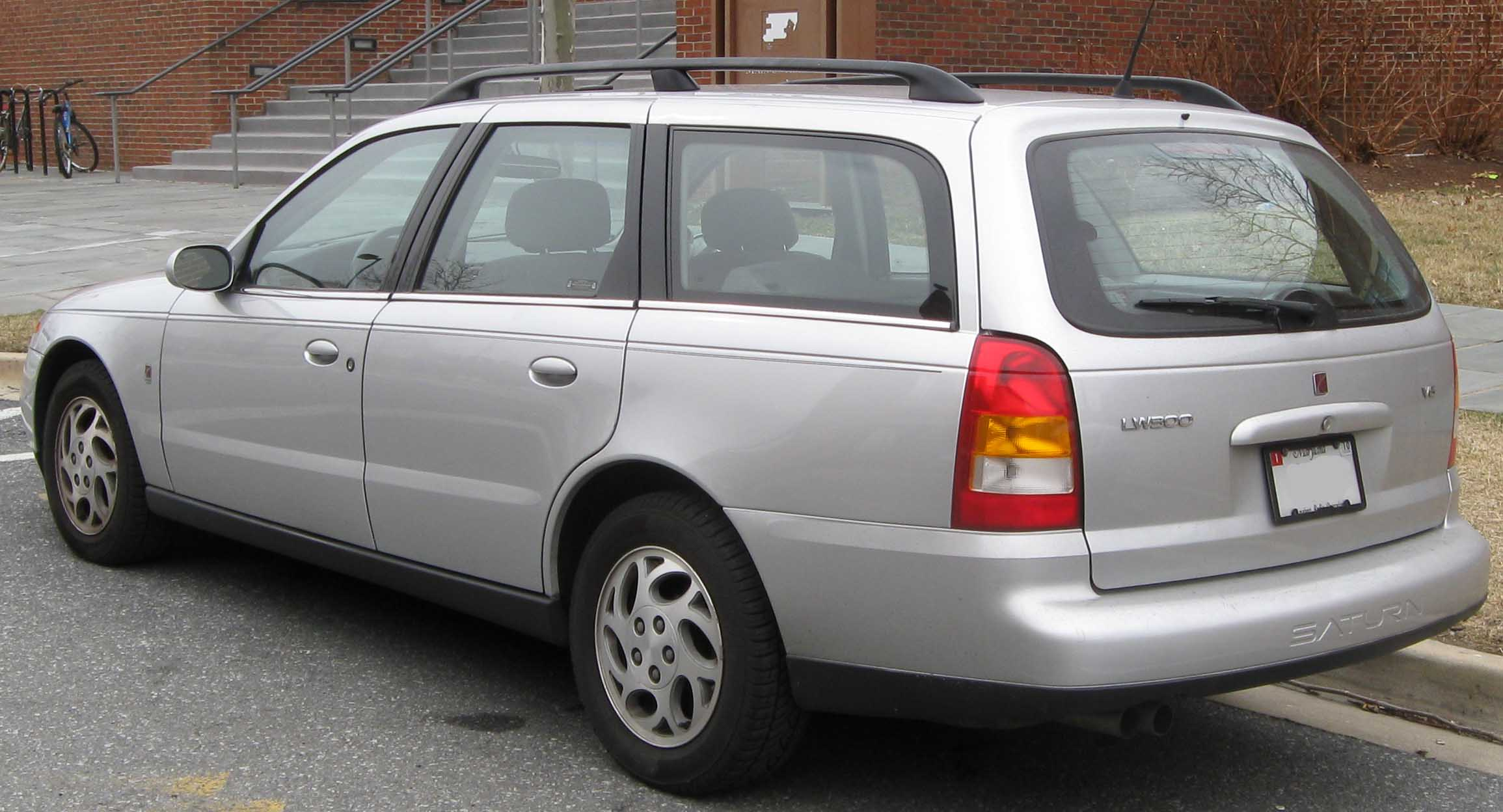
2000–2002 Wagon

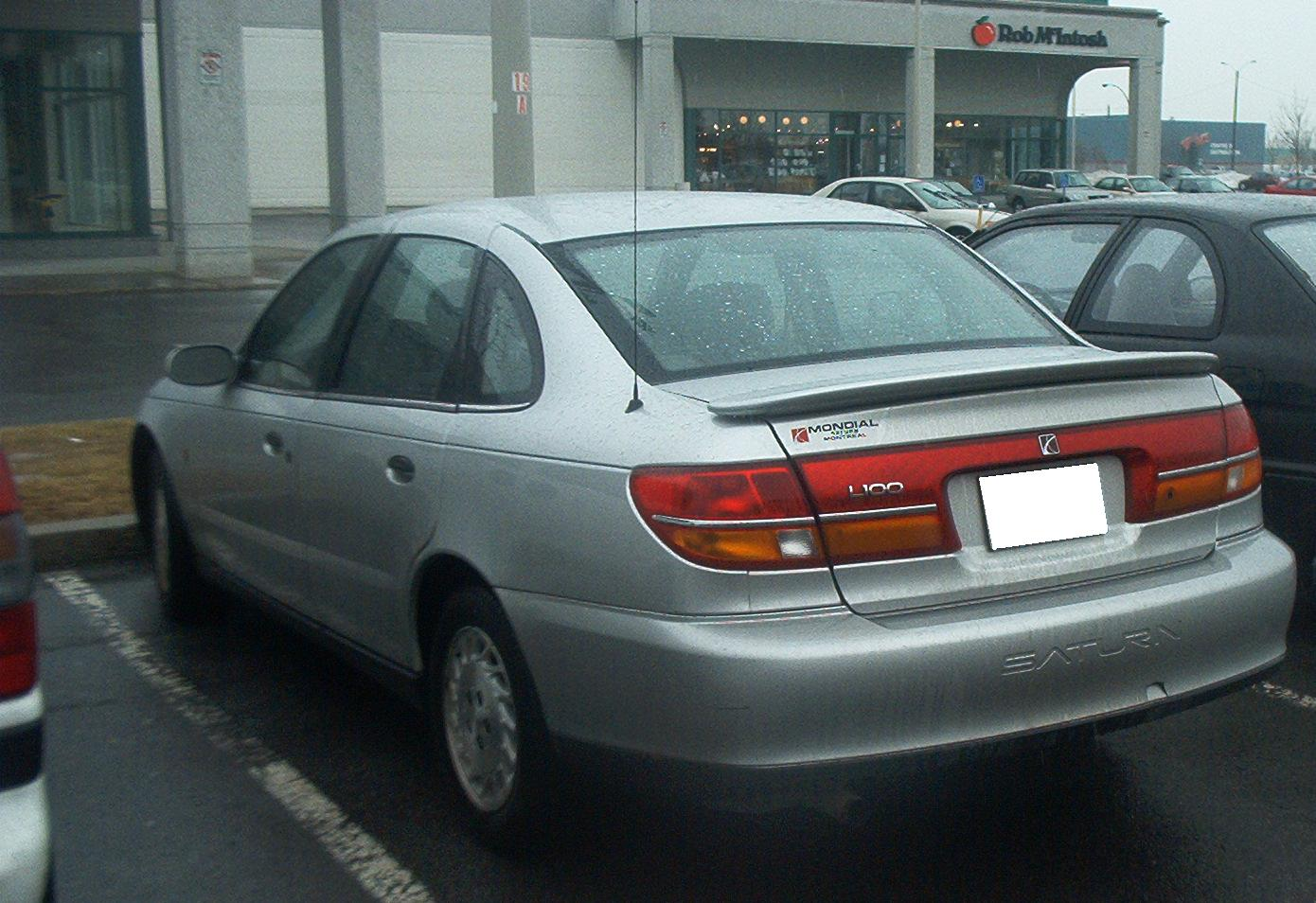
2000–2002 Saturn L-Series (rear view)

- 2002: Anti-lock brakes with traction control were standard this year, along with curtain side airbags (sedans only), and traction control.
  A new six-spoke chrome alloy wheel became available, as well as automatic air conditioning and a rear DVD entertainment later in the model year. The Saturn L100 was discontinued after the 2002 model year.
- 2003: Sedans were facelifted, front and rear; wagons received the new front along with new taillights and wagons and sedans now had side curtain airbags standard. Silver dash trim replaced wood trim, and a new available alloy wheel design (borrowed from Saab) were also both added for the 2003 model year. More sound insulation in the doors, dash and floor, plus thicker side windows and windshield lowered interior noise for 2003, compared to the 2000-2002 models. Automatic climate control was still an option. The L100 sedan was canceled, and anti-lock brakes with traction control were once again made optional.
- 2004: Anti-lock brakes and traction control were standard again, the automatic air conditioning was discontinued (leaving all models with the manual air conditioning), and the manual transmission was dropped, leaving all models with a four-speed automatic. The "L200" and "LW200" names were discontinued; all L-Series sedan and wagon models were renamed "L300," adopting a trim level structure like that of Saturn's Ion compact. The previous L200/LW200 were now the L300.1, powered by a higher output version of the 2.2L Ecotec and having no available options. The L300.2 was powered by the 3.0L V6 and had the same range of options as before. The L300.3 got chromed alloy wheels and a standard power driver's seat, and was unique in offering the "Premium Choice Package." This offered the choice between OnStar, rear DVD entertainment, or (on sedans) a power sunroof at no extra charge.
- 2005: As a result of poor sales (nearly cut to a quarter of the volume of 2000), wagons were discontinued for this model year and the lineup was trimmed to one model, the L300.2 sedan. The only option was a power moonroof, as all other options were dropped to reduce production complexity. The last L300 rolled off the Wilmington Assembly line on June 17, 2004.

== Quality issues ==
The L-Series was troubled early in production by a number of quality issues, often related to engine failures, transmission failures and overall fit and finish issues. Consumers reported repeat problems with tire noise and vibration linked to poorly designed control arm bushings and nonadjustable rear alignments. A retrofit kit was released to address these concerns.

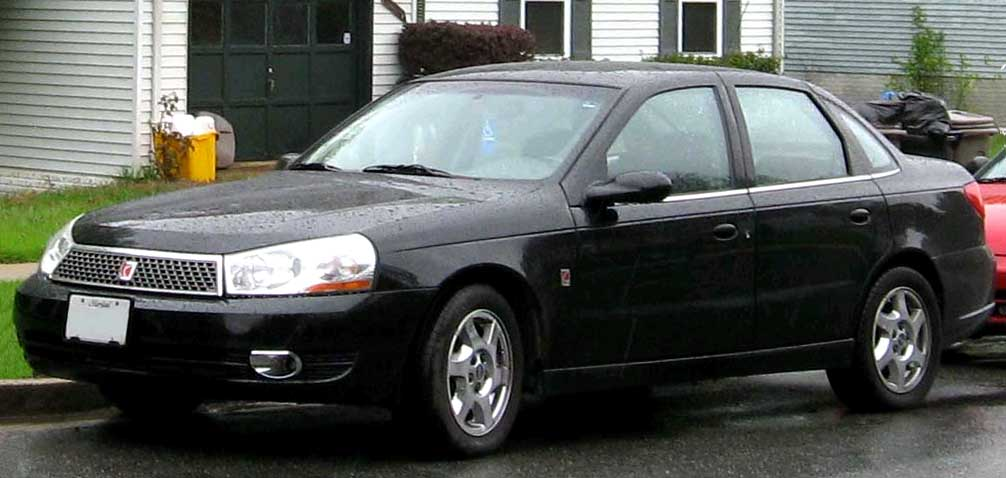
2003–2005 facelift

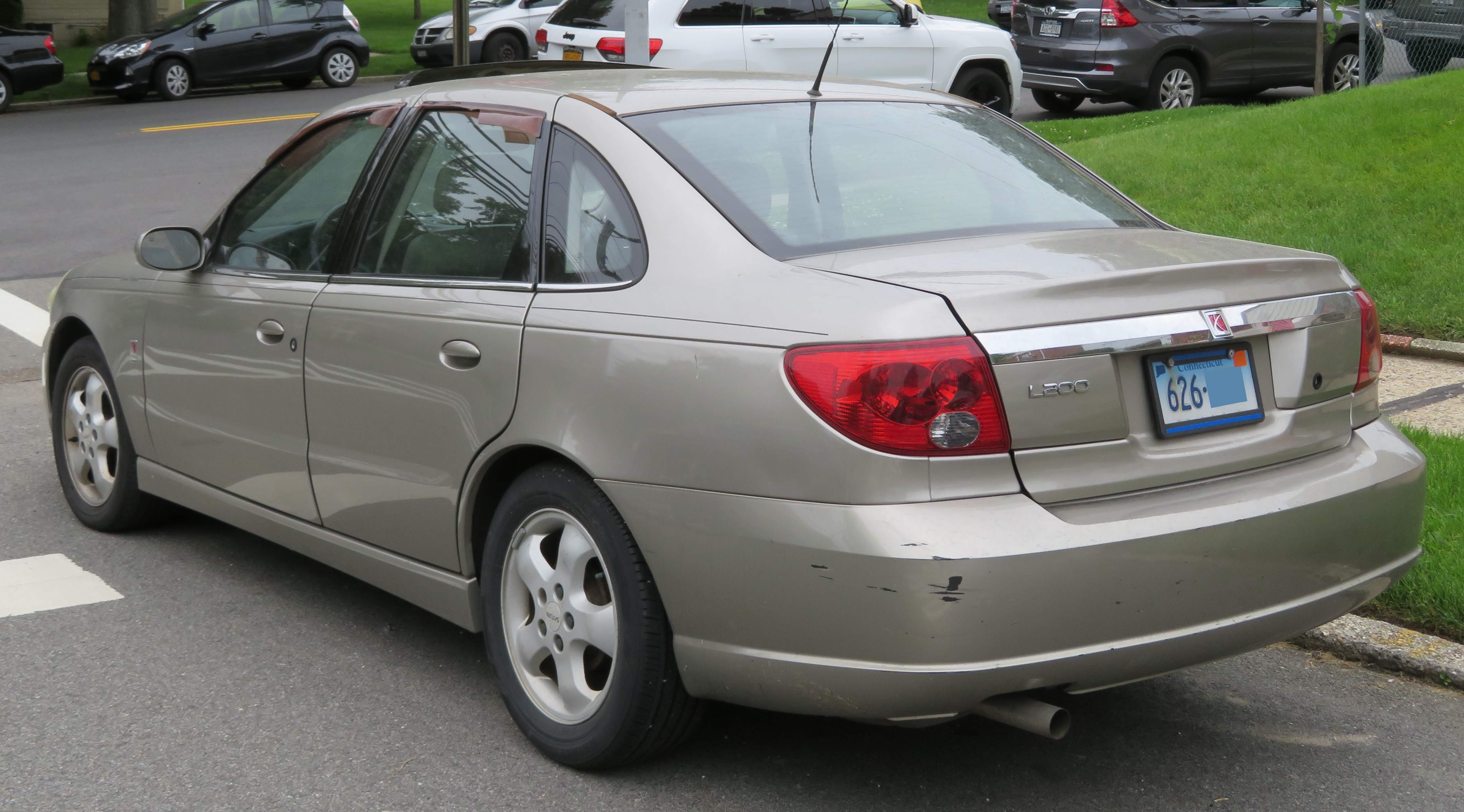
2003–2005 Saturn L-Series (rear view)

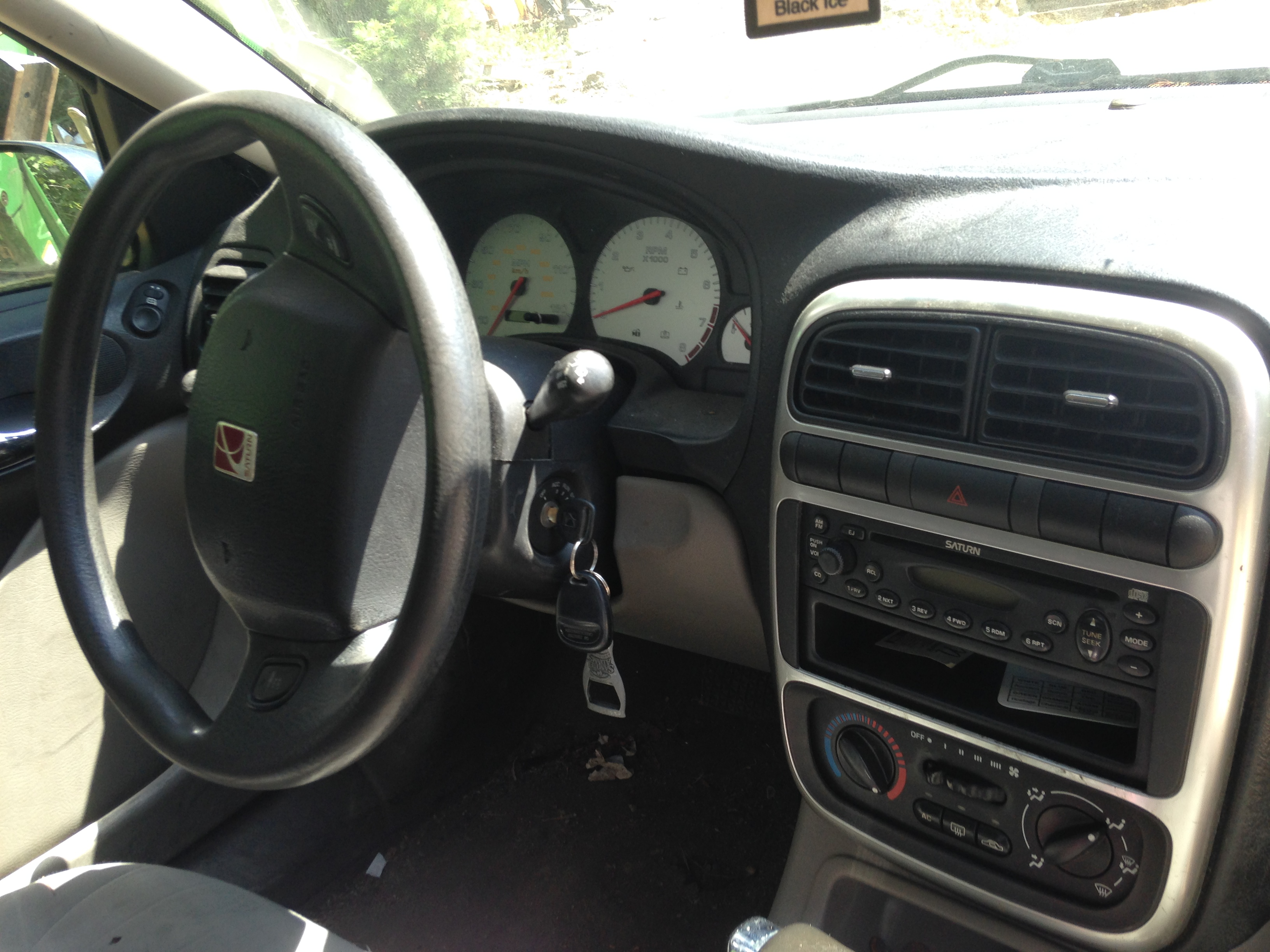
Interior of a 2003 Saturn L200 sedan

In 2005, a recall was issued pursuant to a defect petition by the North Carolina Consumers Council, a consumer nonprofit advocacy organization, alleging repeat brake and tail light failures. The resulting recall affected more than 300,000 vehicles in the United States and Canada. Later that same year, the North Carolina Consumers Council petitioned for an investigation into timing chain failures and subsequent engine failures across the model lineup for vehicles using the 2.2L engine. The resulting recall affected only a small number of vehicles built in a four-month period in late 2000 and early 2001. The organization reported that complaints of engine failure due to a defective timing chain design persisted until at least 2012 and requests for recall expansions have largely been ignored. The organization has gone so far as to make its first recommendation against the purchase of a vehicle in its more than forty-year history due in part to this timing chain defect.

== Safety ==
=== Insurance Institute for Highway Safety (IIHS) ===
2000–2005 L-Series IIHS scores
Moderate overlap frontal offset	Acceptable
Small overlap frontal offset	Not tested
Side impact	Poor
Roof strength	Marginal

=== NHTSA ===
2000–2005 L-Series NHTSA scores
Year	Frontal driver	Frontal passenger	Side driver	Side passenger	4x2 rollover
2000	4/5 stars	5/5 stars	2/5 stars	4/5 stars	Not Rated
2001	4/5 stars	5/5 stars	2/5 stars	4/5 stars	Not Rated
2002	4/5 stars	5/5 stars	3/5 stars	5/5 stars	4/5 stars
2003	4/5 stars	5/5 stars	3/5 stars	5/5 stars	4/5 stars
2004	4/5 stars	5/5 stars	3/5 stars	5/5 stars	4/5 stars
2005	4/5 stars	5/5 stars	3/5 stars	5/5 stars	4/5 stars
