= Cadillac GT4 =

Compact crossover SUV

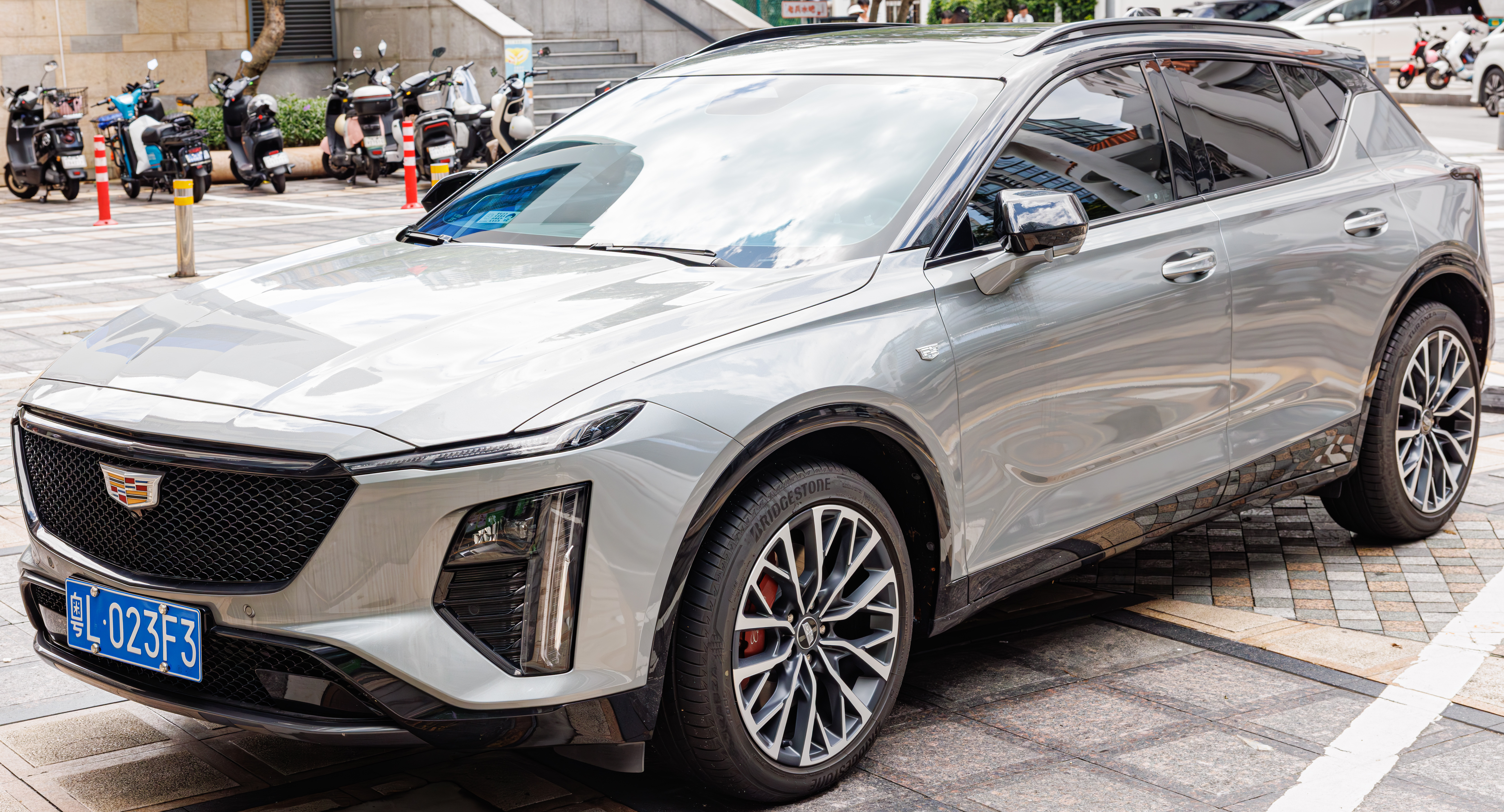

Overview
- Manufacturer: SAIC-GM
- Production: 2023–2026
- Assembly: China: Yantai, Shandong (SAIC-GM)

Body and chassis
- Class: Compact luxury crossover SUV
- Body style: 5-door SUV
- Layout: Front-engine, front-wheel-drive or all-wheel-drive
- Platform: E2XX platform
- Related: Cadillac XT4

Powertrain
- Engine: Gasoline: 1.5 L turbo I4; 2.0 L LSY turbo I4
- Transmission: 9-speed 9T50 automatic
- Hybrid drivetrain: MHEV

Dimensions
- Wheelbase: 2,800 mm (110.2 in)
- Length: 4,633 mm (182.4 in)
- Width: 1,878 mm (73.9 in)
- Height: 1,536 mm (60.5 in)
- Curb weight: 1,610–1,760 kg (3,549–3,880 lb)

The Cadillac GT4 is a compact luxury crossover SUV manufactured by General Motors under the Cadillac brand. It is sold exclusively in China.

== Overview ==
The GT4 was unveiled on May 29, 2023 and is similar to a XT4, but has different dimensions including a slightly longer wheelbase and has sleeker styling and a lower roofline. Its interior features a 33-inch instrument cluster and center infotainment combination display, heated and ventilated seats, a 15-speaker AKG audio system, surround-view camera system, digital rearview mirror, and a color heads-up display. The XT4 uses a multi-link independent rear suspension.

The GT4 is powered by a 1.5-liter or 2.0-liter turbocharged inline-four engine with front wheel drive and all wheel drive options. The 1.5-liter turbocharged engine produces 208 horsepower (155 kW; 211 PS) and 199 lb⋅ft (270 N⋅m) of torque, while the 2.0-liter turbocharged engine produces 233 horsepower (174 kW; 236 PS) and 258 lb⋅ft (350 N⋅m) of torque. Both engines operate with a 48-volt mild hybrid system and drive the wheels through a nine-speed automatic transmission.

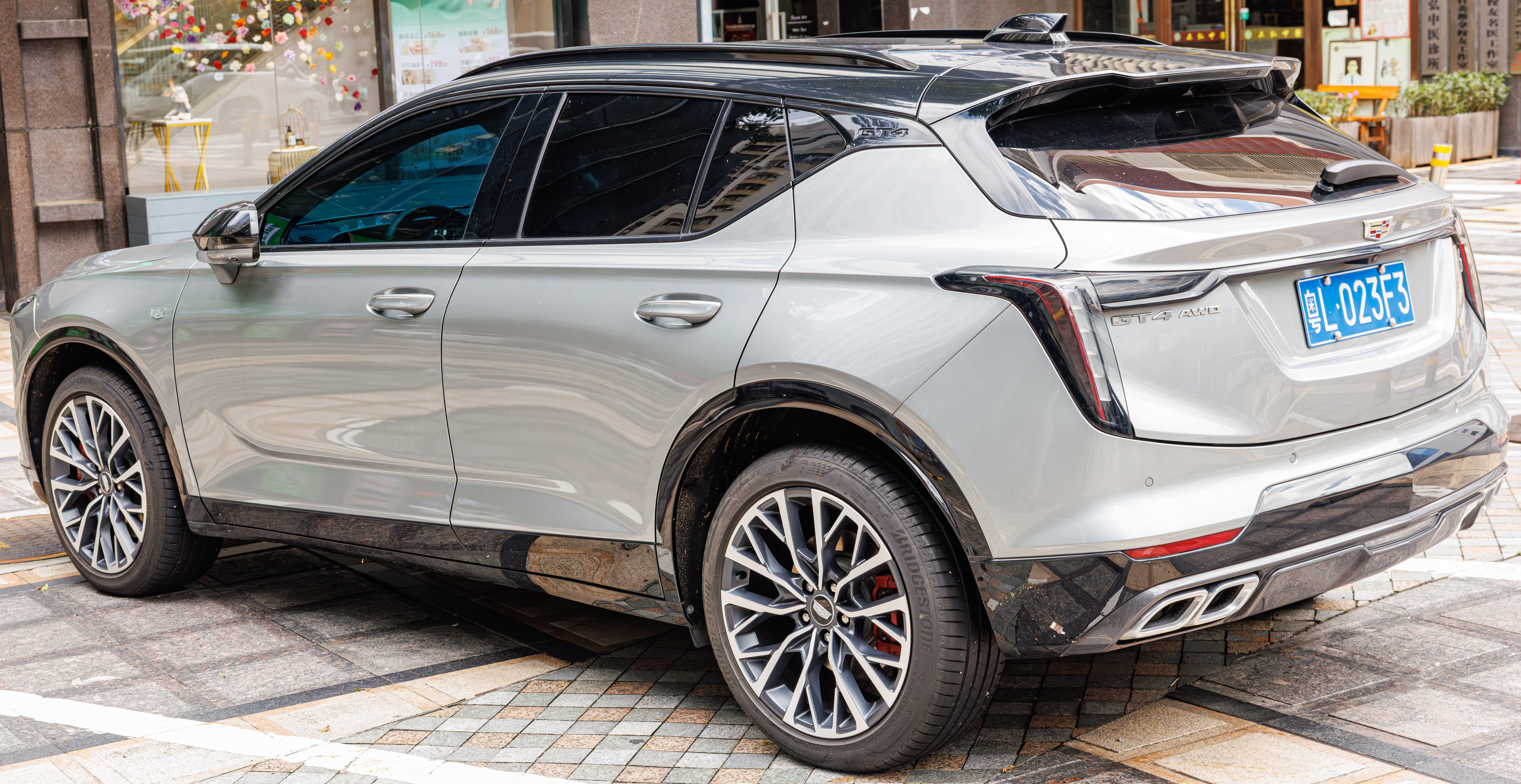
Rear view

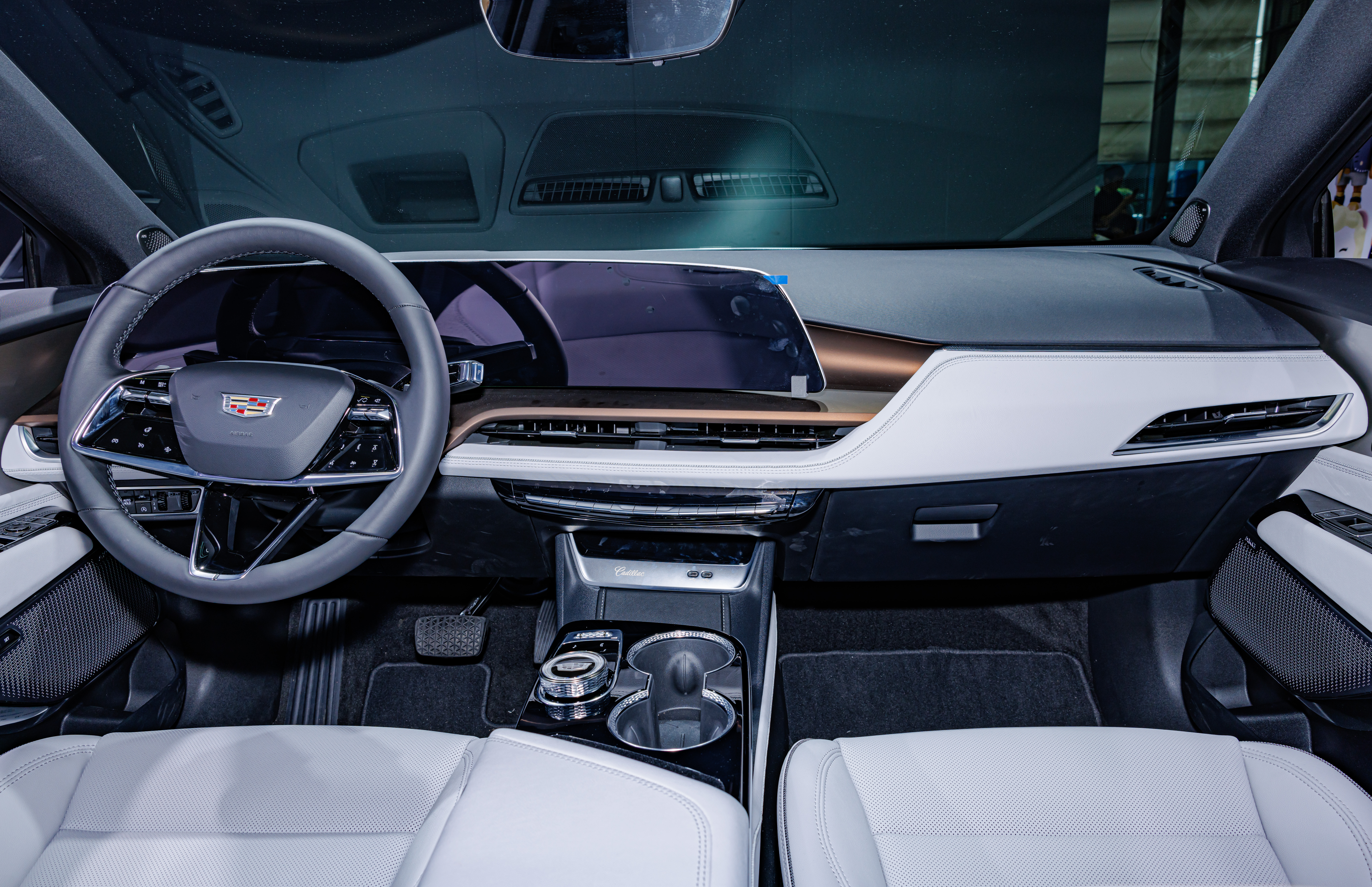
Interior

Engines
Type	Model	Engine type	Displacement	Power	Torque	Transmission	Top speed	0–100 km/h (62 mph)	Layout	Cal. years
Petrol mild hybrid	25T	N/A	1,498 cc (1.5 L) I4 turbo	211 hp (157 kW; 214 PS) @5,500	270 N⋅m (27.5 kg⋅m; 199 lb⋅ft) @1,750-4,500	9-speed automatic	205 km/h (127 mph)	8.8 s	FWD	May 2023–
Petrol mild hybrid	28T	LSY	1,998 cc (2.0 L) I4 turbo	237 hp (177 kW; 240 PS) @5,000	350 N⋅m (35.7 kg⋅m; 258 lb⋅ft) @1,500-4,000	9-speed automatic	210 km/h (130 mph)	7.8 s	AWD	May 2023–

== Sales ==
Year	China
2023	3,610
2024	2,801
2025	2,698
