= GM Ecotec engine =

The GM Ecotec engine, also known by its codename L850, is a family of inline-four engines, displacing between 2.0 and 2.5 litres. Confusingly, the Ecotec name was also applied to both the Buick V6 Engine when used in Holden Vehicles, as well as the final DOHC derivatives of the previous GM Family II engine; the architecture was substantially re-engineered for this new Ecotec application produced since 2000. This engine family replaced the GM Family II engine, the GM 122 engine, the Saab H engine, and the Quad 4 engine. It is manufactured in multiple locations, to include Spring Hill Manufacturing, in Spring Hill, Tennessee, with engine blocks and cylinder heads cast at Saginaw Metal Casting Operations in Saginaw, Michigan.

== Generation I ==
Generation I

Overview
- Production: 1999–2012

Layout
- Displacement: 2.0 L (1,998 cc); 2.2 L (2,198 cc)
- Cylinder bore: 86 mm (3.4 in)
- Piston stroke: 86 mm (3.4 in); 94.6 mm (3.72 in)
- Compression ratio: 8.8:1; 9.5:1; 10.0:1

Combustion
- Fuel system: Sequential multi-point fuel injection; Gasoline direct injection
- Fuel type: Gasoline; CNG; E85

Dimensions
- Length: 665 mm (26.2 in)
- Width: 642 mm (25.3 in)
- Height: 655 mm (25.8 in)
- Dry weight: 139–150 kg (306–331 lb)

The "Ecotec" name was adopted in 1994 for the new generation of Family II engines (2000 in North America) . The name was already used for the Opel GM Family II engine, Family 1 and Family 0 ranges. GM intended this new Ecotec to become its global 4-cylinder, and it has already fully replaced their OHV I4 line.

The Ecotec engine is a DOHC 4-valve design with a lost foam cast aluminium block and head (L850 for 86 mm bore applications, and L880 for 88 mm bore), designed for displacements from 1.8 to 2.4 L. Development began in 1994, by an international team of engineers and technicians from Opel's International Technical Development Center in Rüsselsheim, Germany, GM Powertrain in Pontiac, Michigan, and Saab in Södertälje, Sweden. Much of the development work on this project was carried out by Lotus Engineering, Hethel, United Kingdom. The engine uses aluminium pistons and cast iron cylinder liners. Vibration is reduced with twin balance shafts.

The first engine in the Ecotec Gen I line-up was Ecotec 2.2 L61, introduced in May 1999.

The current Ecotec line is manufactured in Tonawanda, New York.

=== 2.0 ===
==== LK9 ====
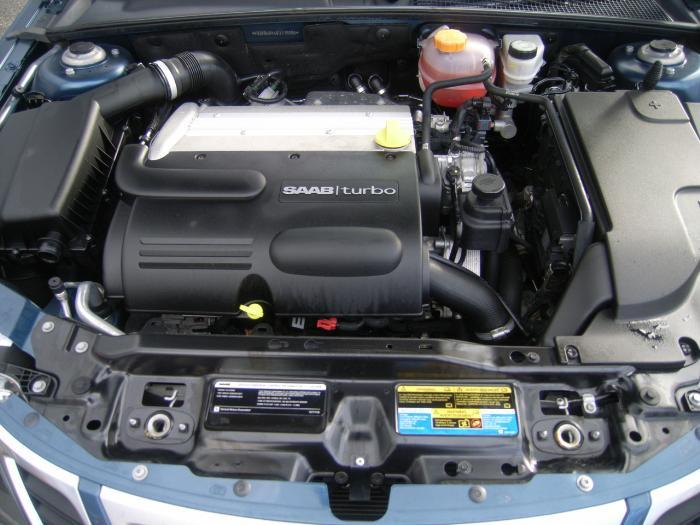
Saab B207 engine in a 2008 Saab 9-3 2.0T

This engine is also known as B207 when used by Saab and Z20NET by Opel for use in the Vectra C and Signum.

LK9 is a turbocharged 2.0 L (1,998 cc) version of the L850 (86 mm bore) series Ecotec utilizing an all-new reinforced sand cast aluminium cylinder head and upgraded internal components. The engine features a five-bearing forged steel crankshaft, strengthened connecting rods, redesigned pistons, piston oil cooling jets, reprofiled camshafts and an integrated oil cooler. The exhaust valves are liquid sodium-cooled. All vehicles using this engine feature Saab's Trionic 8 (T8) engine management system as well as a revised valve train. The timing chain and timing gears are also new, along with Saab's Direct Ignition system. The reinforcements, turbocharging, intercooling, internals, dual overhead camshaft, and such were developed by GM Powertrain Sweden (Saab Automobile Powertrain). It features an 86 mm (3.4 in) bore and stroke and a 9.5:1 compression ratio. Maximum power is 210 hp (157 kW) at 5300 rpm and 221 lb⋅ft (300 N⋅m) of torque at 2500 rpm. Maximum boost is 12.3 psi (0.85 bar).

Applications:

- 2003–2014 Saab 9-3 – B207E, B207L, B207R
- 2003–2008 Opel Vectra – Z20NET (rebadged B207L)
- 2003–2008 Opel Signum – Z20NET (rebadged B207L)
- 2006–2010 Cadillac BLS – B207L, B207R

Model	Years	Power	Torque	Turbocharger	Boost Pressure
1.8t (B207E)	2003–2006	148 hp (110 kW) @ 5500 rpm	177 lb⋅ft (240 N⋅m) @ 2000–3500 rpm	Low-pressure; (Garrett GT2052s)	7.3 psi (0.50 bar)
1.8t (B207E)	2006–2012	148 hp (110 kW) @ 5500 rpm	177 lb⋅ft (240 N⋅m) @ 2000–3500 rpm	Low-pressure; (MHI TD04-11TK)	7.3 psi (0.50 bar)
2.0t (B207L)	2003–2006	173 hp (129 kW) @ 5500 rpm	195 lb⋅ft (265 N⋅m) @ 2500–4000 rpm	Mid-pressure; (Garrett GT2052s)	8.7 psi (0.60 bar)
2.0t (B207L)	2006–2012	173 hp (129 kW) @ 5500 rpm	195 lb⋅ft (265 N⋅m) @ 2500–4000 rpm	Mid-pressure; (MHI TD04-11TK)	8.7 psi (0.60 bar)
2.0T (B207R)	2003–2014	207 hp (154.5 kW) @ 5300 rpm	221 lb⋅ft (300 N⋅m) @ 2500–4000 rpm	High-pressure; (MHI TD04-14T)	12.3 psi (0.85 bar)

==== LSJ ====
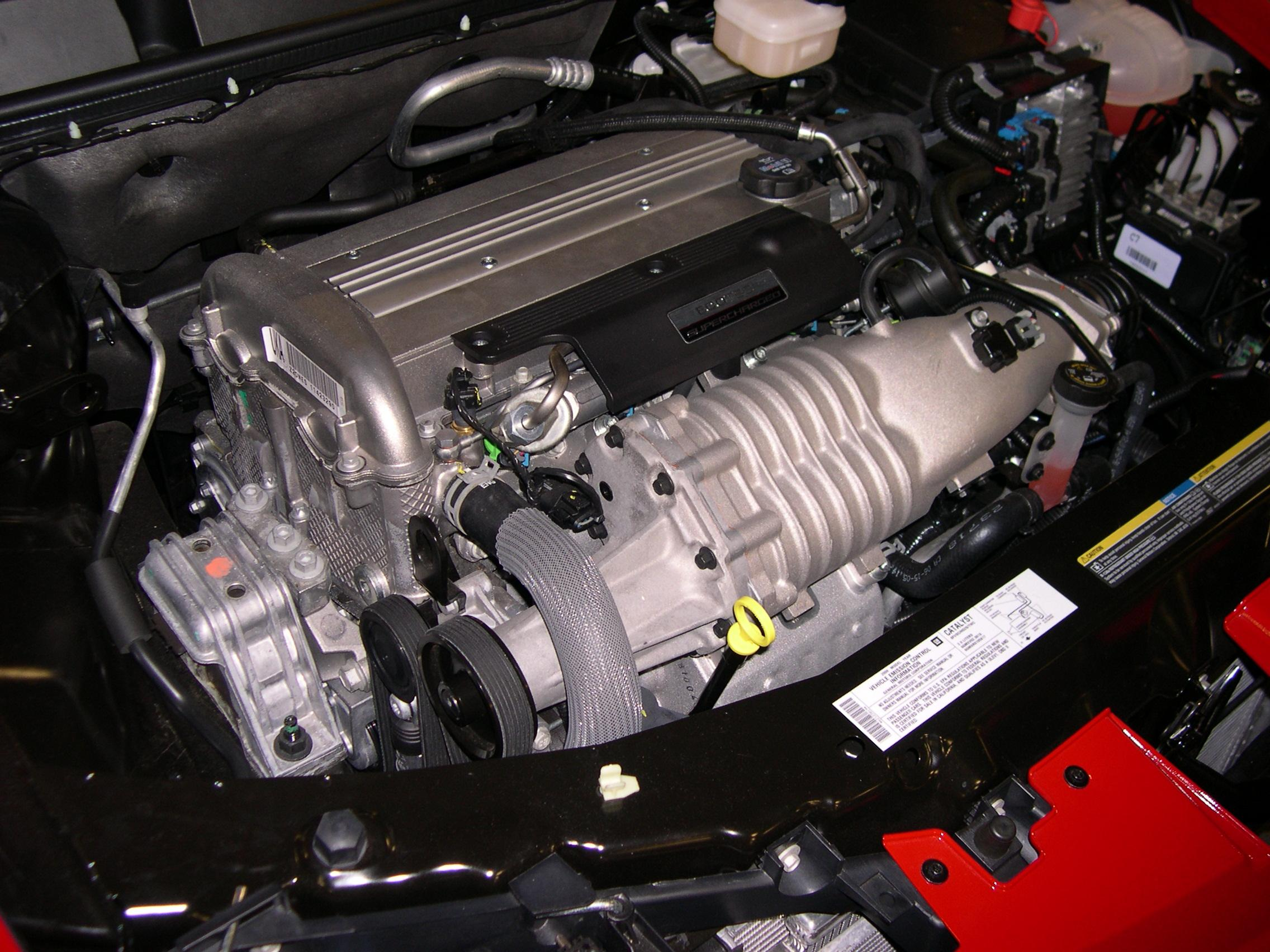
Ecotec LSJ engine in a 2006 Saturn Ion Red Line

The LSJ is a supercharged version of the LK9 Ecotec 2.0 L (1,998 cc) with an Eaton M62 Roots-type supercharger and air-to-liquid intercooler. The LSJ shares many of its components with the LK9 such as: piston cooling jets, oil cooler, pistons, connecting rods, crankshaft, oil pan, sodium-filled exhaust valves and cylinder head. It is rated at 205 hp (153 kW) at 5600 rpm and 200 lb⋅ft (271 N⋅m) at 4400 rpm with a compression ratio of 9.5:1 and a 6450 rpm redline. With the end of the Chevy Cobalt S/C SS and Saturn Ion Red Line, the LSJ was discontinued after 2007. In late 2005 Brammo Motorsports struck a deal with GM for the Supercharged 2.0 L Ecotec for their Ariel Atom. The engine came in various ratings from 205 hp (153 kW) to 300 hp (224 kW).

The LSJ was on the Ward's 10 Best Engines list for 2006.

This engine is used in:

Year(s)	Model	Power	Torque
2004–2007	Saturn Ion Red Line	205 hp (153 kW) @ 5600 rpm	200 lb⋅ft (271 N⋅m) @ 4400 rpm
2005–2007	Chevrolet Cobalt SS Supercharged Coupe	205 hp (153 kW) @ 5600 rpm	200 lb⋅ft (271 N⋅m) @ 4400 rpm

=== 2.2 ===
==== L61 ====
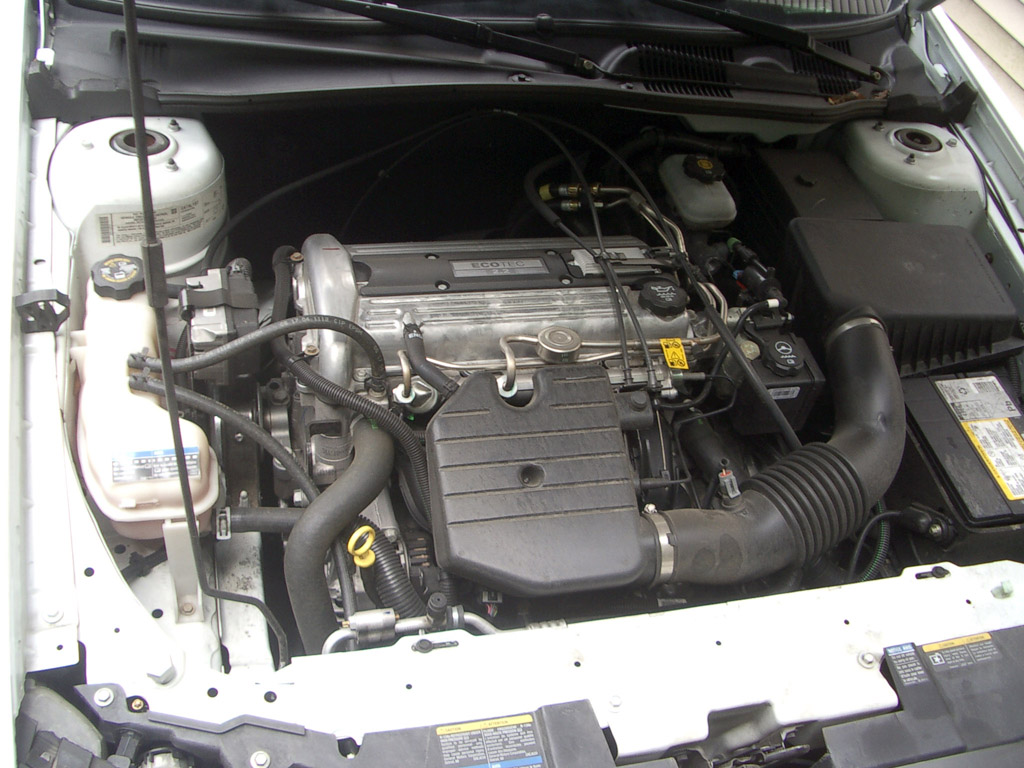
Ecotec L61 engine in a Chevrolet Classic (Malibu)

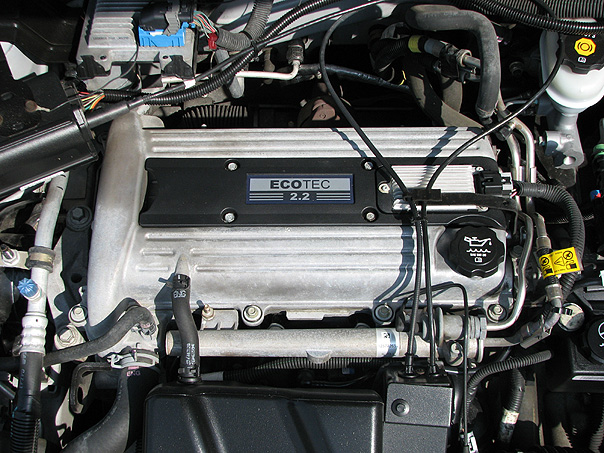
2003 Pontiac Sunfire Ecotec engine

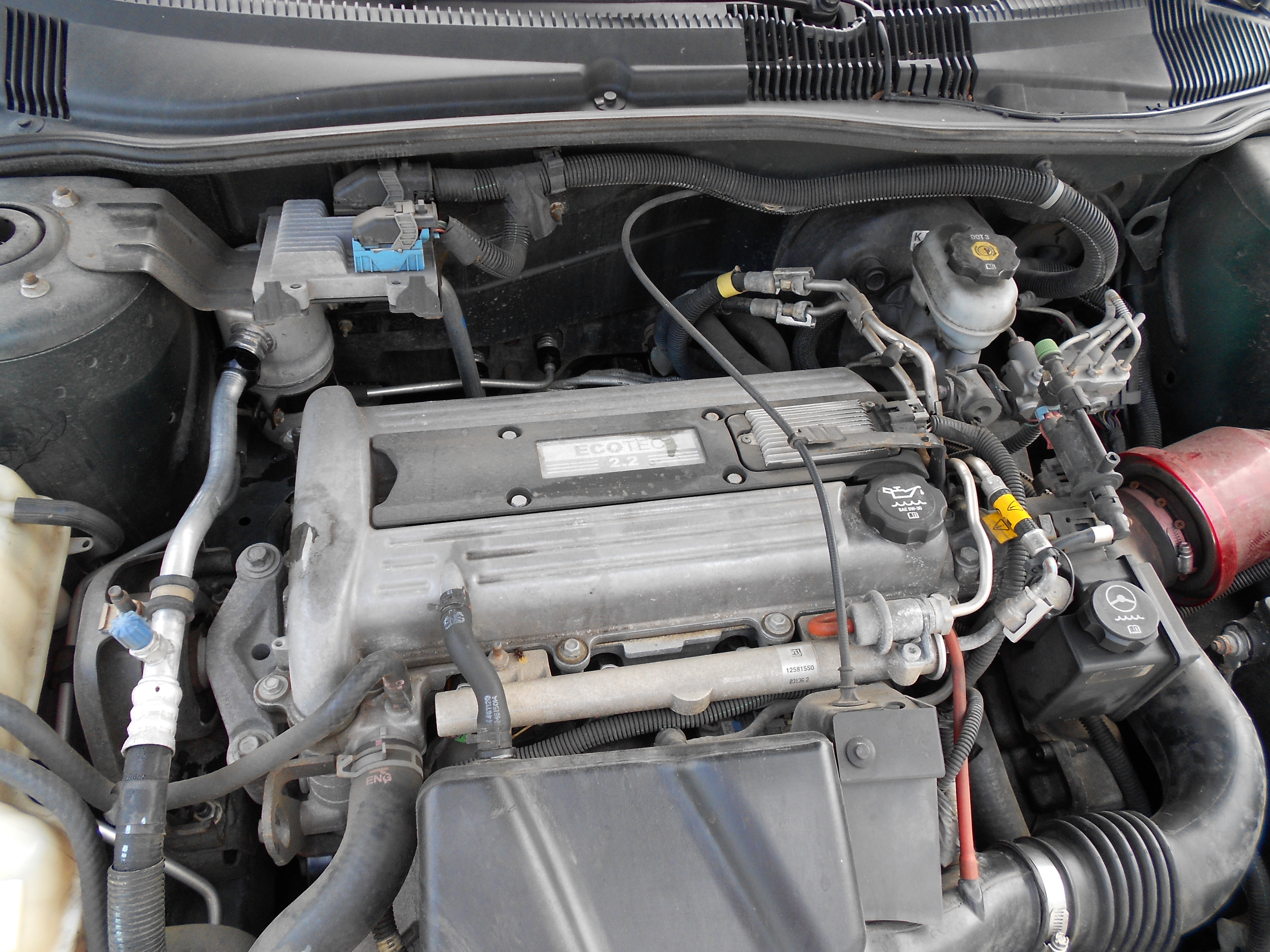
Ecotec L61 installed in a 2003 Chevrolet Cavalier

The basic Family II architecture was substantially re-engineered in 2000 to become the Ecotec Gen I. Unlike its notably harsh predecessor, the engine was designed for smoothness. Dual in-block balance shafts were integral to the design, the power-steering pump was mounted directly to the cylinder head and driven by the intake camshaft, the water-pump housing was cast into the block, and the A/C compressor and alternator were mounted directly on the block without brackets. The oil filter housing was cast into the block with a removable cover and replaceable paper element. It did not use an EGR valve. The Ecotec line is manufactured in Tonawanda, New York, and Kaiserslautern, Germany, and was also manufactured for Saturn in Spring Hill, Tennessee, until Saturn's discontinuation. In North America, this engine replaced both the Quad-4 and the GM 122 engines and first appeared in the 2000 Saturn L-Series.

The L61 is a 2.2 L (2,198 cc) version with a lost-foam cast aluminium cylinder head and block; it features an 86 mm (3.4 in) bore and 94.6 mm (3.72 in) stroke and either a 9.5:1 compression ratio or a 10.0:1. The engine is 665 mm (26.2 in) in length, 642 mm (25.3 in) in width, 655 mm (25.8 in) in height and approximately 139 kg (306 lb).

The Ecotec 2.2, model L61 first appeared in the 2000 Saturn LS1; the L61-powered Saturn Ion also replaced the Saturn-powered Saturn S-Series.

There are a few variations to the standard L61. The 2001-2003 Saturn L-Series got a more aggressive cam and retune that decreased horsepower slightly and added more low end torque. The 2004 Saturn L-Series has a higher output version with a higher (10.0:1) compression and the more aggressive camshaft. The 2004–2008 Chevrolet Malibu uses a version with electronic throttle control and a special unitized exhaust manifold and catalytic converter. The Malibu and Saturn versions also use return-less fuel injection. The 2002 Saturn VUE was the first North American variant of the L61 to be equipped with electronic throttle control, whereas other applications did not arise until 2005 in the Saturn ION and Chevrolet Cobalt. For 2007, introduced an updated version of the L61 based on the Gen II design.

The supercharger and inlet manifold from the 2.0 Ecotec LSJ engine can be purchased as an official kit from GM and along with modified software in the ECM, can create a 2.2 supercharged version of this engine.

The L61 was used in the following cars:

Year(s)	Model	Power	Torque	Compression ratio
2000	Saturn L-Series	137 hp (102 kW) @ 5800 rpm	135 lb⋅ft (183 N⋅m) @ 4400 rpm	9.5:1 |10.0:1
2001–2003	Saturn L-Series	135 hp (101 kW) @ 5200 rpm	142 lb⋅ft (193 N⋅m) @ 4400 rpm	9.5:1 |10.0:1
2004	Saturn L-Series	140 hp (104 kW) @ 5600 rpm	150 lb⋅ft (203 N⋅m) @ 4000 rpm	9.5:1 |10.0:1
2000–2003	Opel/Vauxhall Astra	147 hp (110 kW) @ 5800 rpm		
2000–2003	Opel/Vauxhall Zafira	147 hp (110 kW) @ 5800 rpm		
2001–2005	Opel Speedster/Vauxhall VX220	147 hp (110 kW) @ 5800 rpm		
2001–2002	Opel/Vauxhall Vectra	147 hp (110 kW) @ 5800 rpm		
2001–2006	Holden Astra (TS)	147 hp (110 kW) @ 5800 rpm		
2002–2005	Saturn Vue	143 hp (107 kW) @ 5400 rpm	152 lb⋅ft (206 N⋅m) @ 4000 rpm	10.0:1
2006	Saturn Vue	143 hp (107 kW) @ 5600 rpm	152 lb⋅ft (206 N⋅m) @ 4000 rpm	10.0:1
2007	Saturn Vue	144 hp (107 kW) @ 5600 rpm	152 lb⋅ft (206 N⋅m) @ 4000 rpm	10.0:1
2002	Chevrolet Cavalier, Pontiac Grand Am, Pontiac Sunfire	140 hp (104 kW) @ 5600 rpm	150 lb⋅ft (203 N⋅m) @ 4400 rpm	10.0:1
2003–2005	Chevrolet Cavalier, Pontiac Grand Am, Pontiac Sunfire	140 hp (104 kW) @ 5600 rpm	150 lb⋅ft (203 N⋅m) @ 4000 rpm	10.0:1
2002–2004	Oldsmobile Alero	140 hp (104 kW) @ 5600 rpm	150 lb⋅ft (203 N⋅m) @ 4000 rpm	10.0:1
2003–2006	Saturn Ion	140 hp (104 kW) @ 5800 rpm	145 lb⋅ft (197 N⋅m) @ 4400 rpm	10.0:1
2005–2006	Chevrolet Cobalt	145 hp (108 kW) @ 5600 rpm	155 lb⋅ft (210 N⋅m) @ 4000 rpm	10.0:1
2004	Chevrolet Malibu	145 hp (108 kW) @ 5600 rpm	155 lb⋅ft (210 N⋅m) @ 4000 rpm	10.0:1
2005–2006	Chevrolet Malibu	144 hp (107 kW) @ 5600 rpm	155 lb⋅ft (210 N⋅m) @ 4000 rpm	10.0:1
2005–2006	Pontiac Pursuit/G5	145 hp (108 kW) @ 5600 rpm	155 lb⋅ft (210 N⋅m) @ 4000 rpm	10.0:1
2006	Chevrolet HHR	143 hp (107 kW) @ 5600 rpm	150 lb⋅ft (203 N⋅m) @ 4000 rpm	

This engine also powered the Japanese-market Subaru Traviq, a badge-engineered Opel Zafira A.

Following the GM–Fiat agreement, the 2.2 L engine is also used in:

- Fiat Croma unmodified
- Alfa Romeo 159 heavy modified with Gasoline direct injection

==== Z22YH ====
A direct injection version of the 2.2 L (2,198 cc) Ecotec features 153 hp (114 kW) of power at 5600 rpm and 162 lb⋅ft (220 N⋅m) of torque at 3800 rpm with a compression ratio of 12.0:1, and has been available in:

- 2003 Opel/Vauxhall Vectra
- 2003 Opel/Vauxhall Signum
- 2005 Opel/Vauxhall Zafira
- 2006–2009 Holden Astra (Australia and New Zealand only)

==== L42 ====
The Ecotec 2.2, model L42 is a version of the Ecotec 2.2 designed to run on compressed natural gas (CNG). It delivers 129 hp (96 kW) and 129 lb⋅ft (175 N⋅m). It is used in the 2003–2004 Chevrolet Cavalier.

== Generation II ==
Generation II

Overview
- Production: 2006–present

Layout
- Displacement: 2.0 L (1,998 cc); 2.2 L (2,198 cc); 2.4 L (2,384 cc)
- Cylinder bore: 86 mm (3.4 in); 88 mm (3.5 in)
- Piston stroke: 86 mm (3.4 in); 94.6 mm (3.72 in); 98 mm (3.9 in)
- Compression ratio: 9.2:1; 10.0:1; 10.4:1; 11.2:1; 11.4:1

Combustion
- Fuel system: Sequential multi-point fuel injection; Gasoline direct injection
- Fuel type: Gasoline; E85

=== 2.0 LNF (Z20NHH Opel) ===
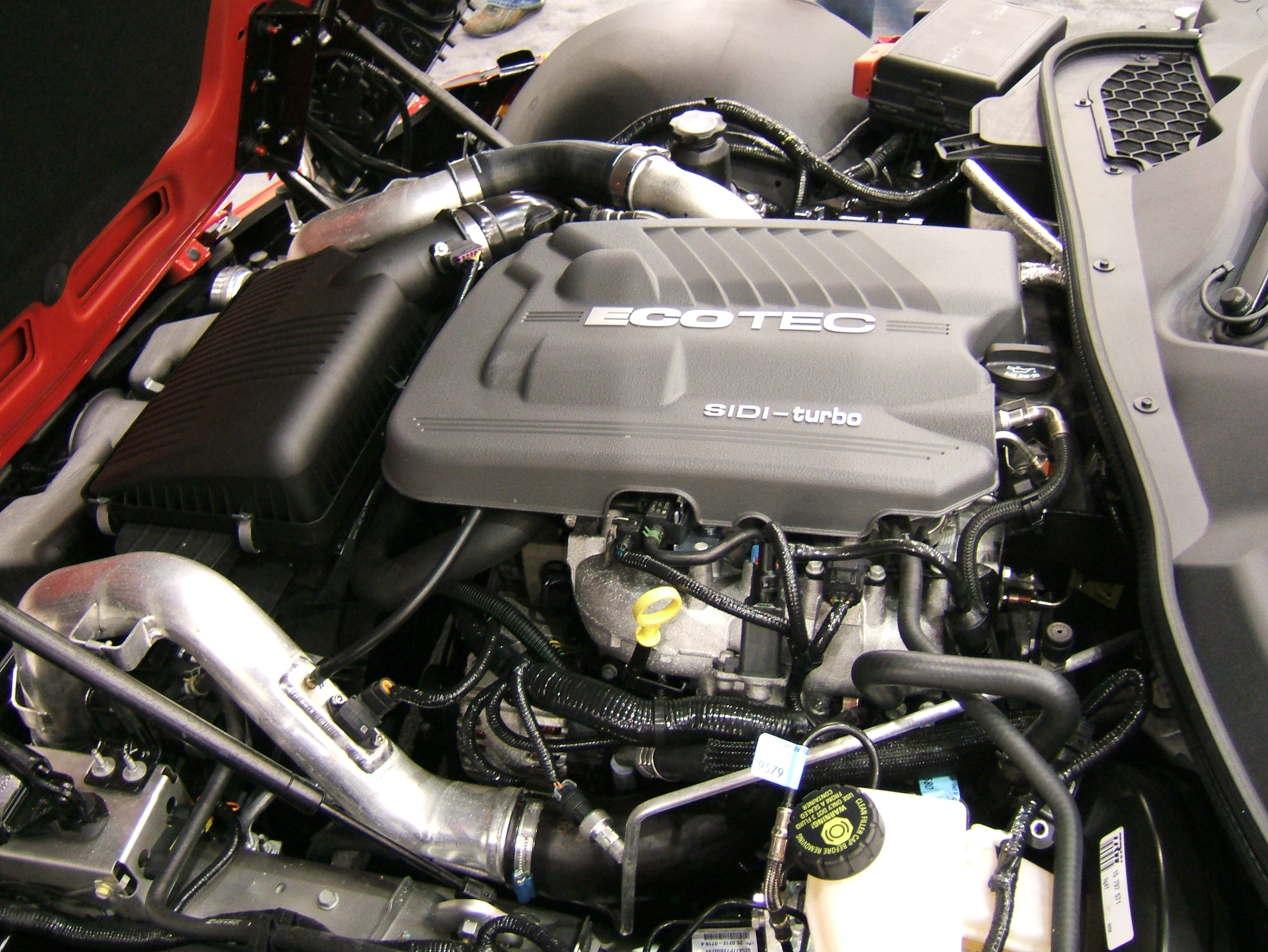
Ecotec LNF in a Pontiac Solstice

A turbocharged direct-injected (redubbed Spark Ignition Direct Injection) Ecotec was introduced in the 2007 Pontiac Solstice GXP and Saturn Sky Red Line. In these applications, the engine is mounted longitudinally. Displacement is 2.0 L (1,998 cc) with a square 86 mm (3.4 in) bore and stroke. Compression is 9.2:1 and maximum boost is 20 psi (1.4 bar), delivering 260 hp (194 kW) at 5300 rpm and 260 lb⋅ft (353 N⋅m) of torque from 2500 to 5250 rpm. Engine redline is at 6300 rpm and premium fuel is recommended.

The sodium filled exhaust valves were based on technology developed for the Corvette V8 powertrains. The sodium fuses and becomes a liquid at idle, which improves thermal conductivity and draws heat away from the valve face and valve guide towards the stem to be cooled by the engine oil circulating in this area. The camshaft-driven direct injection systems pressurizes the fuel to 450 psi (31 bar) at idle, and up to 2,250 psi (155 bar) at wide-open throttle. The "Gen II" block is similar to the 2.4 L and also features VVT technology. The Gen II block was developed using data from racing programs and computer simulations. The bore walls and bulkheads were strengthened with a weight increase of 2.5 lb (1.1 kg). The coolant jackets were expanded to improve heat transfer, resulting in a coolant capacity increase of 0.5 liters.

In December 2008, GM released a Turbo Upgrade Kit for the LNF engine which increases horsepower to 290 hp (216 kW) and torque to up to 340 lb⋅ft (461 N⋅m), depending on the model. The kit retailed for $650 and includes remapped engine calibration and upgraded 3 MAP sensors. The kit is covered by the cars' existing GM warranties. Boost pressure was increased from 18 to 21 pounds per square inch (1.24 to 1.45 bar).

Unique LNF features include:

- a twin-scroll turbocharger
- cam-driven high-pressure gasoline direct injection fuel system
- dual-camshaft continuously variable valve timing
- sodium-filled stainless steel Inconel exhaust valves
- low-friction cast aluminium pistons with oil squirters
- forged steel crankshaft
- forged steel connecting rods
- cast stainless steel exhaust manifold
- foam-cast Gen2 block
- Bosch injectors (0 261 500 055) or slightly larger (0 261 500 089) injectors in 2010 models

This engine is used in:

Year(s)	Model	Power	Torque
2007–2010	Opel GT	264 hp (197 kW) @ 5300 rpm	264 lb⋅ft (358 N⋅m) @ 2000 rpm
2007–2010	Pontiac Solstice GXP	260 hp (194 kW) @ 5300 rpm	260 lb⋅ft (353 N⋅m) @ 2000 rpm
2007–2010	Saturn Sky Red Line	260 hp (194 kW) @ 5300 rpm	260 lb⋅ft (353 N⋅m) @ 2000 rpm
2008–2010	Chevrolet HHR SS	260 hp (194 kW) @ 5300 rpm	260 lb⋅ft (353 N⋅m) @ 2000 rpm
2008–2010	Chevrolet Cobalt SS	260 hp (194 kW) @ 5300 rpm	260 lb⋅ft (353 N⋅m) @ 2000 rpm
2012	Fisker Karma	260 hp (194 kW) @ 5300 rpm	260 lb⋅ft (353 N⋅m) @ 2000 rpm
2009	Elfin T5	264 hp (197 kW) @ 5300 rpm	259 lb⋅ft (351 N⋅m) @ 2000 rpm

=== 2.0 LDK (A20NHT Opel) ===
An updated variant of the LNF (also with 9.2:1 compression ratio) was released in 2008, meeting the Euro 5 emission standard. This engine is also known as A20NHT by GM Powertrain Europe.

Unique LDK features include:

- a twin-scroll turbocharger
- cam-driven high-pressure gasoline direct injection fuel system
- dual camshaft continuously variable valve timing
- sodium-filled stainless steel Inconel exhaust valves
- low-friction cast aluminium pistons with oil squirters
- forged steel crankshaft
- cast stainless steel exhaust manifold
- foam-cast Gen2 block
- Bosch injectors (0 261 500 055)

This engine is used in:

Year(s)	Model	Power	Torque
2008–2013	Opel Insignia / Vauxhall Insignia	220 hp (162 kW) @ 5300 rpm	258 lb⋅ft (350 N⋅m) @ 2500 rpm
2009–2010	Buick Regal Turbo	220 hp (162 kW) @ 5300 rpm	258 lb⋅ft (350 N⋅m) @ 2500 rpm
2010–2013	Buick Regal GS (China Market)	220 hp (162 kW) @ 5300 rpm	258 lb⋅ft (350 N⋅m) @ 2500 rpm
2010–2012	Saab 9-5	220 hp (162 kW) @ 5300 rpm	258 lb⋅ft (350 N⋅m) @ 2500 rpm
2009–2010	Buick Regal Turbo (Hirsch Performance)	261 hp (192 kW) @ 5400 rpm	295 lb⋅ft (400 N⋅m) @ 3000–4000 rpm
2010–2013	Buick Regal GS (Hirsch Performance)	261 hp (192 kW) @ 5400 rpm	295 lb⋅ft (400 N⋅m) @ 3000–4000 rpm
2011–2013	Cadillac SLS (China)	262 hp (193 kW) @ 5300 rpm	266 lb⋅ft (360 N⋅m) @ 2000–5000 rpm
2014–2017	Buick Regal GS (China Market)	254 hp (187 kW) @ 5300 rpm	258 lb⋅ft (350 N⋅m) @ 2000–5000 rpm

=== LHU (A20NFT Opel) ===
LHU adds E85 flex-fuel capability to the LDK. This engine is also known as A20NFT by GM Powertrain Europe. Maximum engine speed is listed at 6350 rpm.

Unique LHU features include:

- a twin-scroll turbocharger
- cam-driven high-pressure gasoline direct injection fuel system
- dual camshaft continuously variable valve timing
- sodium-filled stainless steel Inconel exhaust valves
- low-friction cast aluminium pistons with oil squirters
- forged steel crankshafts
- cast stainless steel exhaust manifold
- sand-cast Gen3 block
- Larger Bosch injectors (0 261 500 112) with ethanol-safe seals for flex-fuel compatibility

Year(s)	Model	Power	Torque	Notes
2011–2013	Buick Regal Turbo	220 hp (164 kW) @ 5300 rpm	258 lb⋅ft (350 N⋅m) @ 2000 rpm	
2011–2012	Saab 9-5 Turbo4	220 hp (164 kW) @ 5300 rpm	258 lb⋅ft (350 N⋅m) @ 2000 rpm	
2014	Saab 9-3 Turbo4 (NEVS)	220 hp (164 kW) @ 5300 rpm	258 lb⋅ft (350 N⋅m) @ 2000 rpm	451 built
2011–2013	Buick Regal GS	270 hp (201 kW)	295 lb⋅ft (400 N⋅m) @ 2400 rpm	
2011–2013	Opel Insignia / Vauxhall Insignia 4×4	250 hp (184 kW) @ 5300 rpm	295 lb⋅ft (400 N⋅m) @ 2400–3600 rpm	
2012–2017	Opel Astra J OPC / Vauxhall Astra J VXR	280 hp (206 kW) @ 5500 rpm	295 lb⋅ft (400 N⋅m) @ 2500–4500 rpm	
2013–2016	Buick Verano Turbo	250 hp (186 kW) @ 5300 rpm	260 lb⋅ft (353 N⋅m) @ 2000 rpm	
2014–2017	Buick Regal GS (Hirsch Performance)	279 hp (205 kW) @ 5400 rpm	302 lb⋅ft (410 N⋅m) @ 3000–4000 rpm	
2017–2019	Opel Astra K TCR	349 hp (257 kW) @ 6300 rpm	310 lb⋅ft (420 N⋅m) @ 2500–4600 rpm	

Note: The A20NFT engine in Opel Astra K TCR is a racing engine and swapped the original direct fuel injection for multi-point fuel injection.

=== 2.2 ===
==== L61 ====
In 2007, the L61 received a multitude of changes, that originated from the LE5. It switched to the higher-strength Gen II block and received a revised cylinder head (enlarged exhaust ports) and camshaft design (increased exhaust valve duration). The engine also switched from wasted spark ignition to individual coil-on-plug ignition; this forced the cam cover to be redesigned. It was also switched to an E37 engine controller with new crank and cam sensors (replacing timing sensor previously found in ignition cassette). These changes increase horsepower slightly and allow the engine to meet PZEV standards. Compression ratio is 10.0:1.

The L61 was used in the following cars:

Year(s)	Model	Power	Torque
2007	Chevrolet HHR	149 hp (111 kW) @ 5600 rpm	152 lb⋅ft (206 N⋅m) @ 4000 rpm
2008	Chevrolet HHR	149 hp (111 kW) @ 5600 rpm	152 lb⋅ft (206 N⋅m) @ 4200 rpm
2007–2008	Chevrolet Cobalt	148 hp (110 kW) @ 5600 rpm	152 lb⋅ft (206 N⋅m) @ 4200 rpm
2007–2008	Pontiac Pursuit/G5	148 hp (110 kW) @ 5600 rpm	152 lb⋅ft (206 N⋅m) @ 4200 rpm
2007–2008	Chevrolet Malibu	145 hp (108 kW) @ 5600 rpm	152 lb⋅ft (206 N⋅m) @ 4200 rpm
2007	Saturn Ion	145 hp (108 kW) @ 5600 rpm	150 lb⋅ft (203 N⋅m) @ 4200 rpm

==== LAP ====
The LAP is a 2.2 L (2,198 cc) version of the Ecotec, based on the Gen II block with cylinder head improvements, new camshaft design, E37 engine control module, 58X crankshaft reluctor ring, dual variable valve timing, digital crank and cam sensors, individual coil-on-plug ignition, vented starter solenoid, new MAP sensor, new intake manifold seals, new oil filter element, a 32-bit computer, and improved emissions performance.

Bore and stroke are 86 mm (3.4 in) and 94.6 mm (3.72 in), the same as the 2.2 L L61. Compression ratio is 10.0:1. Major features that set it apart from the 2.2 L L61 are variable-valve-timing and other cylinder head improvements from the 2.4 L LE5.

Year(s)	Model	Power	Torque
2009–2010	Chevrolet Cobalt	155 hp (116 kW) @ 6100 rpm	150 lb⋅ft (203 N⋅m) @ 4900 rpm
2009	Pontiac G5	155 hp (116 kW) @ 6100 rpm	150 lb⋅ft (203 N⋅m) @ 4900 rpm

==== LE8 ====
The LE8 is an E85-compatible 2.2 L (2,198 cc) version of the LAP Ecotec. Bore and stroke remain the same 86 mm (3.4 in) and 94.6 mm (3.72 in). Compression ratio is 10.0:1 and the engine can run on both regular unleaded gasoline or E85.

Year(s)	Model	Power	Torque
2009–2011	Chevrolet HHR	155 hp (116 kW) @ 6100 rpm (gasoline)	150 lb⋅ft (203 N⋅m) @ 4800 rpm (gasoline)
2009–2011	Chevrolet HHR	160 hp (119 kW) @ 6000 rpm (E85)	158 lb⋅ft (214 N⋅m) @ 4600 rpm (E85)

=== 2.4 ===
==== LE5 ====
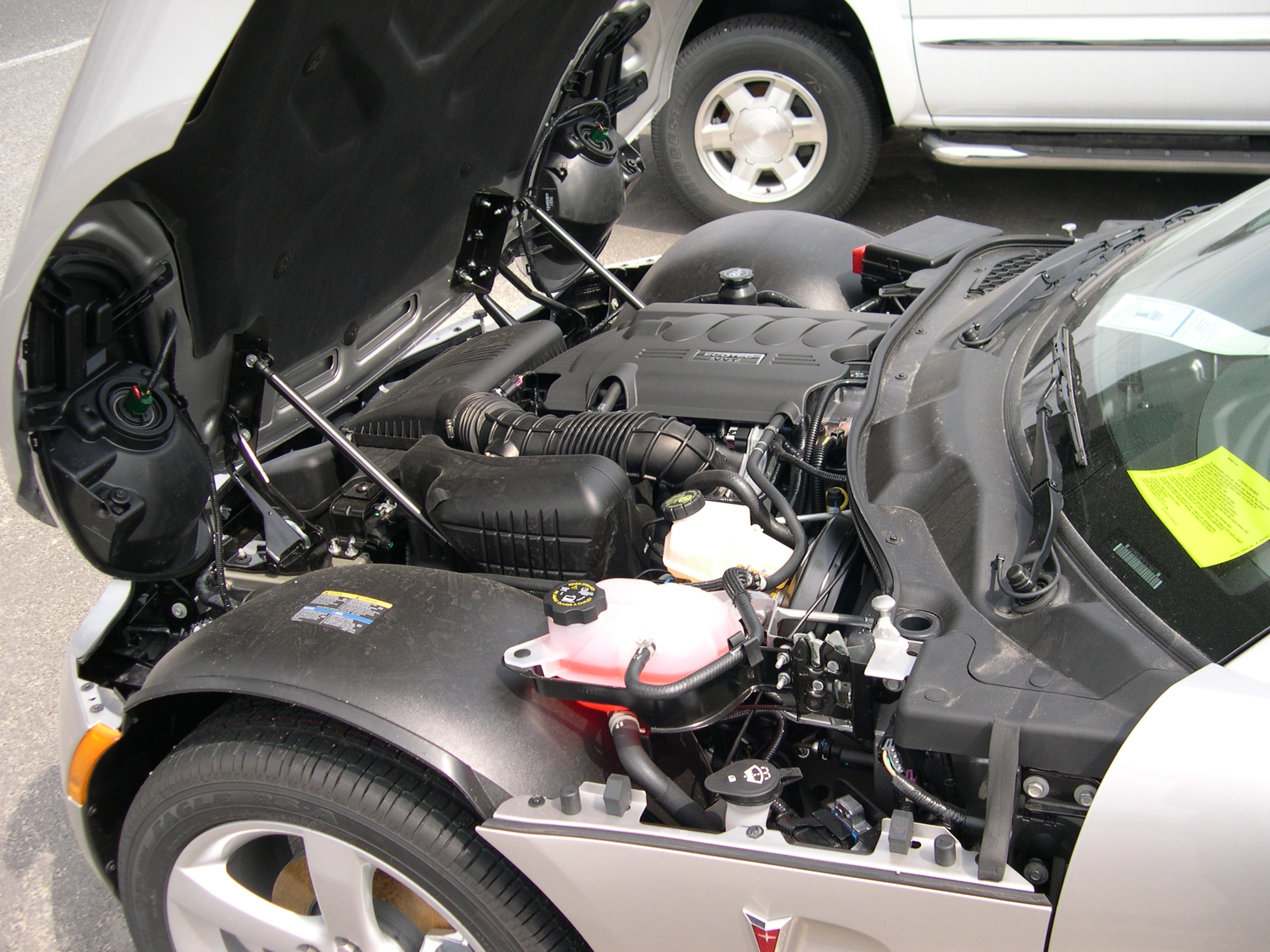
Ecotec LE5 engine in a 2006 Pontiac Solstice

The LE5 is a larger 2.4 L (2,384 cc) version of the Ecotec. Both the 88 mm (3.5 in) bore and 98 mm (3.9 in) stroke are larger, and Variable Valve Timing on the intake and exhaust improve low-end torque. Compression is 10.4:1. Power is 164–177 hp (123–132 kW) and torque is 159–170 lb·ft (215–230 N·m). The engine uses a reinforced "Gen II" block. Connecting rods are GKN-forged; C70 powdered metal was used from July 2007 on.

Year(s)	Model	Power	Torque
2006–2008	Buick Lacrosse (China)	168 hp (125 kW) @ 6400 rpm	166 lb⋅ft (225 N⋅m) @ 4800 rpm
2006–2007	Chevrolet Cobalt SS	173 hp (129 kW) @ 6200 rpm	163 lb⋅ft (221 N⋅m) @ 4800 rpm
2008	Chevrolet Cobalt Sport	171 hp (128 kW) @ 6200 rpm	167 lb⋅ft (226 N⋅m) @ 4800 rpm
2006–2008	Chevrolet HHR	175 hp (130 kW)	165 lb⋅ft (224 N⋅m)
2006–2008	Pontiac G5/Pursuit	171 hp (128 kW) @ 5800 rpm	167 lb⋅ft (226 N⋅m) @ 4500 rpm
2006–2009	Pontiac G6	169 hp (126 kW) @ 6300 rpm	162 lb⋅ft (220 N⋅m) @ 4500 rpm
2006–2009	Pontiac Solstice	173 hp (129 kW) @ 5800 rpm	164 lb⋅ft (222 N⋅m) @ 4500 rpm
2006–2009	Saturn Sky	177 hp (132 kW) @ 5800 rpm	173 lb⋅ft (235 N⋅m) @ 4800 rpm
2006	Saturn Ion	170 hp (127 kW) @ 6200 rpm	162 lb⋅ft (220 N⋅m) @ 4800 rpm
2007	Saturn Ion	175 hp (130 kW) @ 6500 rpm	164 lb⋅ft (222 N⋅m) @ 4800 rpm
2008–2009	Saturn Aura	169 hp (126 kW)	160 lb⋅ft (217 N⋅m)
2008–2012	Chevrolet Malibu	169 hp (126 kW)	160 lb⋅ft (217 N⋅m)
2008–2009	Saturn Vue	169 hp (126 kW) @ 6200 rpm	161 lb⋅ft (218 N⋅m) @ 5100 rpm

The LE5 is also used in the following overseas models:

- 2006 GM Taiwan Buick LaCrosse
- 2006 Shanghai GM Buick LaCrosse
- Buick GL8

The LE5 or a close variant is also used in the Polaris Slingshot (announced July 27, 2014), coupled with a 5-speed manual transmission and a final belt drive. The Slingshot is a three-wheeled side-by-side street vehicle, classed as a motorcycle.

==== LAT ====
The LAT is the designation used for the 2.4 L LE5 when used in GM's BAS mild-hybrid vehicles.

Year(s)	Model	Power	Torque
2007–2009	Saturn Aura Green Line Hybrid	164 hp (122 kW) @ 6400 rpm	159 lb⋅ft (216 N⋅m) @ 5000 rpm
2008–2009	Chevrolet Malibu Hybrid	164 hp (122 kW) @ 6400 rpm	159 lb⋅ft (216 N⋅m) @ 5000 rpm
2008–2009	Buick LaCrosse hybrid (China only)	164 hp (122 kW) @ 6400 rpm	166 lb⋅ft (225 N⋅m) @ 4800 rpm
2007	Saturn Vue Green Line Hybrid	170 hp (127 kW) @ 6600 rpm	162 lb⋅ft (220 N⋅m) @ 4200 rpm
2008	Saturn Vue Green Line Hybrid	172 hp (128 kW) @ 6500 rpm	167 lb⋅ft (226 N⋅m) @ 4500 rpm

==== LE9 ====
The LE9 is an E85-compatible version of the 2.4 L (2,384 cc) LE5 Ecotec. Bore and stroke are 88 mm (3.5 in) and 98 mm (3.9 in) and has a compression ratio of 10.4:1, the same as the LE5.

Year(s)	Model	Power	Torque
2009–2011	Chevrolet HHR	172 hp (128 kW) @ 5800 rpm (gasoline)	167 lb⋅ft (226 N⋅m) @ 4500 rpm (gasoline)
2009–2011	Chevrolet HHR	176 hp (131 kW) @ 5800 rpm (E85)	170 lb⋅ft (230 N⋅m) @ 5000 rpm (E85)
2010–2012	Chevrolet Malibu (fleet only)	175 hp (130 kW) @ 5800 rpm (E85)	170 lb⋅ft (230 N⋅m) @ 5000 rpm (E85)
2014–2019	Polaris Slingshot	173 hp (129 kW) @ 6200 rpm	166 lb⋅ft (225 N⋅m) @ 4700 rpm

==== LAF ====
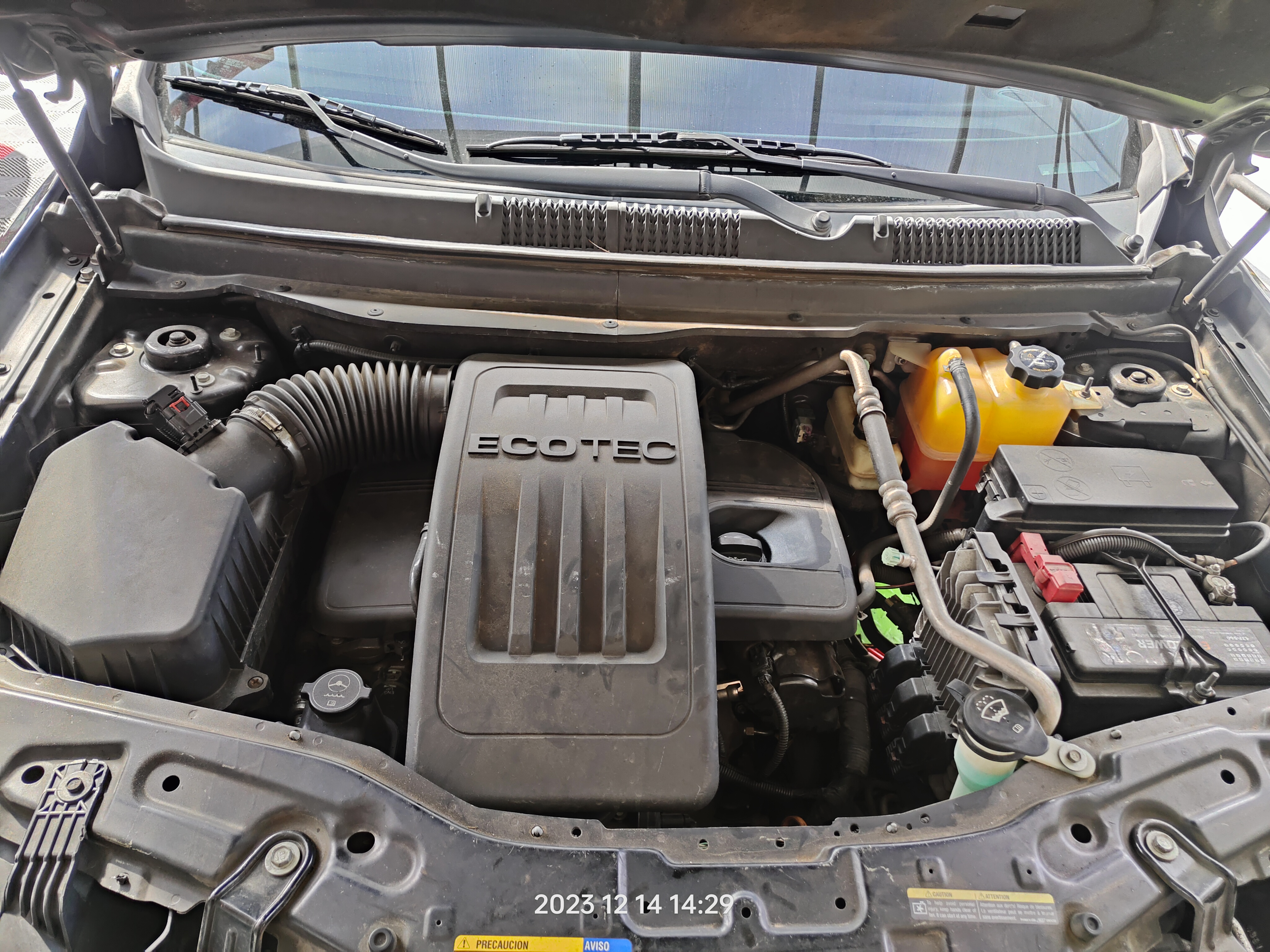
GM Ecotec 2.4

The LAF is a direct injected 2.4 L. It uses technology based on GM's other four-cylinder direct-injection applications, but with unique features designed for its specific application. This includes an 11.2:1 compression ratio that helps build power, slightly dished pistons that increase combustion efficiency and injectors with an application-specific flow rate.

Year(s)	Model	Power	Torque
2010–2011	Chevrolet Equinox; GMC Terrain	182 hp (136 kW) @ 6700 rpm (gasoline)	172 lb⋅ft (233 N⋅m) @ 4900 rpm (gasoline)
2010–2011	Buick LaCrosse	182 hp (136 kW) @ 6700 rpm (gasoline)	172 lb⋅ft (233 N⋅m) @ 4900 rpm (gasoline)
2011	Buick Regal	182 hp (136 kW) @ 6700 rpm (gasoline)	172 lb⋅ft (233 N⋅m) @ 4900 rpm (gasoline)
2011	Chevrolet Captiva	182 hp (136 kW) @ 6700 rpm (gasoline)	172 lb⋅ft (233 N⋅m) @ 4900 rpm (gasoline)
2011–2014	Chevrolet Orlando	174 hp (130 kW) @ 6700 rpm	171 lb⋅ft (232 N⋅m) @ 4900 rpm

==== LEA ====
The LEA is an E85 compatible variant of the LAF. Bore, stroke, and compression ratio all remain the same. Maximum engine speed is listed at 7000 rpm.

Year(s)	Model	Power	Torque
2012–2013, 2015–2017	Buick Regal	182 hp (136 kW) @ 6700 rpm	172 lb⋅ft (233 N⋅m) @ 4900 rpm
2012–2017	Chevrolet Captiva Sport	182 hp (136 kW) @ 6700 rpm	172 lb⋅ft (233 N⋅m) @ 4900 rpm
2012–2017	Chevrolet Equinox; GMC Terrain	182 hp (136 kW) @ 6700 rpm	172 lb⋅ft (233 N⋅m) @ 4900 rpm
2012–2017	Buick Verano	180 hp (134 kW) @ 6700 rpm	171 lb⋅ft (232 N⋅m) @ 4900 rpm
2012–2017	Chevrolet Orlando	174 hp (130 kW) @ 6700 rpm	171 lb⋅ft (232 N⋅m) @ 4900 rpm
2013–2016	Chevrolet Malibu	170 hp (127 kW) @ 5800 rpm	170 lb⋅ft (230 N⋅m) @ 4600 rpm

==== LUK ====
The LUK is similar to the LAF, but adds the eAssist mild-hybrid system. Maximum engine speed is listed at 7000 rpm.

Year(s)	Model	Power	Torque
2012–2016	Buick LaCrosse	182 hp (136 kW) @ 6700 rpm	172 lb⋅ft (233 N⋅m) @ 4900 rpm
2012–2017	Buick Regal	182 hp (136 kW) @ 6700 rpm	172 lb⋅ft (233 N⋅m) @ 4900 rpm
2013–2014	Chevrolet Malibu ECO	182 hp (136 kW) @ 6700 rpm	172 lb⋅ft (233 N⋅m) @ 4900 rpm
2014	Chevrolet Impala	182 hp (136 kW) @ 6700 rpm	172 lb⋅ft (233 N⋅m) @ 4900 rpm

== Generation III ==
Generation III

Overview
- Production: 2013–present

Layout
- Displacement: 2.0 L (1,998 cc); 2.5 L (2,457 cc)
- Cylinder bore: 86 mm (3.4 in); 88 mm (3.5 in)
- Piston stroke: 86 mm (3.4 in); 100.8 mm (3.97 in)
- Compression ratio: 9.5:1; 11.3:1

Combustion
- Fuel system: Spark Ignition Direct Injection (SIDI)
- Fuel type: Gasoline

=== 2.0 ===
==== LTG ====
A 2.0 L (1,998 cc) turbocharged direct-injection version of the Gen III Ecotec was available in the 2013 Cadillac ATS and Chevrolet Malibu, and also in the Cadillac XTS and Cadillac XT5 for the Chinese market. Engine development was led by GMTCK Managing Director J.H. Hwang and a team from GM Korea (GMTCK). Bore and stroke are both 86.0 mm (3.39 in), and compression is 9.5:1. The engine uses a twin-scroll turbocharger with electronically controlled wastegate/bypass valve, air-to-air intercooler, stainless-steel dual-scroll (1–4, 2–3) exhaust manifold designed to withstand 980 °C (1,800 °F) turbine temperature, and a rotacast aluminium-alloy (A356T6) cylinder head with sodium-filled exhaust valves. Maximum engine speed is listed at 7000 rpm.

Year(s)	Model	Power	Torque
2013–2014	Cadillac ATS	272 hp (203 kW) @ 5500 rpm	260 lb⋅ft (353 N⋅m) @ 1700–5500 rpm
2015–2019	Cadillac ATS	272 hp (203 kW) @ 5500 rpm	295 lb⋅ft (400 N⋅m) @ 3000–4600 rpm
2014–2016	Cadillac ATS 25T (China)	230 hp (172 kW) @ 5500 rpm	260 lb⋅ft (353 N⋅m) @ 2000–4000 rpm
2014–2019	Cadillac ATS 28T (China)	279 hp (208 kW) @ 5500 rpm	295 lb⋅ft (400 N⋅m) @ 2900–4600 rpm
2013	Chevrolet Malibu	259 hp (193 kW) @ 5300 rpm	260 lb⋅ft (353 N⋅m) @ 1700–5500 rpm
2014–2015	Chevrolet Malibu	259 hp (193 kW) @ 5300 rpm	295 lb⋅ft (400 N⋅m) @ 5200 rpm
2016–2022	Chevrolet Malibu	250 hp (186 kW) @ 5300 rpm	260 lb⋅ft (353 N⋅m) @ 2000–5000 rpm
2013–2017	Opel Insignia A	247 hp (184 kW) @ 4500 rpm	295 lb⋅ft (400 N⋅m) @ 2000–4500 rpm
2017–2018	Opel Insignia B (GSi)	256 hp (191 kW) @ 5300 rpm	295 lb⋅ft (400 N⋅m) @ 2500–4000 rpm
2014–2017	Buick Regal	259 hp (193 kW) @ 5300 rpm	295 lb⋅ft (400 N⋅m) @ 3000–4000 rpm; (2500–4000 rpm for GS)
2018–2020	Buick Regal	250 hp (186 kW) @ 5400 rpm	260 lb⋅ft (353 N⋅m) @ 2000–5200 rpm; 295 lb⋅ft (400 N⋅m) @ 3000–4000 rpm for AWD
2014&2019	Cadillac CTS	268 hp (200 kW) @ 5600 rpm	295 lb⋅ft (400 N⋅m) @ 3000–4500 rpm
2016–2018	Buick Envision	252 hp (188 kW) @ 5500 rpm	260 lb⋅ft (353 N⋅m) @ 2000 rpm
2019–2020	Buick Envision	252 hp (188 kW) @ 5500 rpm	295 lb⋅ft (400 N⋅m) @ 2000 rpm
2016–2018	Cadillac CT6	265 hp (198 kW) @ 5500 rpm	295 lb⋅ft (400 N⋅m) @ 3000–4000 rpm
2016–2024	Chevrolet Camaro	275 hp (205 kW) @ 5600 rpm	295 lb⋅ft (400 N⋅m) @ 3000–4500 rpm
2017–2019	Buick GL8	260 hp (194 kW) @ 5500 rpm	258 lb⋅ft (350 N⋅m) @ 2000-5000 rpm
2018–2020	Chevrolet Equinox	252 hp (188 kW) @ 5500 rpm	260 lb⋅ft (353 N⋅m) @ 2500–4500 rpm
2018–2020	GMC Terrain	252 hp (188 kW) @ 5500 rpm	260 lb⋅ft (353 N⋅m) @ 2500–4500 rpm
2018–2019	Chevrolet Traverse RS	257 hp (192 kW) @ 5500 rpm	295 lb⋅ft (400 N⋅m) @ 3000 rpm
2018–2020	Holden Commodore	256 hp (191 kW) @ 5500 rpm	258 lb⋅ft (350 N⋅m) @ 3000–4000 rpm

==== LSY ====
A successor to the LTG debuted in the 2019 Cadillac XT4 and the 2019 Cadillac CT6. The LSY adds Active Fuel Management and a start-stop system, putting more priority to fuel economy than performance. Peak output is lower than the LTG, but is achieved at lower rpm for both power and torque. Bore is 83.0 mm (3.27 in) and stroke is 92.3 mm (3.63 in). This engine is used in some GM vehicles in the U.S and as the standard engine option in China.

Year(s)	Model	Power	Torque
2019	Cadillac CT6	237 hp (177 kW) @ 5000 rpm	258 lb⋅ft (350 N⋅m) @ 1500–4000 rpm
2019–present	Cadillac XT4	237 hp (177 kW) @ 5000 rpm	258 lb⋅ft (350 N⋅m) @ 1500–4000 rpm
2020–present	Buick GL8 ES	237 hp (177 kW) @ 5000 rpm	258 lb⋅ft (350 N⋅m) @ 1500–4000 rpm
2020–2025	Buick GL8 Legacy	237 hp (177 kW) @ 5000 rpm	258 lb⋅ft (350 N⋅m) @ 1500–4000 rpm
2020–present	Buick Regal GS (Chinese market)	237 hp (177 kW) @ 5000 rpm	258 lb⋅ft (350 N⋅m) @ 1500–4000 rpm
2020–present	Cadillac CT5	237 hp (177 kW) @ 5000 rpm	258 lb⋅ft (350 N⋅m) @ 1500–4000 rpm
2020–present	Cadillac CT4	237 hp (177 kW) @ 5000 rpm	258 lb⋅ft (350 N⋅m) @ 1500–4000 rpm
2020–present	Cadillac XT5	237 hp (177 kW) @ 5000 rpm	258 lb⋅ft (350 N⋅m) @ 1500–4000 rpm
2020–present	Cadillac XT6	237 hp (177 kW) @ 5000 rpm	258 lb⋅ft (350 N⋅m) @ 1500–4000 rpm
2019–2025	Chevrolet Malibu XL	241 hp (180 kW) @ 5000 rpm	258 lb⋅ft (350 N⋅m) @ 1500–4000 rpm
2020–present	Chevrolet Blazer	230 hp (172 kW) @ 5000 rpm	258 lb⋅ft (350 N⋅m) @ 1500–4000 rpm
2020–2023	GMC Acadia	230 hp (172 kW) @ 5000 rpm	258 lb⋅ft (350 N⋅m) @ 1500–4000 rpm
2021–present	Buick Envision	230 hp (172 kW) @ 5000 rpm	258 lb⋅ft (350 N⋅m) @ 1500–4000 rpm
2020–present	Buick Lacrosse (Chinese market)	233 hp (174 kW) @ 5000 rpm	258 lb⋅ft (350 N⋅m) @ 1500–4000 rpm
2023–2026	Cadillac GT4	233 hp (174 kW) @ 5000 rpm	258 lb⋅ft (350 N⋅m) @ 1500–4000 rpm
2020–2022	Opel Insignia B	170 hp (127 kW) @ 4250–6000 rpm	350 N⋅m (258 lb⋅ft) @ 1500–4000 rpm
2020–2022	Opel Insignia B	200 hp (149 kW) @ 4250–6000 rpm	350 N⋅m (258 lb⋅ft) @ 1500–4000 rpm
2020–2022	Opel Insignia B	230 hp (172 kW) @ 5000 rpm	350 N⋅m (258 lb⋅ft) @ 1500–4000 rpm

=== 2.5 ===
==== LCV ====
First appearing in the 2013 Chevrolet Malibu and 2013 Cadillac ATS, the 2.5 L Gen III block has been reworked to reduce engine noise and vibrations, while improving fuel economy and low-end torque. LCV is scheduled to replace the direct-injected 2.4 L throughout North American GM products within a year. Engine production started in April 2012 at GM's Tonawanda Engine plant.

The new combustion system developed with GM's proprietary computational fluid dynamics (CFD) analysis software features a higher compression ratio which helps improve fuel efficiency and has improved knock resistance. The engine features dual overhead camshafts with continuously variable valve timing and increased-authority cam phasing (increased phase rotation angle), a high-pressure returnless direct-injection fuel system with camshaft-driven fuel pump delivering 750 psi (52 bar) at idle and 2,250 psi (155 bar) at full load, higher-flowing intake and exhaust ports in the cylinder head, electronic throttle control and pistons with jet-spray oil cooling. The engine redline is 7000 rpm.

The balance shafts are relocated from the cylinder block to oil pan module. The two-piece steel-aluminium oil pan features in-pan integrated oil-pump assembly driven by the balance shaft with a shorter inverted-tooth chain. Other improvements include inverted-tooth chain driving the camshaft, forged steel crankshaft, cast aluminium bedplate with main bearing cap inserts made of iron, high-pressure fuel rail with rubber-isolated assembly, acoustically shielded plastic cover for the intake manifold, and structurally enhanced aluminium camshaft cover and front cover. These improvements helped reduce noise intensity by 40% compared to the 2.4 L engine and change the noise signature into a higher frequency above 2,000 Hz. The engine also uses a variable-displacement oil pump and an actively controlled thermostat. Direct injection reduces emissions by 25%, while continuous cam phasing eliminates the need for an EGR system. Maximum engine speed is listed at 7000 rpm.

Displacement for the 2.5 L engine is 2,457 cc with an 88.0 mm (3.46 in) bore and 100.8 mm (3.97 in) stroke. Compression ratio is 11.3:1.

Year(s)	Model	Power	Torque
2013–2016	Cadillac ATS	202 hp (150.69 kW) @ 6300 rpm	191 lb⋅ft (259 N⋅m) @ 4400 rpm
2013	Chevrolet Malibu	197 hp (146.96 kW) @ 6300 rpm	191 lb⋅ft (259 N⋅m) @ 4400 rpm
2015–2022	Chevrolet Colorado	200 hp (149 kW) @ 6300 rpm	191 lb⋅ft (259 N⋅m) @ 4400 rpm
2015–2022	GMC Canyon	200 hp (149 kW) @ 6300 rpm	191 lb⋅ft (259 N⋅m) @ 4400 rpm
2016	Chevrolet Malibu Limited	196 hp (146 kW) @ 6300 rpm	186 lb⋅ft (252 N⋅m) @ 4400 rpm
2016–2025	Chevrolet Malibu	200 hp (149 kW) @ 6200 rpm	186 lb⋅ft (252 N⋅m) @ 4400 rpm
2017	Buick GL8	197 hp (147 kW) @ 6300 rpm	186 lb⋅ft (252 N⋅m) @ 4400 rpm
2017–2020	Buick Envision	197 hp (147 kW) @ 6300 rpm	192 lb⋅ft (260 N⋅m) @ 4400 rpm
2017–2021	GMC Acadia	194 hp (145 kW) @ 6300 rpm	190 lb⋅ft (258 N⋅m) @ 4400 rpm
2019–2021	Chevrolet Blazer	193 hp (144 kW) @ 6300 rpm	188 lb⋅ft (255 N⋅m) @ 4400 rpm

==== LKW ====
Same as the LCV but features Intake Valve Lift Control (IVLC) system provides two-stage variable valve lift in addition to continuous variable timing. Continuously commanded by the engine control unit, the valve rocker arm switches between high-lift and low-lift profiles on the camshaft, actuated by an oil control valve through a two-feed stationary hydraulic lash adjuster, allowing for either 4.0 or 10.5 mm lift. It also features a start-stop system. Maximum engine speed is listed at 7000 rpm.

Year(s)	Model	Power	Torque
2014–2019	Chevrolet Impala	196–197 hp (146–147 kW) @ 6300 rpm	186–191 lb⋅ft (252–259 N⋅m) @ 4400 rpm
2014–2015	Chevrolet Malibu	196 hp (146 kW) @ 6300 rpm	186 lb⋅ft (252 N⋅m) @ 4400 rpm
2019	Saleen S1	450 hp (336 kW)	400 lb⋅ft (542 N⋅m)

== HCCI ==
At Tech Show Torino 2008, GM Powertrain Europe announced the ignition-less HCCI (Homogeneous Charge Compression Ignition) mode of the direct injection version of 2.2 L engine. The HCCI version is equipped with two-step adjustable valve lift with variable cam phasing and advanced ECU with cylinder pressure sensors, uses a lean-burn cycle similar to that of a diesel engine, and is claimed to further reduce fuel consumption by 15%.
