= Cadillac XT4 =

Subcompact luxury crossover SUV

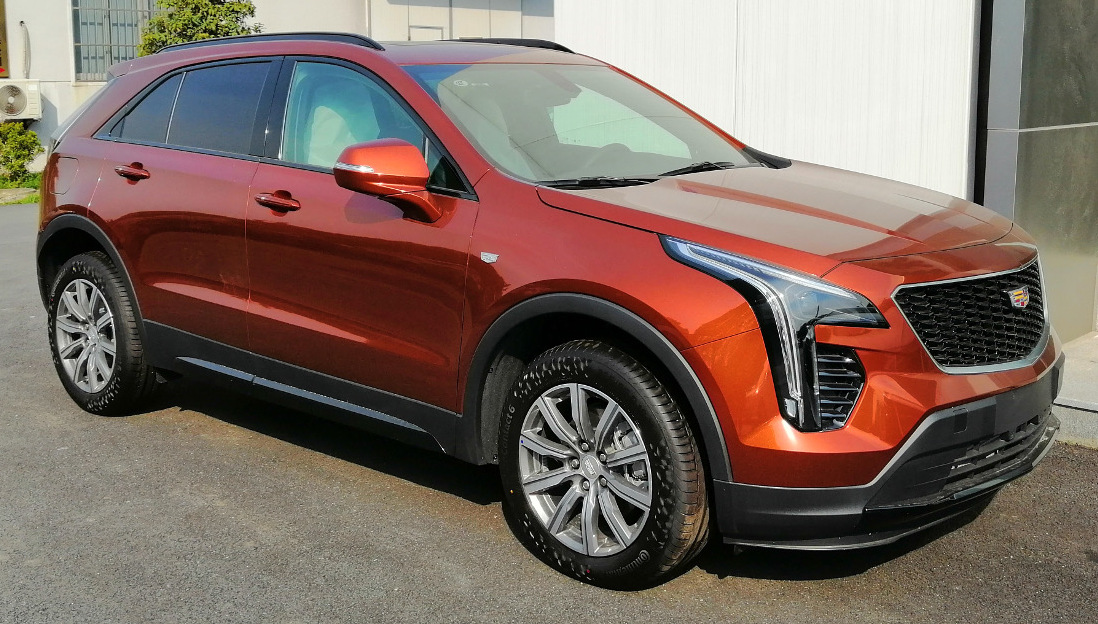
- Cadillac XT4

Overview
- Manufacturer: General Motors
- Production: 2018–present
- Model years: 2019–present (China); 2019–2025 (North America)
- Assembly: United States: Kansas City, Kansas (Fairfax Assembly); China: Shanghai (SAIC-GM)
- Designer: Therese Pinazzo (exterior)

Body and chassis
- Class: Subcompact luxury crossover SUV
- Body style: 5-door SUV
- Layout: Front-engine, front-wheel-drive or all-wheel-drive
- Platform: E2XX platform
- Related: Buick Envision (2021-)

Powertrain
- Engine: Gasoline: 2.0 L LSY turbo I4; Diesel: 2.0 L Multijet II (Europe)
- Transmission: 9-speed 9T50 automatic

Dimensions
- Wheelbase: 109.4 in (2,780 mm)
- Length: 181.1 in (4,600 mm)
- Width: 74.1 in (1,880 mm)
- Height: 64.1 in (1,630 mm)
- Curb weight: 3,660 lb (1,660 kg) (FWD, est.)

The Cadillac XT4 is a subcompact luxury crossover SUV manufactured since the 2019 model year by the luxury Cadillac division of General Motors.

== Overview ==
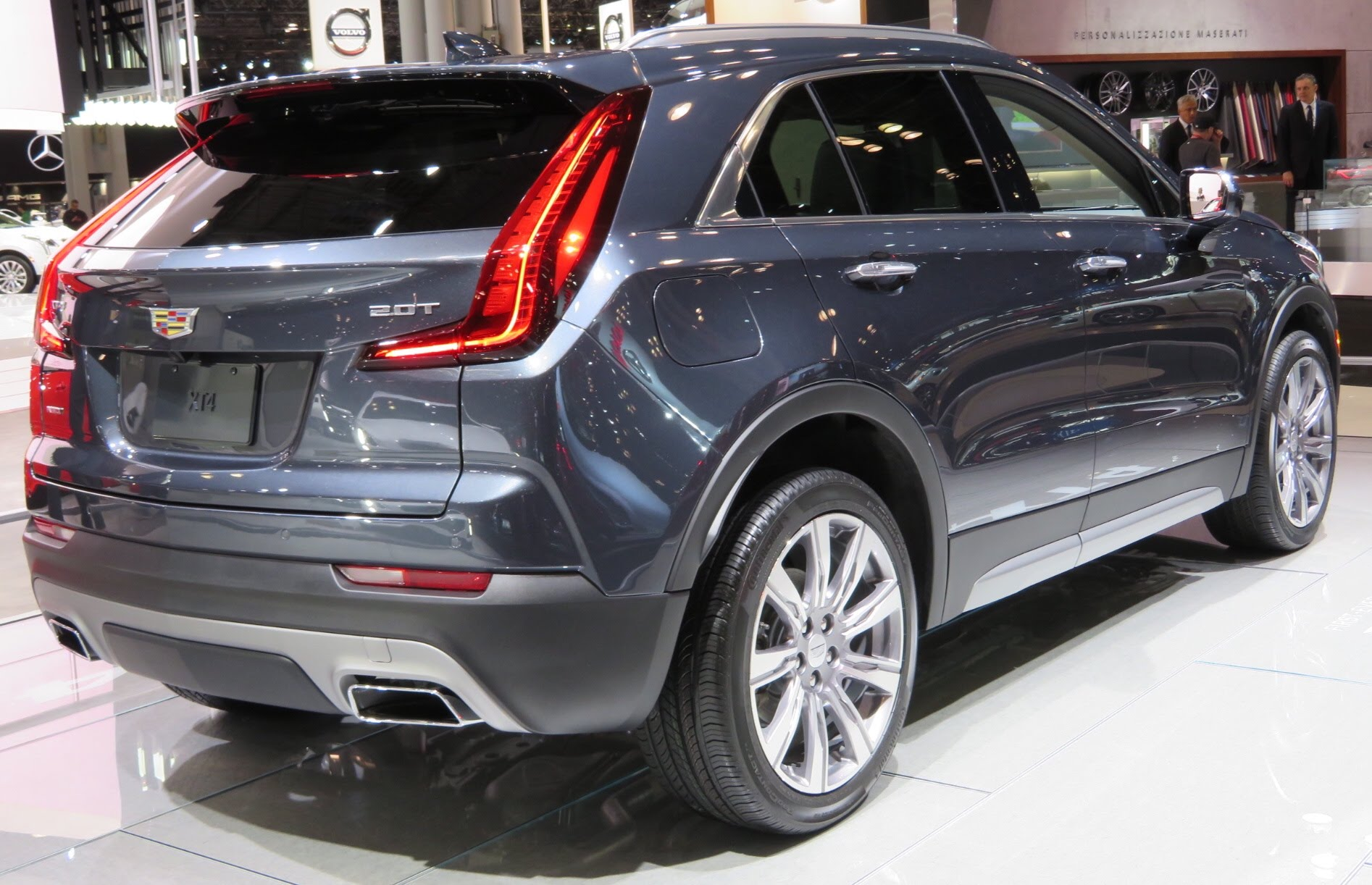
Cadillac XT4 rear

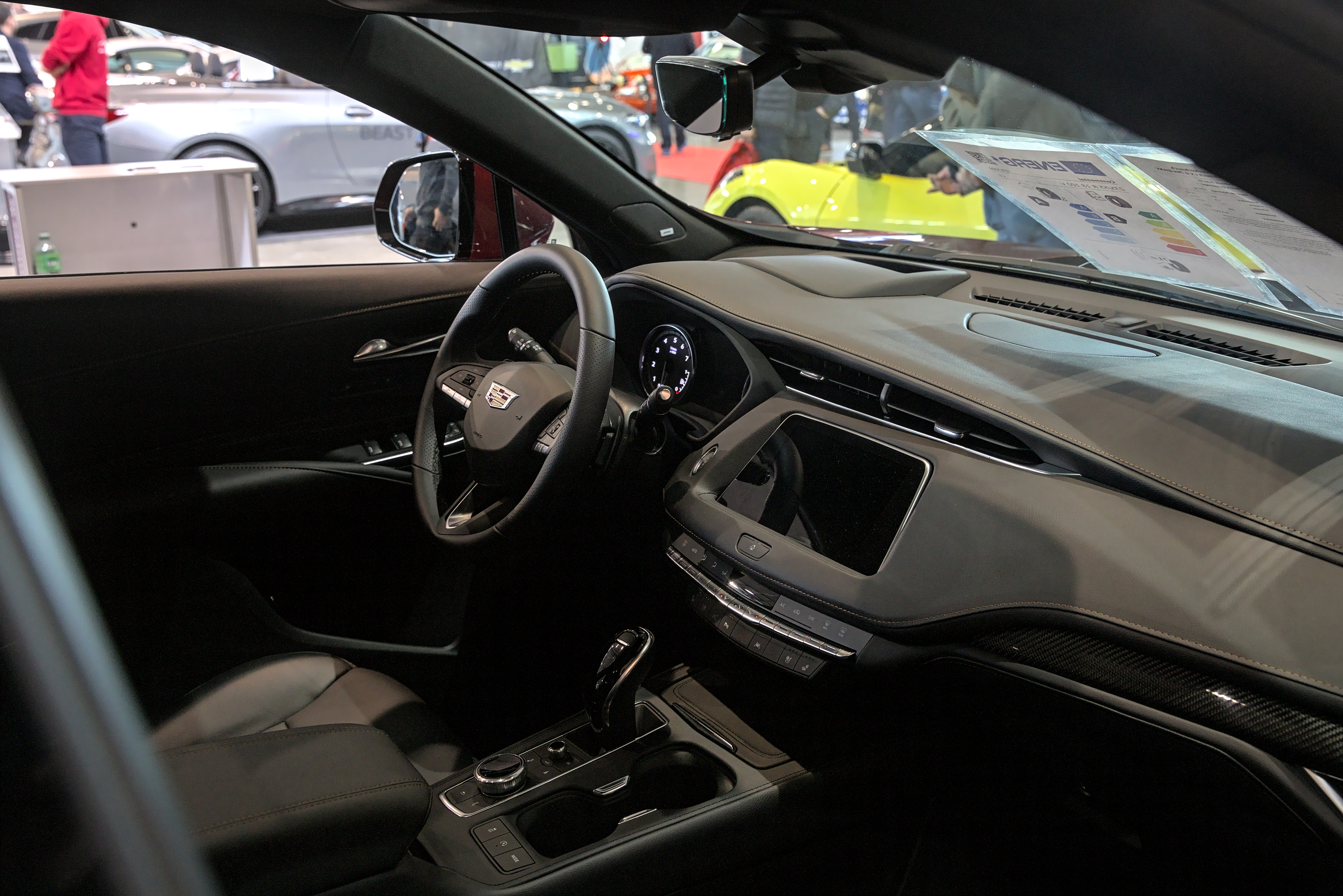
Interior

The XT4 (short for "Crossover Touring 4") is Cadillac's second crossover SUV, slotting below the mid-size Cadillac XT5, serving as the luxury equivalent to the Chevrolet Equinox and GMC Terrain. It is the third model to use Cadillac's new alphanumeric naming scheme (after the CT6 and XT5), and the second of three vehicles Cadillac is introducing in the Crossover Touring (XT) series, the third being the mid-sized three-row XT6 that debuted in 2019 as a 2020 model. It utilizes GM's E2 platform, shared with the Chevrolet Malibu and Opel Insignia/Buick Regal.

Cadillac introduced a teaser for the XT4 during a telecast of the 90th Academy Awards on March 4, 2018, and it made its official debut at the 2018 New York Auto Show on March 27, 2018. Cadillac started taking customer pre-orders shortly following the New York debut. Trim levels on the XT4 include "Luxury", "Premium Luxury", and "Sport".

The XT4 is produced at GM's Fairfax Assembly plant, and went on sale in the fall of 2018 as a 2019 model. The Chinese-market XT4 is manufactured in Shanghai by SAIC-GM.

=== Powertrain ===
The XT4 launched with an all-new turbocharged 2.0 liter four-cylinder engine, featuring Active Fuel Management and a start-stop system. Maximum output is 237 hp (177 kW) at 5000 rpm, and 258 lb⋅ft (350 N⋅m) of torque between 1500–4000 rpm. It is paired with a nine-speed automatic transmission, and is available in front wheel drive or all-wheel drive. In September 2020 the 2.0 Multijet Diesel engine became available exclusively for European market, rated at 172 hp (128 kW) and maximum torque of 280 lb⋅ft (380 N⋅m).

=== 2024 facelift ===
The XT4 was updated in 2023 for the 2024 model year featuring a restyled front end and updates to the interior including a 33-inch curved LED touchscreen display, an optional 13-speaker AKG stereo system, and the upgrade of the Wi-Fi hotspot to 5G.

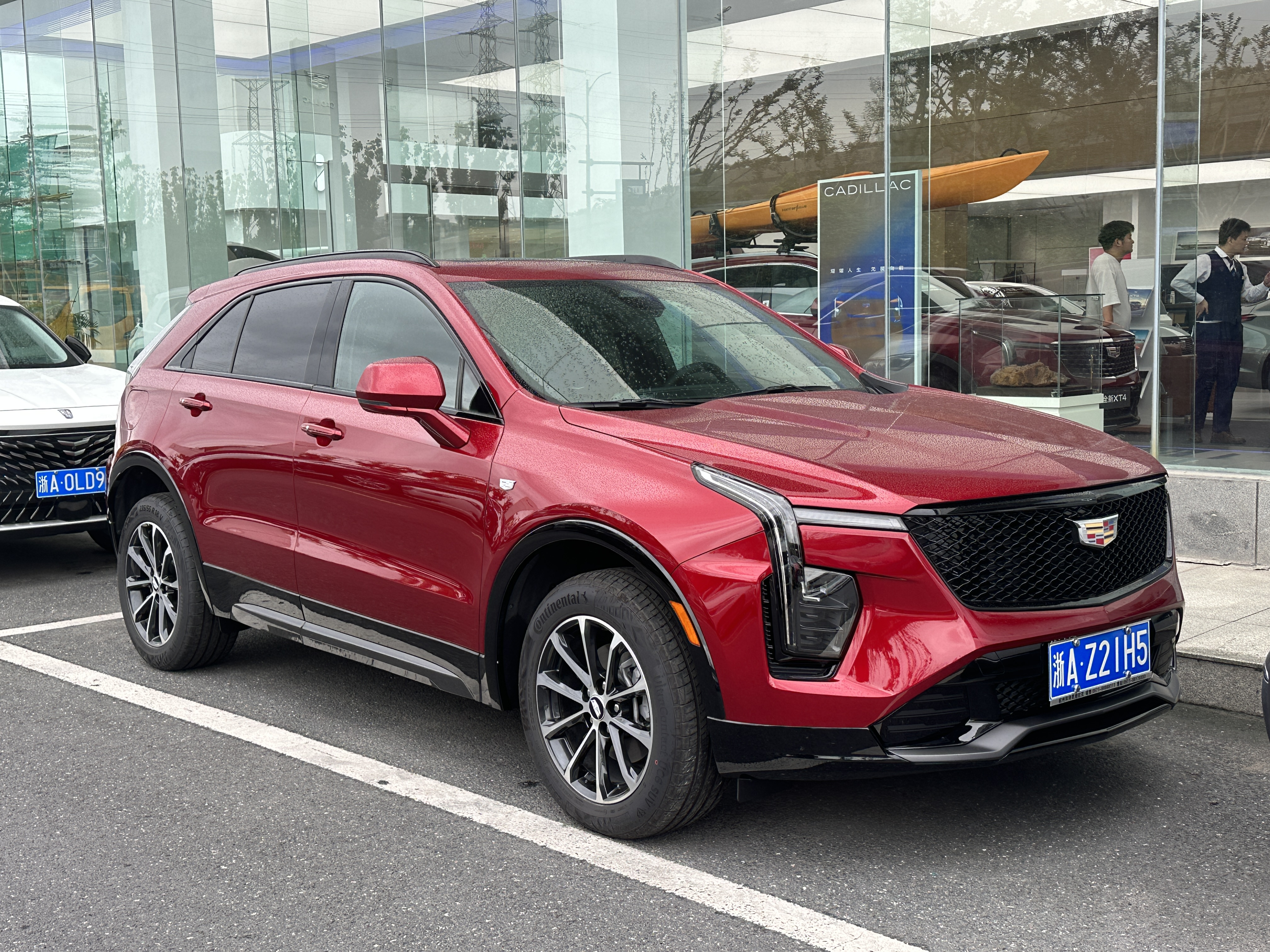
Cadillac XT4 (2023 facelift)

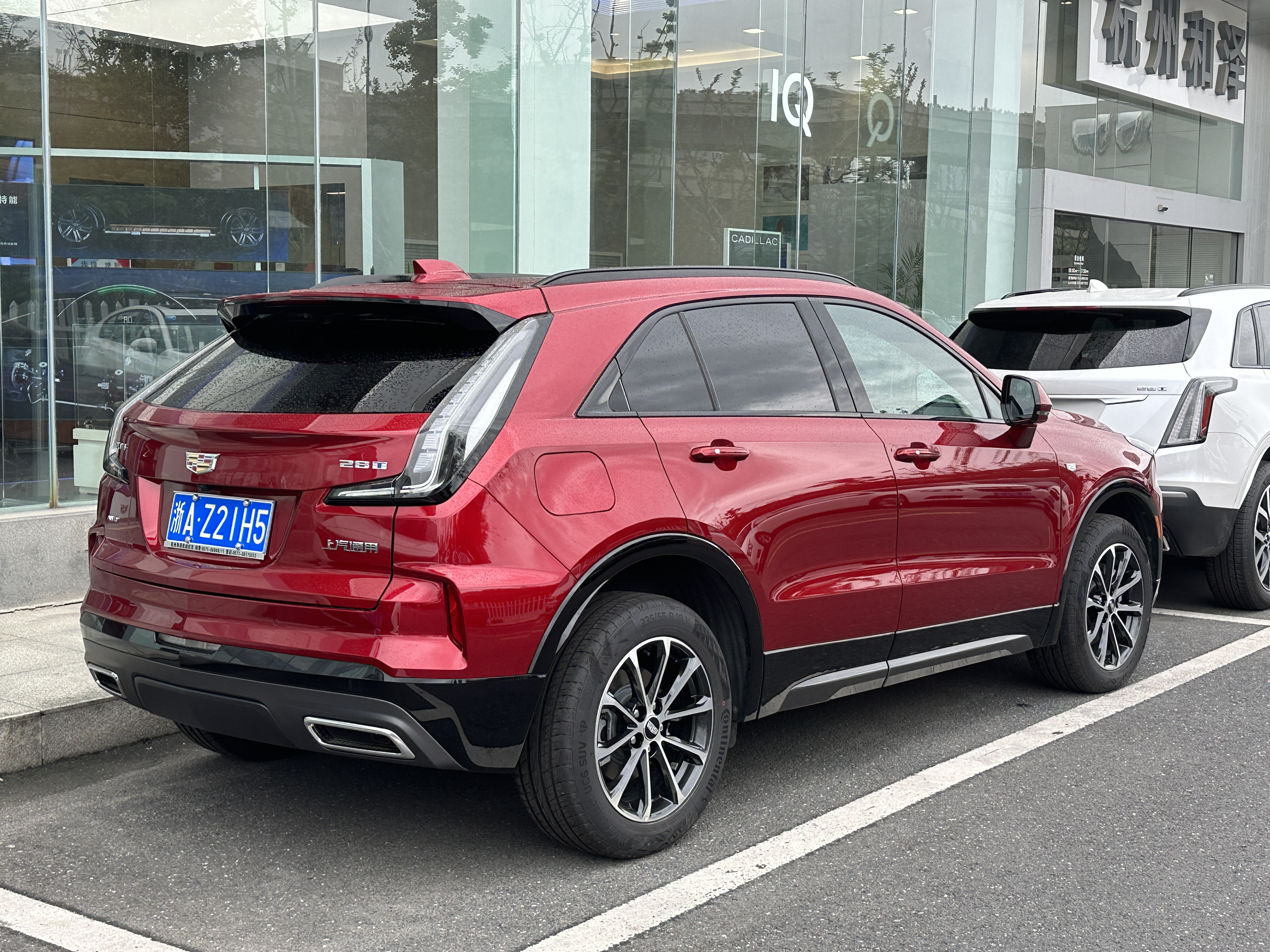
Cadillac XT4 (rear; 2023 facelift)

=== End of US production ===
The XT4 is discontinued in North America after the 2025 model year, with production concluded in January 2025, and no plans for a direct replacement. The Fairfax Assembly plant is retooled to manufacture the next-gen Chevrolet Bolt. The XT4 continues to be sold in the Chinese market.

== Sales ==
Calendar year	United States	China
2018	7,785	13,822
2019	31,987	47,054
2020	22,473	58,032
2021	11,579	47,521
2022	21,774	33,357
2023	22,707	21,152
2024	22,405	10,917
2025	11,058	10,427
