= Taxis of Venezuela =

Taxicabs of Venezuela is a form of public transport in Venezuela. At difference with most taxicab services in the world, in Venezuela there is not taximeter, nor any other form of measure the fare. The way it is measure is by a 'Carrera' which varies between driver. Due to this way of charging, it is a custom to ask and often negotiate the fare before getting inside the taxicab.

In Venezuela, there are three kinds of taxicabs: Whites, which are the most common kind found around big cities; they are commonly compact and subcompact cars, blacks which most of the time only serve in luxury hotels and some airports; this usually are SUVs and large size cars, and old multicolored which are mostly common in small towns and have cheaper fares.

== History ==
Before the mid-1990s, the taxis in Venezuela used to be old cars from the 1970s, 1960s, and sometimes even the 1950s with no uniform color or pattern. The only way to differentiate a taxi from a common car was by the yellow plates and small plastic signs on the top of the taxi. This with the exception of executives taxis (usually found on luxury hotels) that were plain black and with tinted windows.

In 1992, the Caracas government tried to persuade taxi owners to buy new, safer and more environmentally friendly cars by giving special credit incentives and offering a standardized taxi car. The first taxi fleet to be offered was the Fiat Premio in white with a yellow, black and blue checker sticker that would cover 1/3 of the doors in the middle. Those units were a complete failure because taxi drivers in the country were accustomed to drive heavy duty American cars from the 1970s and early 1980s like the Chevrolet Malibu, Dodge Dart and Ford Maverick, destroying most of the units in just a couple of years.

In 1997, the government tried again successfully the program of renewing the taxi fleet in Caracas. This time the fleet was made of a better powered Fiat Tempra specially assembled for taxi duties. These taxis were white with a vinyl checker yellow and black stripe on the doors. Also the congress passed a law allowing taxis to be sold without sales tax with the condition that they would keep the new color standard for taxis. By passing this law, other manufacturers created their own versions to compete in the emerging taxi market. Also a new fad was created, making most people feel safer driving the newer uniform cars than the old multicolor ones. Little by little the white taxis domain the country making the old ones something more rare each day.
