= Buick Regal =

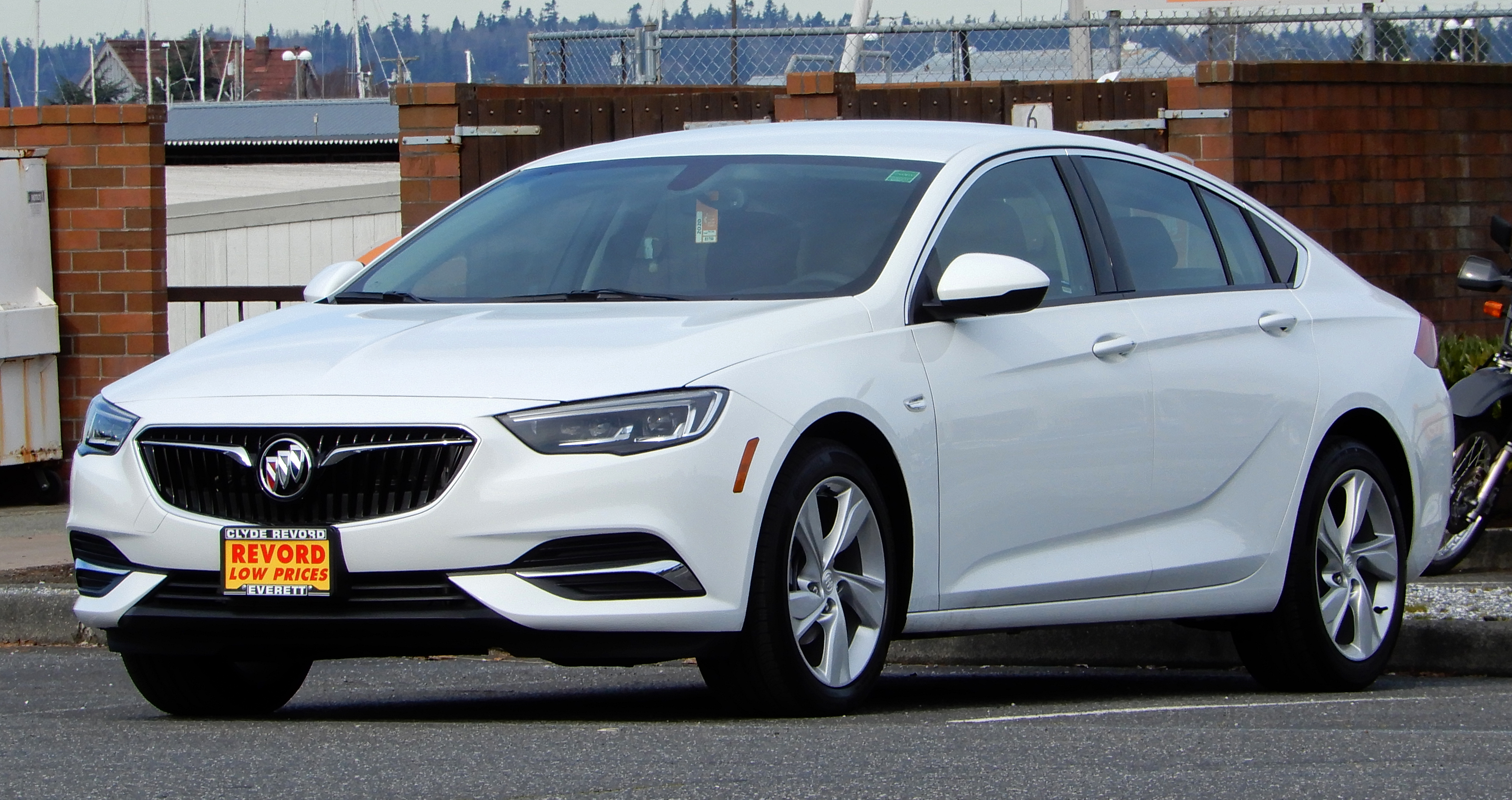
- 2020 Regal Sportback

Overview
- Manufacturer: General Motors
- Production: 1973–2004, 2010–2020 (North America)
- Model years: North America: 1973–2004, 2011–2020; China: 1999–present

Chronology
- Predecessor: Buick Skylark (2nd generation); Buick Century
- Successor: Buick LaCrosse

The Buick Regal is a line of mid-size cars marketed by Buick since 1973. Serving as the premium mid-size/intermediate car of the Buick product range for nearly its entire production, the Regal initially served as the divisional counterpart of the Pontiac Grand Prix and Oldsmobile Cutlass Supreme; since the late 2000s, the model line has been derived from the European Opel Insignia. The Regal also serves as the basis of the high-performance Grand National, Gran Sport (GS), and Buick GNX coupes.

Through its production, the Regal has been marketed under a wide variety of body styles, including two-door coupes and four-door sedans (currently in production), along with a 5-door liftback sedan and a 5-door station wagon; the latter (the 2018–2020 Regal TourX) was the first Buick station wagon marketed since the retirement of both the Century and Roadmaster Estates after 1996. The turbocharged LD5 3.8L V6 used in the second generation was used to showcase the motorsports presence of the brand; though offered with other vehicles (including Chevrolets and Pontiacs), the turbocharged engine is most commonly associated with the Regal. During the 1990s, the V6 regained forced induction, with a supercharger replacing the turbocharger.

In 1999, General Motors commenced sales of its vehicles in China, with the Buick Regal serving as its introductory model of the joint venture SAIC-GM. After 2004, Buick retired the model line in North America, as it replaced both the Regal and the Century with the Buick LaCrosse. Following the introduction of the second-generation Regal for China for 2008, the model line returned to North America for the 2011 model year as a rebadged Opel Insignia, slotted slightly below the LaCrosse. Following the introduction of the sixth-generation Regal (sourced entirely from Germany) for 2018, GM sold Opel to PSA (now Stellantis), ending sales in North America after the 2020 model year. Currently, the Insignia B-derived Regal remains in production by SAIC-GM.

== Background ==
In the full-size personal luxury car segment, Buick was the first GM division to market a vehicle (the 1963 Buick Riviera, debuting the GM E-body). As the segment expanded towards intermediate-size coupes, GM saw the introduction of a repackaged Pontiac Grand Prix for 1969 and an all-new Chevrolet Monte Carlo for 1970. The same year, Oldsmobile added a notchback roofline to its Cutlass Supreme coupe; repackaging it as an equivalent of the Grand Prix proved successful, as it became the brand's best-selling intermediate.

For 1973, GM introduced the "Colonnade" generation of its A-body intermediates. Developed in anticipation of increased rollover safety standards, GM eliminated hardtop rooflines completely (in favor of visually reinforced roof pillars); the designs were marketed as "pillared hardtops" (retaining frameless door glass on all body styles). Buick dropped the Skylark nameplate from its A-body range, replacing it with Century (last used in 1958 on its flagship B-body). As with other Colonnade intermediates, the Century was offered as a two-door and four-door sedan and a five-door station wagon.

After lagging behind Chevrolet, Oldsmobile, and Pontiac, Buick introduced an intermediate-size personal coupe for 1973, marketing the "Century Regal Colonnade Hardtop coupe". Along with a notchback roofline (with side opera windows), the Regal featured its own grille and taillamp lenses.

== First generation (1973) ==
First generation
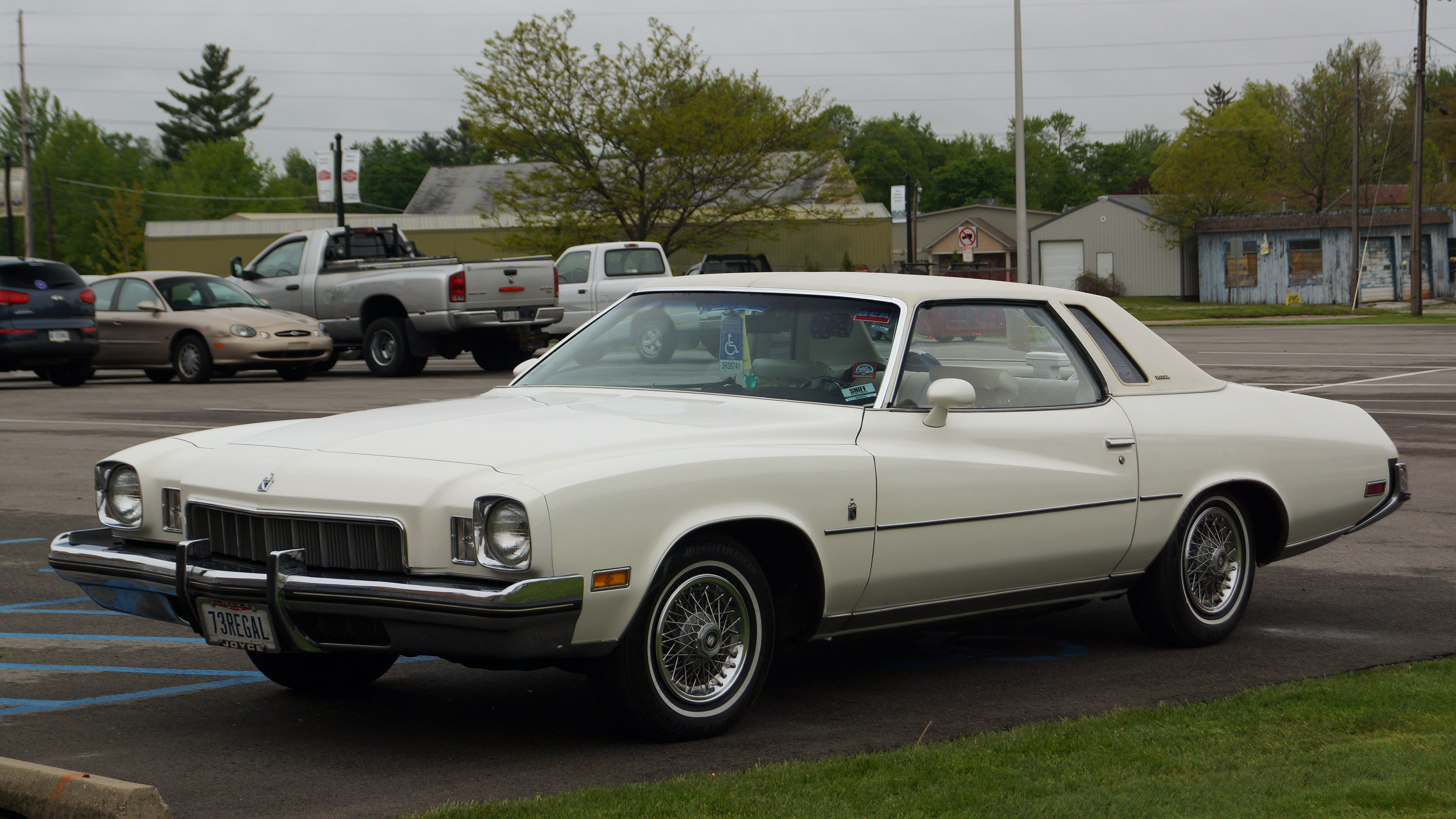
- 1973 Century Regal Colonnade Hardtop Coupe

Overview
- Also called: Buick Century Regal
- Model years: 1973–1977
- Assembly: United States: Flint, Michigan (Buick City); Baltimore, Maryland (Baltimore Assembly); Framingham, Massachusetts (Framingham Assembly); Fremont, California (Fremont Assembly)

Body and chassis
- Body style: 2-door coupe 4-door sedan
- Layout: FR layout
- Platform: A-body
- Related: Chevrolet Chevelle Laguna; Oldsmobile Cutlass Supreme; Pontiac Grand Am

Powertrain
- Engine: 231 cu in (3.8 L) Buick V6 (gasoline); 350 cu in (5.7 L) Buick V8 (gasoline); 455 cu in (7.5 L) Buick V8 (gasoline)
- Transmission: 3-speed Turbo-Hydramatic 350 automatic; 3-speed Turbo-Hydramatic 400 automatic

Dimensions
- Wheelbase: 112 in (2,800 mm) (coupe); 116 in (2,900 mm) (sedan)
- Length: 212 in (5,400 mm) (coupe); 216 in (5,500 mm) (sedan)
- Height: 53.3 in (1,350 mm) (coupe); 54.1 in (1,370 mm) (sedan)

For 1973, Buick introduced the Century Regal as the flagship model of its A-body intermediate line. As with the lower-priced Century Luxus coupe, the Regal shared its notchback roofline with the Chevrolet Monte Carlo, Oldsmobile Cutlass Supreme, and Pontiac Grand Prix. For 1974, the Century Regal adopted a four-door sedan from its parent line, which featured a slightly fastback roofline (the Colonnade station wagon only carried the Century Estate nameplate). For 1976, the Buick Regal became a distinct model line slotted above the Century.

Interiors were upgraded over standard Century trims, with Regals featuring woodgrain trim on the dashboard and door panels (equipped with door-pull straps). Bench seats with folding center armrests were standard, upholstered in either cloth, velour, or vinyl upholstery; a 60/40 split-bench seat was optional. The 1976-1977 Regal S/R coupe was offered with reclining bucket seats with corduroy upholstery.

The Colonnade-generation Regal saw relatively few changes through its production. Following revisions related to the 1974 addition of 5-mph bumpers, the front fascia underwent an update for 1976, incorporating rectangular-lens quad headlamps (horizontally-mounted on coupes, vertically stacked on sedans).

Over 500,000 Regal coupes were sold during this generation, though the model lagged behind the Monte Carlo and Cutlass Supreme; the latter had become among the best-selling car lines in America by 1976. The listed retail price for a 1976 Regal was $4,910 ($27,780 in 2025 dollars).

=== Powertrain details ===
The Regal was most commonly powered by a Buick 350 cu in (5.7 L) V8, which was the standard engine for 1973 and 1974; a Buick 455 cu in (7.5 L) V8 was optional. For 1975, Buick intermediates dropped the 455 V8, with the 350 V8 becoming an optional engine for Regal coupes. For 1975, a 231 cu in (3.8 L) V6 became the standard engine.

Designed by Buick, the V6 was developed for its initial Special/Skylark compacts in the early 1960s. In 1967, the tooling for the engine was sold to Kaiser Motors for use in Jeep vehicles (purchased by American Motors in 1970). In 1974, GM acquired the tooling and the rights to the V6 engine from AMC and reintroduced the Buick V6 engine for 1975. For 1975 and 1976, the Century and Regal were the only mid-size cars sold in America to offer V6 engines.

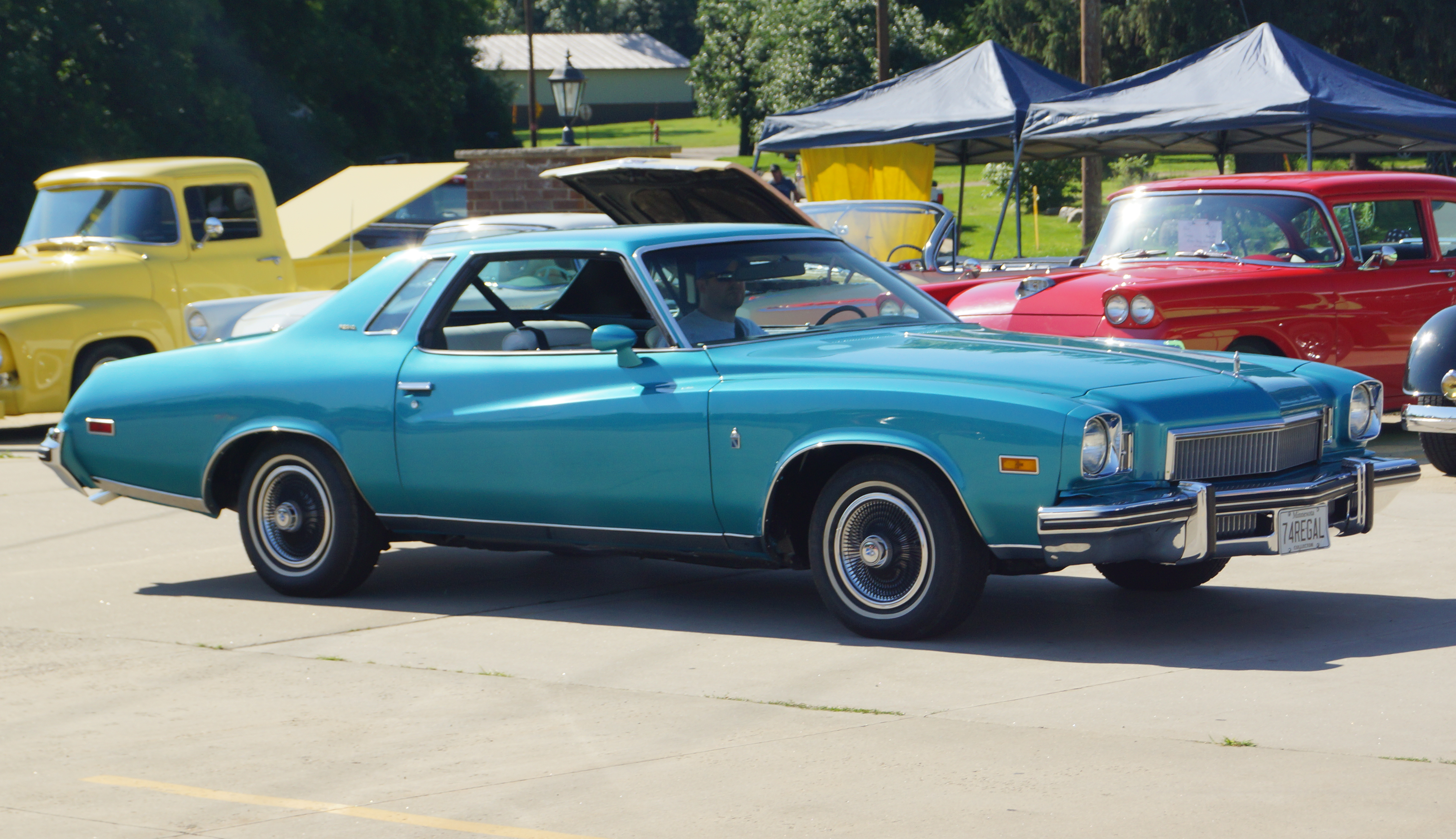
1974 Buick Century Regal Colonnade Hardtop Coupe

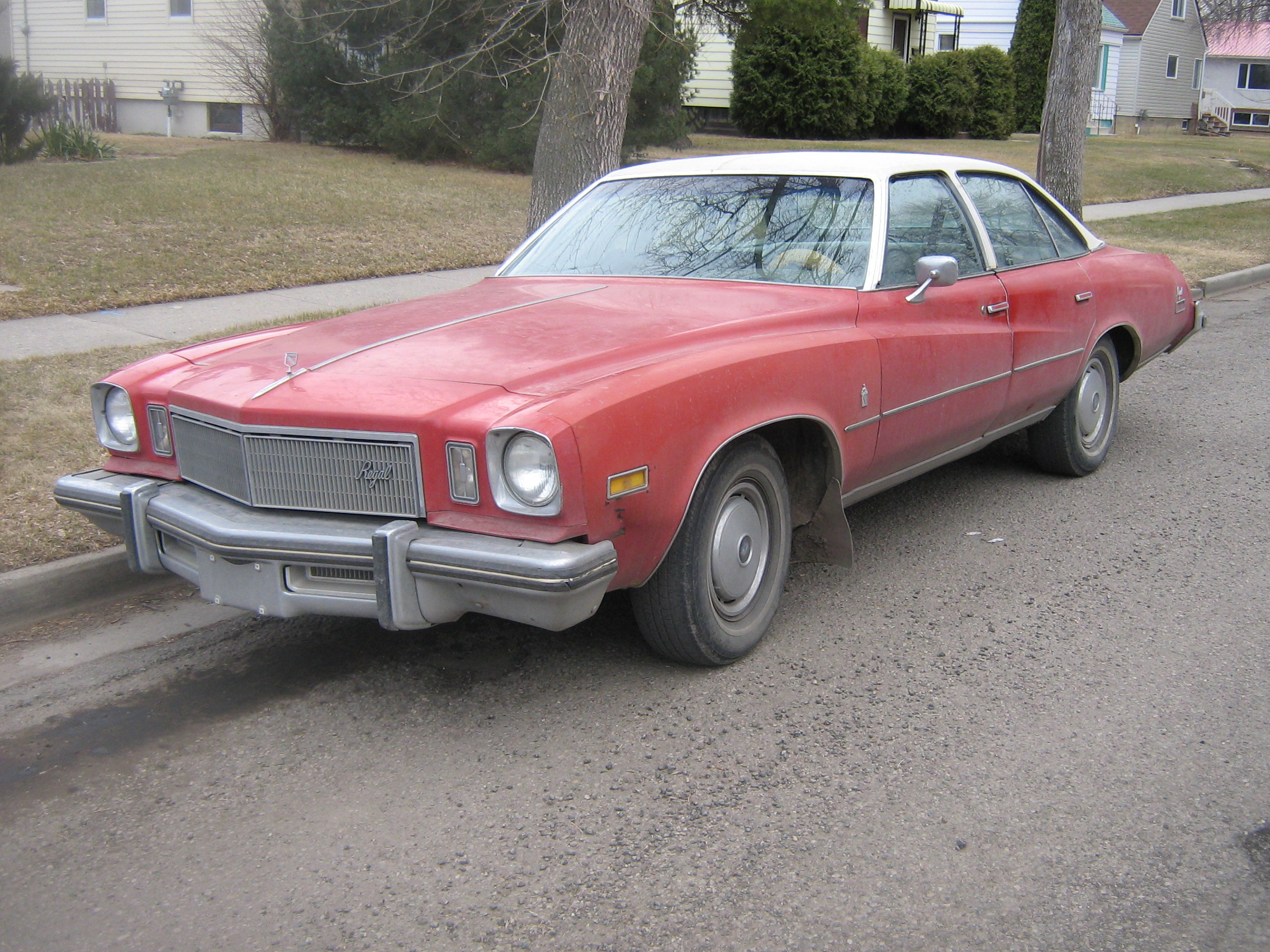
1975 Buick Century Regal Hardtop Sedan

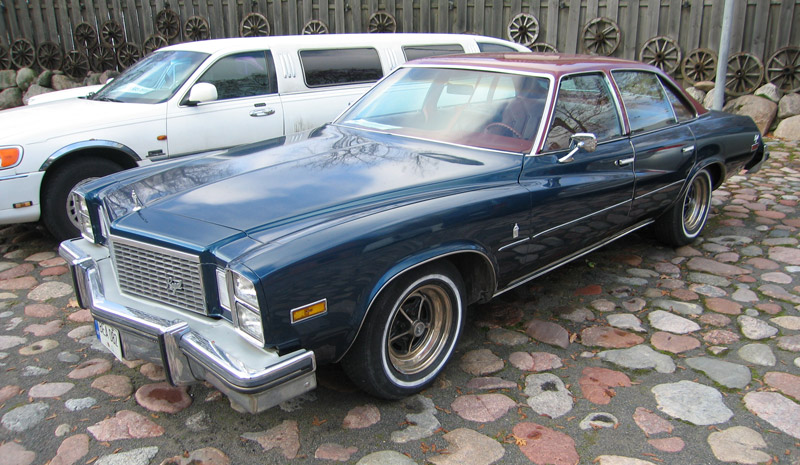
1976 Buick Regal 4-door sedan

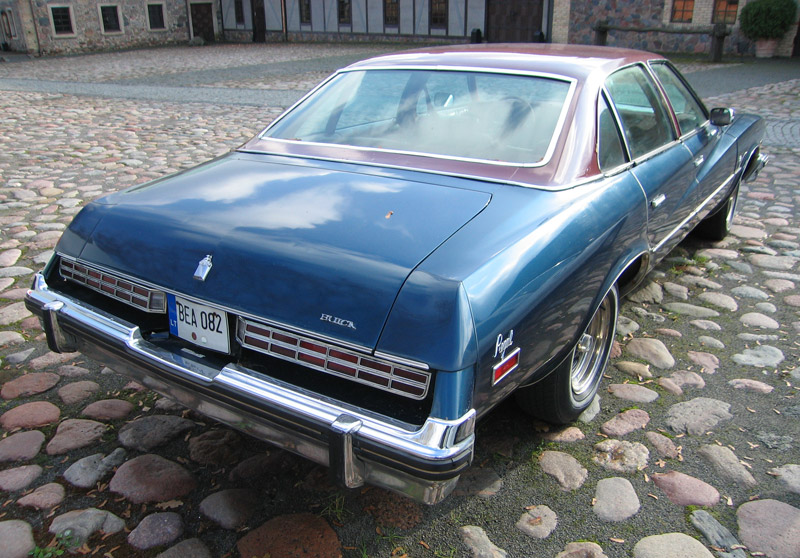
1976 Buick Regal 4-door sedan

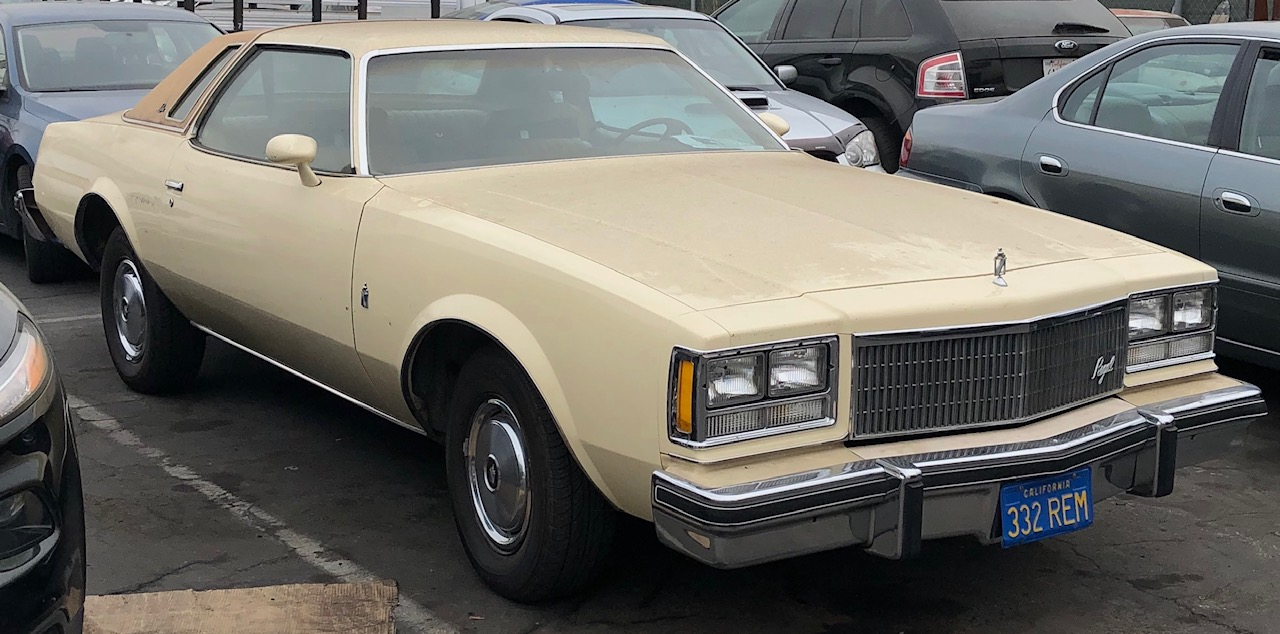
1976 Buick Regal Coupe

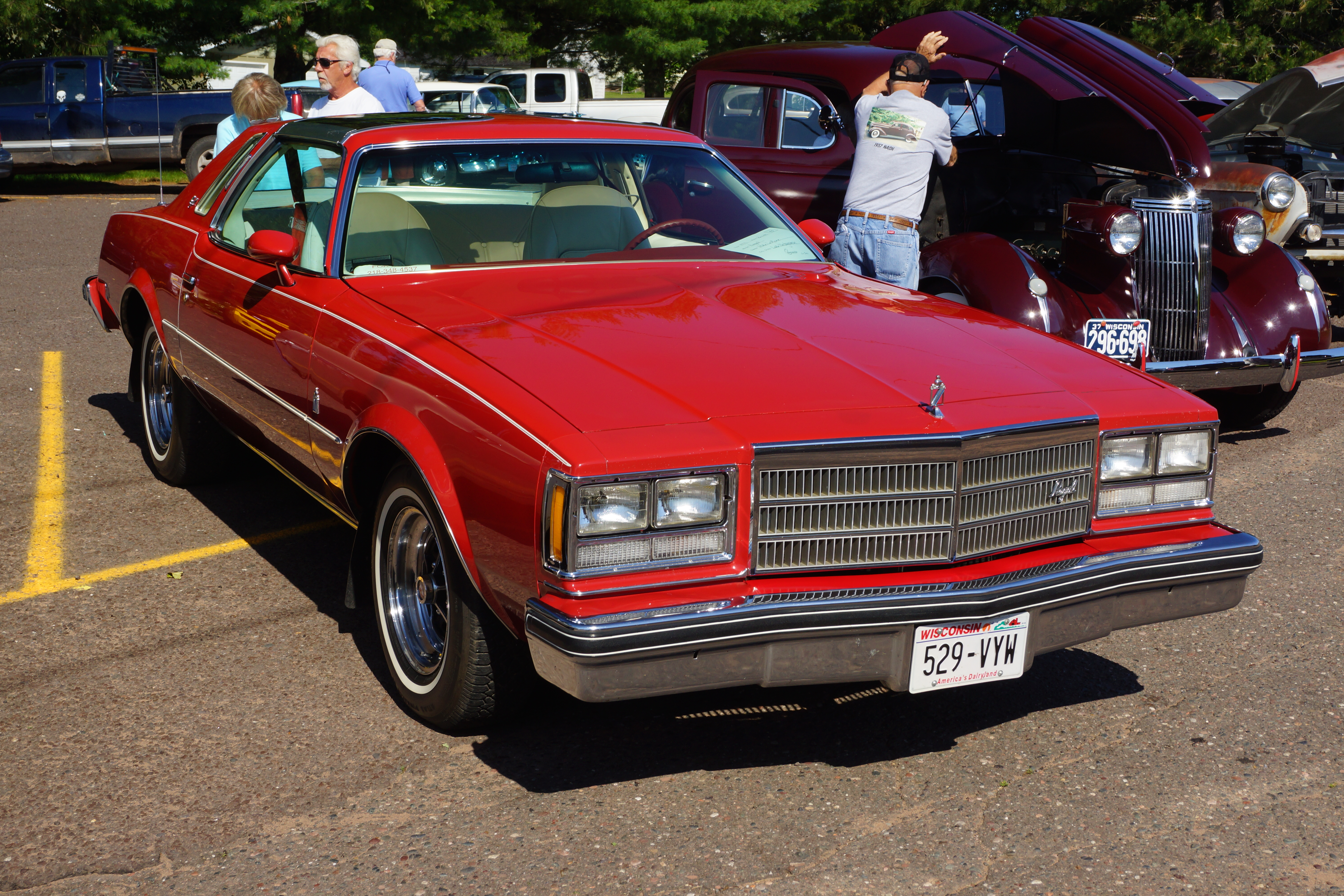
1977 Buick Regal Coupe

==== Production Figures ====
Buick Regal (Centuries were counted for total production in sources, excluded here.):
	Regal Coupe	Regal Sedan
1973	91,557	—
1974	57,512	9,333
1975	56,646	10,726
1976	124,498	17,118
1977	174,560	17,946
Total	504,773	55,123

== Second generation (1978) ==
Second generation
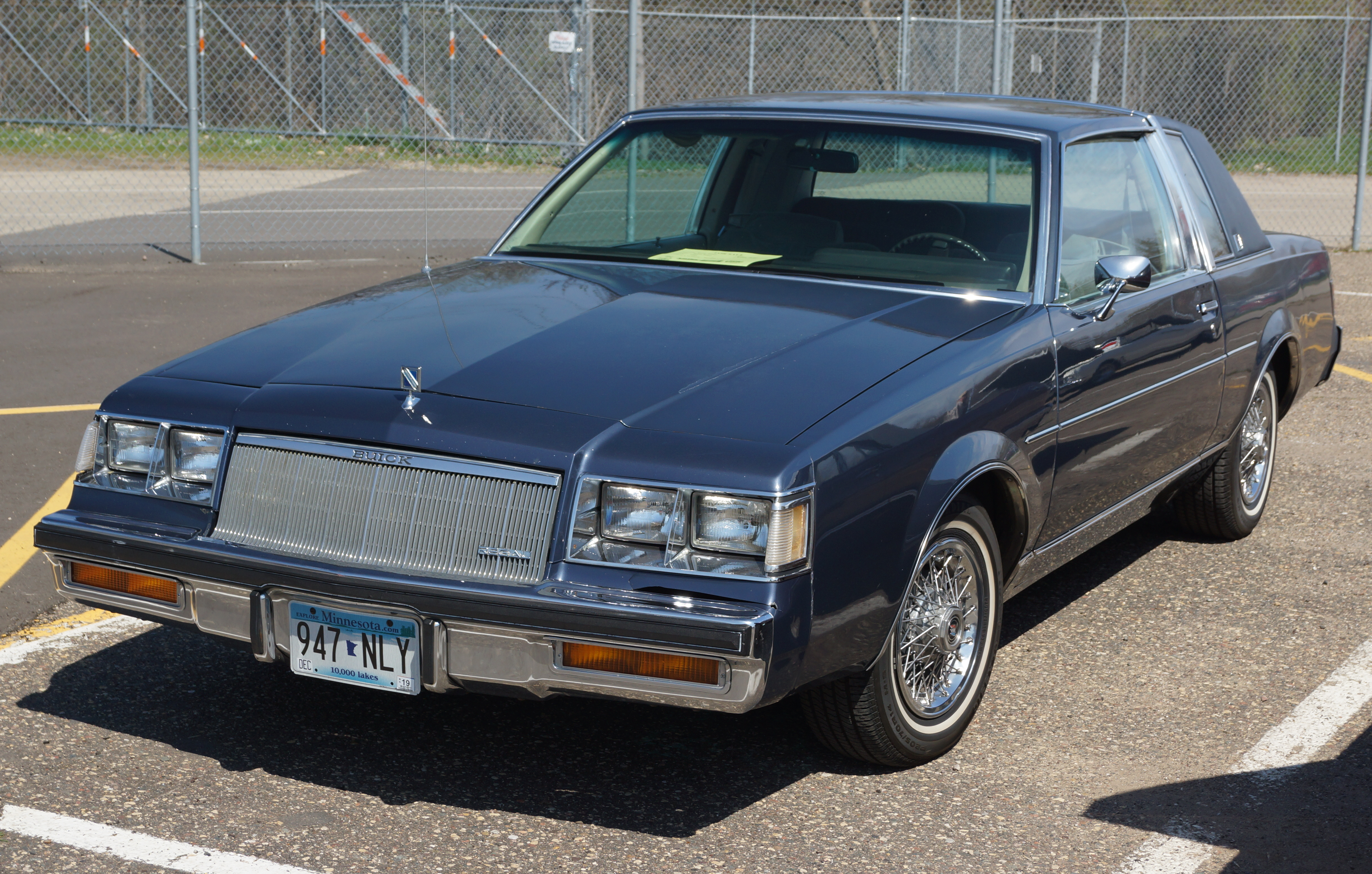
- 1984 Regal Limited

Overview
- Model years: 1978–December 1987
- Assembly: United States: Arlington, Texas (Arlington Assembly, 1982-1983); Flint, Michigan (Buick City, 1978-1985); Framingham, Massachusetts (Framingham Assembly, 1978-1981); Fremont, California (Fremont Assembly, 1978-1981); Kansas City, Missouri (Leeds Assembly); Pontiac, Michigan (Pontiac Assembly, 1985-1987)
- Designer: Gray Counts

Body and chassis
- Body style: 2-door coupé (1978-1987); 4-door sedan (1982-1984); 5-door station wagon (1982-1983)
- Layout: FR layout
- Platform: A-body (1978–1981); G-body (1982–1987)
- Related: Buick Century; Chevrolet El Camino; Chevrolet Malibu; Chevrolet Monte Carlo; Oldsmobile Cutlass; Oldsmobile Cutlass Supreme; Pontiac Bonneville; Pontiac Grand Am; Pontiac Grand Prix; Pontiac Le Mans

Powertrain
- Engine: Gasoline: 196 cu in (3.2 L) Buick V6; 231 cu in (3.8 L) Buick V6; 231 cu in (3.8 L) Buick V6 Turbocharged; 252 cu in (4.1 L) Buick V6; 265 cu in (4.3 L) Pontiac V8; 301 cu in (4.9 L) Pontiac V8; 305 cu in (5.0 L) Chevrolet V8; 307 cu in (5.0 L) Oldsmobile V8; Diesel: 260 cu in (4.3 L) Oldsmobile Diesel V6; 350 cu in (5.7 L) Oldsmobile Diesel V8
- Transmission: 3-speed manual; 4-speed manual; 3-speed THM200 automatic; 4-speed THM200-4R automatic

Dimensions
- Wheelbase: 108.1 in (2,745.7 mm)
- Length: 200.6 in (5,095.2 mm)
- Width: 71.6 in (1,818.6 mm)
- Height: 54.5 in (1,384.3 mm)

A downsized Regal appeared for the 1978 model year with Buick's new 196 cu in (3.2 L) V6 engine as standard equipment and a revised version of the venerable 231 cu in (3.8 L) V6 as an option (which became standard for 1980). Initially, a three-speed manual transmission was standard and a four-speed available, but the automatic option filled their places from 1980 onward. At the time of introduction, Regals were available exclusively as coupés with the Century nameplate applied to standard equipment sedans and station wagons. In January 1982 the Century was replaced by an all-new car on the front-wheel drive A platform, which meant that the Regal gained a four-door sedan and five-door station wagon - essentially facelifted and rebadged versions of the previous year's rear-wheel drive Century. It was the first time the name appeared on a full model lineup. The wagon was discontinued after 1983, and the sedan dropped from the lineup the next year. This generation Regal lasted ten years. The base model was equipped with softer-riding luxury suspension.

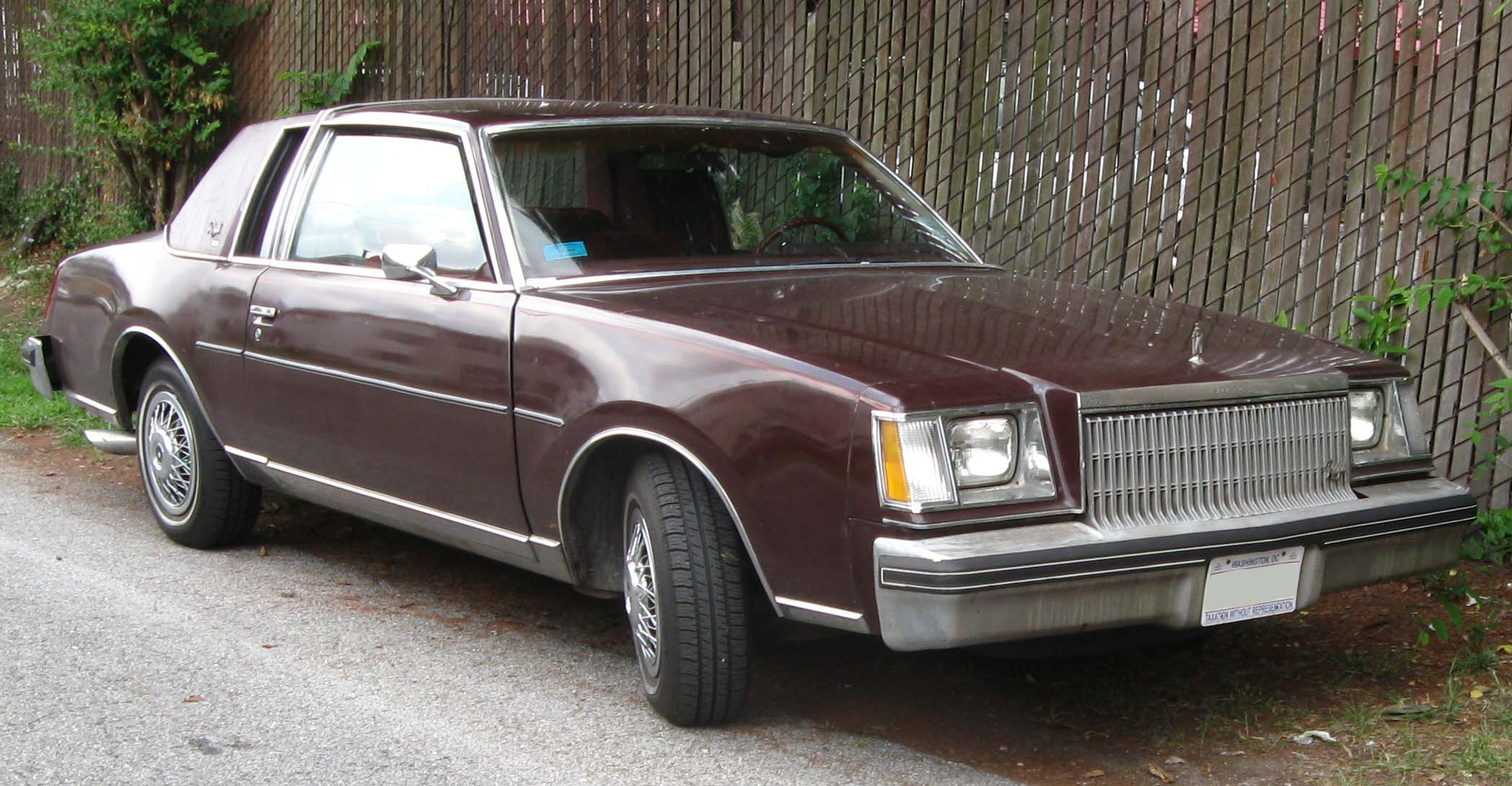
1979 Buick Regal Limited

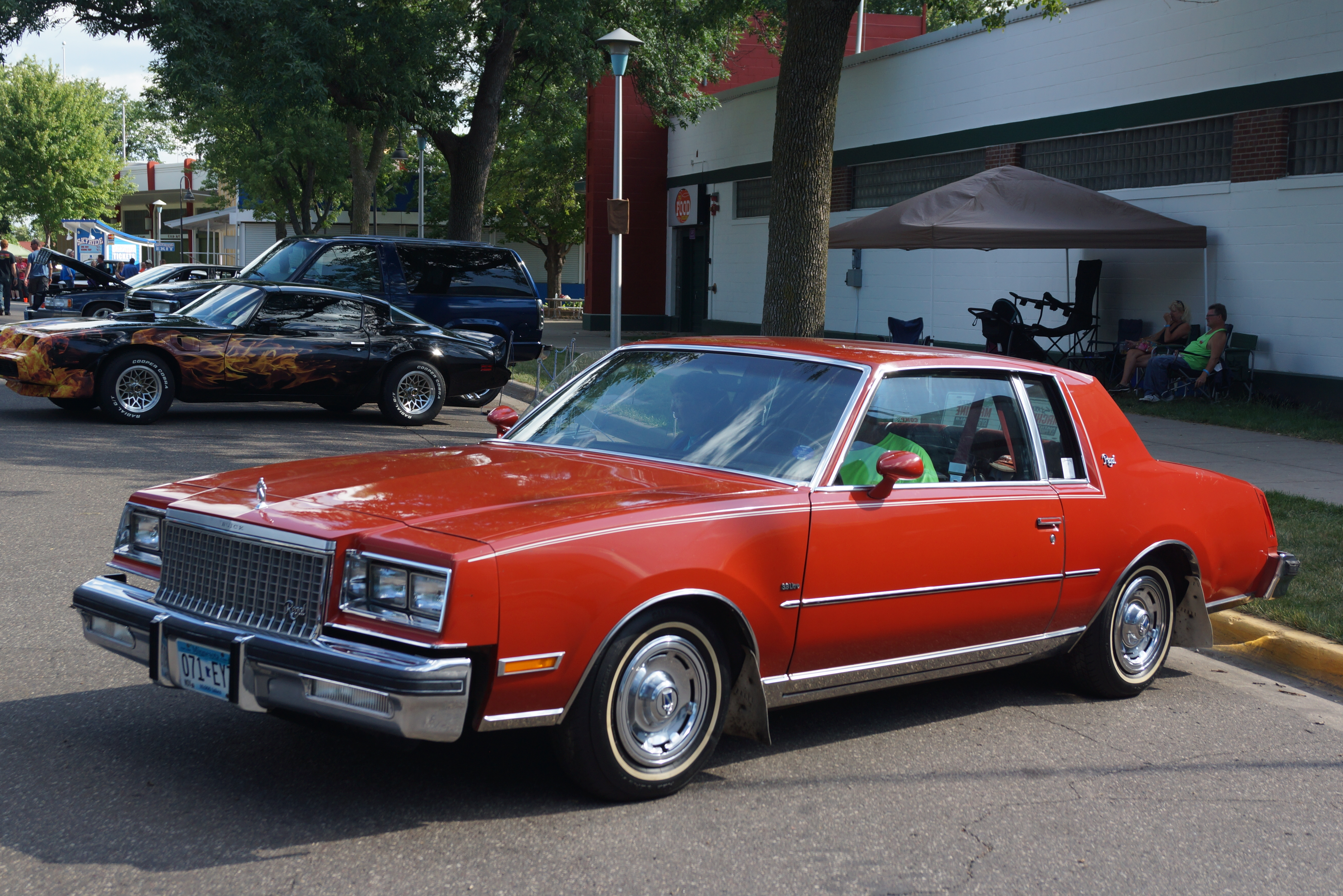
1980 Buick Regal

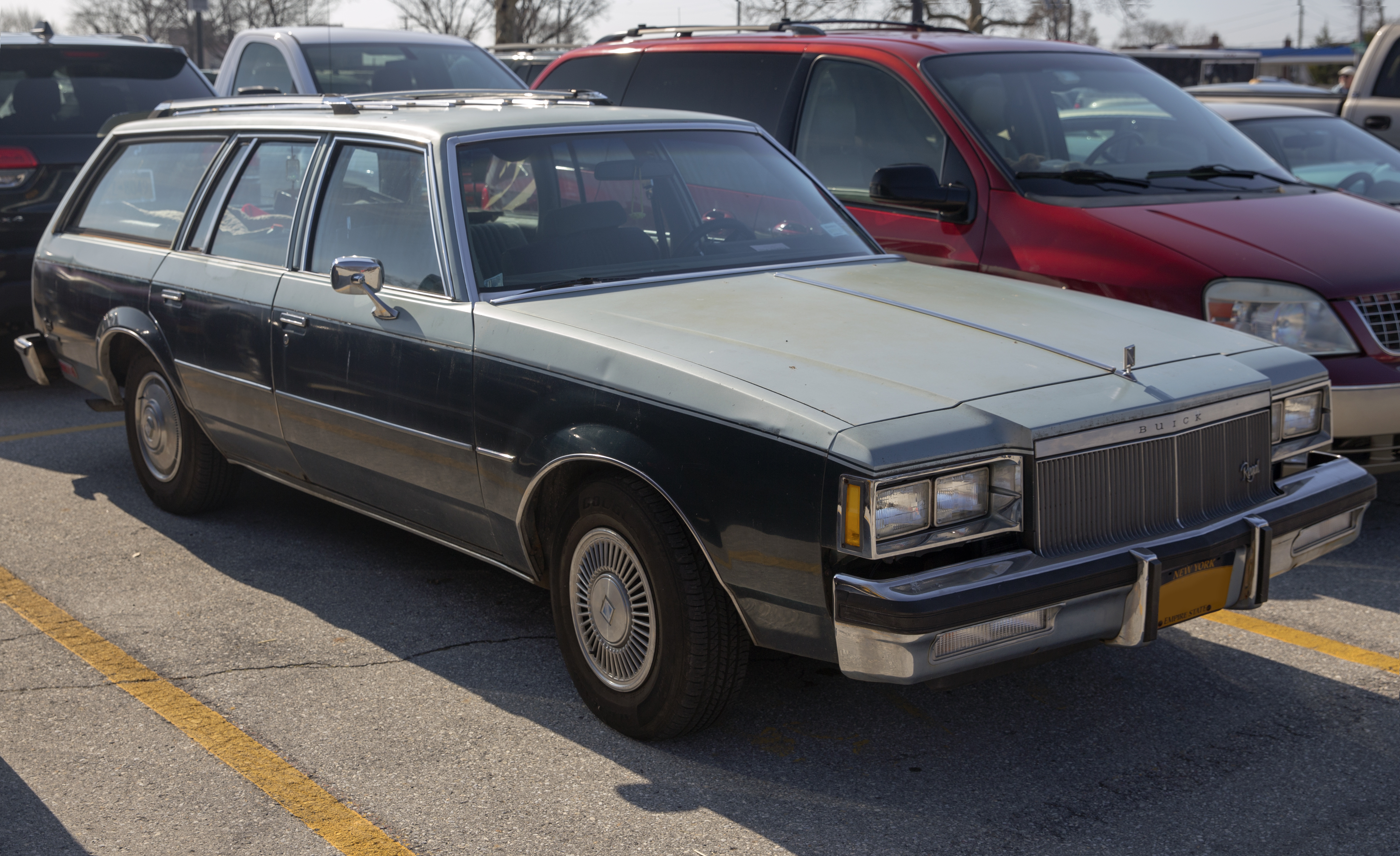
1982 Buick Regal Estate Wagon

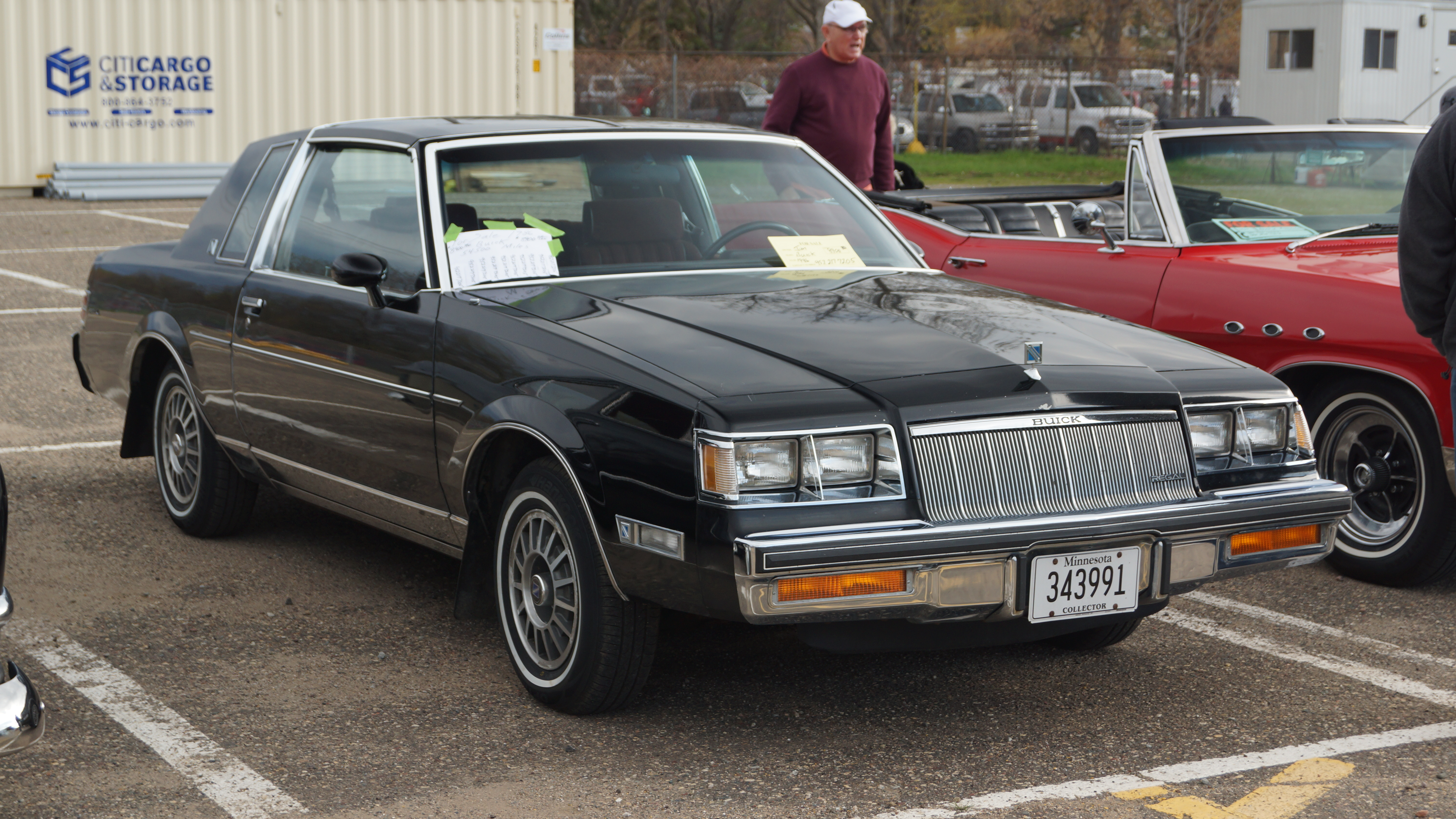
1986 Buick Regal Limited

The 1978 Regal could be equipped with a 3,791 cc (3.8 L; 231.3 cu in) Turbocharged V6 engine with automatic transmission; it was known in this configuration as a Regal Sport Coupe. The Buick LeSabre was also available with the turbocharged engine, the only other turbocharged cars available in the U.S. market in 1978 being imports from Mercedes-Benz, Porsche and Saab. The Regal Sport Coupe also included a firm handling suspension with larger tires and sport wheels. Bucket seats and a center console with a T-shifter were available.

For 1980, the Regal was offered in a special Somerset Limited Edition trim which featured unique tan and dark blue designer exterior paint, wire wheel covers, sport mirrors, and chrome Somerset badging. The interior had tan and blue plush velour upholstery, brushed chrome trim, and additional Somerset badging. A Somerset Limited Edition model was also offered on the restyled 1981 Regal. It had unique dark sandstone and camel exterior paint, sport mirrors, and turbine wheels. The interior's plush velour upholstery was camel with dark brown piping.

A major facelift for 1981 gave the Regal a much more aerodynamic profile, helping make it possible for the car to compete on the NASCAR racing circuit. The sloping hood and nose of the car made it the favorite of several NASCAR teams, and reduced the drag coefficient by eighteen percent. Richard Petty drove one to victory in the 1981 Daytona 500, and the car won a majority of the 1981 and 1982 seasons races and won the NASCAR manufacturers title in 1981 and 1982. Buick would remain the last marque other than Chevrolet or Ford to win the Cup Series manufacturers championship until Toyota scored its first in 2016. It also propelled Buick to #3 in sales after 26 years, remaining in that place through 1983.

V8s for street use were still available, but had shrunk to 265 cu in (4.3 L) (1980 and 1981 only, Pontiac built), and the V6 was rapidly gaining popularity. From 1986 to 1987, the 307 cu in (5.0 L) V8 was available as an option. The 3,791 cc (3.8 L; 231.3 cu in) 2-bbl V6 was standard. The 200-4R overdrive transmission was an option with either engine.

Production Figures:

Buick Regal Production Figures:
	Coupe	Sedan	Wagon	Yearly Total
1978	236,652	—	—	236,652
1979	273,365	—	—	273,365
1980	214,735	—	—	214,735
1981	123,848	—	—	123,848
1982	136,259	74,428	14,732	225,419
1983	151,667	61,285	15,287	228,239
1984	166,039	58,715	—	224,754
1985	124,546	—	—	124,546
1986	91,229	—	—	91,229
1987	65,285	—	—	65,285
Total	1,583,625	194,428	30,019	1,808,072

=== Grand National, Turbo-T and T-Type ===
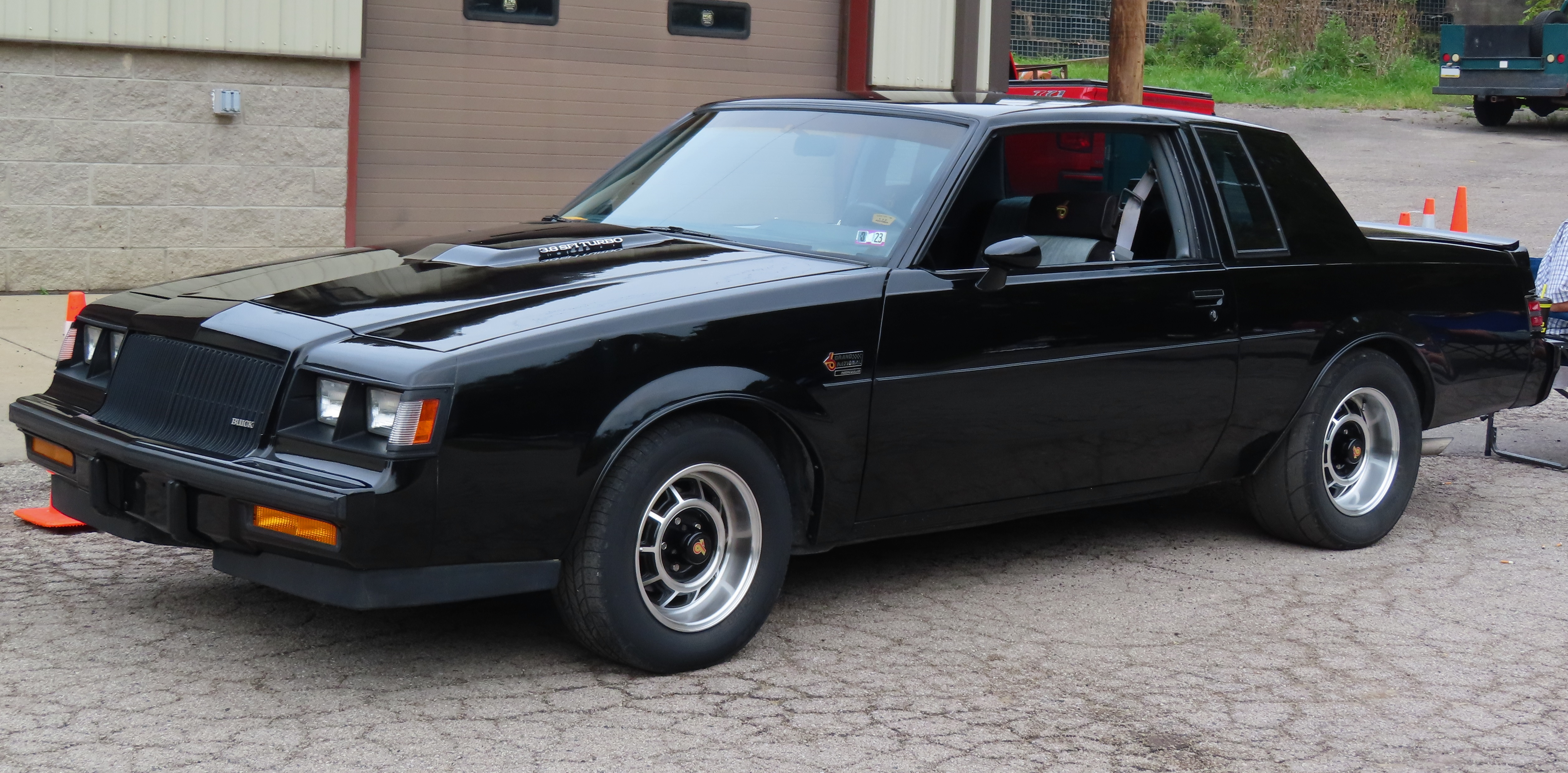
1987 Buick Regal Grand National

In 1978, the first turbocharged Regal was introduced as the Regal Sport Coupe. Turbo versions were originally offered with either a two- or a four-barrel carburetor and 150 or 165 hp (112 or 123 kW), but the two-barrel option was removed for 1979. Meanwhile, the four-barrel's maximum output increased to 170 hp (127 kW). Power remained unchanged until 1982, when it increased to 175 hp (130 kW) and then 180 hp (134 kW) in 1983, when the Regal T-Type replaced the Sport Coupe.

In February 1982, the Grand National debuted, which was named for the NASCAR Winston Cup Grand National Series (the "Grand National" term was part of the Cup series nomenclature until 1986). Buick had won the Manufacturers Cup in 1981 and 1982, and wanted to capitalize on its success: "What wins on Sunday, sells on Monday", and hoping to revive their performance image from the 1960s with the Buick Skylark Gran Sport. These 1982 cars were not painted black. All examples started out as charcoal gray Regals that were shipped off to a subcontractor for finishing.

Originally intended for a run of 100 units, Cars and Concepts of Brighton, Michigan, retrofitted 215 Regals with the GN package. Most obvious was the light silver-gray Firemist paint added to each side. Red pinstripes and billboard shadow lettering proclaiming "Buick" were applied. The wheel opening moldings and rocker panel moldings were blacked out using black vinyl tape. Finally, a front air dam and rear spoiler were installed. On the inside, special Lear Siegler seats were installed. These seats are fully adjustable and were covered with silver brandon cloth with black vinyl inserts. The front seat had Buick's "6" emblem embroidered onto it. Also, a special clock delete plate was added to the instrument panel, which contained the yellow and orange "6" logo and the words "Grand National Buick Motor Division".)

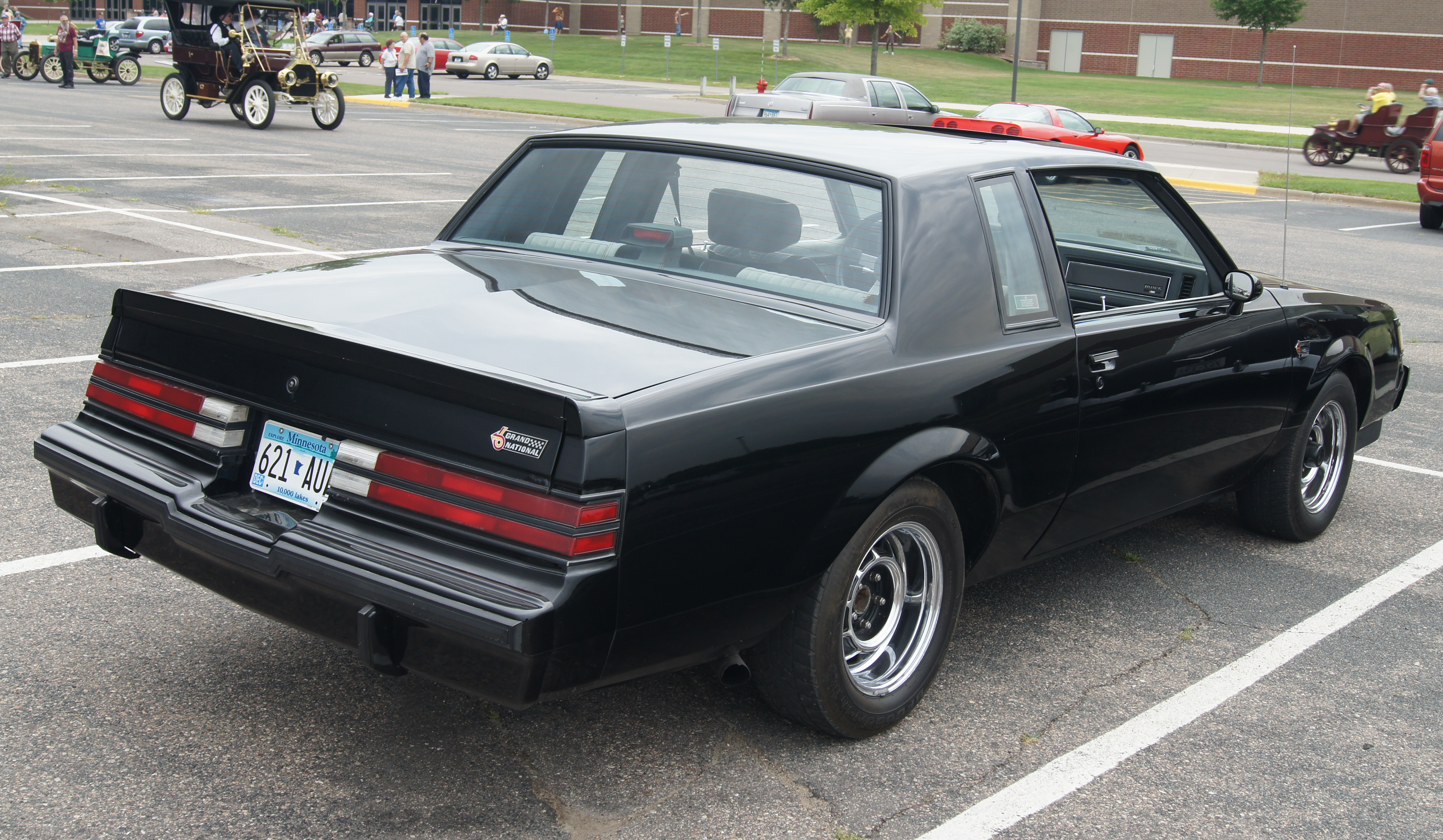
1987 Buick Regal Grand National

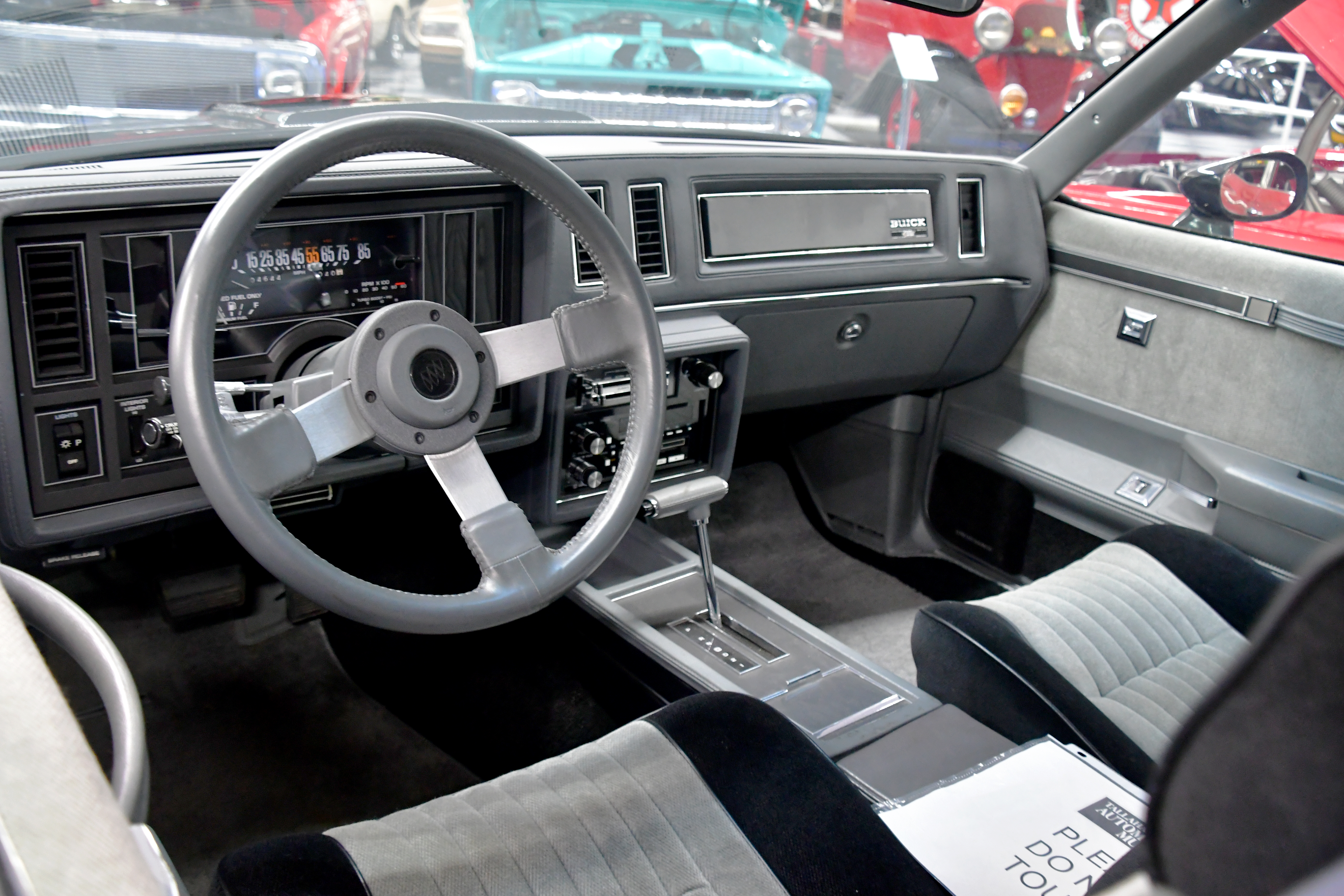
1987 Buick Regal Grand National interior

The 1982 GN came with a naturally aspirated 252 cu in (4.1 L) V6 engine with 125 hp (93 kW) at 4000 rpm and 205 lb⋅ft (278 N⋅m) of torque at 2000 rpm. Of the 215 Grand Nationals produced in 1982, at least 35 were based on the Buick Regal Sport Coupe package with the turbocharged 3,791 cc (3.8 L; 231.3 cu in) V6 engine with 175 hp (130 kW) at 4000 rpm and 275 lb⋅ft (373 N⋅m) of torque at 2600 rpm. Only 2022 Sport coupes were produced in 1982, and the number of cars with both the GN and Sport coupe packages is estimated to be fewer than 50.

For 1983, there was no Grand National. The Sport Coupe model was renamed the T-Type; 3,732 were produced (180 hp (134 kW) at 4000 rpm and 280 lb⋅ft (380 N⋅m) of torque at 2400 rpm). The power gains came courtesy of a low-restriction dual exhaust, stainless steel headers (rather than the original cast iron items), and other detail improvements. Drivability improved thanks to better electronics for the exhaust gas recirculation system and the knock sensor. The T-Type trim name had been used on other Buicks, starting with the Riviera in 1981 (in 1979 and 1980, it was the S-Type). Other improvements on the 1983 Regal T-Type included Hydro-Boost II brakes, 200-4R four-speed overdrive transmission replacing the earlier three-speed, and a 3.42 rear axle (7.5"). Inside there were new bucket seats and a sport steering wheel and quicker steering ratio, while the suspension was honed with a larger diameter anti-roll bar, altered spring rates, and re-valved shock absorbers.

In 1984, the Grand National returned, now in all-black paint. The turbocharged 3,791 cc (3.8 L; 231.3 cu in) became standard and was refined with sequential fuel injection, distributor-less computer-controlled ignition, and boasted 200 hp (149 kW) at 4400 rpm and 300 lb⋅ft (407 N⋅m) of torque at 2400 rpm. Only 5,204 turbo Regals were produced that year, only 2,000 of which were Grand Nationals. Because this was the first year of production of the computer-controlled sequential fuel injection and distributor-less ignition, this is often considered the year and model that started the development of the legendary intercooled Grand Nationals. The performance of this package was well ahead of its time, and the "little V6" easily kept up with the bigger V8s. 1/4 mile (402 m) performance was listed at 15.9 seconds at stock boost levels of 10 psi (0.69 bar), while for the same year, the Chevrolet Camaro V6 was listed at 17.0 and the Chevrolet Corvette at 15.2 seconds.

For 1985, the Grand National remained unchanged.

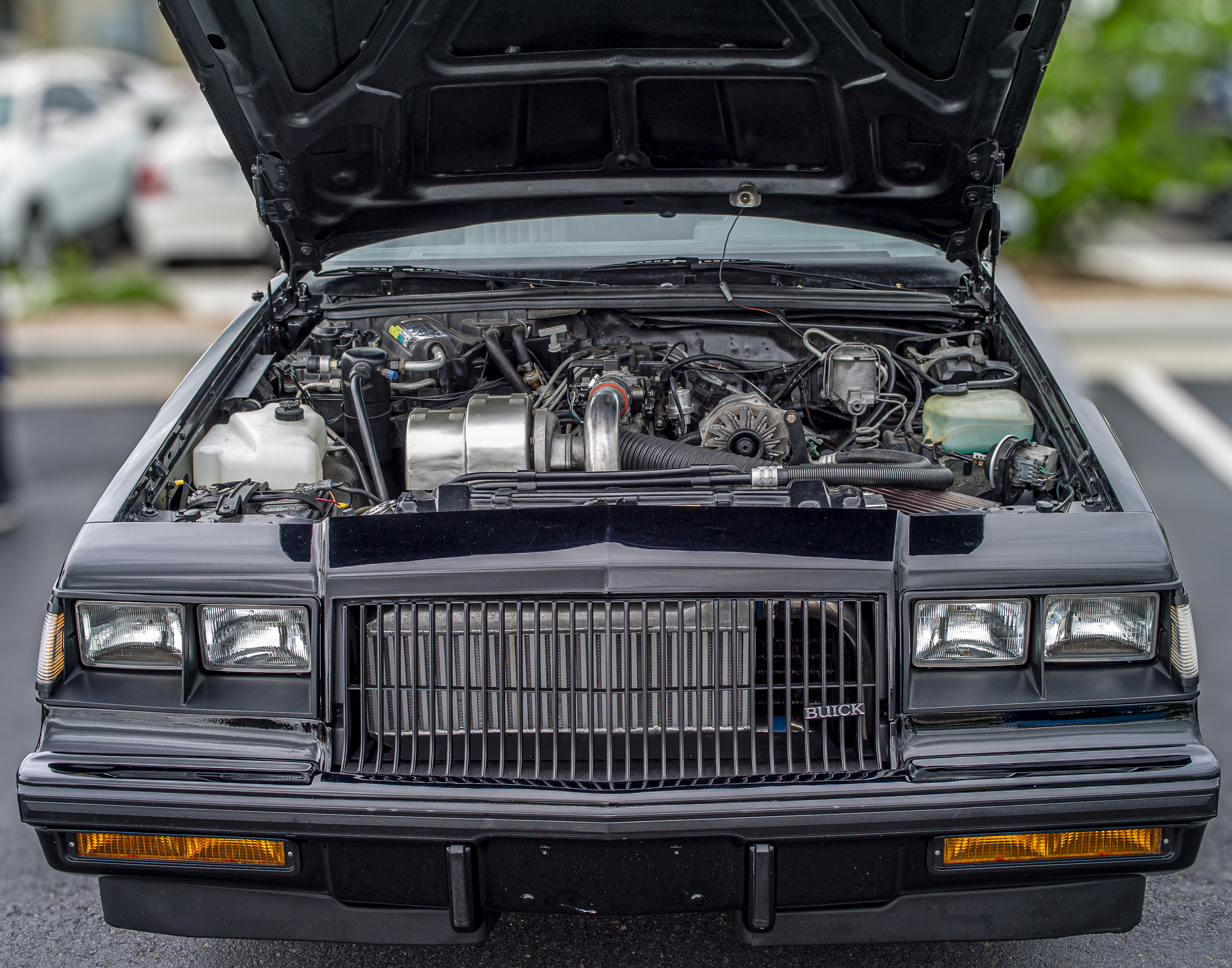
1987 Buick Regal Grand National Engine. Visible factory Garrett turbocharger on 3.8 Liter V-6.

For 1986, a modified engine design with air-air intercooling boosted the performance even further to a specified 235 hp (175 kW) at 4000 rpm and 330 lb⋅ft (447 N⋅m) of torque at 2400 rpm. The Grand Nationals (quantity 5,512) and T-Types (quantity 2,384) were both produced in 1986. For 1987, performance increased 10 hp, to 245 hp (183 kW) and 355 lb⋅ft (481 N⋅m) of torque; however, no design revisions were made to the engine or systems. Buick dropped the T-Type package for Regal for 1987 models and opted for a "T" sport package instead. Only 7,896 turbo Regals were produced in 1986. In 1987, when turbo Regals reached their peak in popularity, a total of 27,590 turbo Regals were produced through December, with those models produced between September and December of that year window stickered as "1987½ Buick Grand National" vehicles.

For 1987, a lightweight WE4 option was offered. Only 1,547 of this variant were produced. The differences between a WE4 and the Grand National were the interior trim package, wheels, exterior badging, aluminum bumper supports, and aluminum rear drum brakes, unlike the Grand National's cast iron, making the WE4 a lighter and faster car. The rear spoiler was only available as a dealer-installed option. 1987 was the only year the LC2 turbo option was available on any Regal, making a Limited with a vinyl landau roof and a power bulge turbo hood combination possible. Turbo Regal Limiteds were the second-rarest model of turbo Regals produced, after the GNX, at 1,035. Turbo Regal Limiteds could be ordered with many options, with most having chrome external trim, but for $35 could have been built with the full blackout trim WO2 option, making them extremely rare. Similarly, a base Regal could be ordered with the Turbo 6, and the WO2 blackout trim was also available. Limiteds were treated to a very luxurious interior with plush carpeting, optional bench pillow seats, and a column shift. It was also possible to order the 1987 Regal T with the 5.0/307 V8 instead of the turbo 3.8/231 V6. The 1987 model would be the end of the manufacture of the RWD "G-Body" Regal, but GM had to extend the build of the Grand National to meet customer demand into December.

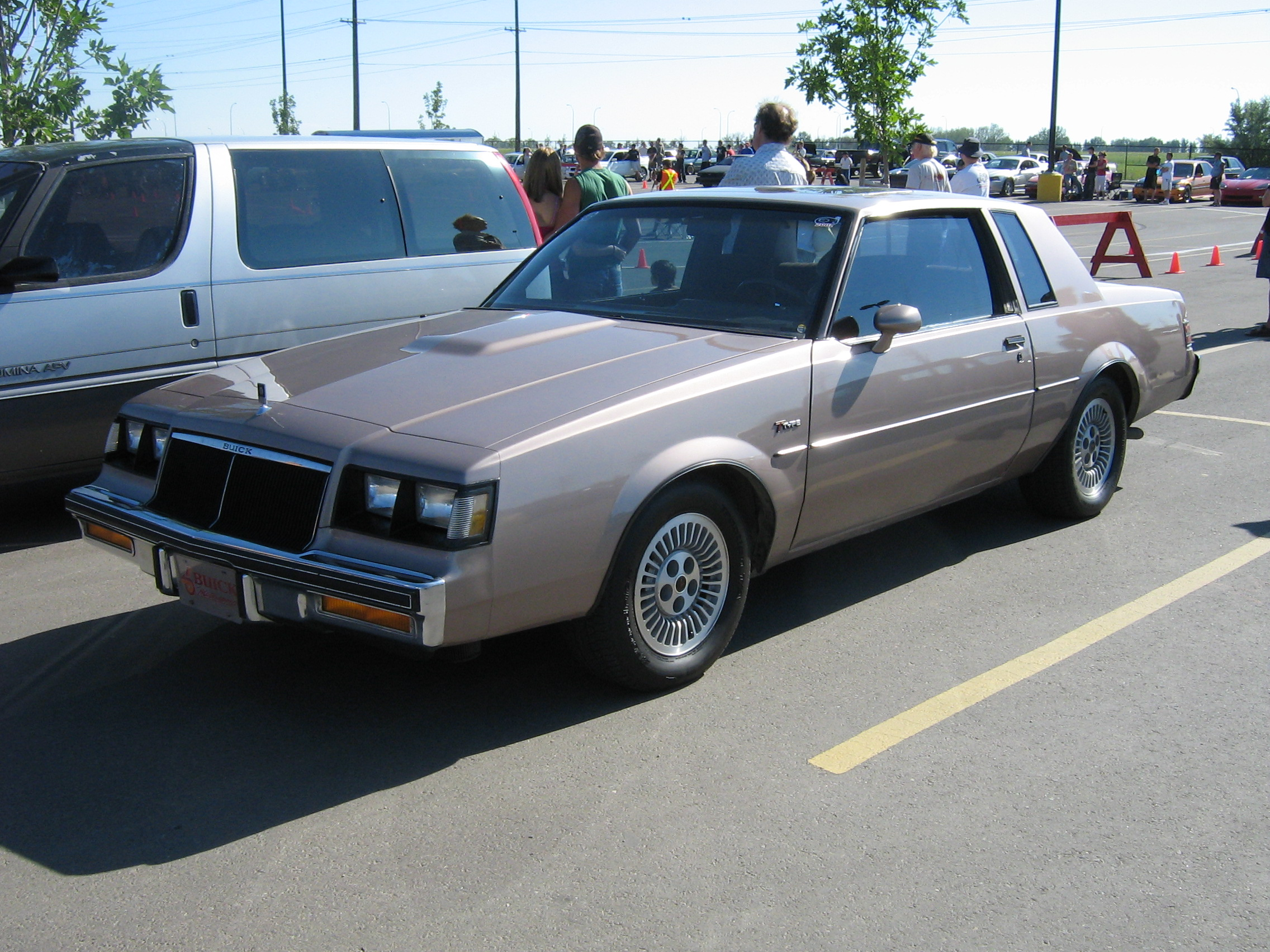
Buick Regal T-Type

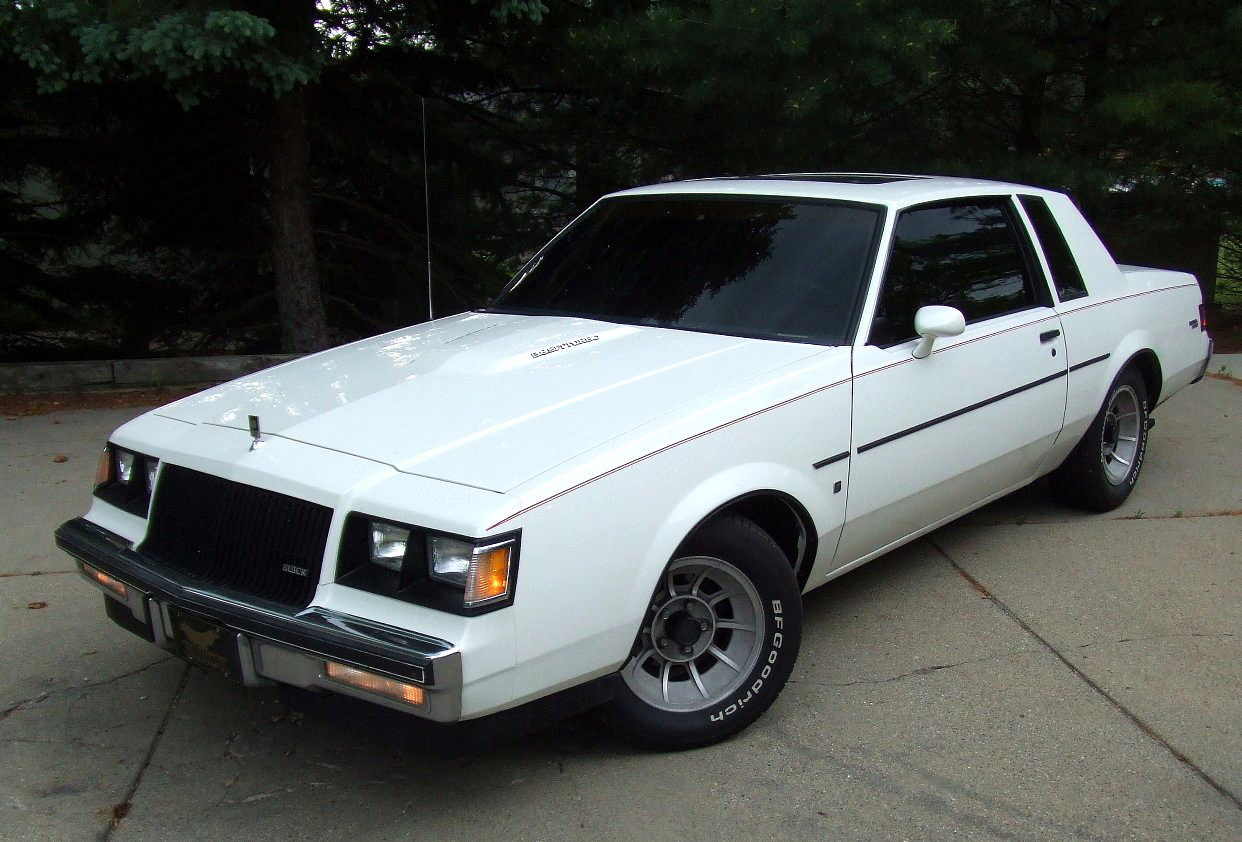
1987 Regal Turbo-T with rare blackout WO2 trim package

=== GNX ===
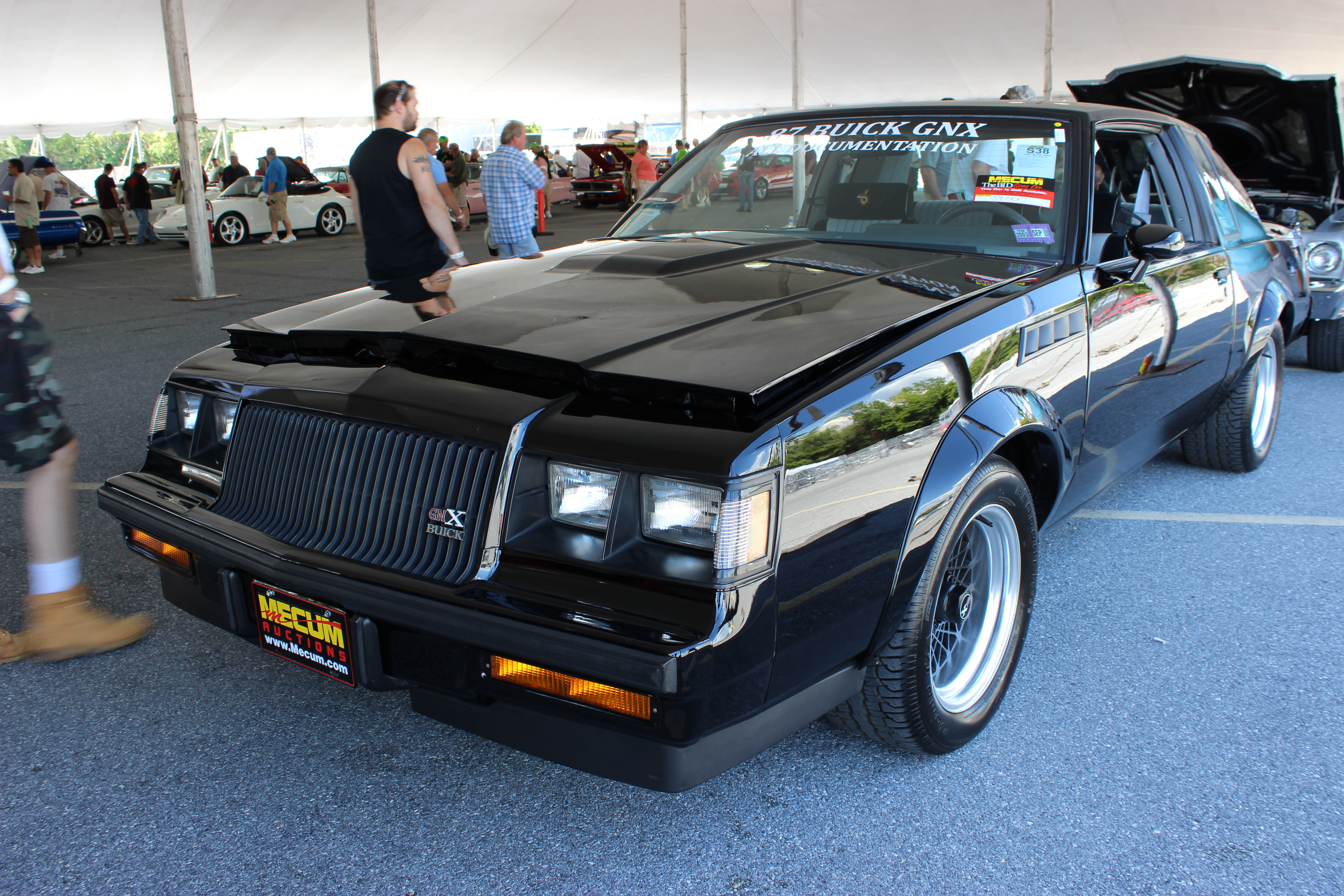
1987 Buick GNX

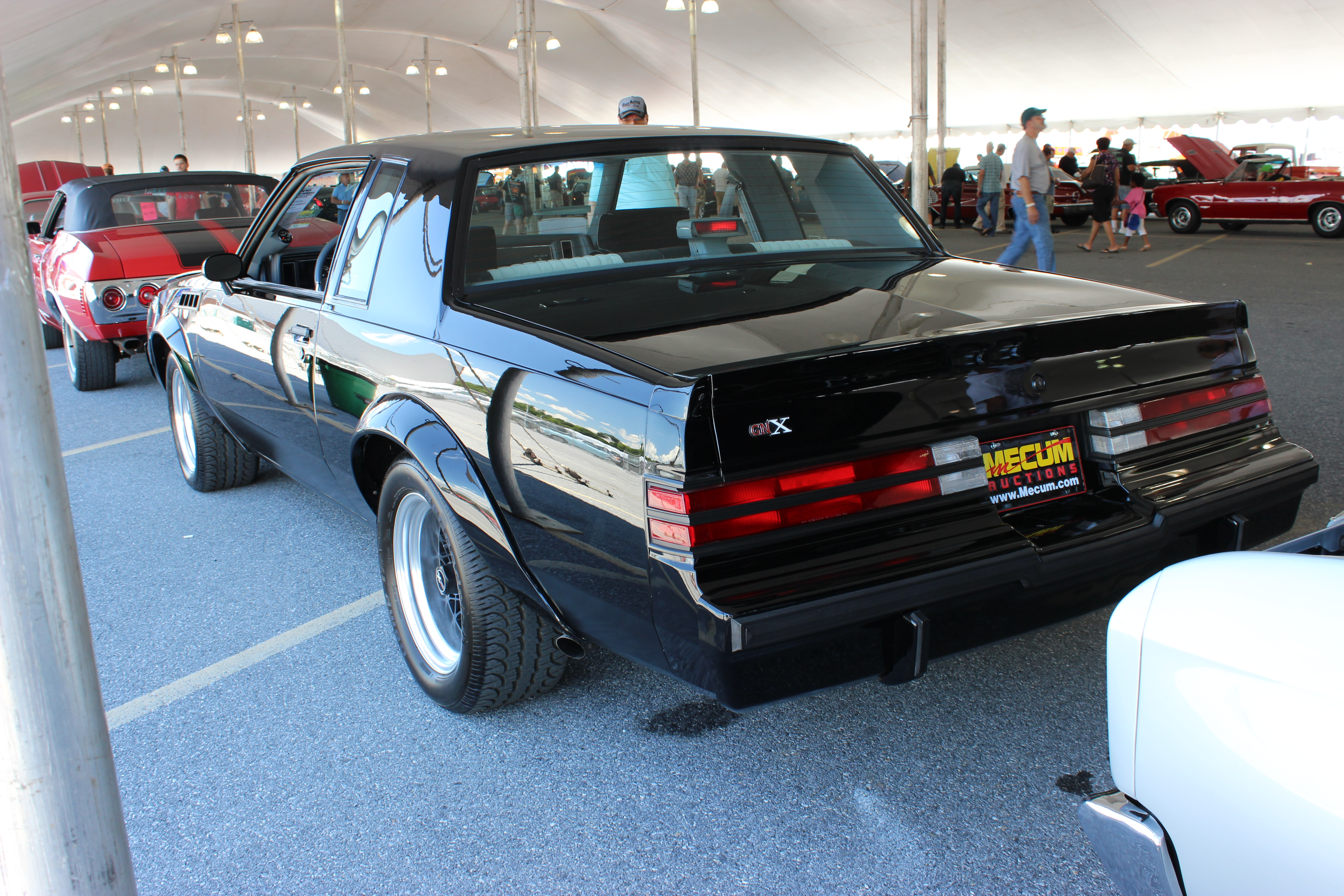
1987 Buick GNX rear

For the final year, 1987, Buick introduced the limited production GNX, for "Grand National Experimental", at US$29,900 (equivalent to $84,734 in 2025). Made in partnership with McLaren Performance Technologies/ASC, Buick produced only 547 GNs with the interior trim package, that were then sent off to McLaren and upgraded into the Buick GNX. Buick underrated the GNX at 276 hp (280 PS; 206 kW) at 4400 rpm and a very substantial 360 lb⋅ft (488 N⋅m) at 3000 rpm of torque, although actual output is 300 bhp (304 PS; 224 kW) and 420 lb⋅ft (569 N⋅m). This was created to be the "Grand National to end all Grand Nationals".

Changes made included a special Garrett AiResearch T-3 turbocharger with a ceramic-impeller blowing through a more efficient and significantly larger capacity intercooler with a "Cermatel (ceramic-aluminum) coated" pipe connecting the intercooler to the engine. A GNX-specific EPROM, low-restriction exhaust with dual mufflers, reprogrammed turbo Hydramatic 200-4R transmission with a custom torque converter and transmission cooler, a unique differential cover, and panhard rod included more of the performance modifications. Exterior styling changes include vents located on each front fender, 16 inch black mesh style wheels with VR-speed rated tires, and deletion of the hood and fender emblems. The interior changes of the GNX included a serial number on the dash plaque and a revised instrument cluster providing Stewart-Warner analog gauges, including an analog turbo boost gauge. The GNX used a unique torque arm that was mounted to a special, GNX only, rear differential cover, for increased traction. The torque arm rear suspension alters the suspension geometry, making the body lift while planting the rear tires down, resulting in increased traction. GNX #001 is the 1986 prototype currently owned by Buick and sometimes makes appearances at car shows around the US.

The stealthy appearance of the all-black GNX and Grand National (and the resemblance of its grille to his helmet's mouthpiece), coupled with the fact that the Grand National was initially released during the popularity of Star Wars movies, earned it the title "Darth Vader's Car.” Due to the turbocharged six-cylinder engine, the Buick make, and the black paint Grand Nationals were sometimes referred to as the "Dark Side". The "Dark Side" contrasted with the more common V8 Mustangs and Camaros that were popular at the time.

GNX is the title for hip-hop artist Kendrick Lamar's 2024 album and its eponymous 11th track, and the car is on the album's cover art.

== Third generation (1988) ==
Third generation
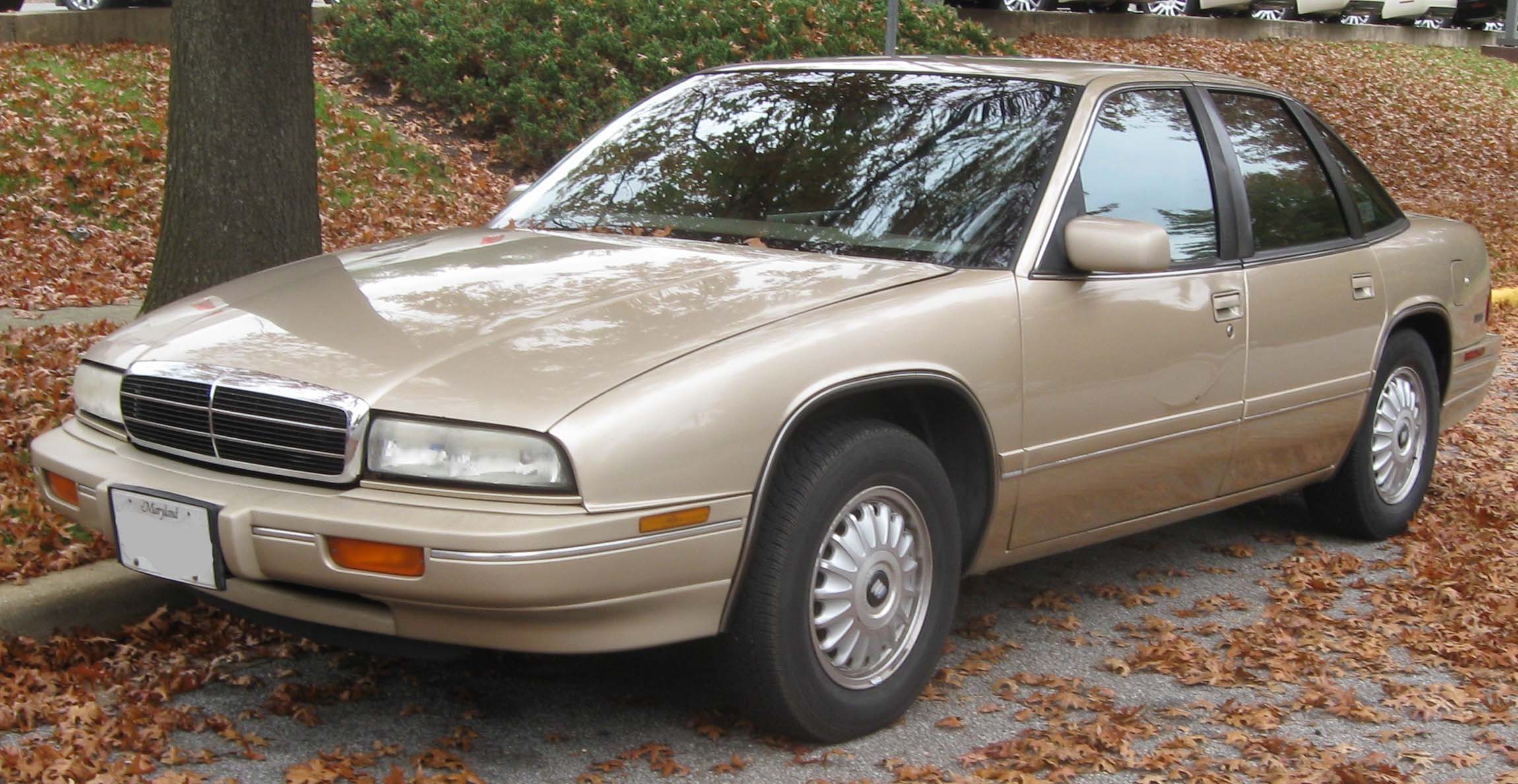
- 1993–1994 Regal sedan

Overview
- Production: 1987–October 1996
- Model years: 1988–1996
- Assembly: Canada: Oshawa (Oshawa Assembly)

Body and chassis
- Body style: 2-door coupe 4-door sedan
- Layout: FF layout
- Platform: W-body
- Related: Chevrolet Lumina; Oldsmobile Cutlass Supreme; Pontiac Grand Prix

Powertrain
- Engine: 2.8 L LB6 V6; 3.1 L LH0/L82 V6; 3.8 L L27/L36 V6
- Transmission: 4-speed automatic 1988–1992: 4T60; 1993–1996: 4T60-E

Dimensions
- Wheelbase: 107.5 in (2,730 mm)
- Length: 1988–89 2dr: 192.2 in (4,882 mm); 1990–91 2dr: 191.6 in (4,867 mm); 1992–94 2dr: 193.6 in (4,917 mm); 1995–96 2dr: 193.9 in (4,925 mm); 1990–91 4dr: 194.6 in (4,943 mm); 1992–94 Custom & GS 4dr: 194.8 in (4,948 mm); 1992–94 Limited 4dr: 196 in (4,978 mm); 1995 4dr: 193.7 in (4,920 mm); 1996 4dr: 194.1 in (4,930 mm)
- Width: 72.5 in (1,842 mm)
- Height: Sedan: 54.5 in (1,384 mm); Coupe: 53 in (1,346 mm)

A new Regal appeared in October 1987 on the GM W platform as the first vehicle on that platform; this generation ran with few changes for nine years. Though the new Regal returned to Buick's original concept in being offered only as a coupe and in being aimed once again squarely at the personal luxury buyer, it departed from tradition in being the first front-wheel-drive model, and in having no serious performance option or edition. Neither a V8 engine nor a turbocharged V6 was offered; the only engine available for 1988 was the Chevrolet 2.8 L V6, producing 125 hp (93 kW). From mid-1990, owing to the declining personal luxury car market, a four-door sedan version of the Regal was re-introduced (simultaneously as the Cutlass Supreme and Grand Prix, the latter offered as a sedan for the first time). However, sales of the new sedan were delayed until the 1991 model year. The four-door version was intended as a replacement for the A-body based Century, however, the popularity of that model meant that it would remain in production as a lower priced alternative to the Regal until both cars were redesigned for 1997. This generation saw the installation of Dynaride, which was an air compressor that would pressurize the rear Chapman Struts to maintain a level overall ride height. A badge was installed on the dashboard to the left of the steering column on all vehicles equipped. It was not available on vehicles equipped with Gran Touring Suspension, which instead used a stiffer setup with traditional hydraulic rear struts.

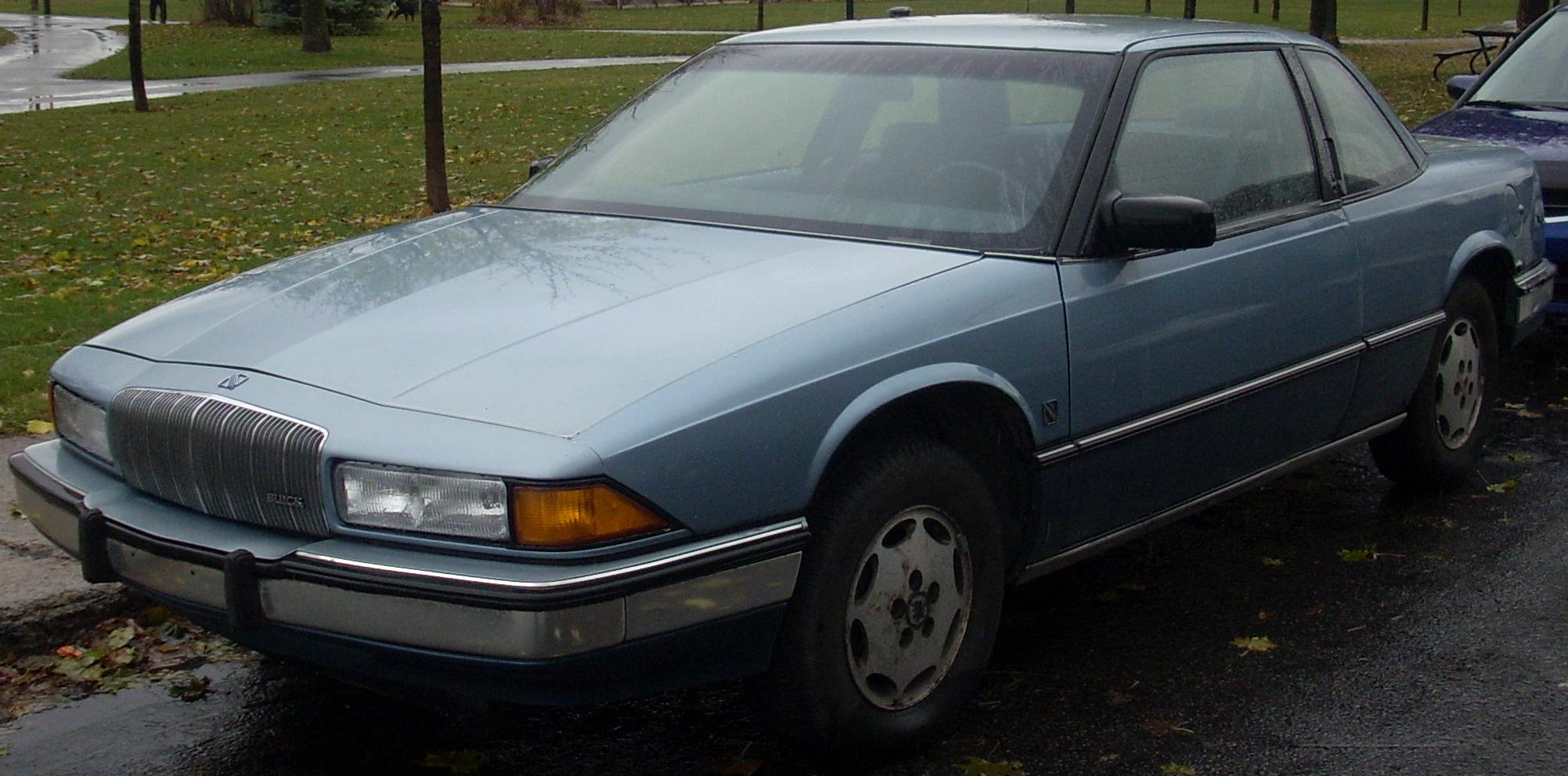
1988 Buick Regal Limited coupe

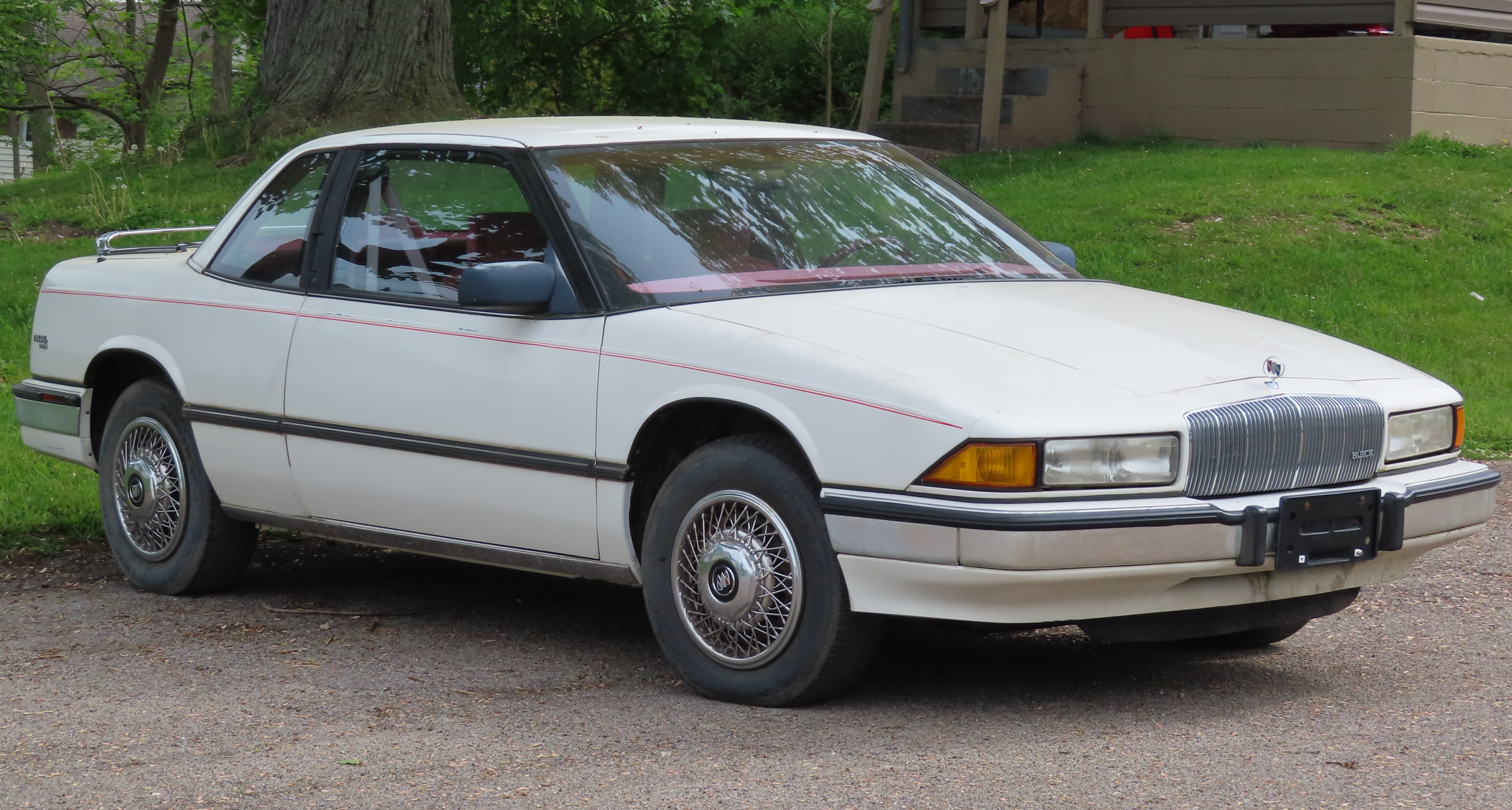
1990 Buick Regal Custom Coupe

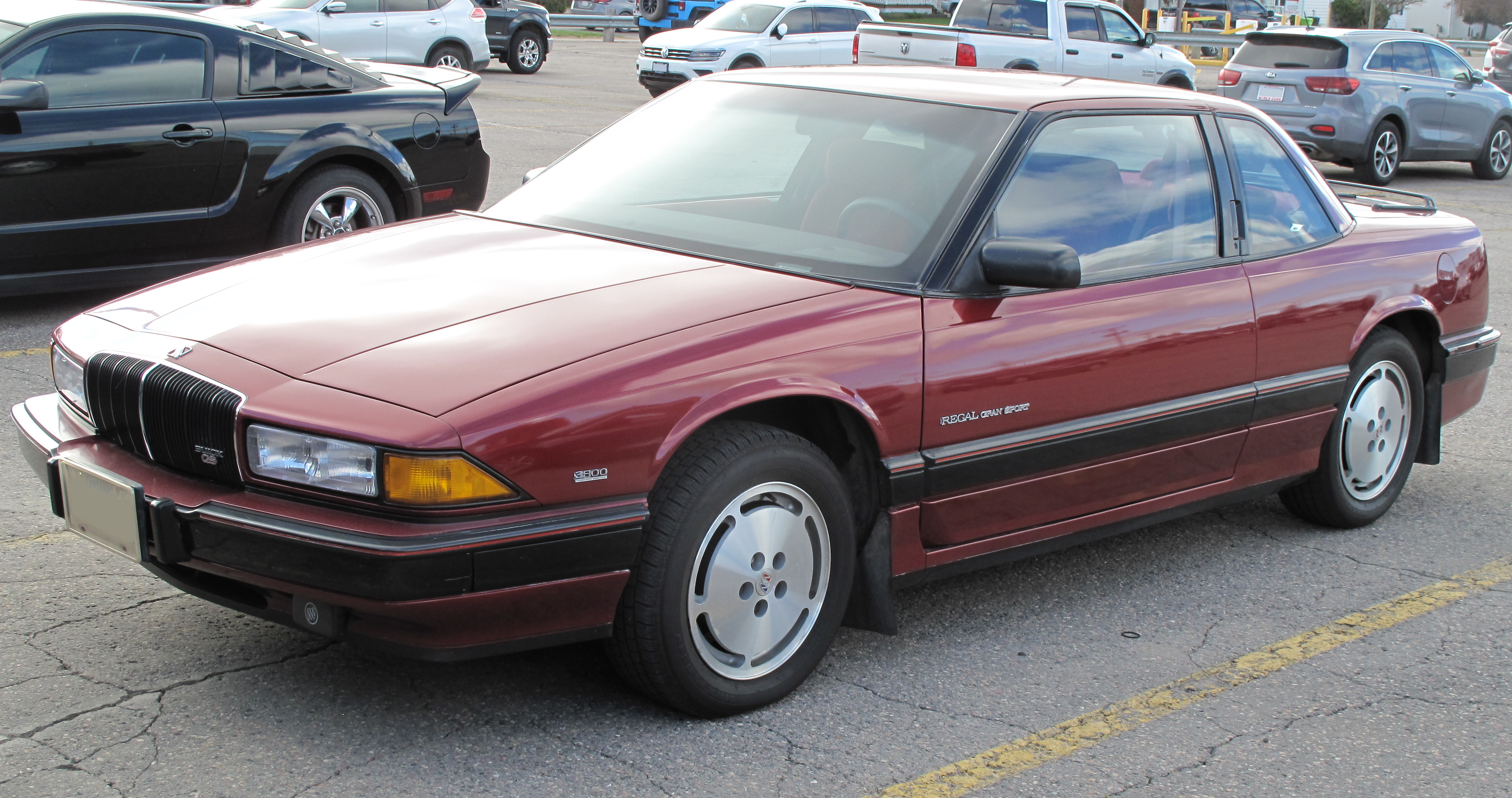
1990 Buick Regal Gran Sport coupe

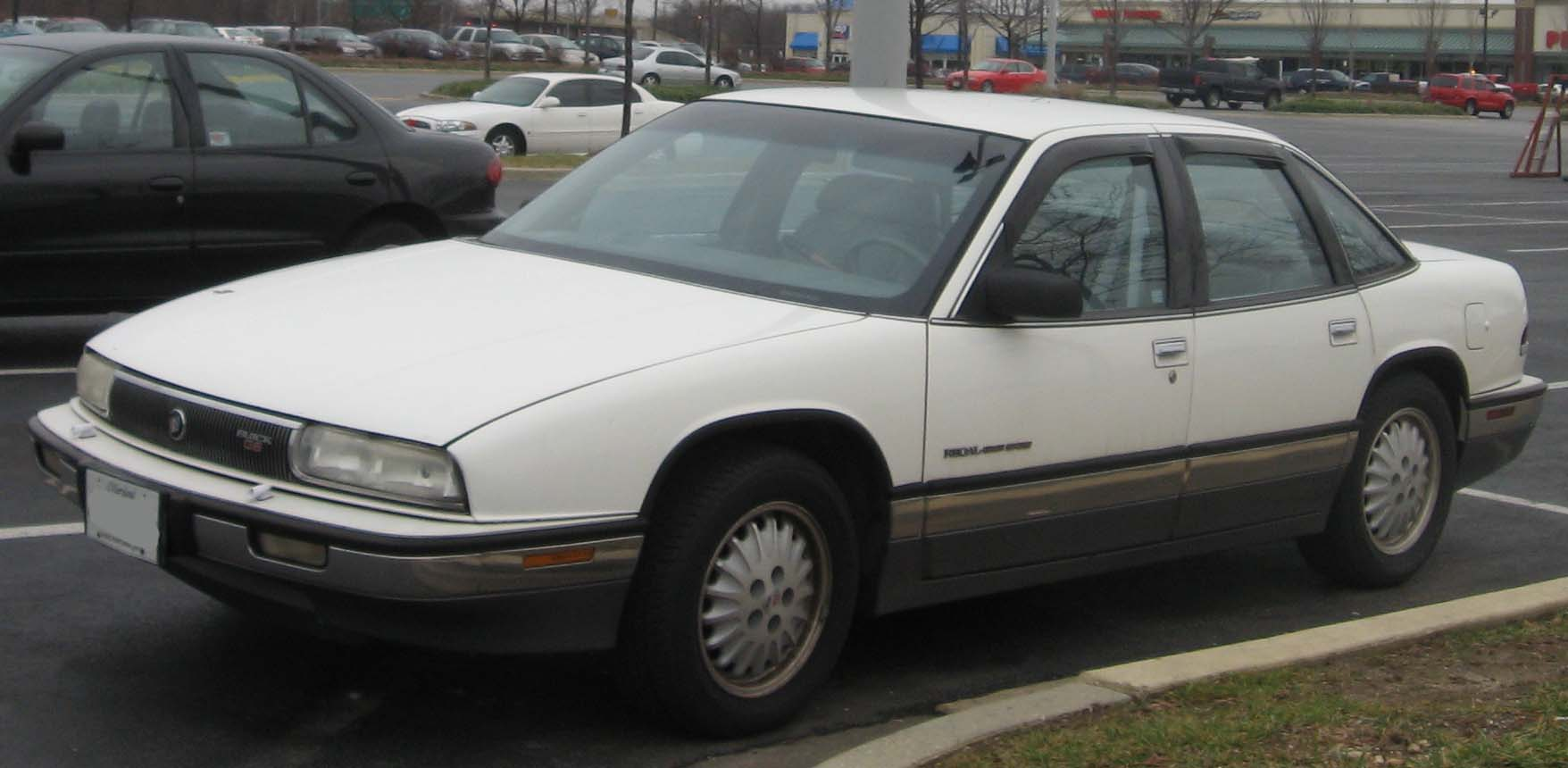
1991 Buick Regal Gran Sport sedan

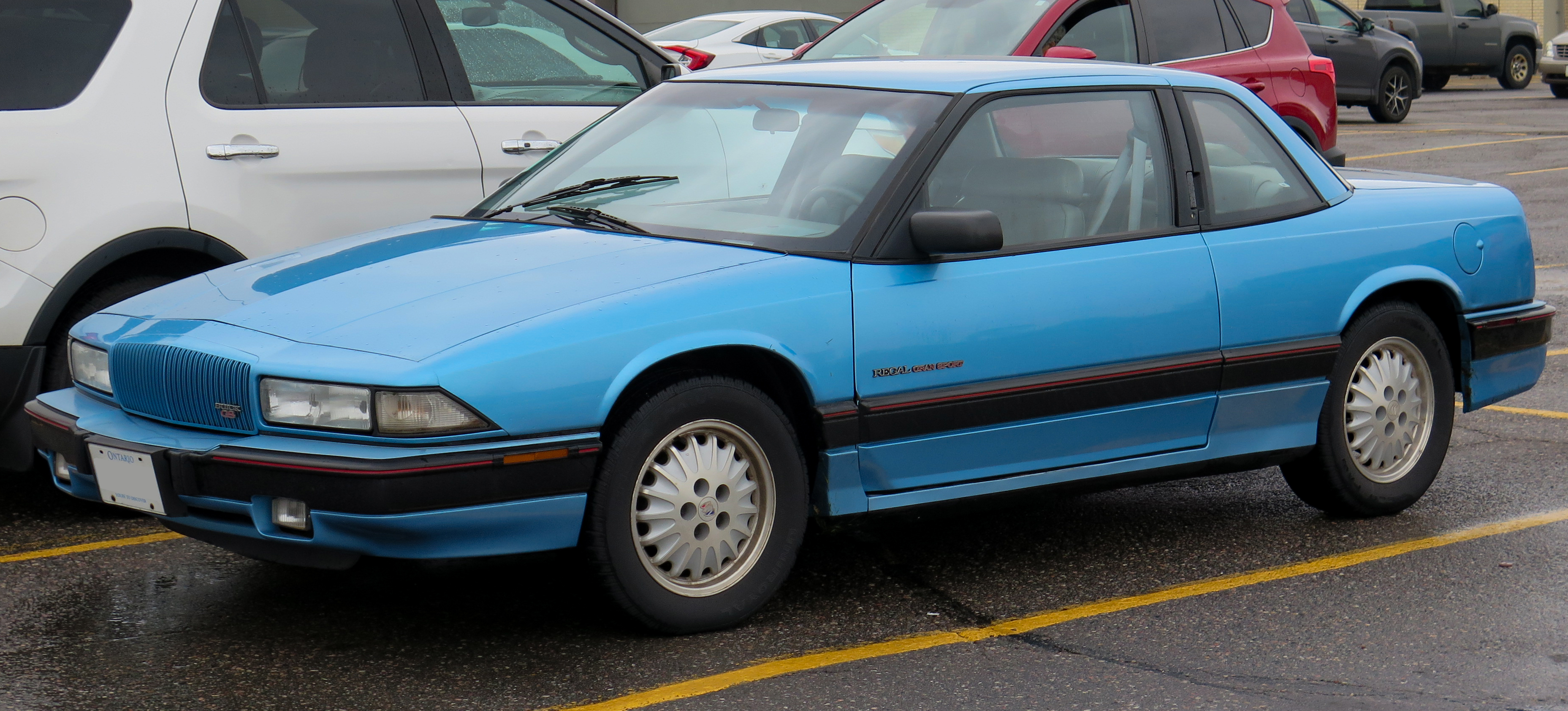
1992 Buick Regal Gran Sport coupe

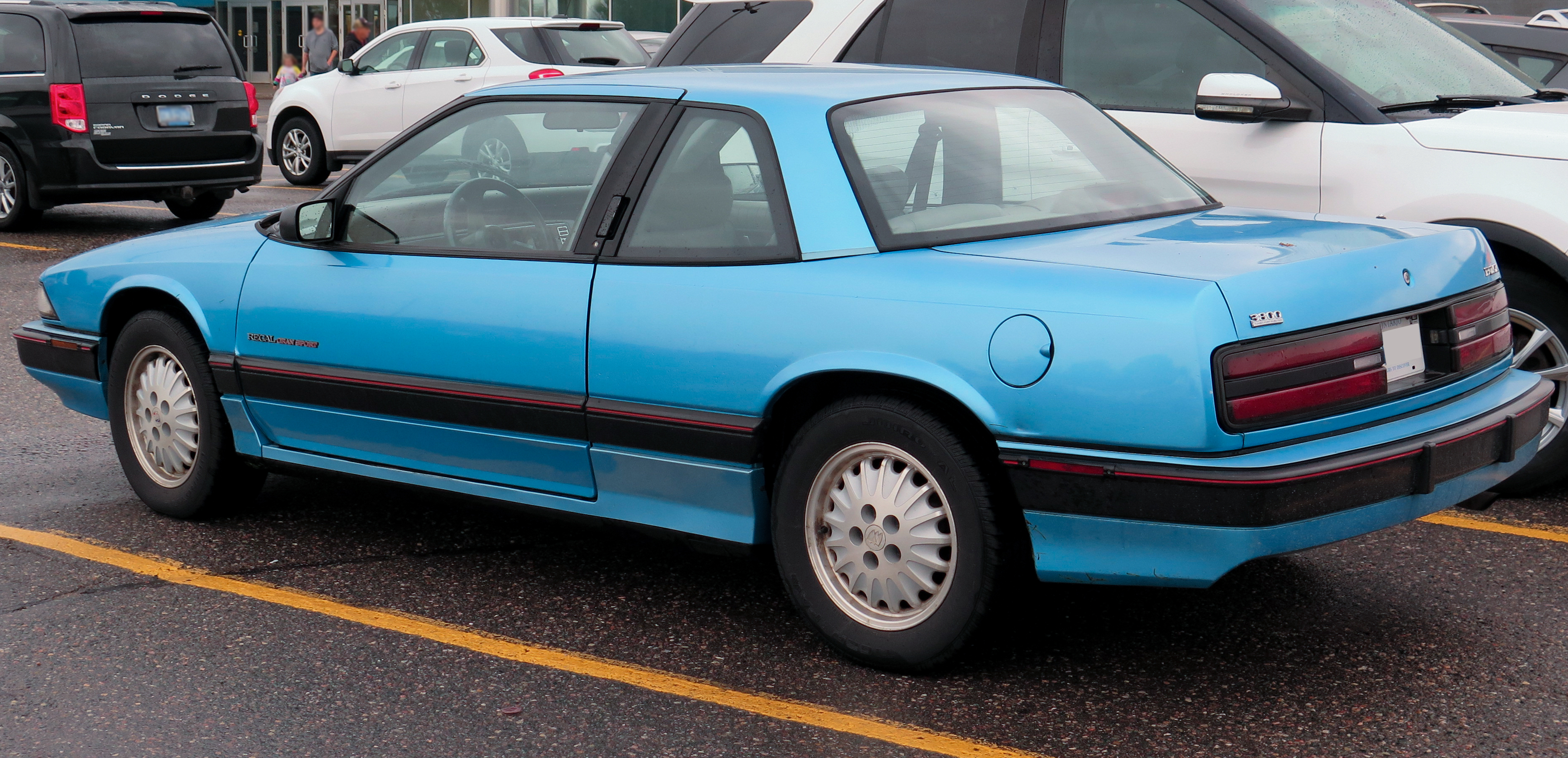
1992 Buick Regal Gran Sport coupe rear view

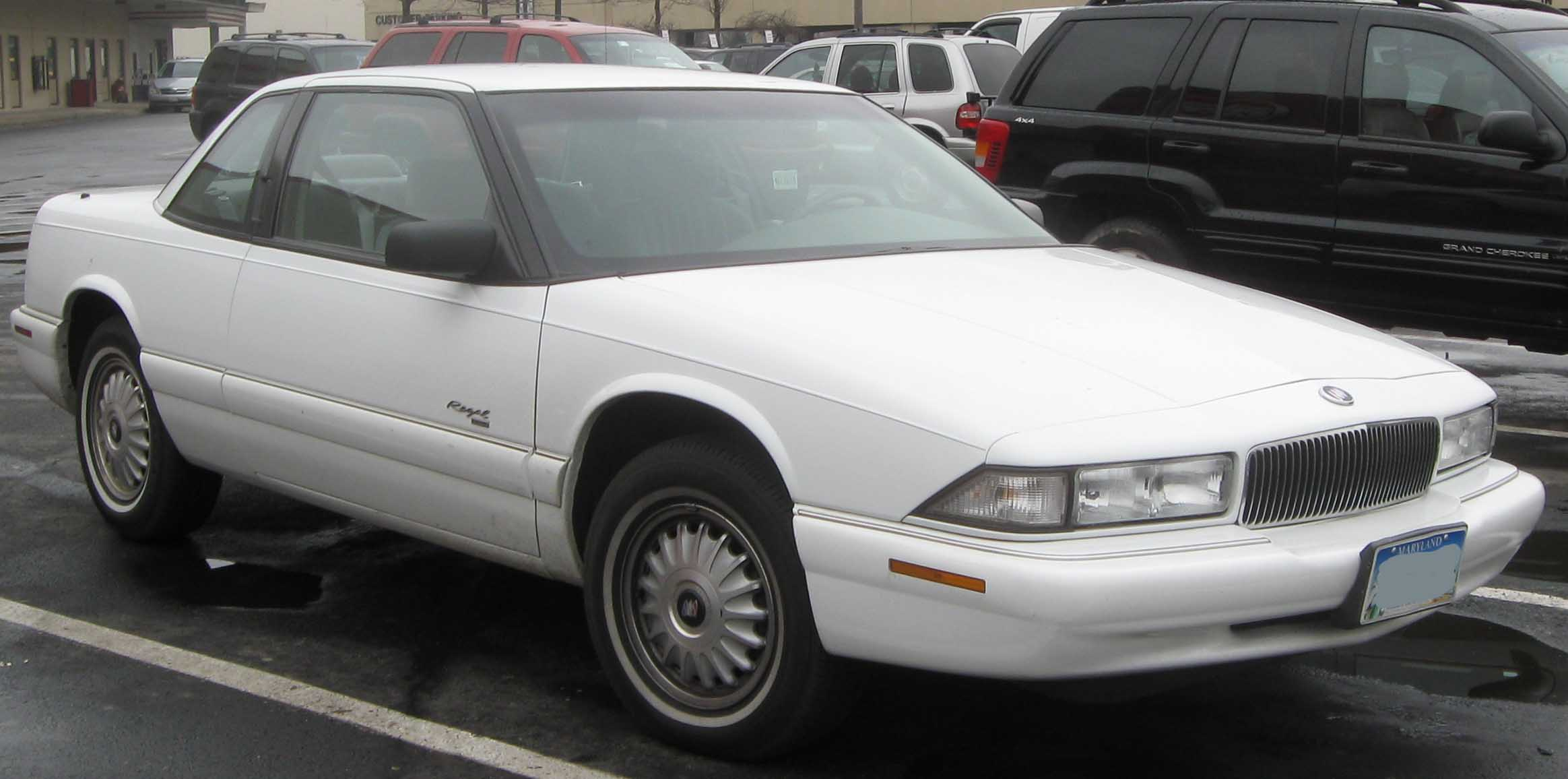
1995–1996 Buick Regal coupe

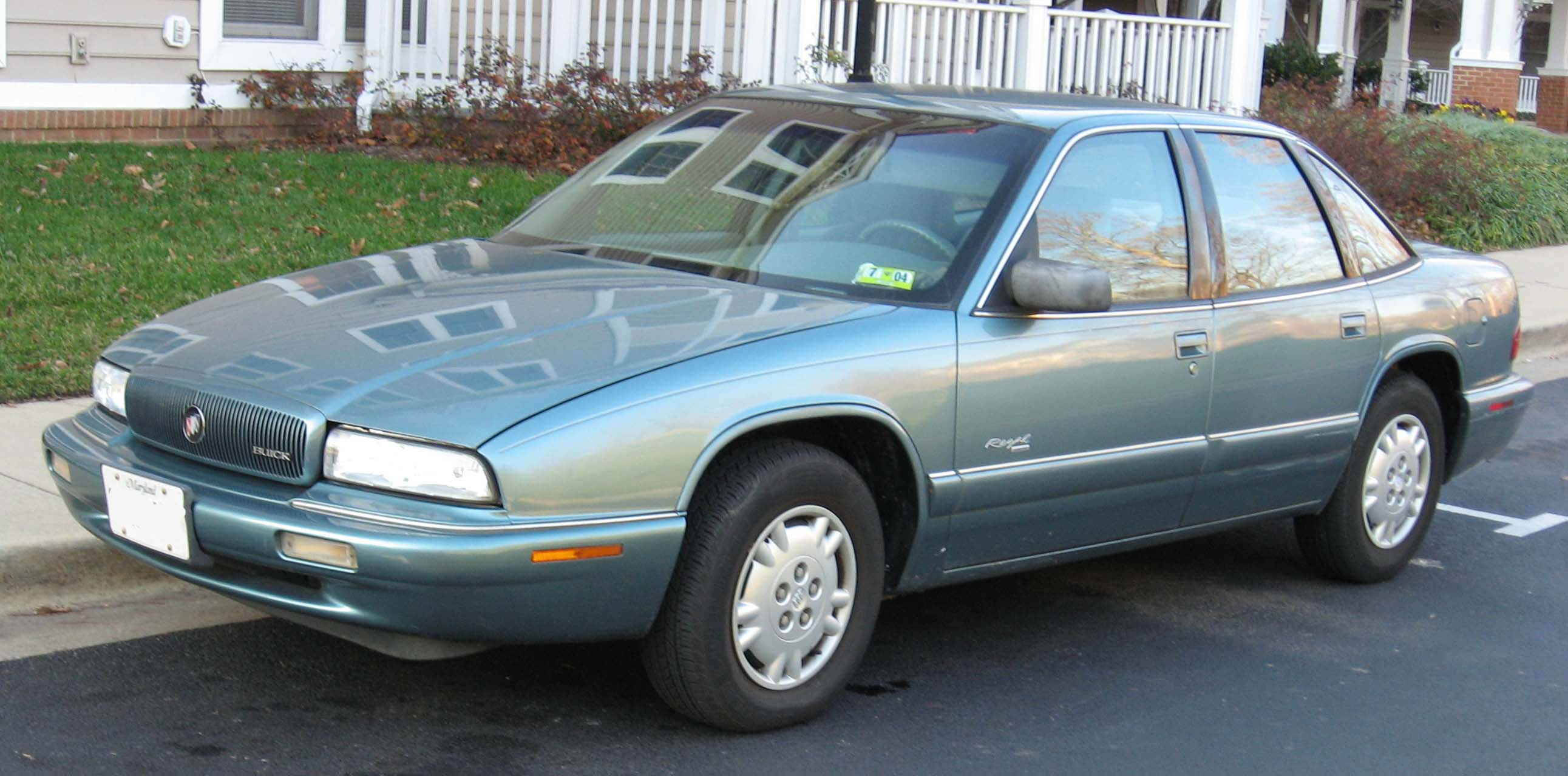
1996 Buick Regal sedan

=== Annual changes ===
The Regal was initially offered in base Custom and upscale Limited trim lines. For 1989, the Gran Sport trim line was added, featuring aluminum wheels, body side cladding and a console-mounted shifter attached to the 4-speed automatic. In mid-1990, the Regal gained the option of the Buick 3.8 L V6 with "Tuned-Port-Injection" (TPI). The 3800 V6 was unique to the Regal amongst the W-body cars, differentiating it from the mechanically similar Chevrolet Lumina, Oldsmobile Cutlass Supreme, and Pontiac Grand Prix. Anti-lock brakes were made standard on all but the base Custom cars from 1992.

For 1993, the Regal sedan received a minor facelift with a new hood and larger grille more reminiscent of the larger Buick models, as well as larger taillights. Along with this change came the introduction of an all new electronically controlled 4T60-E automatic transmission to replace the previous 4T60. For 1994, a driver's-side airbag was added, along with standard ABS on all models, standard power windows, and 20 hp (15 kW) more in the base engine due to a revised intake manifold and cylinder head. The Limited coupe was deleted; only the Custom and Gran Sport (GS) coupes remained.

For 1995, another facelift occurred with new smoothed out bumpers, taillights, and body cladding. The interior was completely redesigned to be more streamlined and ergonomically friendly with dual front airbags now standard, and the sedan's front seatbelts were relocated from the front doors to the B-pillars. For 1996, the larger 3.8 L; 231.3 cu in (3,791 cc) V6 engine became the 3800 Series II and bumped power to 205 hp (153 kW) and 230 lb⋅ft (310 N⋅m). All models were now modified to be OBD II compliant. A special "Olympic Gold" edition (also available on Skylark) was added to celebrate Buick's partnership with the 1996 Summer Olympics, complete with gold accents and traditional Olympic logos on the exterior and interior.

Production Figures

Buick Regal Production Figures
	Coupe	Sedan	Yearly Total
1988	129,997	-	129,997
1989	88,757	-	88,757
1990	57,822	-	57,822
1991	36,681	89,879	126,560
1992	21,153	76,561	97,714
1993	25,740	57,563	83,303
1994	18,068	60,489	78,557
1995	18,106	71,557	89,663
1996	5,991	107,056	113,047
Total	402,315	463,105	865,420

=== Engines ===
- 1988–1989 2.8 L (2,837 cc; 173.1 cu in) Chevrolet LB6 MFI V6, 125 hp (93 kW) and 160 lb⋅ft (217 N⋅m)
- 1989–1993 3.1 L (3,135 cc; 191.3 cu in) Chevrolet LH0 MFI V6, 140 hp (104 kW) and 180 lb⋅ft (244 N⋅m)
- 1994–1996 3.1 L (3,135 cc; 191.3 cu in) Chevrolet L82 SFI V6, 160 hp (119 kW) and 185 lb⋅ft (251 N⋅m)
- 1990–1995 3.8 L (3,791 cc; 231.3 cu in) Buick L27 V6, 170 hp (127 kW) and 220 lb⋅ft (298 N⋅m)
- 1996 3.8 L (3,791 cc; 231.3 cu in) Buick L36 V6, 205 hp (153 kW) and 230 lb⋅ft (310 N⋅m)

== Fourth generation (1997) ==
Fourth generation
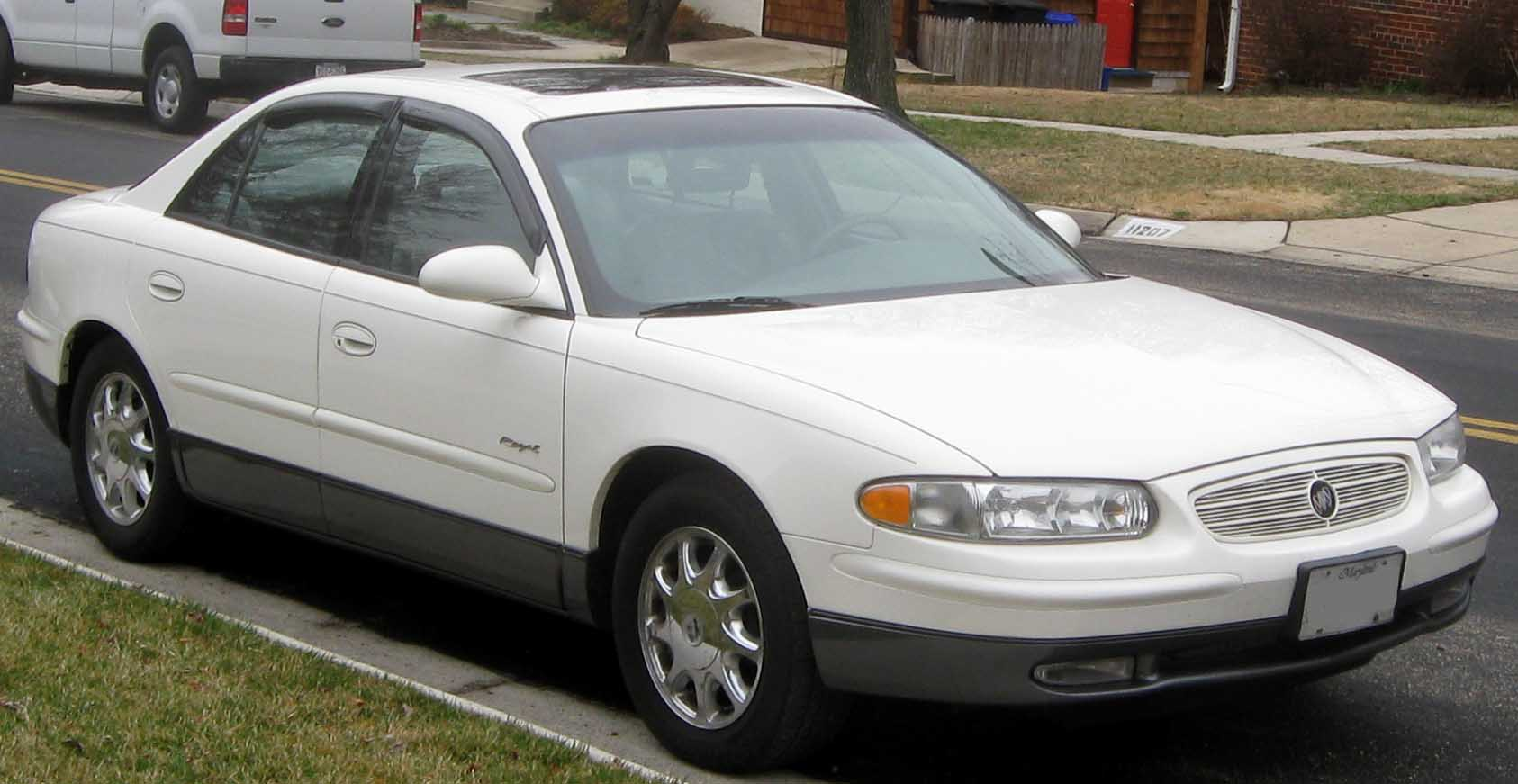
- Regal GSE (US)

Overview
- Also called: Chevrolet Lumina (Philippines)
- Production: North America: 1996–2004; China: 1999–2008
- Model years: North America: 1997–2004; China: 1999–2008; Philippines: 2005–2006
- Assembly: Canada: Oshawa (Oshawa Assembly); China: Shanghai (SAIC-GM)
- Designer: Wayne Cherry; Wayne Kady (1993); James C. Shyr (2003; exterior)

Body and chassis
- Body style: 4-door sedan
- Layout: FF layout
- Platform: W-body 2nd Gen
- Related: Buick Century; Chevrolet Impala; Chevrolet Monte Carlo; Oldsmobile Intrigue; Pontiac Grand Prix

Powertrain
- Engine: Gasoline: 2.0 L L34 I4 (China); 2.5 L LB8 V6 (China); 3.0 L LW9 V6 (China); 3.8 L 3800 Series II V6
- Transmission: 5-speed manual (China, 2.0 L only); 4-speed 4T60-E automatic 4-speed 4T65-E automatic 4-speed 4T65-E HD automatic

Dimensions
- Wheelbase: 109.0 in (2,769 mm)
- Length: 196.2 in (4,983 mm)
- Width: 72.7 in (1,847 mm)
- Height: 56.6 in (1,438 mm)

Chronology
- Successor: Buick LaCrosse

For the 1997 model year, the Century and Regal once again rode upon the same platform; the revised W platform that was shared with the Oldsmobile Intrigue, the Pontiac Grand Prix, the Chevrolet Lumina and Chevrolet Monte Carlo. The Regal coupe was discontinued.

Differences between the Regal and Century were mostly cosmetic. As the upmarket version, the Regal offered larger engines and fancier trim, and once again boasted a newer version of the 3.8 L V6. While the Century was mainly a reliable, economy-minded car based upon the W-body, the Regal was fitted with many amenities, including heated leather seats (optional on the Century), a Monsoon 8-speaker surround sound system, dual climate control, and expansive interior space. Few changes occurred during this version's seven-year run. It offered 5-passenger seating on all trim levels like the Pontiac Grand Prix and Oldsmobile Intrigue (formerly Cutlass Supreme), unlike their predecessors that had optional 6-passenger seating and the Buick Century (formerly built on the A platform) which had standard 6-passenger seating.

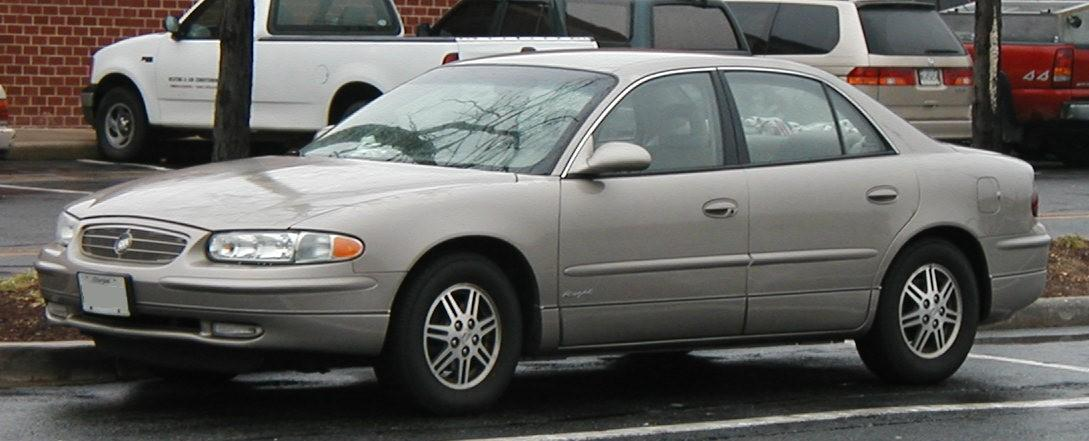
1997–2004 Buick Regal sedan

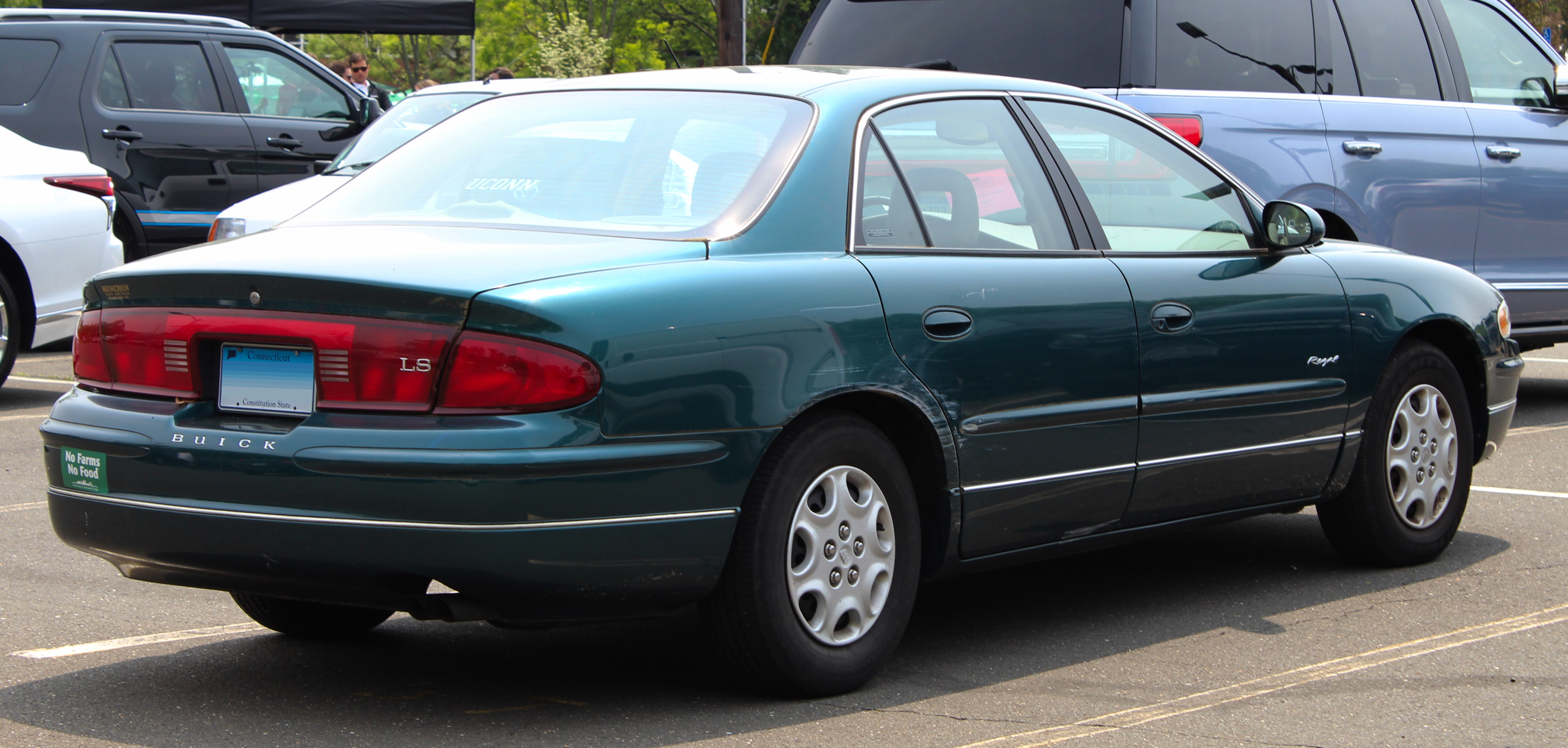
1999 Regal LS, Rear View

This period held the fastest Buick since the days of the 1987 GNX: the Buick Regal GS. This car was now supercharged instead of turbocharged, and produced 240 hp (179 kW) and 280 lb⋅ft (380 N⋅m) of torque. When introduced in January 1997, Buick advertised the Regal GS as "The official car of the supercharged family". Buick also released two other model types, the LSE and the GSE. The LSE stayed with the 200 hp (149 kW) engine with upgrades and the GSE stayed with the 240 hp (179 kW) supercharged engine with upgrades. Also, in 2000 Buick came out with a concept GSX that had an intercooled 3.8 L, but was supercharged rather than turbocharged. It had 295.24 hp (220.16 kW).

From 2001 to 2004 Buick offered a Joseph Abboud appearance package on both the GS and LS models. This package included either a solid taupe or two-tone taupe/chestnut leather seats, two-tone leather-wrapped steering wheel, leather shifter handle and boot, 16-inch aluminum wheels; and Joseph Abboud signature emblems on the front doors, floor mats, front-seat headrests, and taillights.

The North American Regal was replaced in 2005 by the Buick LaCrosse, also built on the W platform. The final 2004 Buick Regal rolled off the assembly line on June 1, 2004.

=== Engines ===
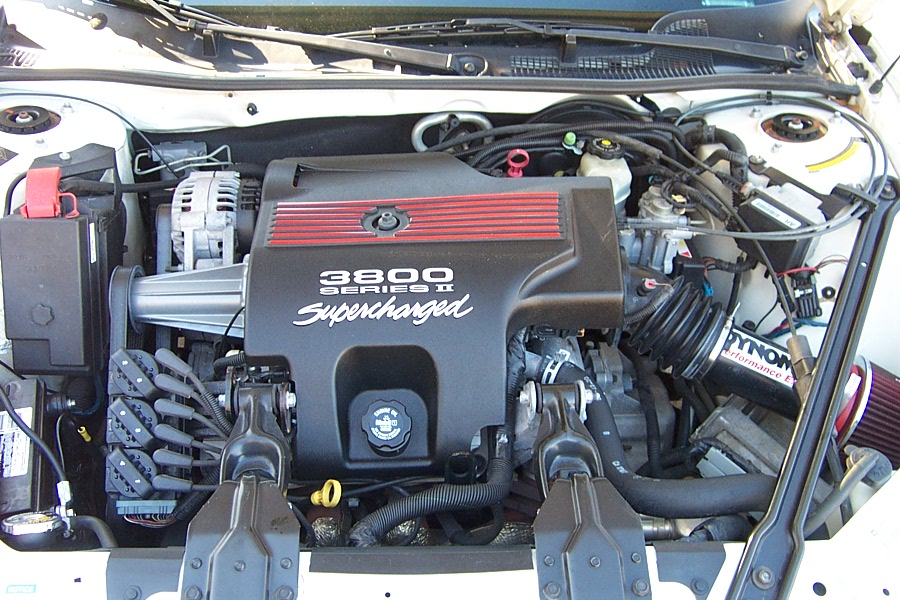
The 3800 Series II L67 Supercharged engine in a 1998 GS

- 1997–2004 3.8 L L36 Series II V6
- 1997–2004 3.8 L L67 Series II supercharged V6

The Regal LS from the factory had a 1/4 mile (≈400 m) elapsed time (ET) of 15.8 seconds and could do 0-60 mph in under 8 seconds. The supercharged Regal GS had a 1/4 mile ET of 14.9 seconds, and acceleration to 60 mph (97 km/h) took 6.7 seconds. The Regal GS, equipped with the supercharged 3.8 liter V6 engine (L67) produced 240 hp (179 kW) & 280 lb⋅ft (380 N⋅m) of torque. The Regal LS was EPA rated at 19/30 MPG city/freeway while the supercharged Regal GS was EPA rated at 18/27 MPG city/freeway.

=== Regal LSX and GSX (SLP Performance) ===
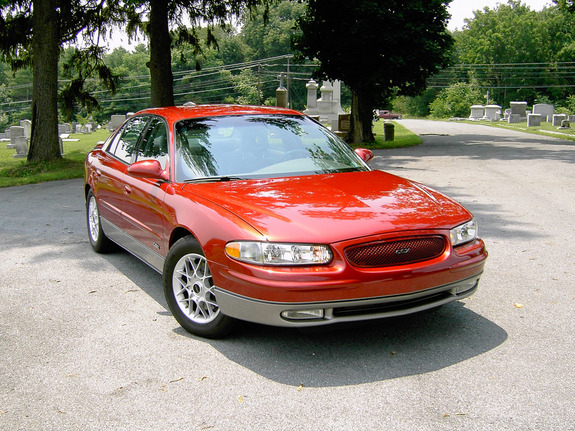
Buick Regal GSX

In the 2003 and 2004 model years, Buick officially offered — in collaboration with Troy, Michigan based tuners, Street Legal Performance, aka SLP Performance — the Buick Regal GSX, with dealer-supplied and installed options for both LS and GS models. The SLP GSX offered three packages, marketed as stages. The Stage 1 package added 10 horsepower with the addition of a dual stainless steel cat-back exhaust system and free-flowing cold air induction system. The Stage 2 package added a Hypertech Power Programmer with an SLP custom calibration — good for an extra 20 horsepower on top of the Stage 1 package. The Stage 3 package added a 3.5-inch smaller diameter supercharger pulley to increase the boost. With an advertised 30 more horsepower than stock, the Stage 3 GSX was conservatively rated at 270 hp (201 kW) and 312 lb⋅ft (423 N⋅m) of torque.

As GSX parts remained directly available from SLP for many years, Regal GS sedan owners could have their cars independently customized to GSX appearance and performance by SLP dealers, including for Regal GS models from 1997 to 2004. An authentic Buick GSX can be verified from an SLP door jamb label with the correct part number for the kit.

=== China ===
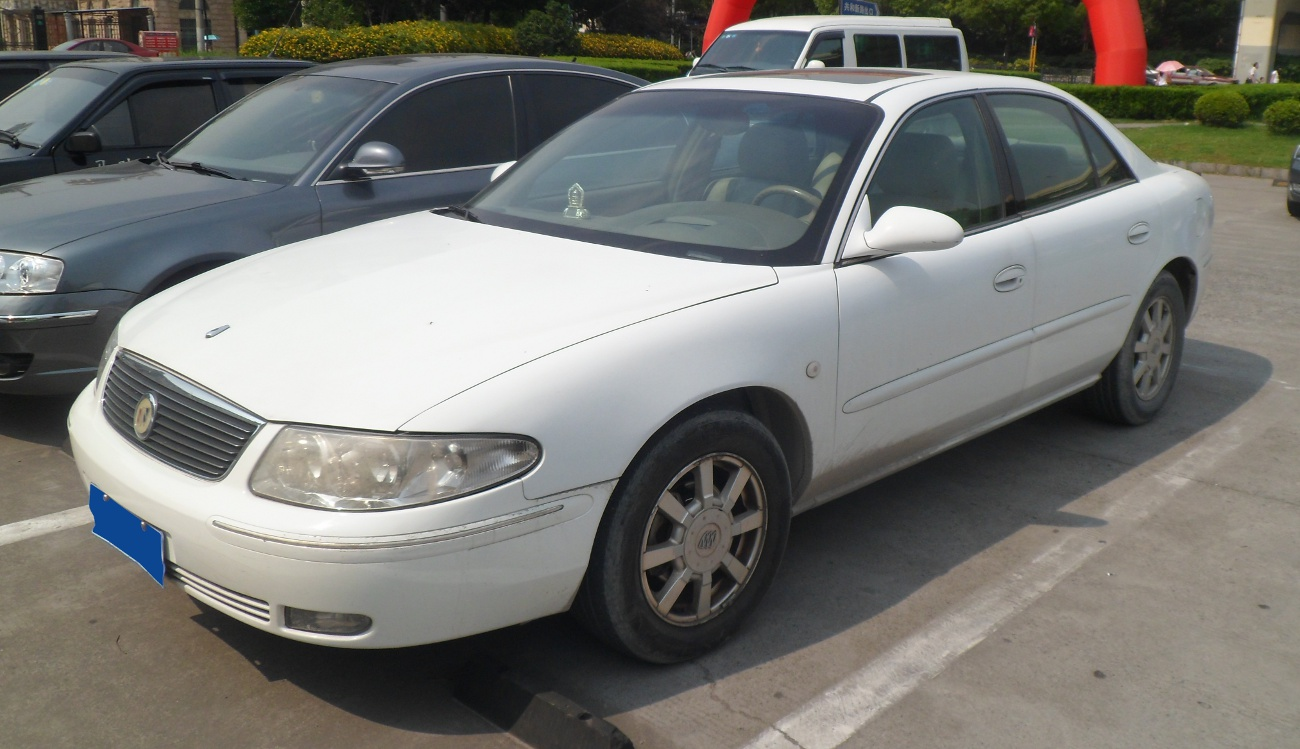
1999–2008 Buick Regal front quarter (China)

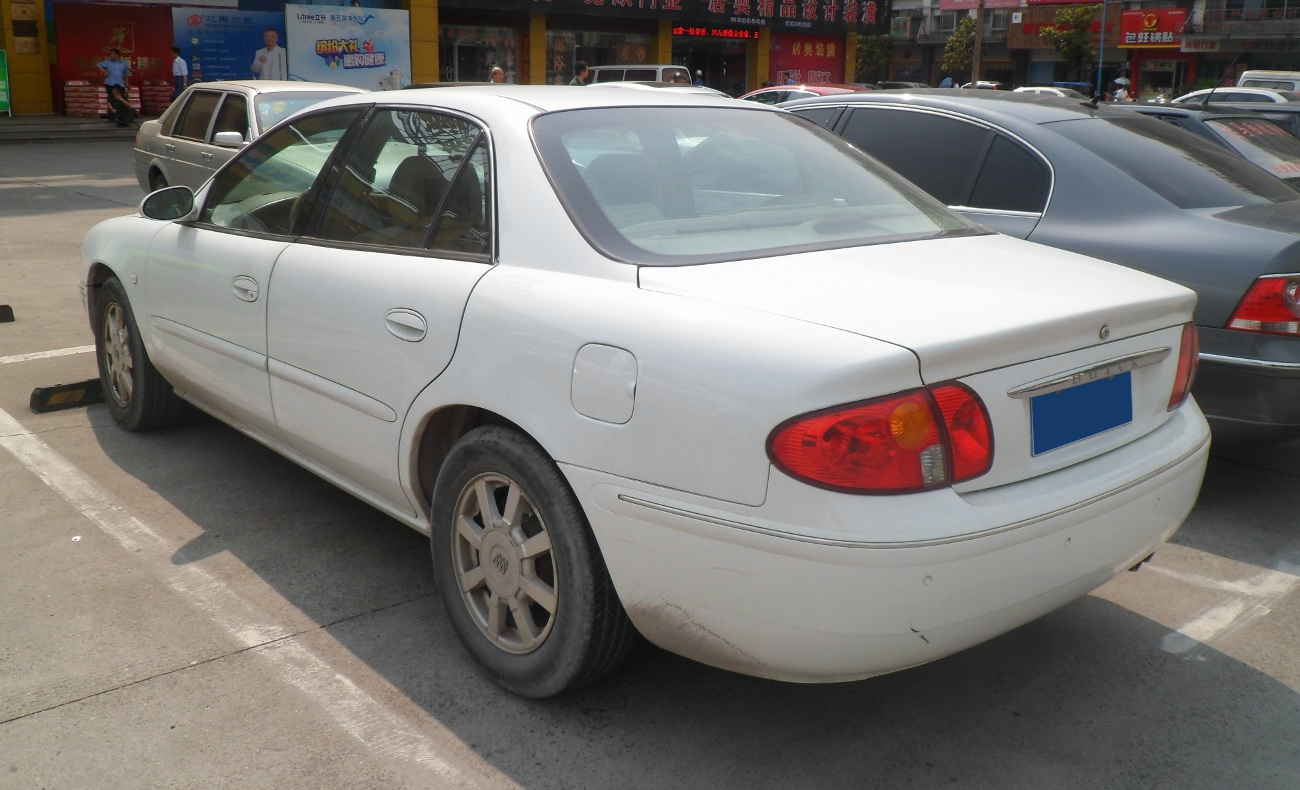
1999–2008 Buick Regal rear quarter (China)

General Motors and Shanghai Automotive Industry Corporation (SAIC) established a joint venture in 1997 called Shanghai GM, and had begun assembling the Buick Regal in Shanghai, China in April 1999.

The Regal has sold well in the Chinese market as a large, relatively luxurious model, despite its high price, costing more than the North American version. The Chinese market Regal has different front- and rear-end styling compared to the North American version and different engines, including the 2.0 L L34, the 2.5 L LB8 V6 and the 3.0 L LW9 V6. Gearbox choices were a 4-speed automatic for V6 models, while four-cylinder variants are paired with an exclusive 5-speed manual gearbox. V6 models had a set of black dashboard gauges, while the four-cylinder models had white dashboard gauges. These models also had slightly different names: the entry-level model was the New Century, with more upscale models carrying the GL and GLX names. Later, G and GS models were added. Production for this generation ended in November 2008 in China being replaced by the Opel Insignia-based Regal.

The Chinese-built Regal was also sold in the Philippines from 2005 to 2006 as the Chevrolet Lumina, where it replaced the Opel Vectra. The 2.5 V6 was the only engine option. The Chevrolet Lumina was discontinued from the Filipino market in 2006, leaving GM again without a mid-size sedan until the introduction of the eighth generation Chevrolet Malibu in 2013.

== Fifth generation (2008) ==
Fifth generation
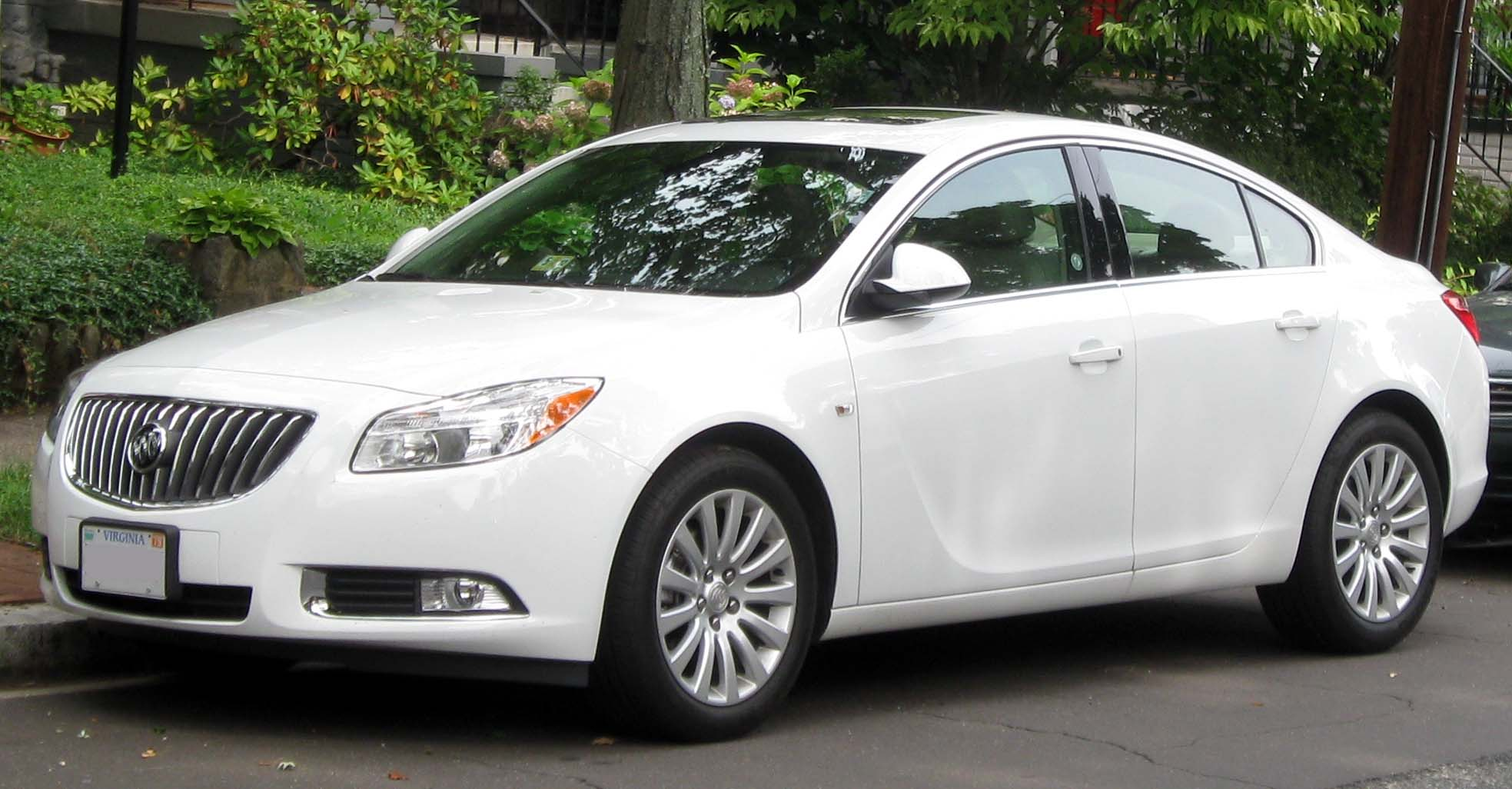
- 2011 Buick Regal CXL

Overview
- Also called: Opel Insignia; Vauxhall Insignia; Chevrolet Vectra; Holden Insignia
- Production: 2008–2017
- Model years: China: 2009–2017; North America: 2011–2017
- Assembly: Canada: Oshawa (Oshawa Assembly, 2011–2017); China: Shanghai (SAIC-GM); Germany: Rüsselsheim (Opel)
- Designer: Mark Adams (2006); Malcolm Ward (2006); James C. Shyr (2009, 2010; exterior)

Body and chassis
- Body style: 4-door sedan
- Layout: FF layout / F4 layout
- Platform: GM Epsilon II SWB/GMX350
- Related: Buick LaCrosse; Chevrolet Malibu; Cadillac XTS; Saab 9-5

Powertrain
- Engine: Gasoline: 1.6 L LLU turbo I4 (China); 2.0 L LTD I4 (China); 2.0 L LDK/LHU/LTG turbo I4; 2.4 L LE5/LAF/LEA/LUK I4
- Transmission: 6-speed Hydra-Matic 6T40 automatic; 6-speed Hydra-Matic 6T50 automatic; 6-speed Hydra-Matic 6T70 automatic; 6-speed Aisin AF40 automatic; 6-speed Aisin F40 manual

Dimensions
- Wheelbase: 107.8 in (2,738 mm)
- Length: 190.2 in (4,831 mm)
- Width: 73.1 in (1,857 mm)
- Height: 58.4 in (1,483 mm)
- Curb weight: 3,600 lb (1,600 kg) (2011 CXL); 3,671 lb (1,665 kg) (2011 CXL Turbo)

Chronology
- Predecessor: Buick LaCrosse

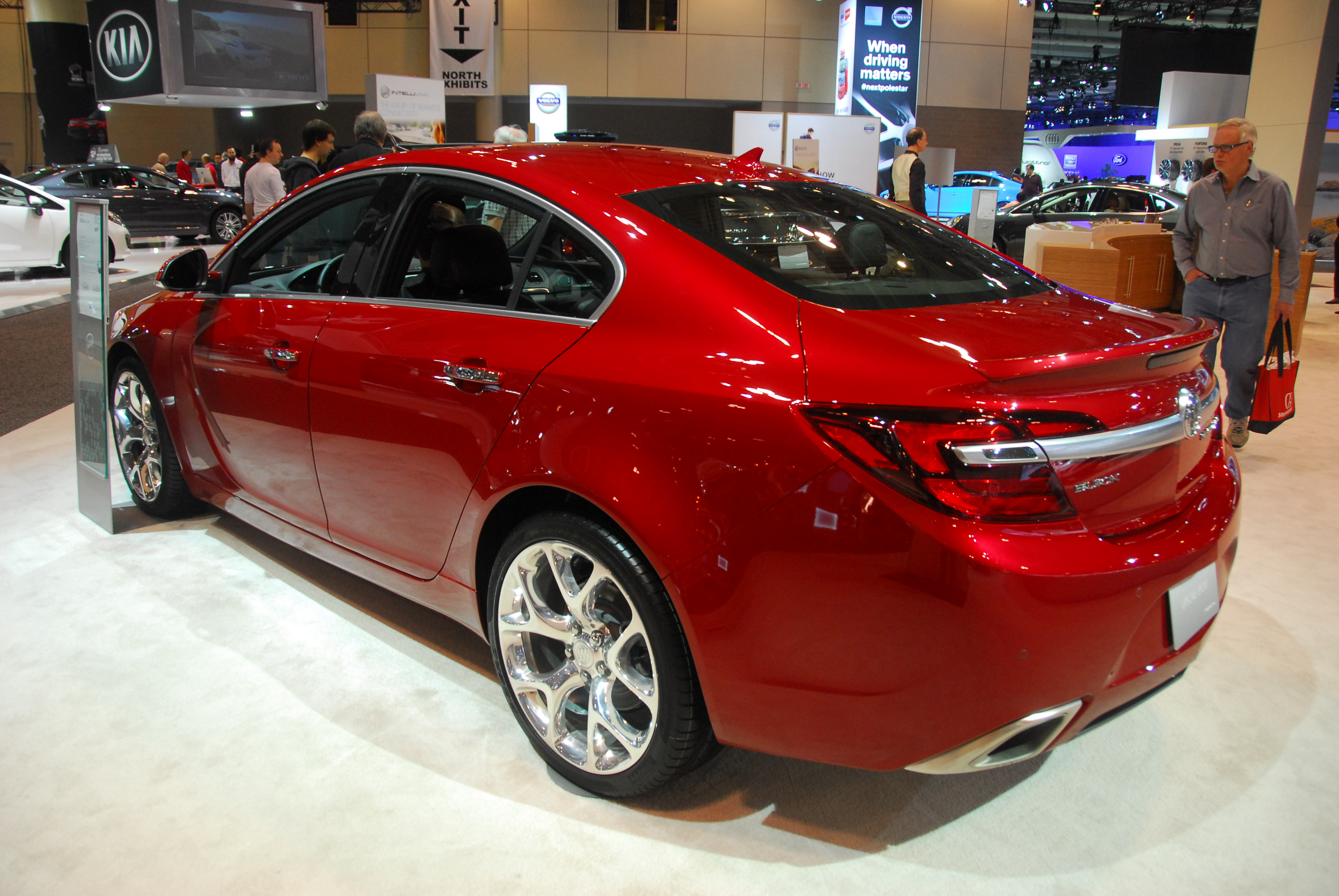
Buick Regal

The fifth-generation Buick Regal is a four-door, five-passenger, midsized sedan with a front engine, front-wheel drive layout. According to GM published information, more than 41 percent of Regal buyers in the US came from non-General Motors brands, and more than 60 percent of CXL Turbo buyers were under the age of 55.

=== Development ===
The fifth generation Buick Regal rides on GM's Epsilon II platform and is mostly identical to the Opel Insignia. It first went into production in Rüsselsheim, Germany, in 2008. The Shanghai GM twin of the Insignia was introduced in China as Buick Regal in December, 2008 for the 2009 model year.

GM originally planned to sell a modified version of the Opel Insignia in North America as the second generation Saturn Aura, but changed strategy after deciding to discontinue the Saturn brand. The Regal utilizes unibody construction with galvanized steel front fenders, hood, roof and door panels and thermoplastic polyolefin (TPO) bumper covers. The North American Regal weighs about 13 lb (6 kg) more than an equivalent Opel Insignia due to increased structural support in the B-pillar necessary to meet U.S. rollover standards.

Buick's product manager director Roger McCormack stated in a 2010 consumer webchat that a coupé version was under heavy consideration, as well as the possibility for further body styles such as a convertible. A Buick-badged Insignia Sports Tourer was also spied, but the following year a Buick spokesperson declared that there were no plans to sell a Regal wagon.

=== Marketing ===
GM presented the fifth-generation Regal to North American dealers on October 14, 2009, and introduced the Regal to the public in November 2009 at the LA Auto Show. Sales of the Regal began in February 2010. In North America, the Regal is positioned below the larger, more expensive LaCrosse and above the Verano compact sedan which debuted late in the 2011 calendar year.

=== Production ===
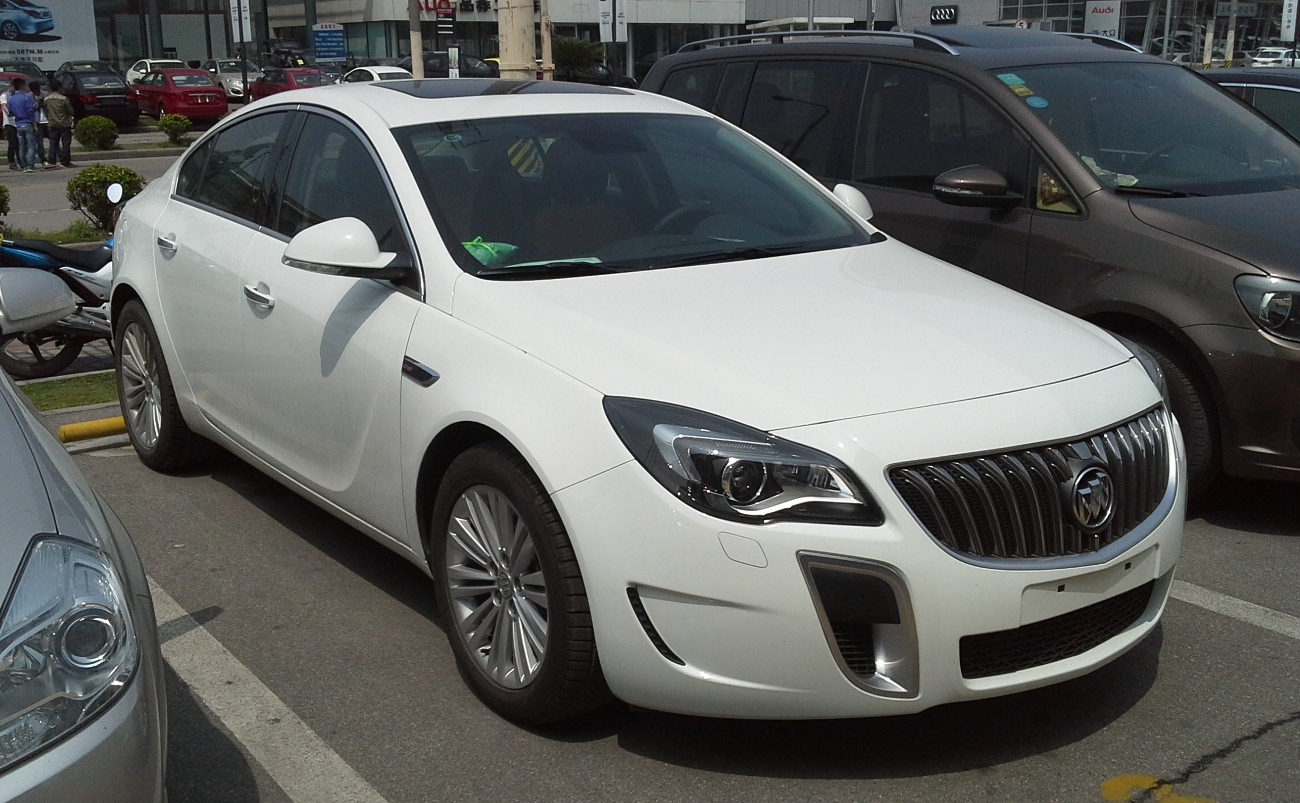
Buick Regal (China - facelift)

Production of the Shanghai GM variant of the Regal began in November 2008 and ended in July 2017. North American production at General Motors of Canada's Oshawa, Ontario, assembly plant was confirmed on November 25, 2009, and production began at Oshawa Car Assembly in February 2011. The initial production for the North American market was done together with its Opel twin the Opel Insignia in the Adam Opel AG's Rüsselsheim, Germany assembly plant from March 1, 2010, to March 25, 2011 (33,669 cars in 2010 and 12,637 in 2011).

=== Trim levels ===
==== CXL ====
The Regal debuted in North America with a 2.4L DOHC I4 engine rated at 182 hp (136 kW) and 172 lb⋅ft (233 N⋅m) of torque, using a Hydra-Matic 6T45 six-speed automatic transmission.

The 2011 Regal manufactured in North America was offered in a single trim level, marketed as CXL, offered with two engine choices and seven option packages. Buick had planned to offer a lower-level trim called CX with cloth seats and a higher level trim called CXS, but those trim levels were not offered.

==== CXL Turbo ====
The CXL Turbo comes equipped with a turbocharged 2.0L direct-injected Ecotec DOHC I4 rated at 220 hp (164 kW) and 258 lb⋅ft (350 N⋅m) of torque, mated to either an Aisin AF40 6-speed automatic or a 6-speed manual transmission, making the Regal Turbo the first Buick model to be offered with a manual transmission since the Buick Skyhawk ended production in 1989. The 2.0L turbo is the first direct-injected turbocharged production car capable of running on any blend of gasoline or E85 ethanol.

==== GS ====
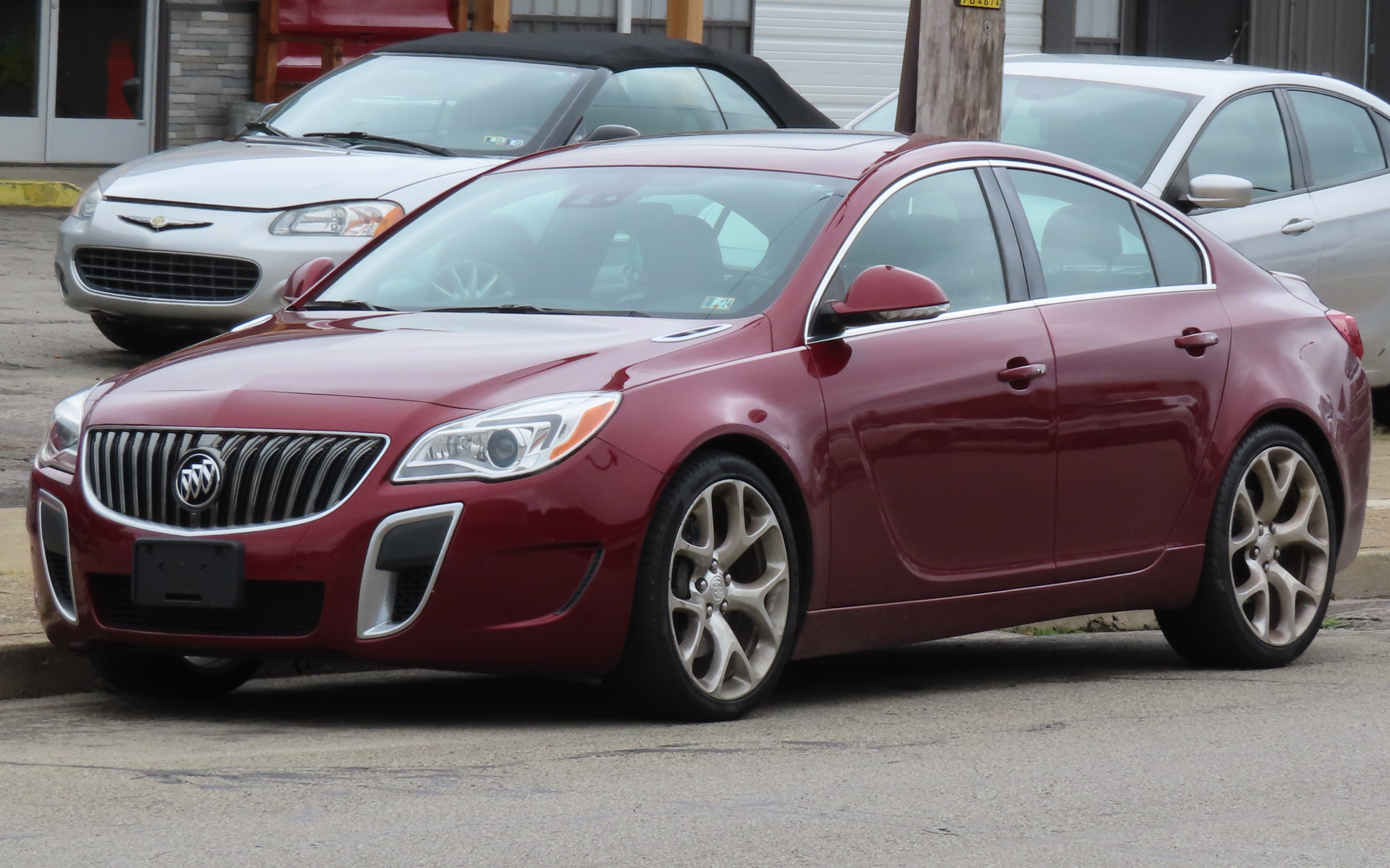
2016 Buick Regal GS

At the 2010 North American International Auto Show in Detroit, GM showed a concept GS version of the Regal based on the Opel Insignia OPC and the Vauxhall Insignia VXR. The concept featured a 2.0L, 270 hp (201 kW), 295 lb⋅ft (400 N⋅m) high-output DOHC I4 turbocharged Ecotec engine, a 6-speed manual transmission and all-wheel drive.

The production GS left most of the concept specifications intact, but is front-wheel drive. The GS features Buick's Interactive Drive Control System with GS mode, a choice of an FGP Germany F40-6 six-speed manual or Aisin AF-40 (G2) six-speed automatic transmission, high performance brakes with Brembo front calipers and high performance strut (HiPerStrut) front suspension. 19 inch wheels were offered standard, with 20 inch forged aluminum wheels available as an option. The production version is equipped with GS-only high-output version of the Ecotec 2.0L turbo engine with 270 hp (201 kW) at 5300 rpm and 295 lb⋅ft (400 N⋅m) of torque at 2400 rpm. The GM LHU engine used in the GS trim makes 135 hp per liter - Buick's highest specific output ever. The GS has a quoted 0 to 60 mph (97 km/h) time of 6.7 seconds (Motor Trend achieved 6.3 seconds) and a quarter mile time of 14.9 seconds. The GS went on sale in fall 2011 as a 2012 model.

Shanghai GM's locally produced variant of the Regal GS went on sale in China on September 15, 2011. The output of the 2.0L Turbo SIDI engine is 162 kW (217 hp), which is about 40 kW (54 hp) less than the production US-model. The torque is 350 N⋅m (258 lb⋅ft). and the top speed is claimed as 232 km/h (144 mph). The car is only offered in this case as a front-wheel-drive. There exist also some interior and exterior differences between the American and Chinese models.

==== Sport Touring Edition ====
For 2016, the Regal added a new Sport Touring Edition which included unique 18-inch aluminum black pocket wheels and a rear lip spoiler. This remained in the lineup for this generation's final model year.

==== eAssist ====
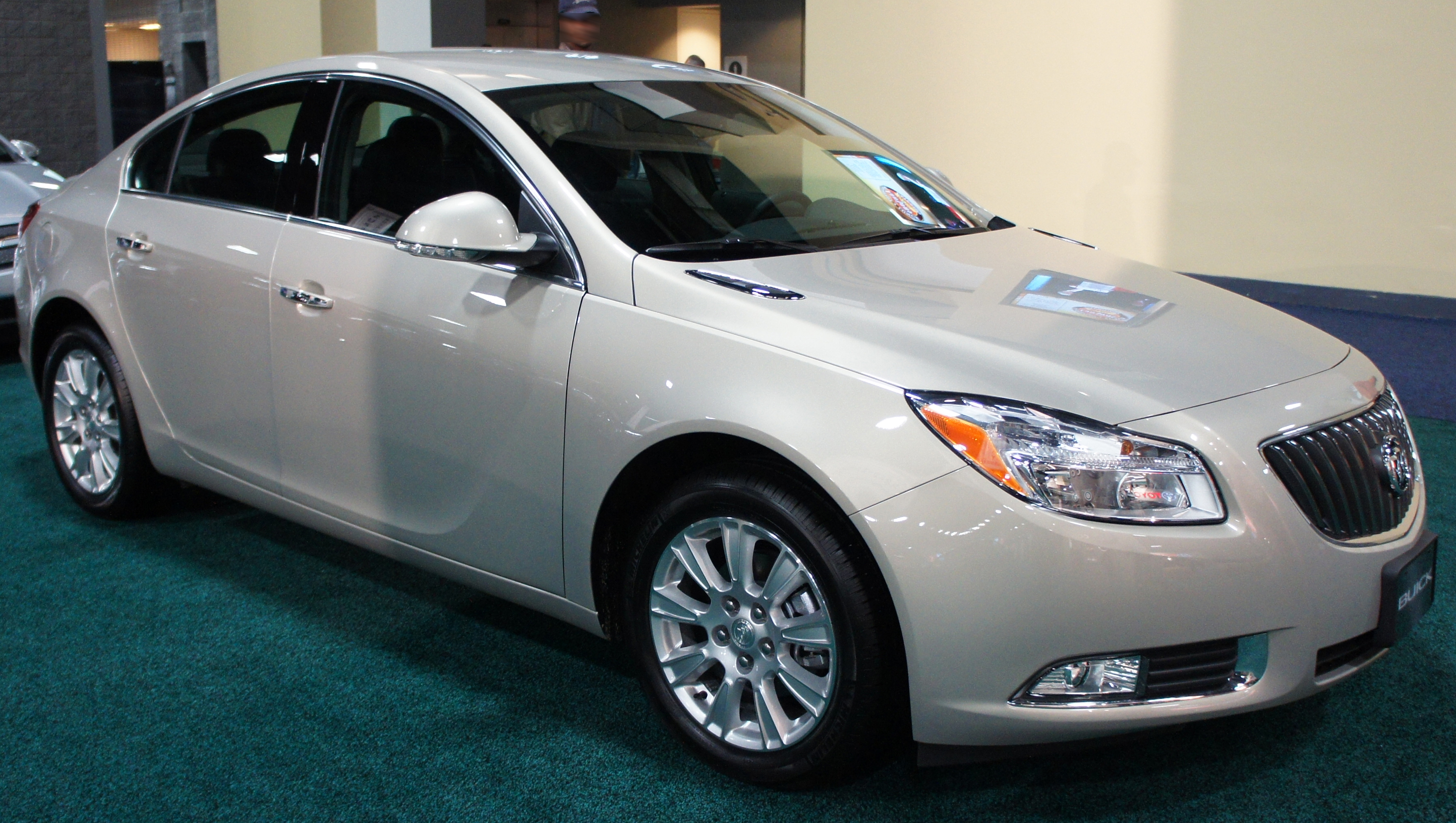
2012 Buick Regal with optional eAssist hybrid system

Beginning in 2011, Buick began offering the eAssist system in the Regal, The 2012 model year Regal is the second GM vehicle to offer eAssist after the 2012 Buick LaCrosse. The eAssist system is standard in the LaCrosse 2.5 L I4, but the eAssist powertrain is optional in the Regal.

The eAssist system adds a lithium-ion battery housed in the trunk, along with regenerative braking, engine stop/start, fuel cut-off, grille louvres that close at speed, underbody panels and low-rolling resistance tires. The eAssist system adds up to 15 hp (11 kW) to the standard 2.4L Ecotec engine during acceleration. Fuel economy for the Regal with eAssist is estimated at 26 mpg_{‑US} (9.0 L/100 km; 31 mpg_{‑imp}) city, 37 mpg_{‑US} (6.4 L/100 km; 44 mpg_{‑imp}) highway.

=== 2014 update ===
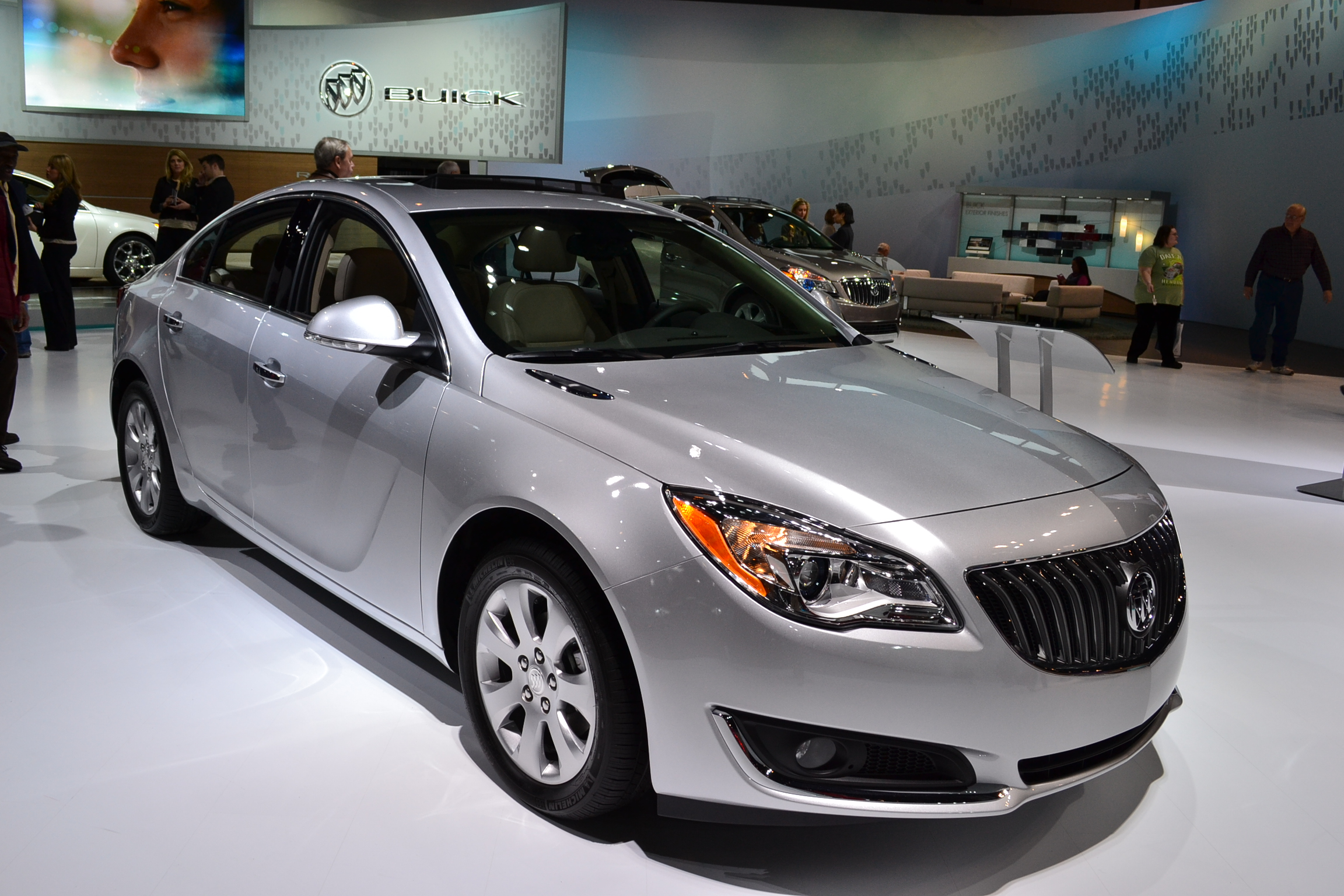
2014 Buick Regal eAssist

GM presented an updated 2014 Regal at the 2013 New York Auto Show. Changes included a revised interior and exterior, an increase to 258 hp (192 kW) and 295 lb·ft (400 N·m) of torque for the CXL Turbo and an available all-wheel drive option for the 2.0L engine/6-speed automatic transmission equipped vehicles. Changes for the GS included revised interior and exterior, a drop in power to match that of the CXL Turbo, and available an all-wheel-drive option offered for the 2.0L / six-speed automatic transmission equipped vehicles. The six-speed manual transmission was offered in the front-wheel-drive variant. Buick's VentiPorts reappeared starting with 2014 models, a styling feature first used by Buick in 1949.

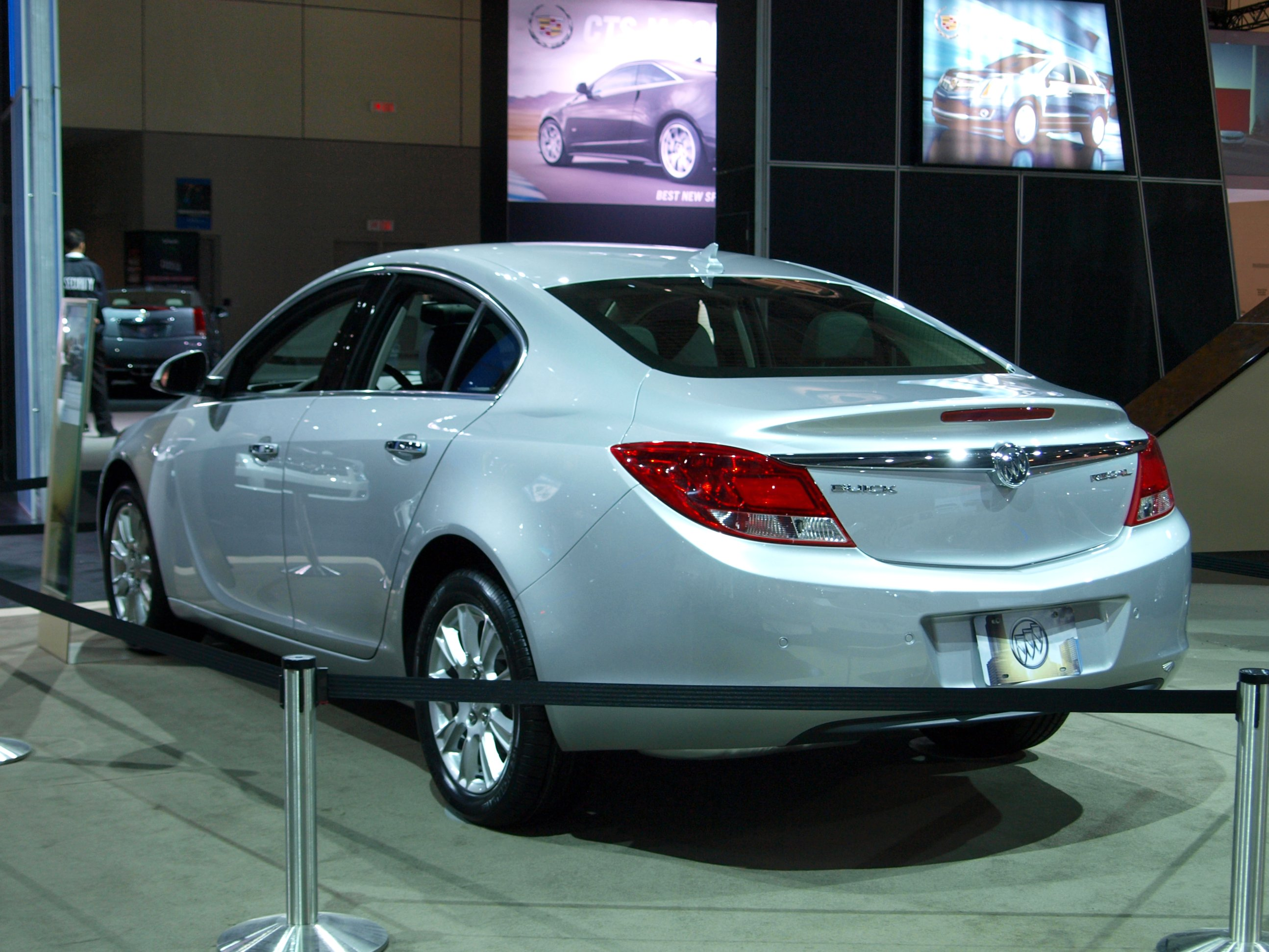
Buick Regal Pre-Facelift Rear View

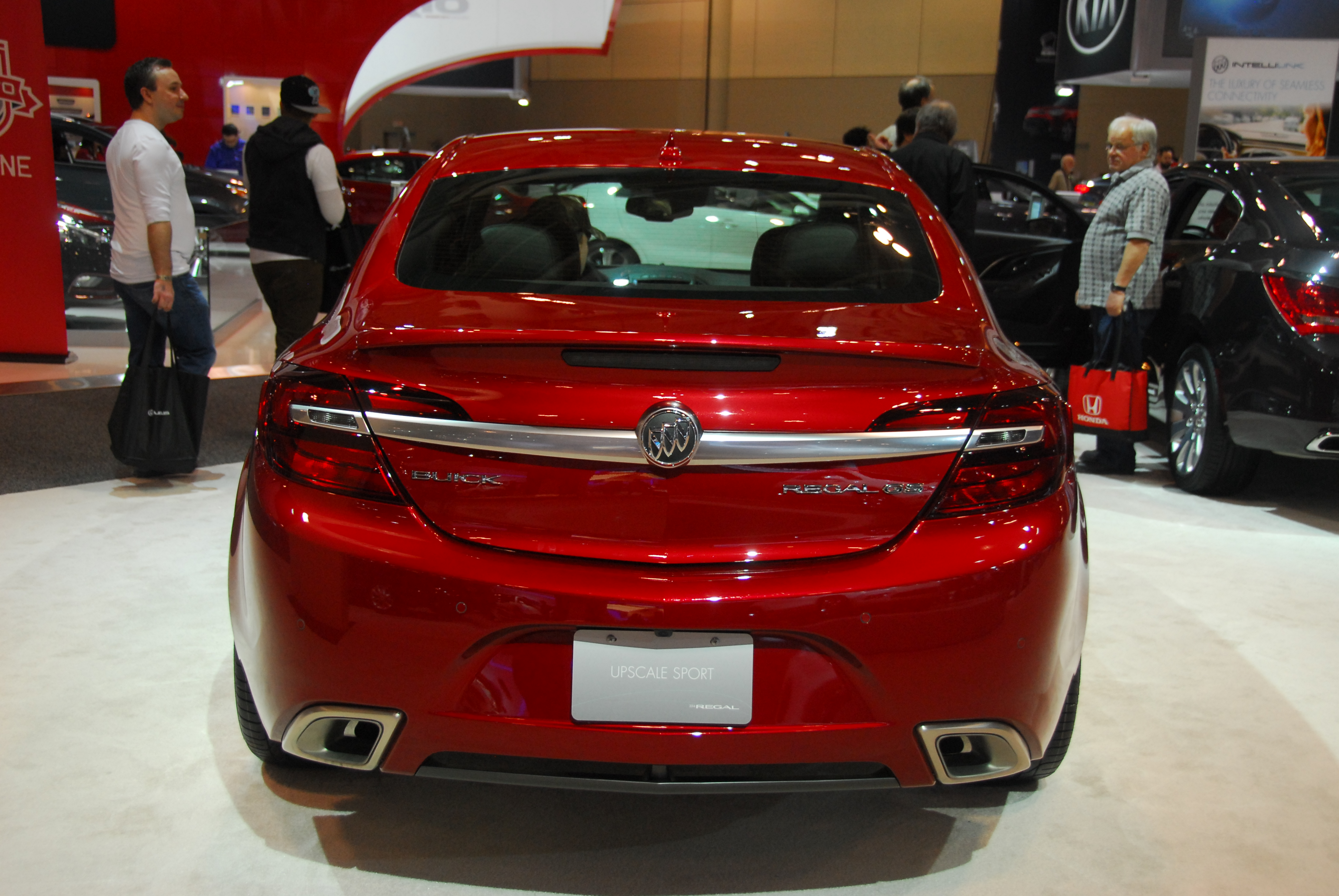
Buick Regal Facelifted Rear View

For model year 2014, safety features included forward collision warning, lane-departure warning, blind-spot monitoring, rear cross-traffic alert, and a following-distance indicator. The foregoing are all part of a Driver Confidence package, while collision preparation, which pre-loads the brake system ahead of an imminent collision, and adaptive cruise control are available separately.

Shanghai GM Regal Engines (Gasoline)
Engine model	Type	Displacement	Power	Torque	Year
1.6T	I4	1,598 cc	179 PS (132 kW; 177 hp) at 5,800 rpm	220 N⋅m (162 lbf⋅ft) at 2,200–5,400 rpm	2009–2017
2.0	I4	1,998 cc	147 PS (108 kW; 145 hp) at 6,200 rpm	190 N⋅m (140 lbf⋅ft) at 4,600 rpm	2008–2017
2.0T SIDI	I4	1,998 cc	220 PS (162 kW; 218 hp) at 5,300 rpm	350 N⋅m (258 lbf⋅ft) at 2,000–4,000 rpm	2009–2013
2.0T SIDI GS	I4	1,998 cc	254 PS (187 kW; 250 hp) at 5,300 rpm	350 N⋅m (258 lbf⋅ft) at 2,000–4,000 rpm	2013–2017
2.4	I4	2,384 cc	170 PS (125 kW; 168 hp) at 6,400 rpm	225 N⋅m (166 lb⋅ft) at 4,800 rpm	2008–2010
2.4 SIDI	I4	2,384 cc	186 PS (137 kW; 183 hp) at 6,200 rpm	240 N⋅m (177 lbf⋅ft) at 4,800 rpm	2011–2017

== Sixth generation (2018) ==
Sixth generation
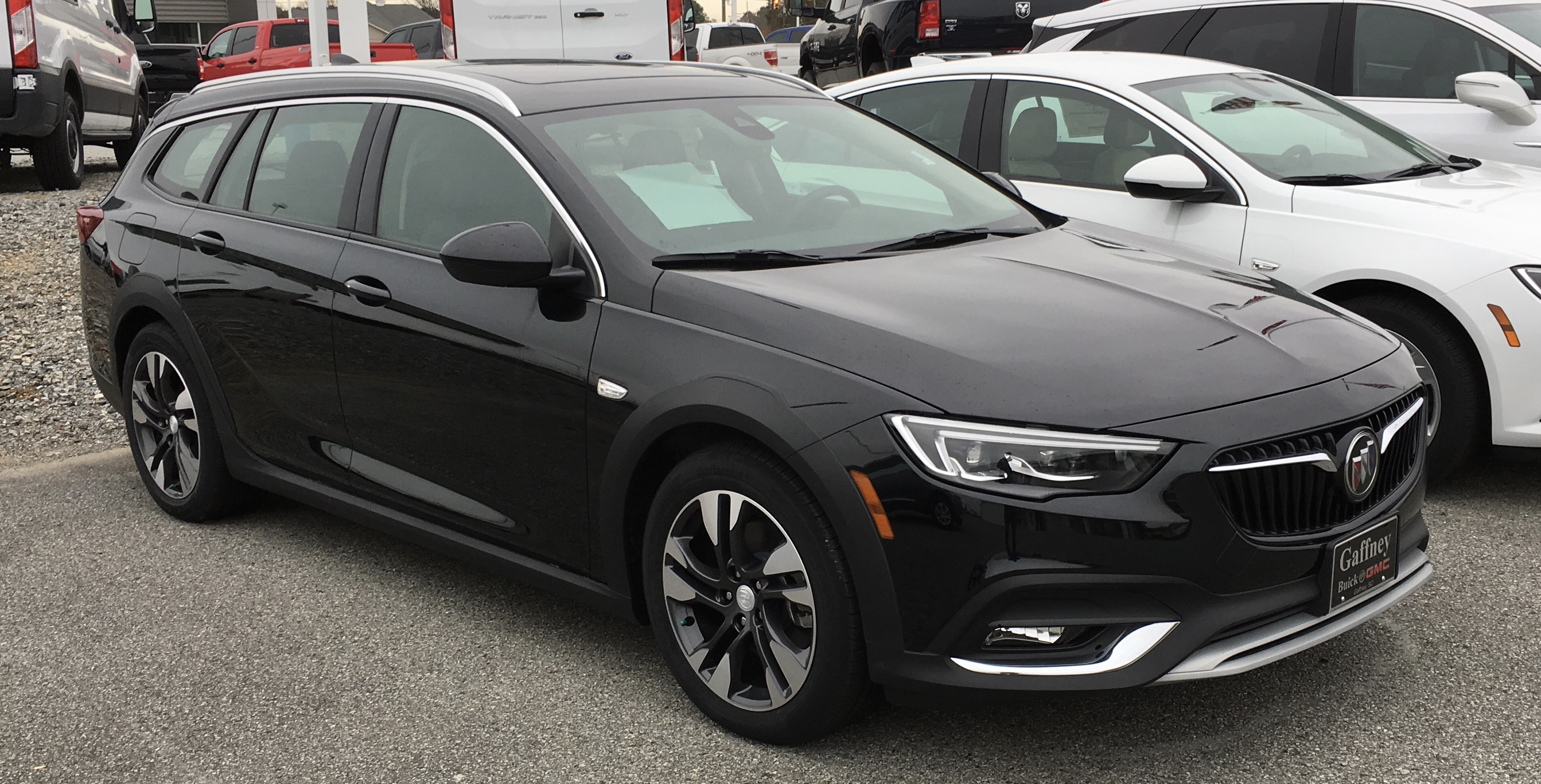
- 2020 Buick Regal TourX in South Carolina

Overview
- Manufacturer: Opel AG (North America); SAIC-GM (China)
- Also called: Opel Insignia (Europe); Vauxhall Insignia (United Kingdom); Holden Commodore (Australasia)
- Production: 2017–present
- Model years: 2018–2020 (North America); 2018–present (China)
- Assembly: China: Shanghai (SAIC-GM); Germany: Rüsselsheim am Main (Opel)
- Designer: Mark Adams; Malcolm Ward

Body and chassis
- Body style: 4-door sedan (China); 5-door fastback sedan (sportback); 5-door wagon (TourX)
- Layout: FF layout / F4 layout
- Platform: E2XX platform
- Related: Buick LaCrosse; Chevrolet Malibu

Powertrain
- Engine: (Opel-Buick); 2.0L LTG I4 turbo; 3.6L LGX V6; (SAIC-GM); 1.5 L LFV I4 (turbo); 1.8 L LKN I4; 2.0 L LTG I4 turbo; 2.0 L LSY I4 turbo
- Electric motor: 54 kW (73 PS; 72 bhp) GM Voltec integrated electric motors
- Transmission: Aisin AWF8F45 8-speed automatic (I4 AWD); GM Hydramatic 9T65 9-speed automatic (I4 FWD, V6 AWD); CVT (30H hybrid, China only)
- Hybrid drivetrain: FHEV (30H)
- Battery: 1.5-kWh lithium-ion battery (30H)

Dimensions
- Wheelbase: 111.4 in (2,830 mm)
- Length: 192.7 in (4,890 mm); 196.4 in (4,990 mm) (TourX)
- Width: 73.3 in (1,860 mm)
- Height: 57.3 in (1,460 mm); 58.4 in (1,480 mm) (TourX)

On April 4, 2017, GM presented the sixth-generation 2018 Buick Regal at the GM Design Dome in Warren, Michigan; sales of the model line began in China on July 21, 2017. As with the Buick Cascada, the Regal became a captive import, as Buick sourced production of the model line entirely from Opel in Rüsselsheim, Germany. Derived from the Opel/Vauxhall Insignia B, the American-market Regal also gained a third divisional counterpart, as the model became the basis of the Holden ZB Commodore (the final generation of the Commodore line).

The Regal moved to the GM E2XX (third-generation Epsilon) platform, adding 3.6 inches of wheelbase. While most closely related to the ninth (final) generation Chevrolet Malibu, it also shared its underpinnings with the third-generation Buick LaCrosse. Though growing in size, a key objective of the platform update was weight reduction, with 300–500 lb (136–227 kg) of curb weight removed.

In a major design change, the Regal four-door sedan became exclusive to China, with all Regal sedans in North America moving to a five-door liftback configuration. The Regal TourX station wagon was introduced for 2018, becoming the first Regal station wagon since 1983.

=== Regal Sportback ===
Replacing the previous Regal four-door sedan, the Regal Sportback is a 5-door liftback sedan; the hatchback was incorporated within a fastback roofline, allowing for additional cargo room and flexibility.

Buick offered three standard trims: 1SV (base), Preferred, and Essence, along with the flagship Avenir trim. The Sportback also served as the basis of the high-performance Regal GS (see below).

Fitted with a 250 hp LTG 2.0L turbocharged I4 engine, the Sportback was offered with either front-wheel drive (260 lb⋅ft (353 N⋅m) of torque, 9-speed automatic) or optional all-wheel drive (295 lb⋅ft (400 N⋅m) of torque, 8-speed automatic).

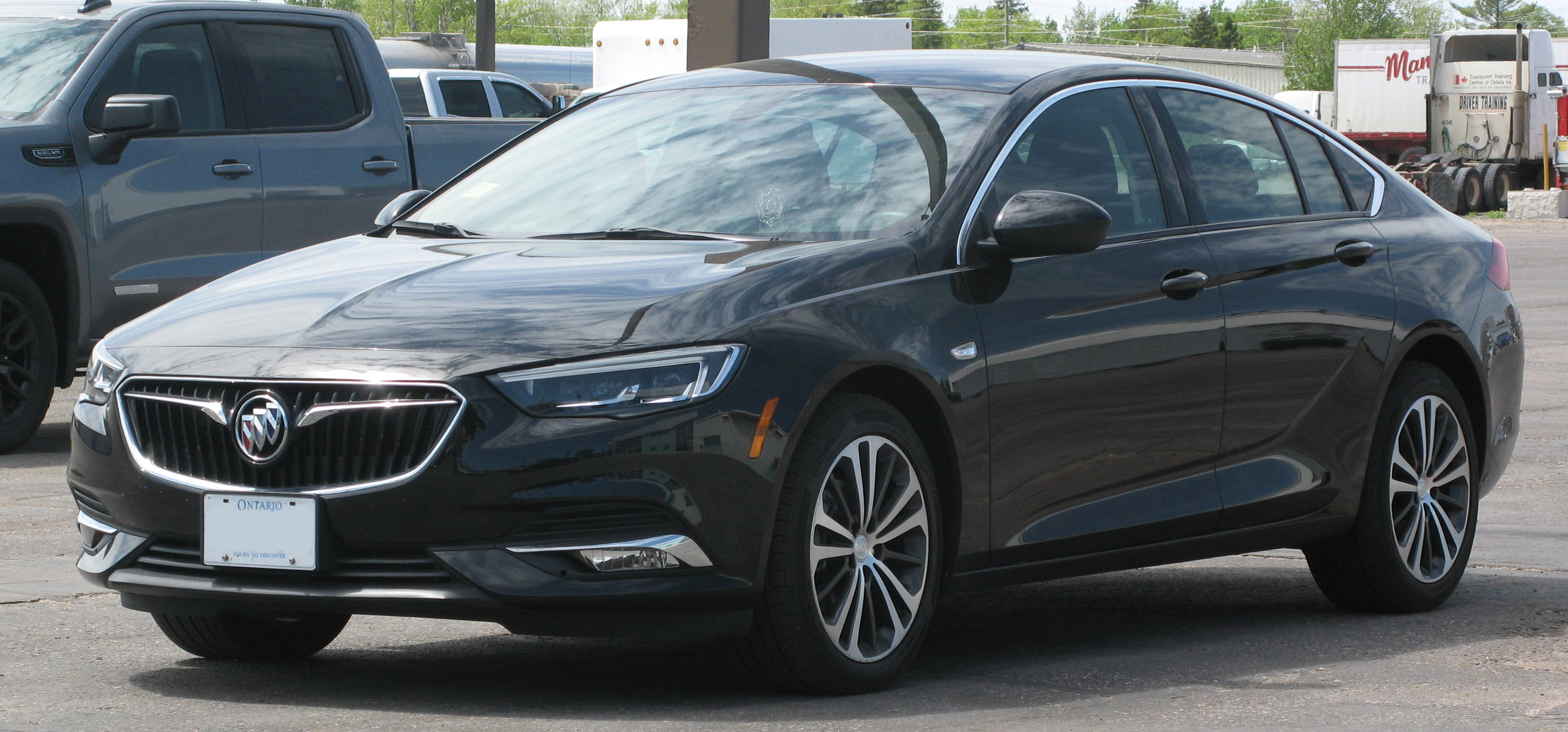
2019 Buick Regal Sportback (Preferred trim)

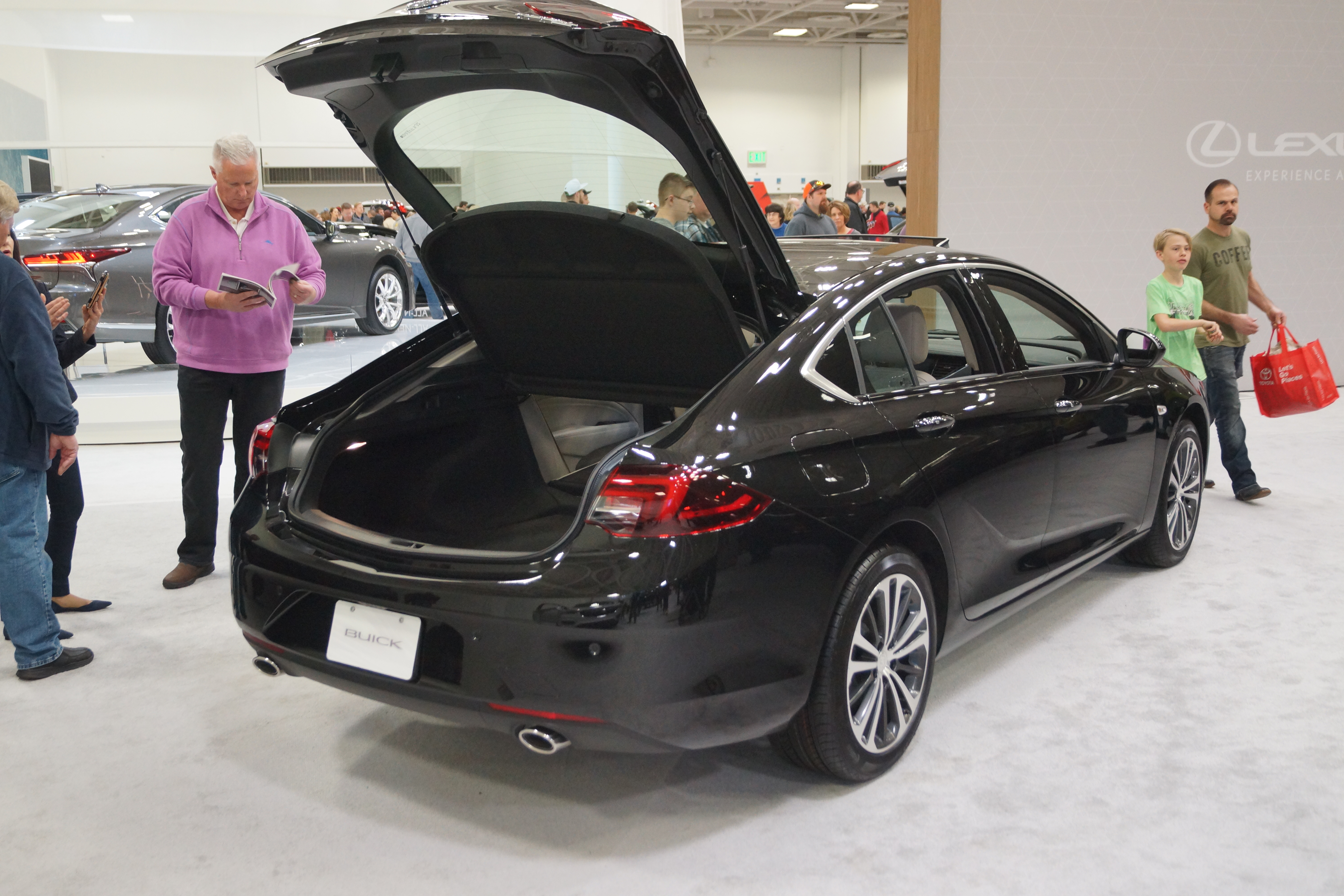
2018 Buick Regal Sportback (Essence trim), liftback open

=== Regal TourX ===
The Buick Regal TourX is a 5-door station wagon, serving as the divisional counterpart of the Opel/Vauxhall Insignia Country Tourer and the Holden Commodore ZB Calais Tourer. Developed as a rugged-style station wagon with plastic body cladding, slightly raised ride height, and standard all-wheel drive, the TourX was developed as a competitor of the Subaru Outback and the Volvo Cross Country lines, though marketed towards sportier touring than heavier off-road use. The Insignia Country Tourer was a body style introduced during the previous generation, but was ultimately not produced or imported by GM.

The first Regal station wagon in 35 years, the 2018 TourX was the first Buick station wagon of any kind since the 1996 retirement of the Roadmaster and Century Estates. Sized between the Subaru Outback and Volvo V90, the TourX was one of the largest station wagons sold in North America; its 73.5 cubic feet of cargo space matched the Outback and was the most of any Buick (with the exception of the three-row Buick Enclave).

Buick offered the TourX with three trims: 1SV (base), Preferred, and Essence (the Avenir and GS were not offered)

Fitted with the 250 hp LTG turbocharged I4 (295 lb⋅ft (400 N⋅m) of torque), the TourX only used an 8-speed automatic transmission.

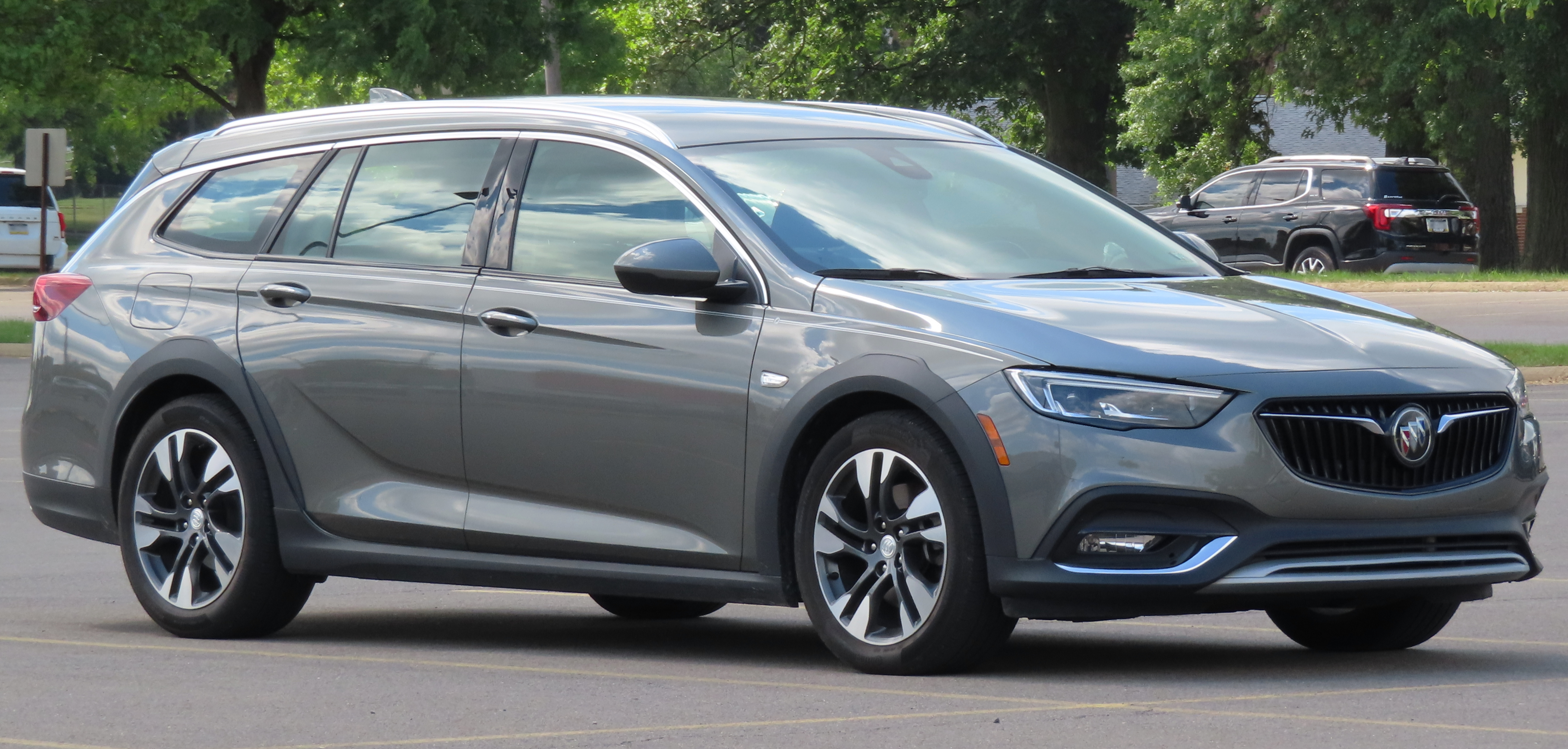
Buick Regal TourX (US)

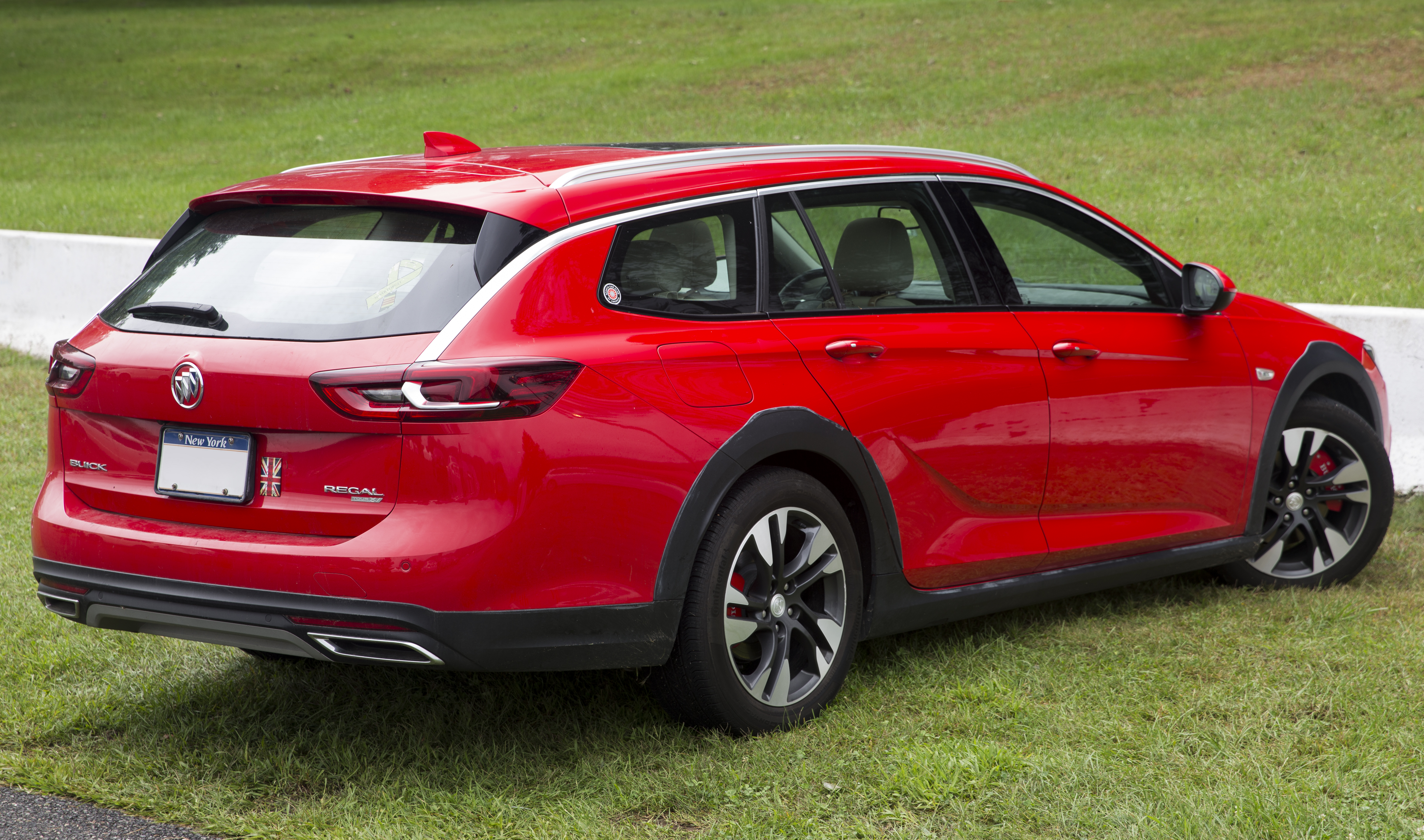
Buick Regal TourX (US)

=== Regal GS ===
The Regal GS (Gran Sport) is the highest-performance version of the Buick Regal. Returning from the previous generation, the Regal GS is the counterpart of the Opel/Vauxhall Insignia GSi (replacing the previous OPC) and the Holden Commodore VXR. In keeping with the previous generation, the GS featured a higher-performance powertrain, sportier styling, and upgrading suspension and brakes. In a major change, the GS now shared the standard all-wheel drive of its Opel counterpart.

The GS shared its liftback body with the Regal Sportback, but the exterior is fitted with its own grille, front and rear bumpers, 19-inch wheels (the previous 20-inch wheels were retired), and an integrated decklid spoiler. The interior was fitted with heavily-bolstered front seats, a digital instrument cluster, and GS-specific trim.

As the turbocharged LTG from the previous GS became the standard engine for the Sportback and TourX (retuned slightly), the E2XX GS adopted its 310 hp 3.6L V6 engine from the Holden Commodore and Buick LaCrosse, paired with a 9-speed automatic transmission. The most powerful Regal ever produced, the 2018–2020 GS was the first vehicle in the model line to eclipse the official (rated) power output of the 1987 Buick GNX.

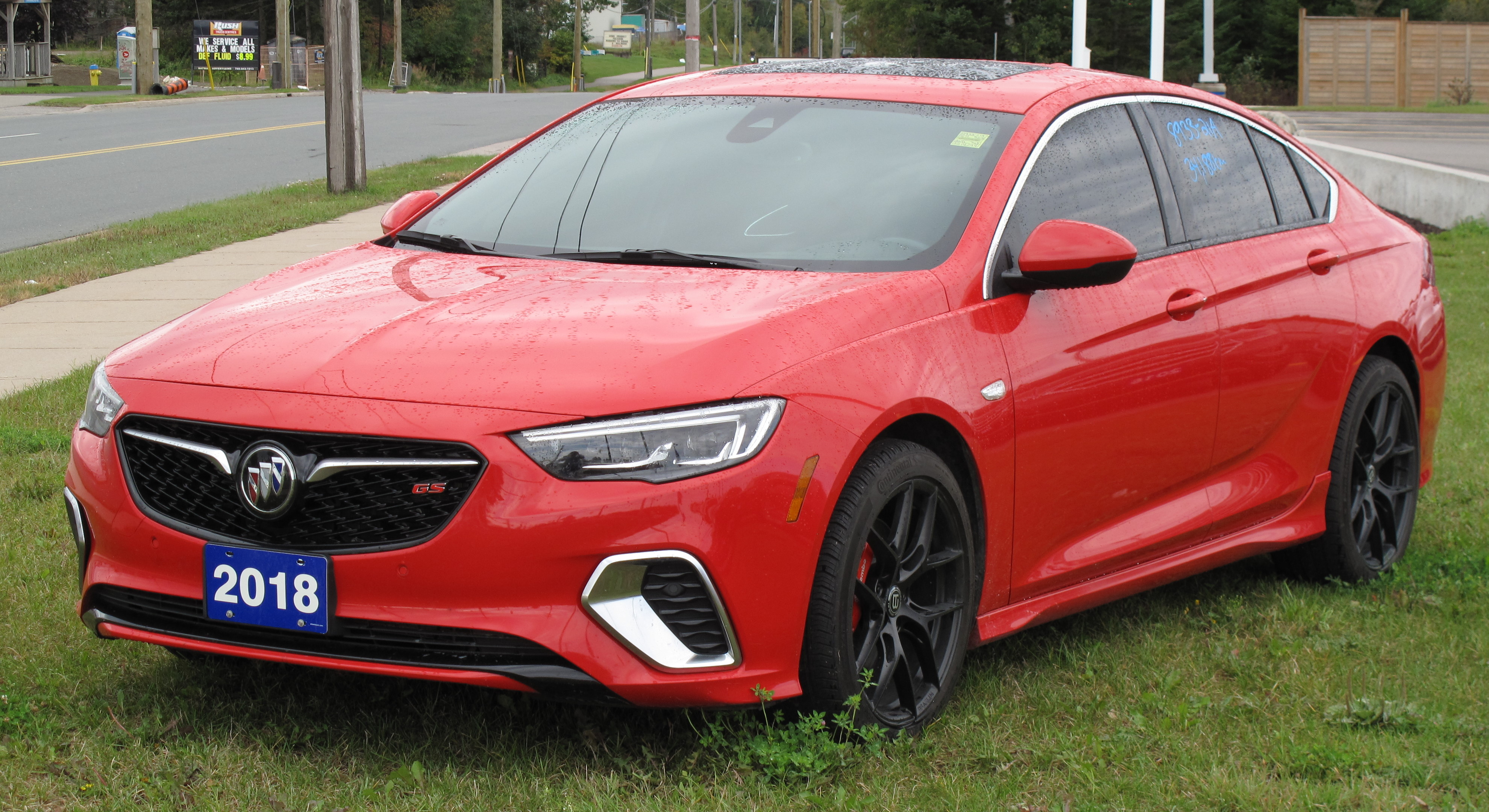
2018 Buick Regal GS

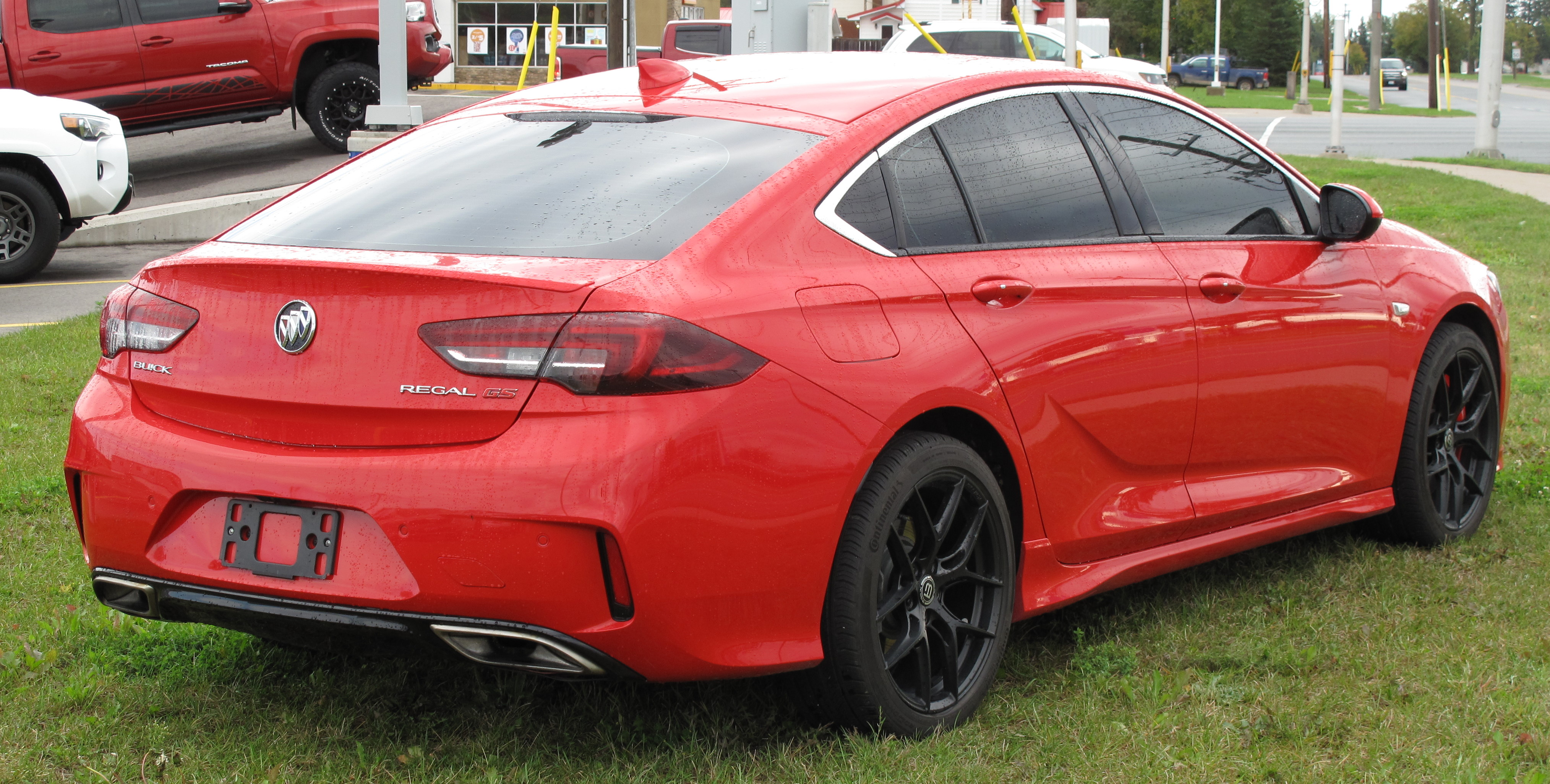
2018 Buick Regal GS

=== Regal (China) ===
For China, 2018 brought a third-generation Regal, as SAIC-GM began local production of the Opel Insignia B, marketing it between the Verano and LaCrosse sedans. While sharing the E2XX platform and a visually similar exterior, the SAIC-produced Regal differed substantially from its Opel-designed counterpart, as it was designed as a four-door sedan with a traditional decklid. In China, neither the Sportback nor the TourX have been sold; the four-door has never been exported under any nameplate.

The Chinese-market Regal (sold in front-wheel drive only) was initially sold in four trims: 20T (1.5L turbo I4), 28T (2.0L turbo I4), GS (2.0L turbo I4), and 30H hybrid (1.6L I4 + EV motors). Turbocharged Regals were fitted with a 9-speed automatic transmissions while the hybrid was fitted with a CVT.

SAIC-GM Regals were visually similar to Opel-assembled units, with non-GS vehicles closest in design to Essence-trim Sportbacks (though using the digital instrument panel of the GS). For 2021, the Regal underwent a model update, receiving a restyled grille and updated dashboard and center console (with a pushbutton gear selector). For 2022, the trim levels were reduced to Luxury and GS. For 2024, a second facelift, concentrating primarily on the front fascia, brought the Regal in line with the Buick "Pure Design" style (seen on Buick American SUVs), giving the model a revised Buick tri-shield emblem. As a running change during 2025, SAIC-GM debuted a third facelift for the GS, combining the 2018-2023 grille size with the updated Buick tri-shield. In response to poor feedback to the "Pure Design" facelift, the company also introduced the updated GS front fascia as a replacement body kit.

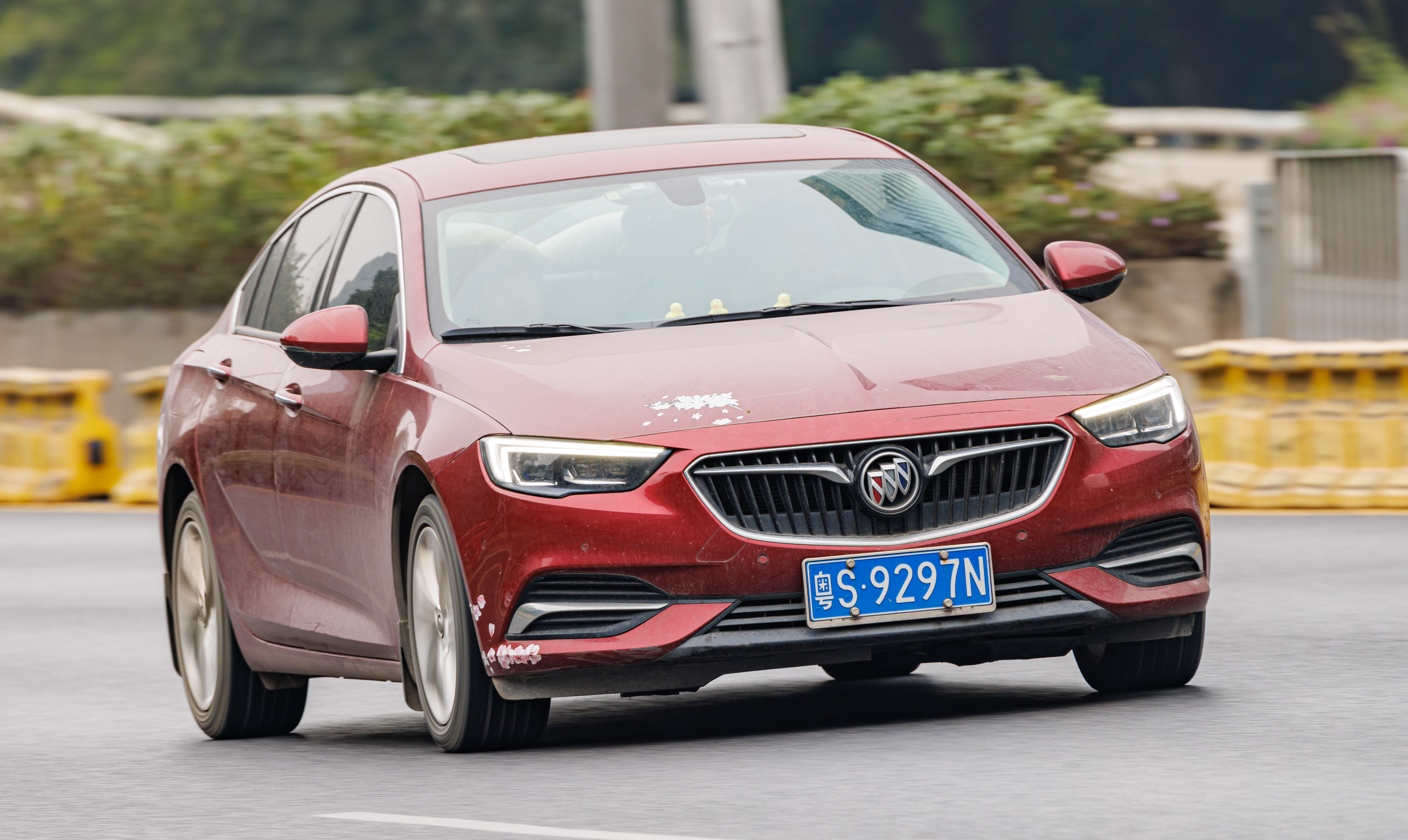
2018-2020 Buick Regal (pre-facelift)

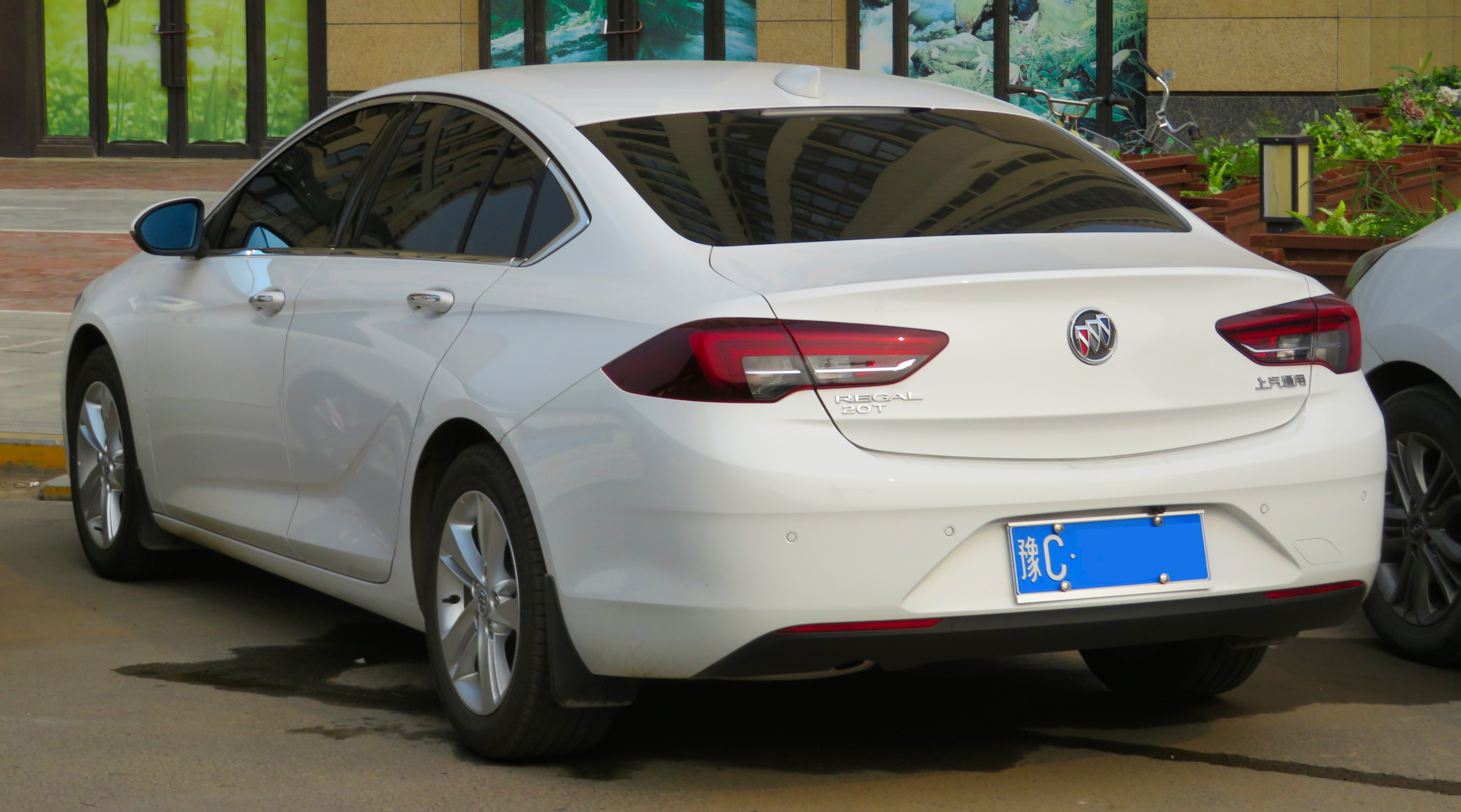
Rear view (pre-facelift)

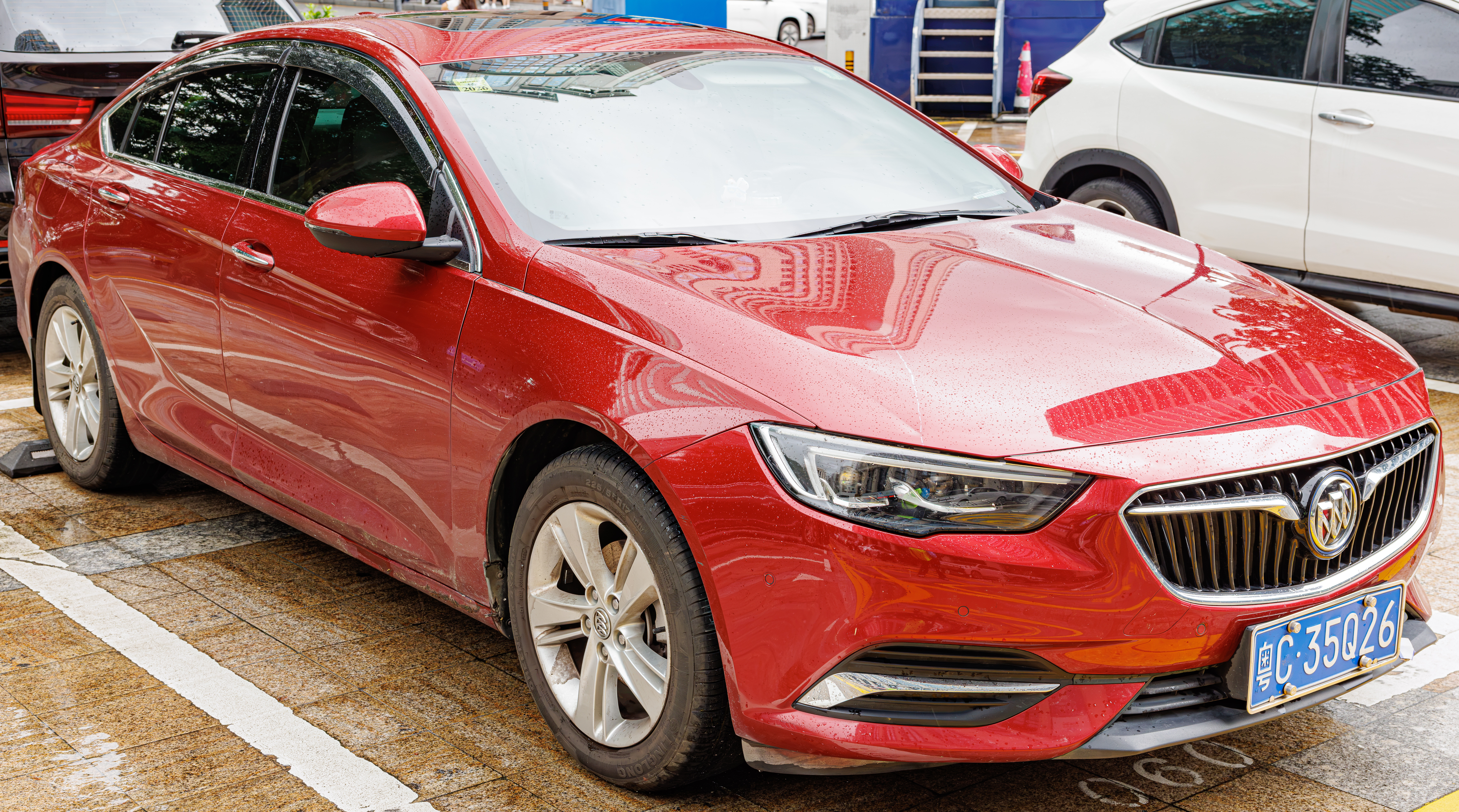
2018-2020 Buick Regal Hybrid

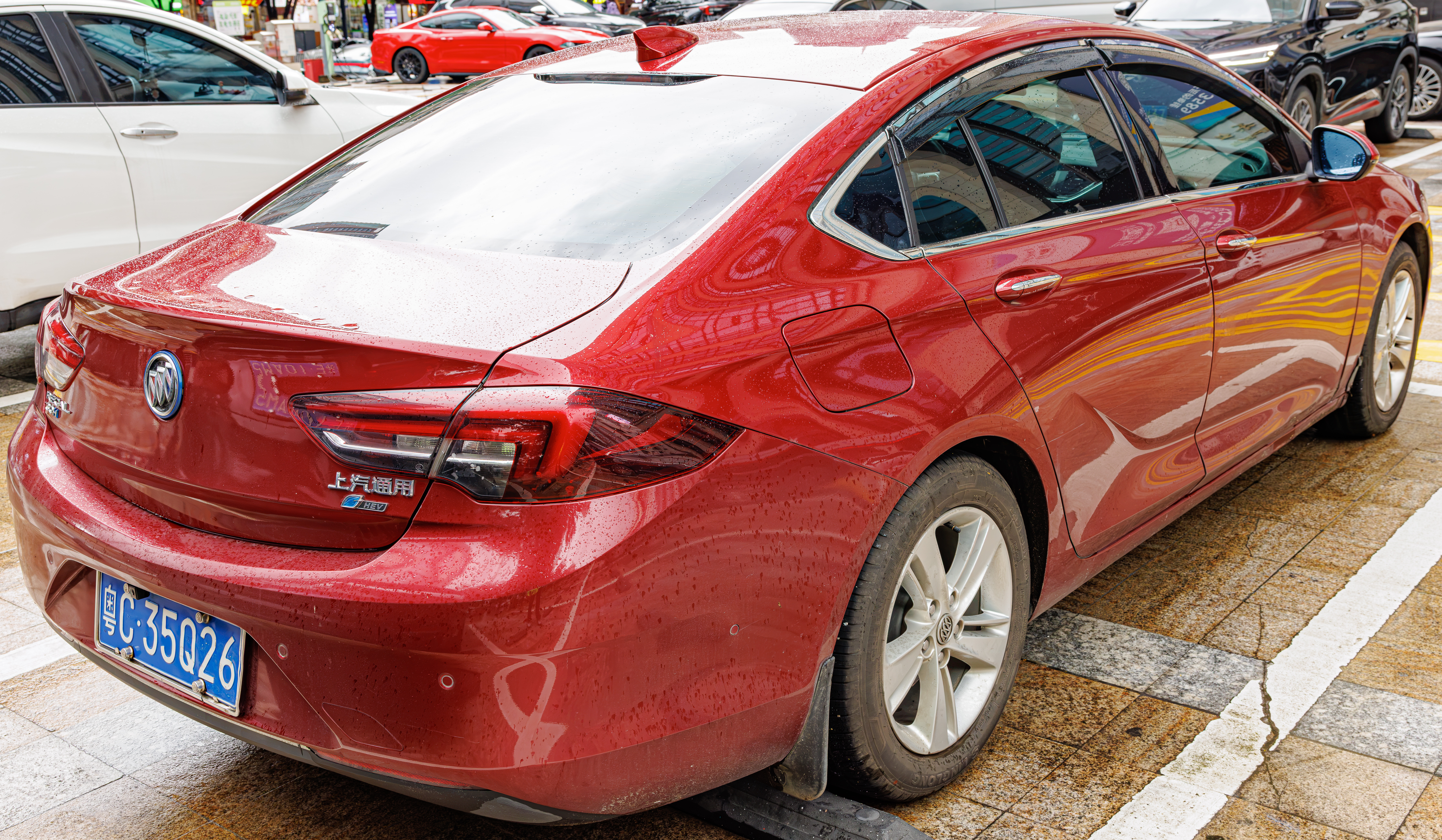
Rear view

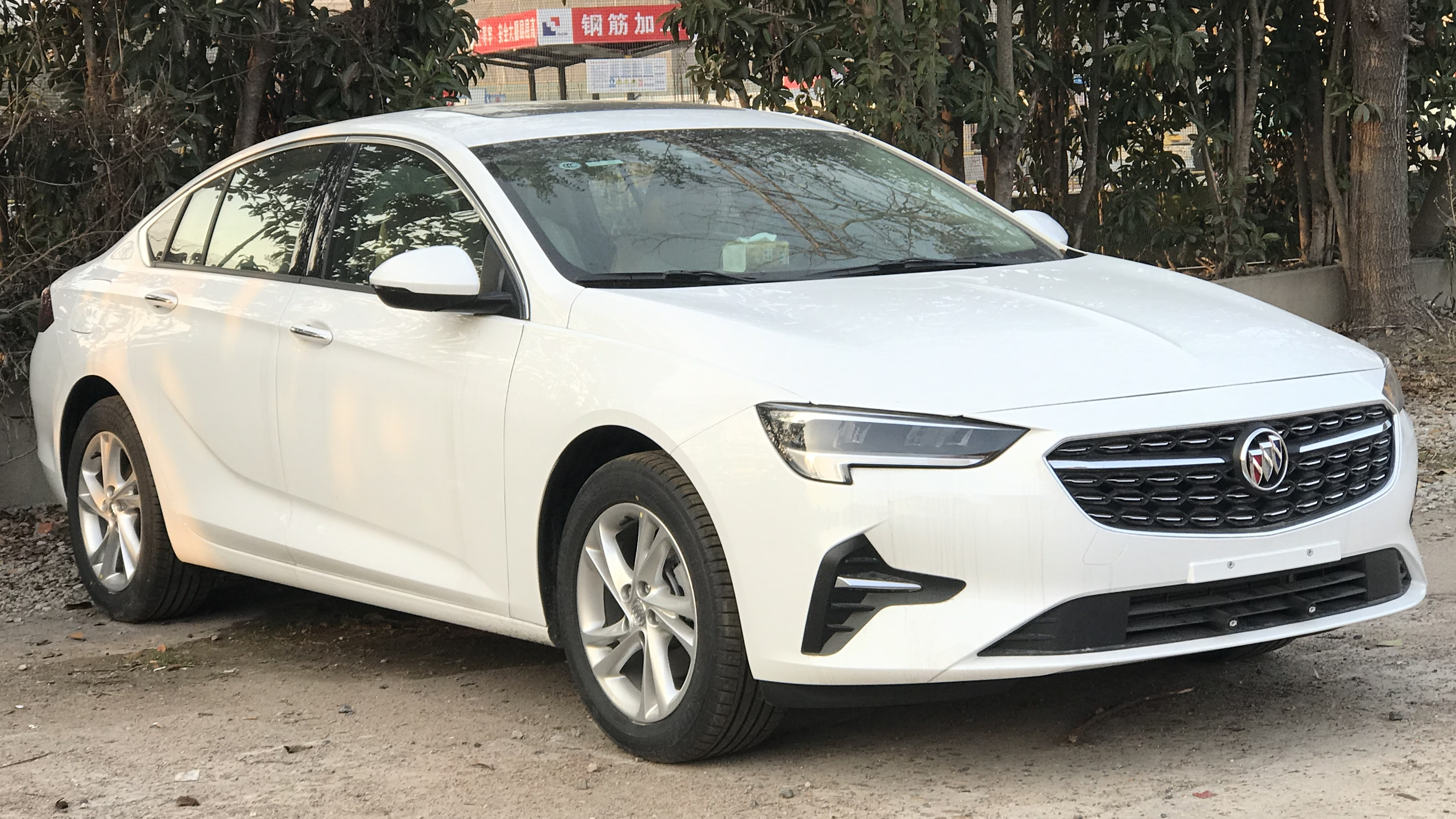
2021 Buick Regal (China; first facelift)

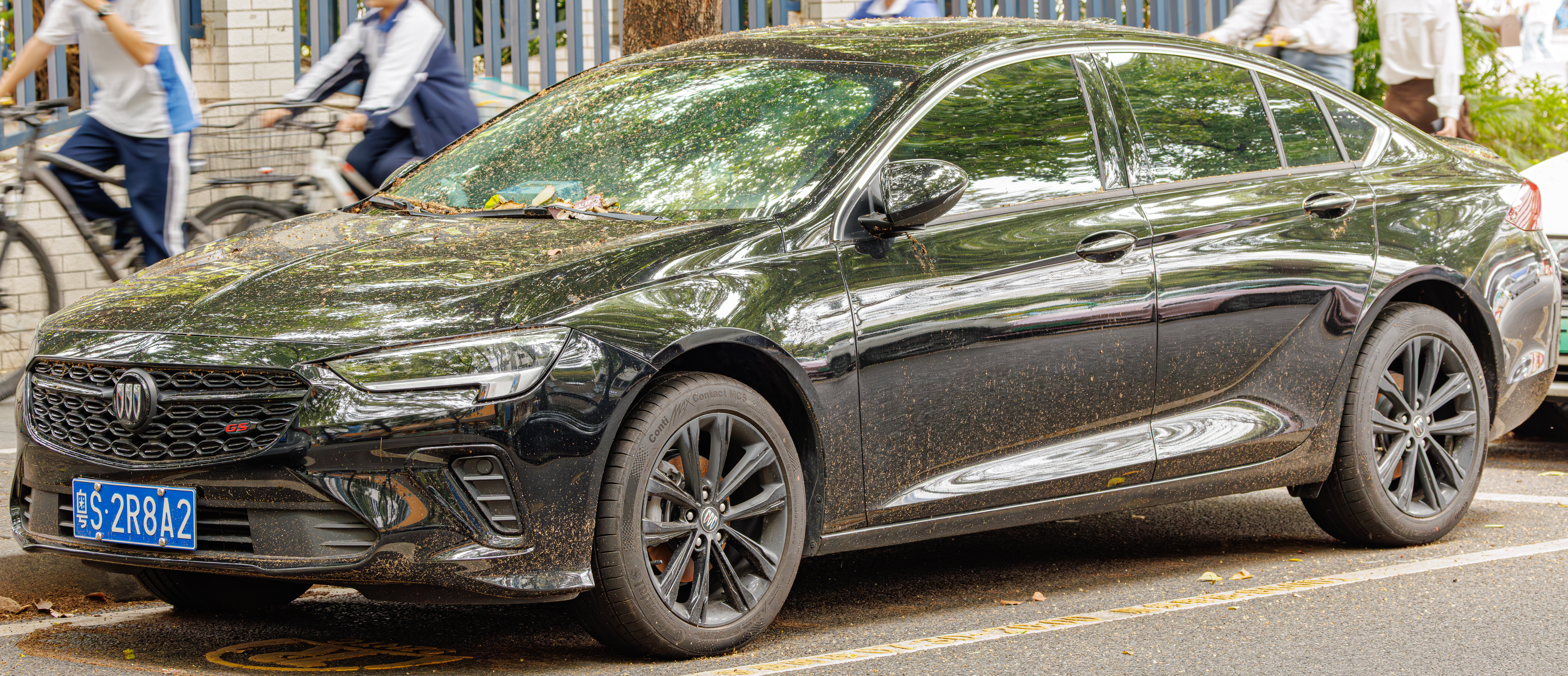
2025 Buick Regal GS

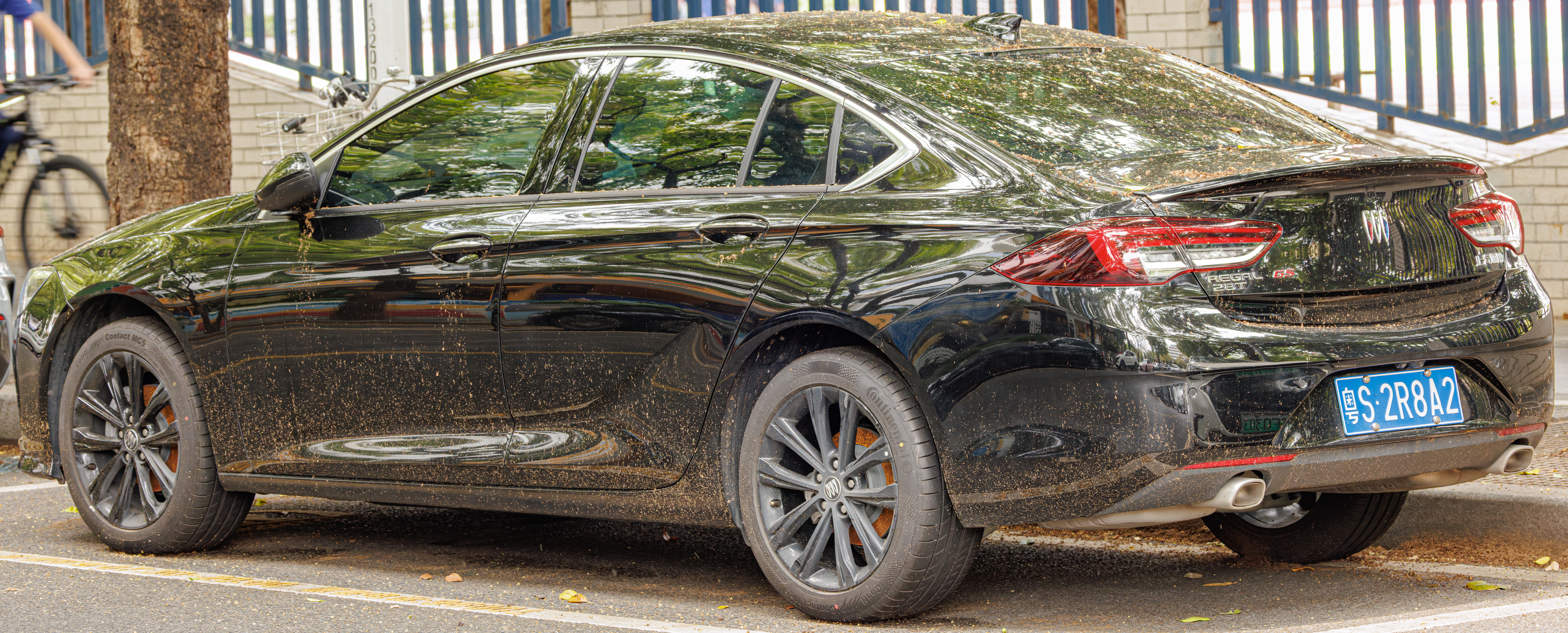
Rear view

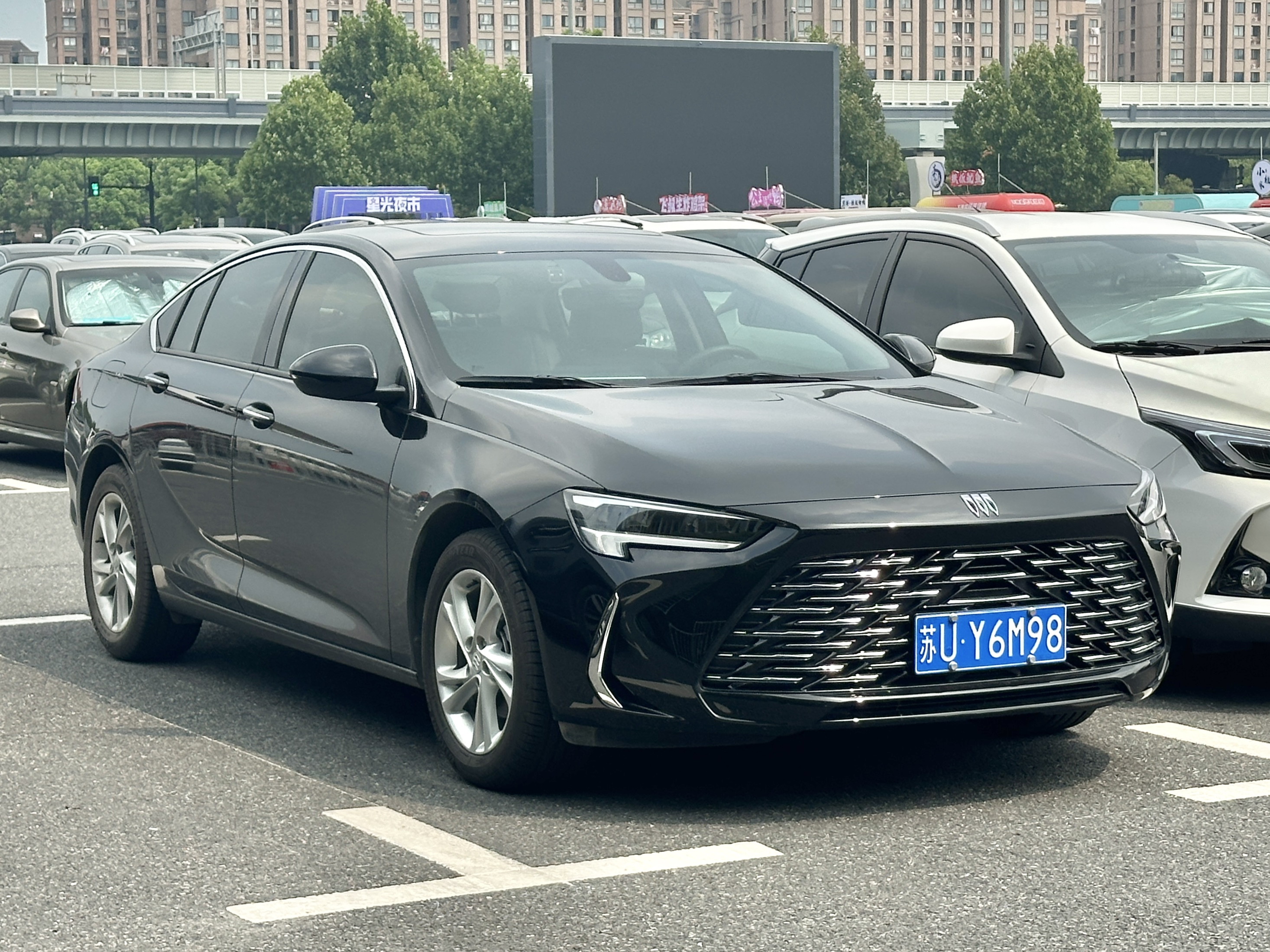
2024 Buick Regal (China; second facelift)

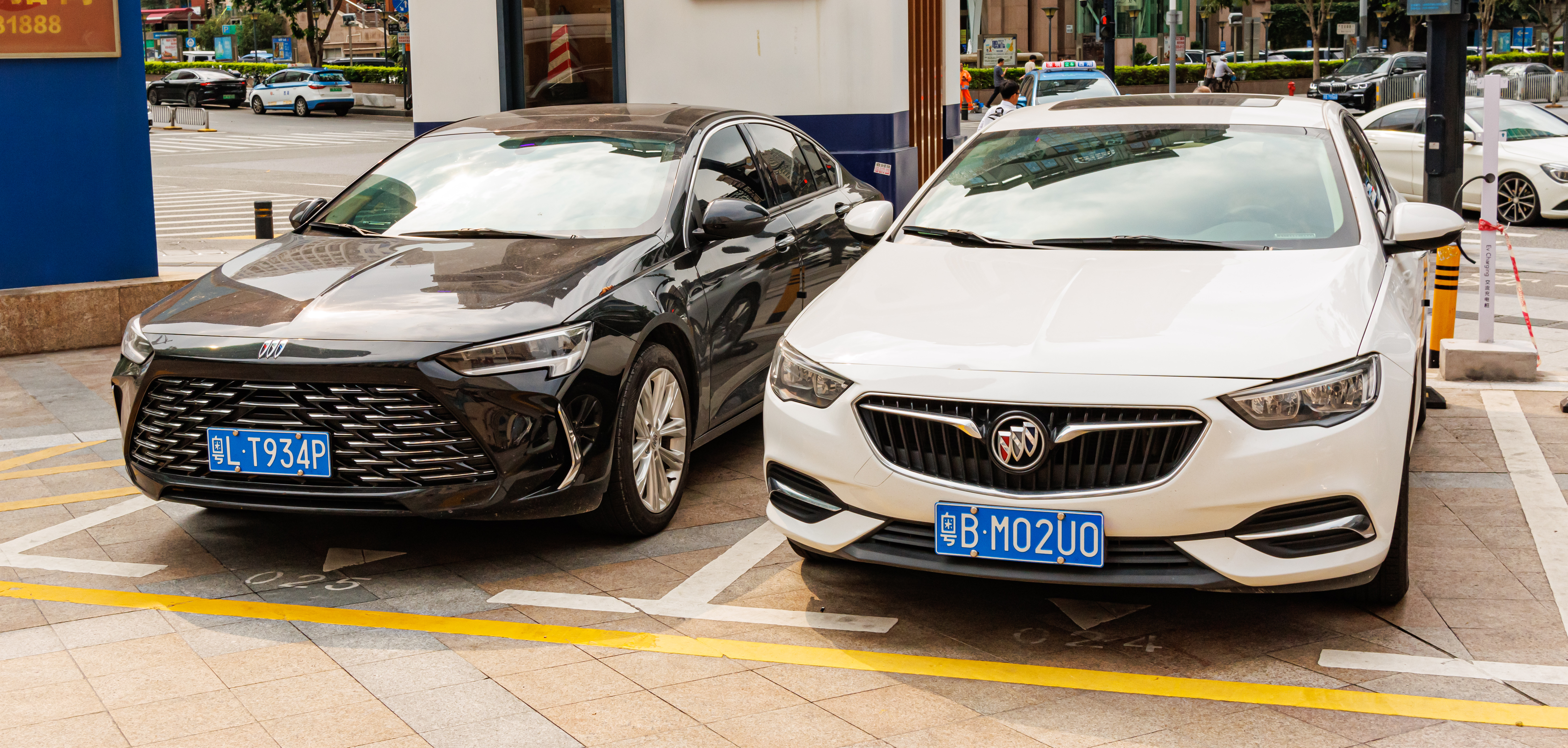
Buick Regal (second facelift, black; pre-facelift, white)

=== Discontinuation ===
In December 2019, General Motors announced that it would stop importing the Buick Regal for North America after the 2020 model year. Following the 2020 withdrawal of the Cascada and LaCrosse, Buick ended its 113-year run of manufacturing and marketing cars, that is sedans and sedan derivatives, in North America — in favor of sport utility vehicles (SUVs).

Alongside shifting consumer tastes, the discontinuation of the Regal in North America was also influenced by the sale of Opel and Vauxhall to PSA Group. While the latter did not operate in North America in 2017, at the end of 2019, PSA Group acquired FCA, which created Stellantis (the current parent company of Chrysler in North America).

In China, SAIC-GM continues to produce the Opel-designed Regal sedan, slotted between the Verano and LaCrosse sedans; the standard Regal and Regal GS underwent a model update for 2021.

== Sales ==
A total of 114 Regals were sold in Mexico between 2017 and 2019.

Calendar year	United States	China	Canada
2009	N/A	80,401	N/A
2010	12,326	79,358	820
2011	40,144	78,844	2,846
2012	26,383	85,440	1,767
2013	18,685	86,050	740
2014	22,560	111,245	816
2015	19,504	110,637	968
2016	19,833	69,300	841
2017	11,559	61,619	662
2018	14,118	100,378	821
2019	10,363	123,587	1,188
2020	2,484	135,877	241
2021	22	96,605	22
2022	—	79,145	—
2023	—	67,712	—
2024	—	43,019	—
2025	—	43,779	—
Total	197,981	1,452,996	11,732
