= T-type =

T-type or Type T may refer to:

== Automobiles ==
- T-Type, a series of cars made by Buick in the 1980s
- MG T-type, sports cars produced by MG from 1936 to 1955
- AEC T-type, a bus produced in 1920

== Other ==
- T-type asteroid, rare inner-belt asteroids of unknown composition
- T-type astronomical object, a type of substellar object
- T-type calcium channel, low voltage activated calcium channels
- Bristol Biplane Type 'T', a 1911 airplane

== See also ==
- T class (disambiguation)
- T series (disambiguation)
