= T class =

T class may refer to:

- Mercedes-Benz T-Class, a van
- NZR T class, steam locomotives
- South Australian Railways T class, also Tasmanian Government Railways T class, steam locomotives
- Victorian Railways T class, diesel locomotives
- Victorian Railways T class (1874), steam locomotives
- WAGR T class, 4-4-0 steam locomotives
- WAGR T class (diesel), diesel-electric locomotives
- T-class submarine (disambiguation), several types of ships
- T-class destroyer, destroyers of the Royal Navy launched in 1942–1943
- T-Class shooting, a long range shooting sport administered by the International T-Class Confederation
- T-class Melbourne tram

== See also ==
- Class T (disambiguation)
- T (disambiguation)
- T series (disambiguation)
- T-type (disambiguation)
