= Class T =

Class T may refer to:

- Class-T amplifier, electronic audio amplifier by Tripath
- Class T, a class of brown dwarfs, called T dwarfs

== See also ==
- T class (disambiguation)
