= Buick Gran Sport =

High-performance car brand

Gran Sport
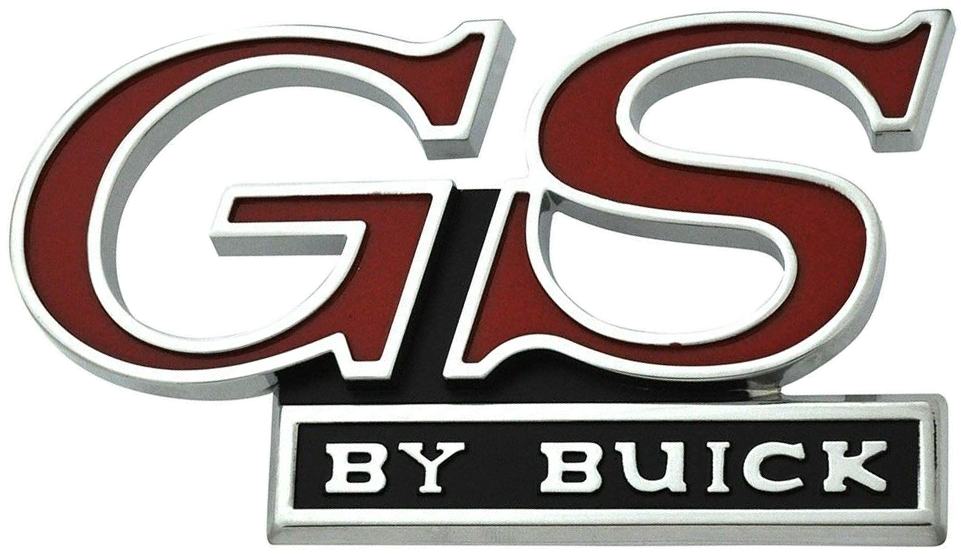
- Product type: Performance cars
- Current owner: General Motors
- Produced by: General Motors
- Introduced: 1965; 61 years ago
- Related brands: Buick T-Type
- Markets: U.S.

The Gran Sport name has been used on several high-performance cars built by General Motors for its Buick brand since 1965. In the GM brands hierarchy, Buick was surpassed in luxury and comfort appointments only by Cadillac, which did not produce performance models. As a result, the Buick GS series were the most opulently equipped GM sport models of their era.

The Gran Sport performance enhancements on all Buick products during this era sought to affirm Buick's tradition of producing powerful and comfortable products going back to the 1930s when all Buicks of the time were upgraded to the Buick Fireball Straight Eight, then installed the 278 cu in (4.6 L) Roadmaster engine in the shortest model Special and introduced the Century, known as "the banker's hot rod" with a three speed synchromesh manual transmission. The Gran Sport sought to identify cars that were fun to drive with a luxury approach.

== Skylark based Gran Sports ==
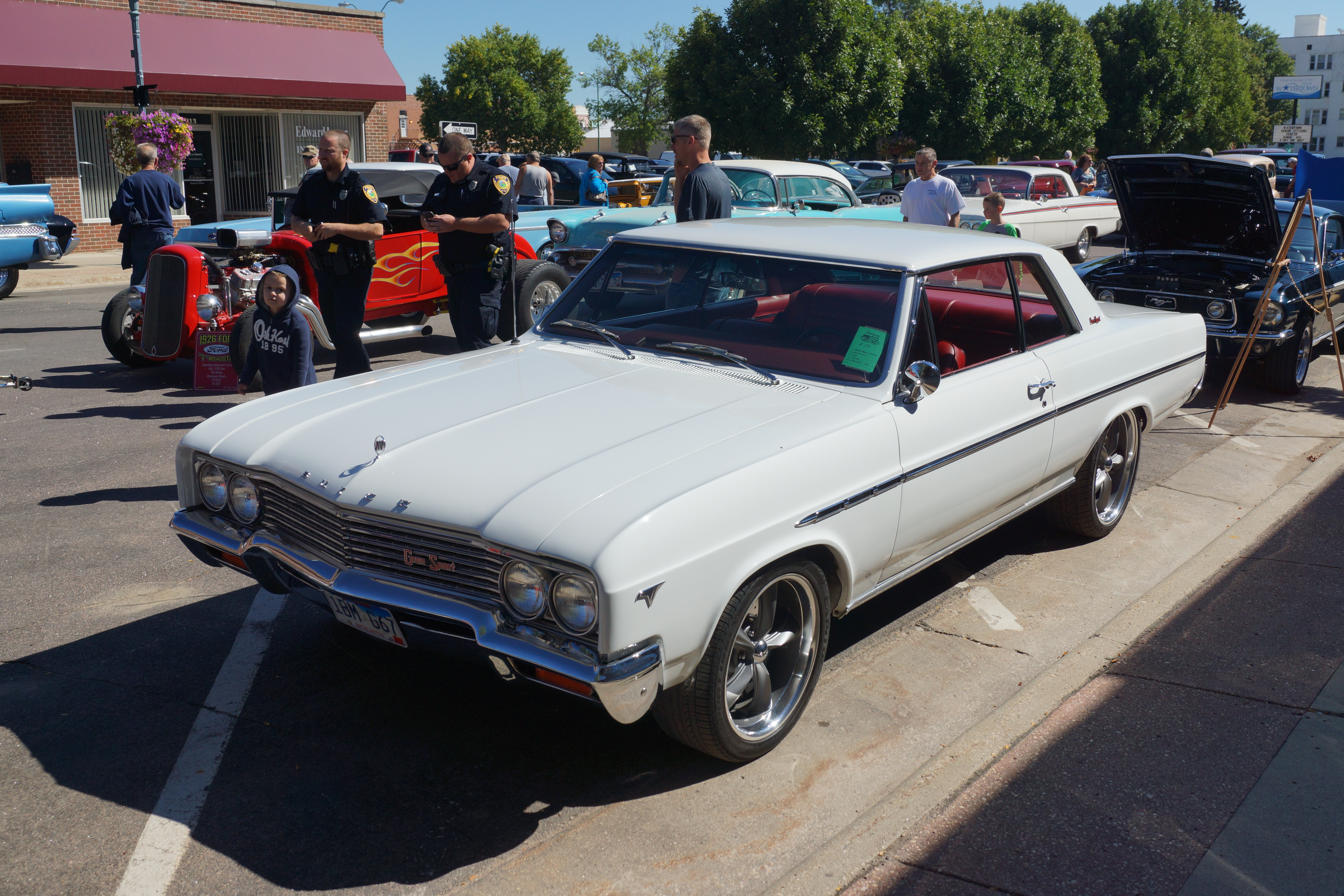
1965 Buick Gran Sport

The 1965 Skylark Gran Sport was the intermediate Buick Skylark with the Gran Sport option added. Although a 300 cubic inches (4.9 litres) V8 was already offered in the Skylark, the Gran Sport had the largest engine permitted by GM - a 401 cubic inches (6.6 litres) Buick V8 (called a 400 by Buick because that was the maximum engine size allowed in intermediate body cars). This engine produced 325 hp (242 kW) and 445 lb·ft (603 Nm) and was known as the "nailhead" engine. Buick sold more than 15,000 Skylarks with the Gran Sport option that first year, and almost as many the next. It was renamed the GS 400 in 1967, and the Gran Sport became its own model in (about) that same year along with a new "400" engine quite different from the famously reliable but becoming-obsolete nailhead engine design that was first introduced in 1953. Sales fell somewhat in the face of increasingly higher-performance and more popular muscle cars from other marques, including corporate stablemates Pontiac GTO, Chevrolet Chevelle SS and Oldsmobile 442, when compared to those from the more conservative and luxurious Buick. Buick, however, stepped it up a notch when introducing the Stage 1 option in 1969. This limited production (less than 1,500 cars in 1969) version delivered 340 hp (253 kW) and 440 lb·ft (597 Nm).

The name Gran Sport replaced the GS moniker with the 1973 Gran Sport, and was again revived in the late eighties on the FWD Skylark model with various performance options added.

=== GS California ===
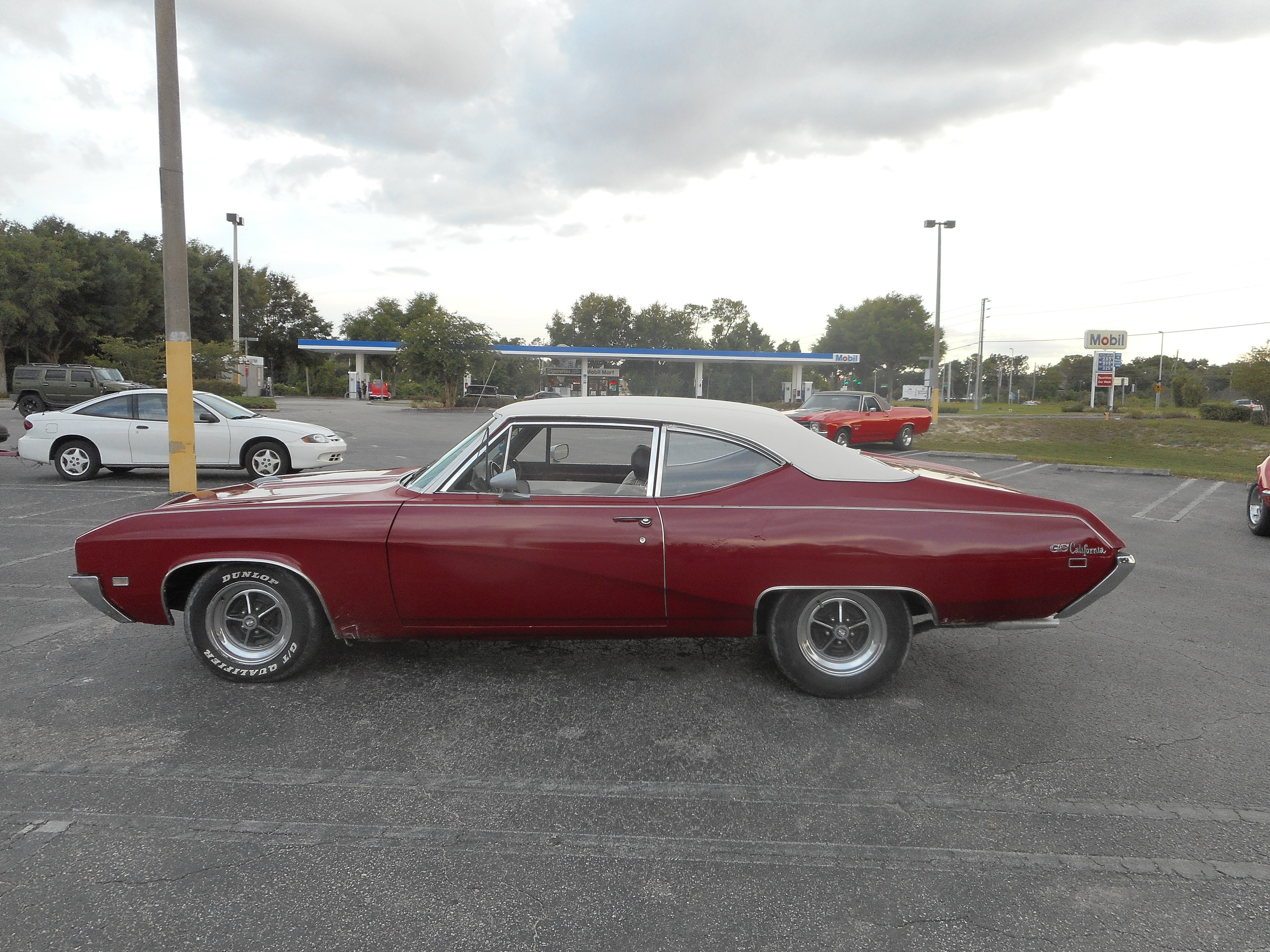
A rare GS California in a shopping center in Weeki Wachee, Florida.

Buick touted the California as "The Distinctive Personal Car for Americana on the GO", using the Skylark platform. The merchandising creation of the West Coast's Mickey Garrett, the California GS became one of Buick's entries into what is now often known as a junior musclecar. The intent of these autos were to provide the visual impact of the era's supercars with the low maintenance and price of a more economical car, while maintaining reasonable performance levels. When reviewed with these thoughts in mind the California GS delivered quite nicely. They were fitted with the small block GS drivetrain and the exterior received the full treatment including vinyl top, chrome moulding package, GS emblems, and special California scripts. This marketing approach was also used in Colorado, using the "Colorado" name instead of "California".

1967 was the maiden year for the California GS. It was available in California only and was not advertised nationally by Buick. Built on the thin-pillar coupe chassis it came equipped with the 340 ci/260 hp engine and Super Turbine 300 transmission. Bench seats were standard and accessories were kept to a minimum to help keep the price down. Car Life tested one in their June issue and ran the 1/4 in 16.7 seconds at 81 mph, they also recorded a top speed of 105 mph. The article contains a lengthy description of the car and how it performed during testing, it is a must read for anyone interested in learning more about the '67 California GS.

Mid year 1968 saw the official introduction of the California GS, and it is frequently known as a '69 model. Buick asked "Why settle for less when the California GS, built especially for YOU, costs no more?" Exclusively designed for Golden State motorists, Buick advertised the car nationally as a high performance family sports car at an economy car price. Though the car was not included in Buick's yearly catalog it was shown in a two-page black and white fold out brochure. Custom California GS emblems again graced the rear fenders while GS ornamentation could be found in the grille and sail panels. The drivetrain included Buick's new for '68 350-4 V8 with 10.25:1 compression and Rochester (GM) 4GC Quadrajet four-barrel (four-choke) carburetor, producing 280 hp and 375 lb·ft of torque. The two-speed Super Turbine 300 transmission (driving a 3.23:1 rear axle gear, designed for highway cruising) and bench seat interior were again the only choices. Buick also added chrome plated wheels and air cleaner lid to the two-door thin pillar coupe. Tires were 7.75 in (197 mm) on 14 in (36 cm) rims.

1969 was the last year of production for the California GS. The car was for the first time featured in Buick's big brochure. A two-page color picture of the thin pillar coupe and pictures of the again standard bench seat interior were included along with equipment descriptions. Tom McCahill tested the car and recorded a 0–60 mph time of 9.5 seconds and a top speed of 110 mph. Again the car came with Buick's 280 hp 350-4 engine but now it was mated to the new Turbo 350 transmission. Custom California emblems again graced the rear fenders, and the rear marker lights were plain red without Buick's normal 350 or 400 script. Vinyl tops, as with previous years, were standard fare with the California's distinctive GS logo on the sail panel.

=== Gran Sport 340/350 ===
In 1967 Buick added a 340 cu in (5,572 cc) version, there was the GS 340 and the GS California sub-model, little more than the Skylark hardtop with new badging and trim, The 340 produced 260 hp (194 kW) and 365 lb·ft (495 Nm), and less than 4,000 cars were sold. It was replaced the next year with the GS 350 and similar GS California; these used Buick's 349.3 cu in (5,724 cc) "350" small-block V8 engine. A California 2-door coupe appeared in 1969; total GS sales for the year, not counting the new California coupe, were 12,465 (4,933 GS 350s, 7,532 GS 400s). Sales of the GS 350 for 1970 climbed to 9,948; in addition, 10,148 455 cu in (7.5 L) 2-doors were built. The Gran Sport 350 outlived its big brothers, lasting until V8 Gran Sport production stopped in 1975, replaced by the Gran Sport 231.

=== Gran Sport 400 ===
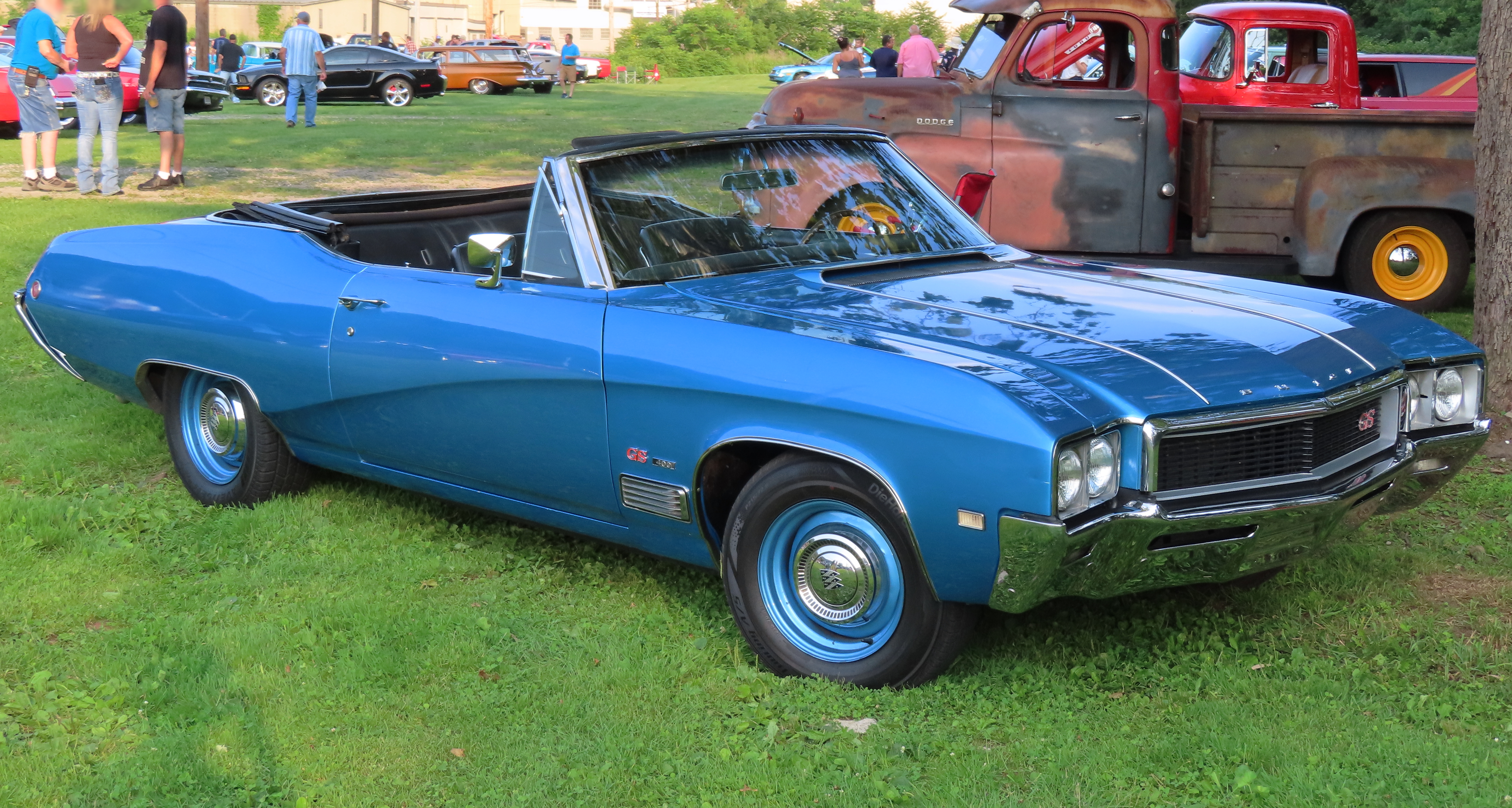
1968 Buick GS 400 Convertible

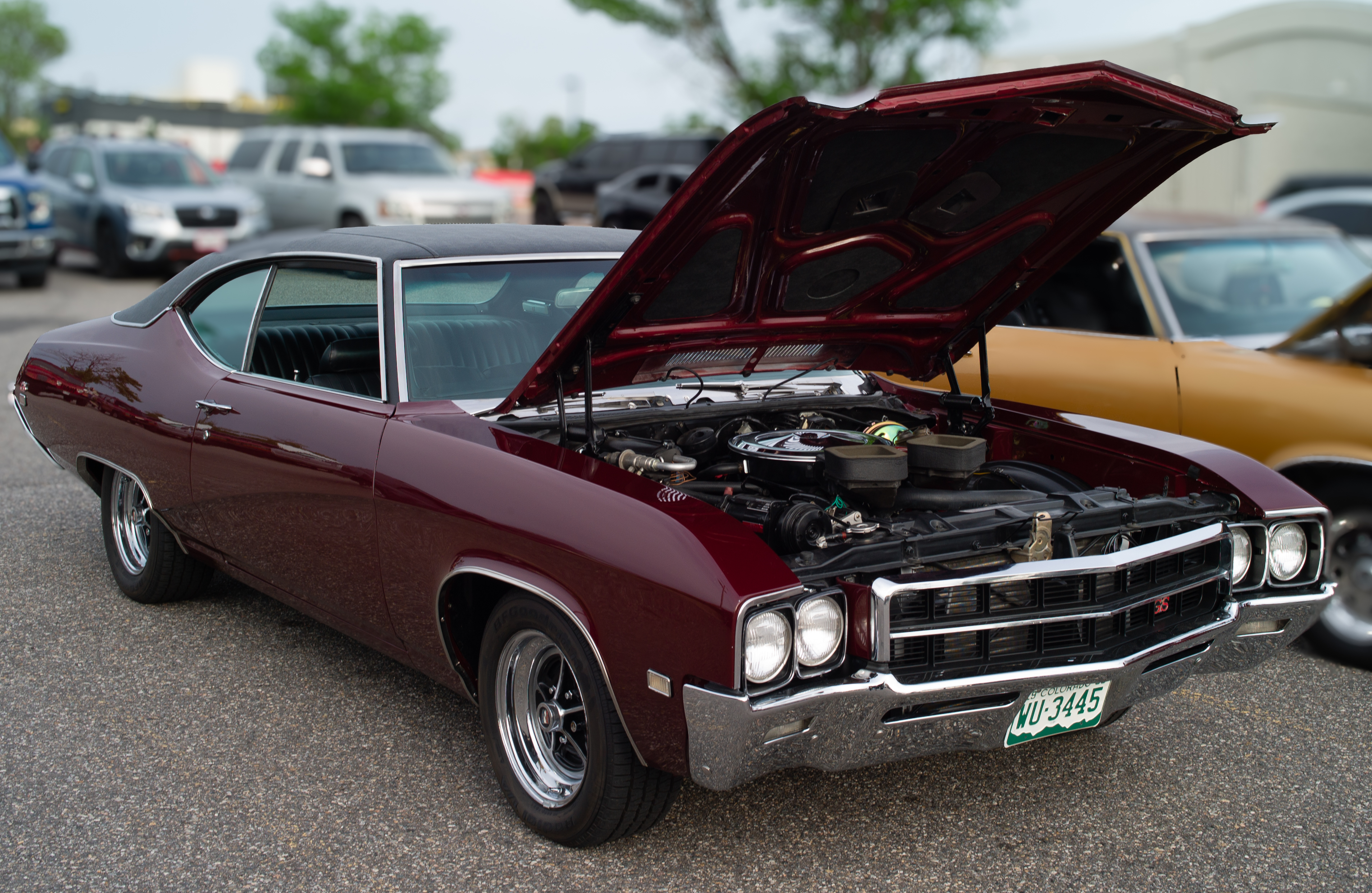
1969 Buick Gran Sport 400 in Maroon Poly

In 1968 and 1969 Buick offered the GS 400 in a convertible and hardtop model. Standard issue of the GS 400 was a 400 cubic inch (6.6 L) engine (with likely lower stated horsepower rating to keep insurance premiums lower) of 340 horsepower (350 hp stage 1 ) and 440 ft. lbs. torque, a four barrel Rochester Quadrajet carburetor, dual exhaust, 2.93 standard gear ratio optional ( limited slip differential, (3.64 stage 1 option, 3.42 with A/C ), and the available three speed turbo Super Turbine 400 automatic transmission (revered as the finest automatic transmission ever built, and commonly called Turbo 400), U-shape Hurst (automatic transmission) shifter and linkage, located on a center console. A 1968 or 1969 GS400 equipped with the TH400 auto transmission was faster off the line than many of its contemporaries thanks to an unusually "low" 1st gear. Shift pattern for the TH400 from most forward position is Park, Reverse, Neutral, Drive, Second, First. A standard three-speed or optional four-speed manual gearbox was also available. Compression ratio on this engine was a moderately high 10.25:1, which allowed for the use of any grade gasoline to be used in normal driving without pinging. The factory air cleaner was covered with a large round chromed cover, secured with a wing nut. The small air scoop behind the hood hinge-line on the 1968 model was generally fake, although it could be functional if ordered with the very rare ram air package. 1969 brought ram air as standard to the GS.

Like all of the GM versions of this body style in this period, the convertible chassis was considerably more robust than the hardtop version. In fact, the convertible chassis was a full box frame chassis that had numerous lightening holes. The hardtop chassis was a 3/4 box frame with no lightening holes. The only GM hardtop ever built with the "Swiss cheese" convertible chassis was the GTO Judge. Same chassis. All of the GS400 convertibles were built at GM's Fremont, California assembly line.

=== Gran Sport 455 ===
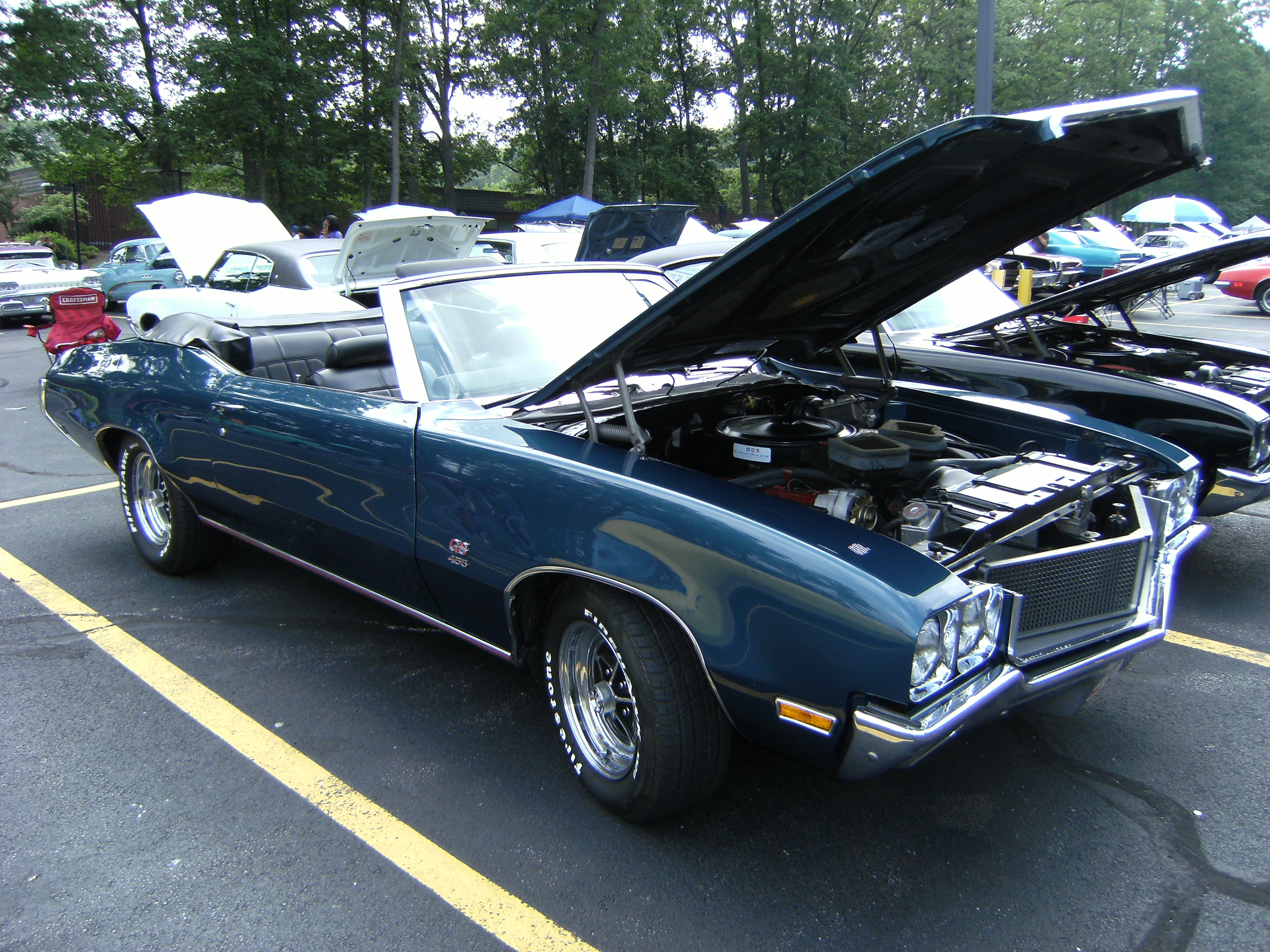
Buick GS 455 convertible

The 400 was replaced for 1970 with the Buick 455 cu in (7.5 L) V8 engine, used in the GS 455. The base model was rated at 350 bhp (355 PS; 261 kW) and 510 lb⋅ft (691 N⋅m; 71 kg⋅m) at 2800 rpm of torque. In the optional Stage 1 trim equipped with a single 4-barrel Rochester Quadrajet carburetor was rated at 360 bhp (365 PS; 268 kW) SAE gross at 4600 rpm and 510 lb⋅ft (691 N⋅m; 71 kg⋅m) of torque at 2800 rpm. As with all American engines produced prior to the 1972 model year, these were SAE gross ratings, which are generally significantly higher than SAE net ratings and are not indicative of what actual production engines produce in their "as installed" condition (with all engine accessories and full exhaust system in place). The fastest magazine test results from this period were obtained by MOTOR TREND Magazine, which managed to extract a 13.38 ET at 105.5 mph from their 3,810 pound GS Stage 1 coupe test car. Using Hale's Trap Speed formula, this result indicated actual "as installed" peak HP of approximately 360 SAE Net (ironically the same as its advertised Gross Figure, meaning this engine was very conservatively rated for that time period).

Dennis Manner, Buick Engine development engineer still recalls the production-line pulled engine dyno test results from 1970 where the lowest HP output of the 15 tested 455 Stage 1 engines was roughly 425 hp.

The December 2004 issue of Musclecar Enthusiast magazine conducted an engine dynamometer test of a freshly rebuilt and well documented 1970 455 Stage 1 (bored .040" over to 464 cubic inches and minus the power-robbing factory engine fan, air cleaner assembly and mufflers). In that condition and with factory timing and carburetor tuning, the engine produced a maximum of 360.9 Gross Horsepower. Optimal carburetor and ignition tuning yielded a peak Gross HP reading of 381.7 HP - again with no engine fan, air cleaner or mufflers in place. While urban legend would have us believe that these engines made "420 HP from the factory," actual empirical results prove otherwise. Although another dynamometer test on a 1970 Skylark GS Stage I showed 471 SAE gross hp, which is more consistent with the engine producing about 360 SAE net hp.

The Stage 1 engine option used cylinder heads that, while using raw castings of the same pattern as all of the other Buick 455s sharing the same model year, were machined differently in order to accept larger valves (2.13" intake and 1.755" exhaust), and to produce smaller compression chambers for increased static compression ratio. The option also included a more aggressive camshaft, a specially tuned 4-barrel Quadrajet carburetor, more aggressive ignition timing,5/8 inch oil pickup tube and a higher numerical final drive, and was available with either Turbo Hydra-matic 400 3-speed automatic transmission, or a Muncie M-21 (not m22) 4-speed manual transmission (although it was later discovered, and confirmed, that one 1970 GS Stage 1 convertible was produced with a 3-speed manual and a standard 3.64:1 Positraction axle ratio). Stage 1 cars equipped with air conditioning received a 3.42 axle ratio.

While powerful in production form, the Buick 455 (including Stage 1) engines had problematic engine blocks. All used 2 bolt main bearing caps; the oiling system was undersized for high-rpm use (including Stage 1 engines) and thin walls in the lifter valleys promoted cracking. The magic of the Stage 1, it would seem, was primarily attributable to its advanced (for the period) cylinder heads, stunningly high torque and the relatively high mid-range horsepower they produced.

The upgraded engine option to the 1970 GS 455, the moderately priced Stage 1 package, drew a great amount of attention and controversy in the muscle-car world when in the 1980s it was listed as faster than any of the Chrysler Hemi cars in the original "50 fastest muscle cars" list. This Hemi vs. Stage 1 controversy has prompted several contests to settle the issue; it remains an unsettled matter and has been a great boon to car magazine sales over the years.

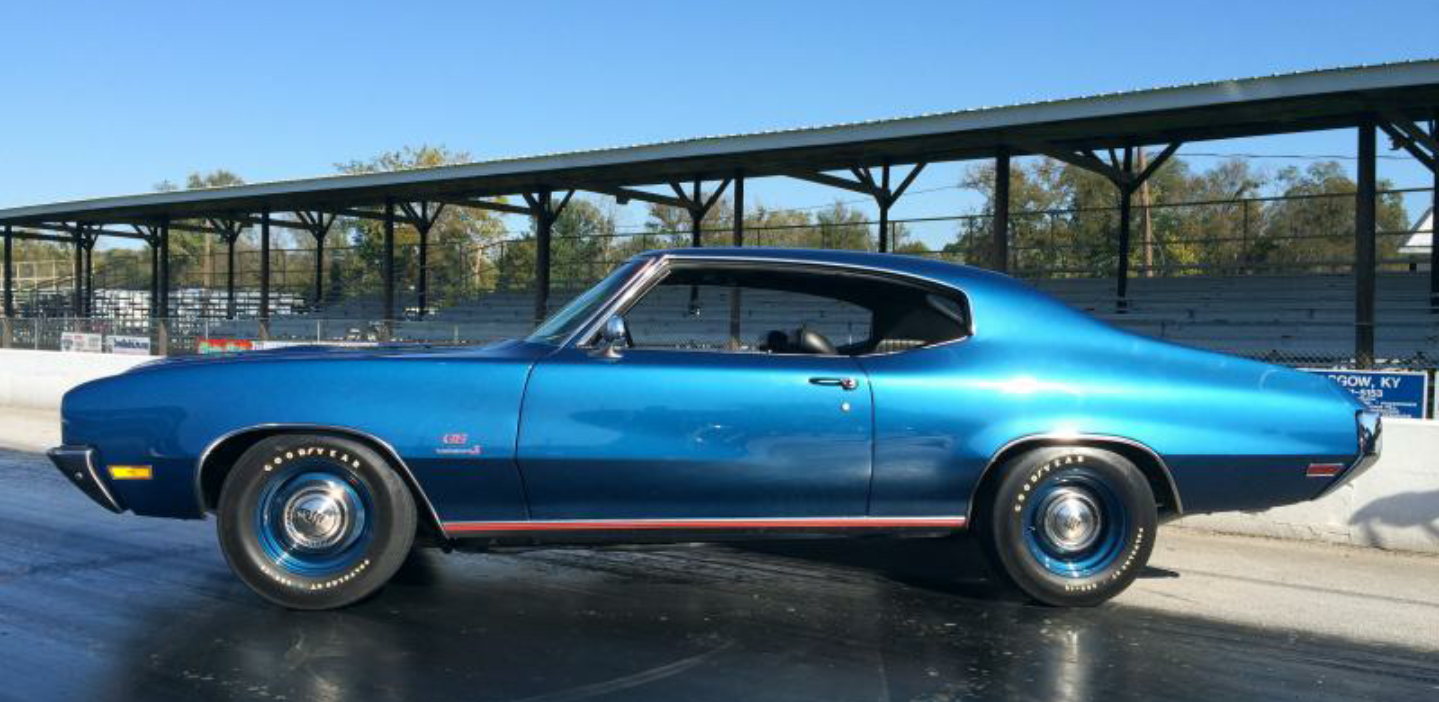
Rare Buick Gran Sport Stage 2

There was also a rare “Stage 2” option produced. This was a dealer-installed package (known as a "dealer option"), first offered in 1969. It included a cam, headers, intake manifold, high compression forged pistons, hollow pushrods, and some calibration changes to the ignition and carburetor. In 1970 the Stage 2 package was designed for the 455 and included special round exhaust port Stage 2 heads, matching Kustom brand headers, a radical cam, high compression forged pistons, Edelbrock B4B aluminum intake, Holley carburetor #4781 850 cfm, and other equipment for racing. Few Stage 2s even exist and Buick only ever factory assembled 1 Stage 2 test unit, it was a factory GSX clone test mule with 4-speed manual transmission used for speed testing. That GSX test mule was equipped with 4.78 gearing and was driven on the streets and tracks on the West Coast. The Stage 2 package's existence was not made public until 1972 when the Stage 2 parts could be ordered in any combination. There is little documentation about any Stage 2 cars that were sold. Three are known to exist and all three of these cars were built as Stage 1 cars at the factory. One was owned by Kenne-Bell a factory backed Buick high performance specialist based in California, sponsored by Reynolds Buick. This car was used as a test car in the development of the Stage 2 components in conjunction with Buick engineering. The second Stage 2 was known as the Jones-Benisek car. The Jones/Benisek car is known to have been delivered as a Stage 1 car. The Stage 2 hood and scoop was added later. The Stage 2 iron heads were purchased by the owner at a local Buick Dealer. The car had a very successful drag racing career with many wins and some world records also. The third Stage 2 is known as Wiley Coyote and as the Turner car. It was originally owned by Bob Thetford and campaigned as "Wiley Coyote" in the NHRA. Sponsored by Kenne-Bell and Dunn Buick in Oklahoma City, Oklahoma. Later it was owned by Jim Turner and was very successful in NMCA winning 5 National Records.

Output and sales for the assembly-line cars were down after 1970 largely due to reduced engine compression ratios and a change from gross to net horsepower ratings. In later years, air quality regulations further limited the power in part due to the addition of catalytic converters and single exhaust pipes. However, Stage 2 parts were available over the Buick parts counter although the Stage 2 heads were discontinued after about 75 sets were produced. The discontinuation was due to porosity problems with castings. The discontinuation of the Stage 2 also was due to the ever-tightening emission standards which resulted in lower performance.

=== GSX ===
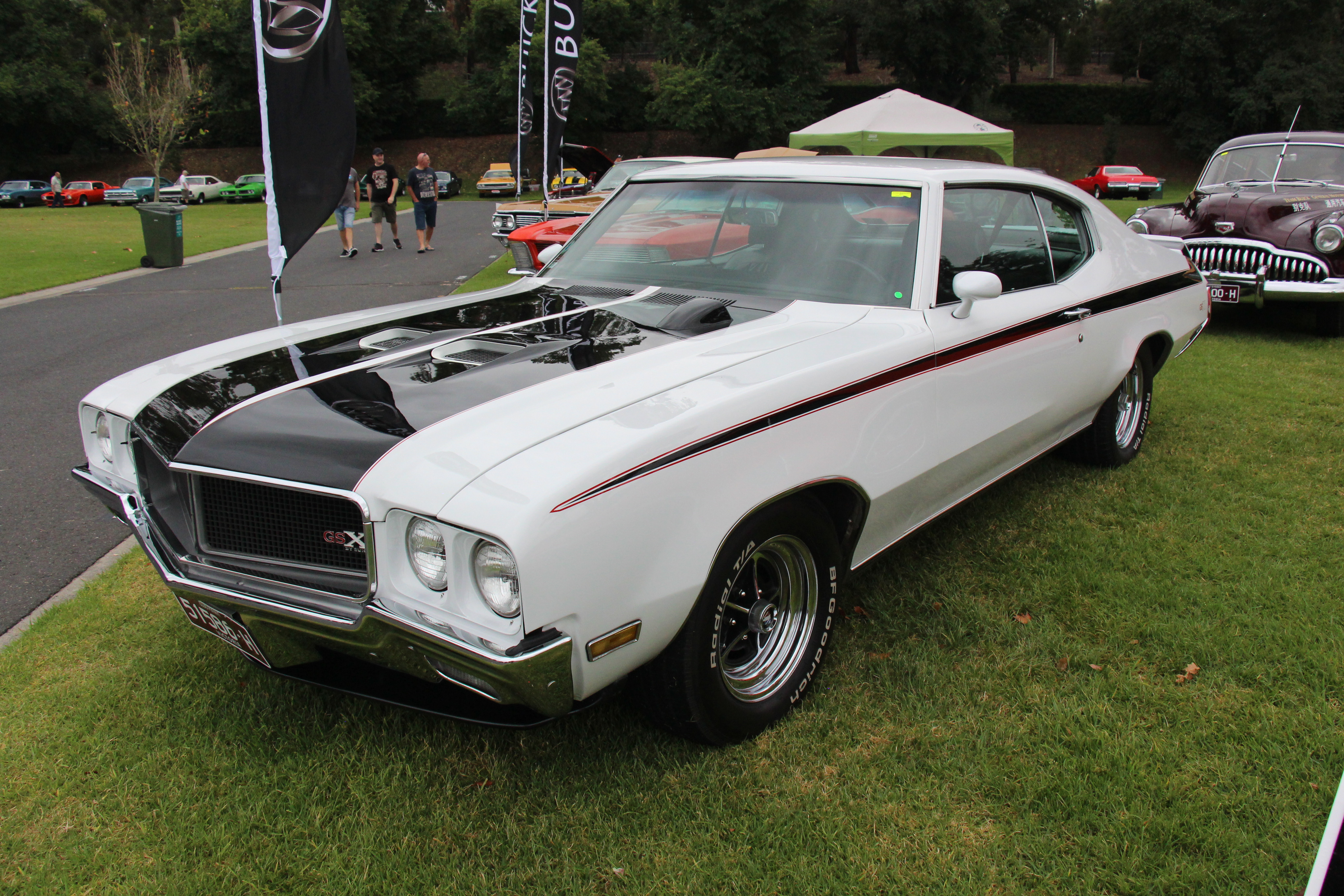
1970 GSX 455 Stage 1 in Apollo white

GSX / GSX Stage 1 was Buick's contribution to the Classic era American Muscle car list, based on the GS455 which was in turn based on the Skylark platform adding an appearance, performance and handling package available starting in the 1970 model year. The GSX Performance and Handling package was a $1,100 option on the GS455 ($9,120 in 2025 dollars) in addition to the listed retail price of $3,098 ($25,684 in 2025 dollars) for the Buick Gran Sport which the GSX was based. The GSX was Buick's attempt to increase showroom traffic on a newly designed Skylark body style for 1970 which started off slow but sales improved. The GSX was Buick's answer to Pontiac's GTO Judge, Oldsmobile's 4-4-2 W-30, and Chevrolet's Chevelle SS. Buick advertised it as "A Brand New Brand Of Buick" and "Another 'Light Your Fire' Car From Buick". It came standard with a 455ci engine with or without the optional Stage 1 performance engine upgrades during the first year of release. Although near the top of GM's brand hierarchy, the GSX hardtop's basic bodyshell was the same as the lower-priced 1970 Chevrolet Chevelle but with differing guards, grille, bumpers, doors, etc., while Pontiac and Oldsmobile midsize hardtop coupes shared a slightly different body.

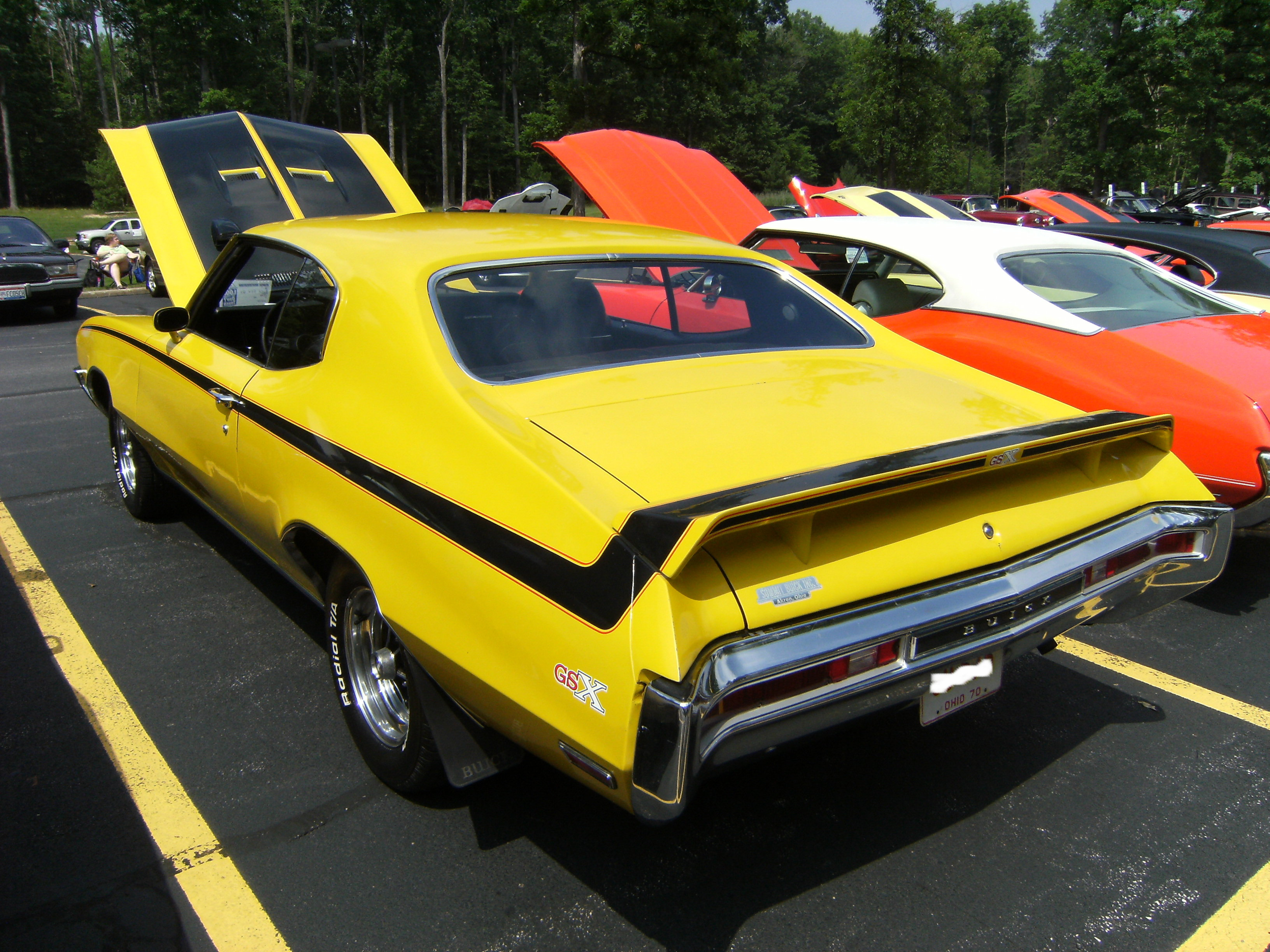
In Saturn Yellow

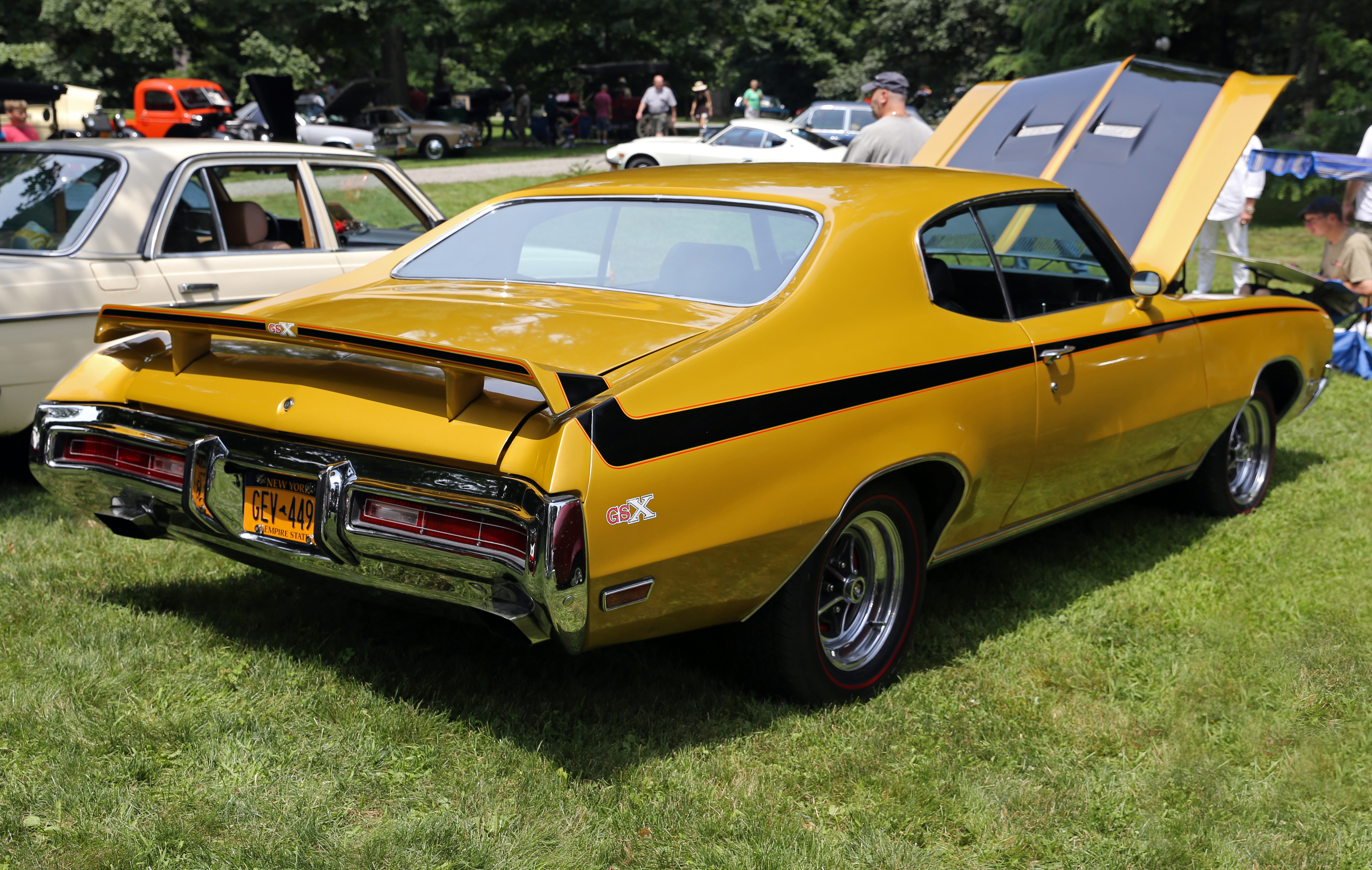
'71 GSX rear view in Poughkeepsie, New York

Due to the late introduction of the GSX, a very special prototype was displayed at the Chicago Motor Show in February 1970 to test consumer reaction. This particular GSX had Mother Of Pearl white paint, a special fiberglass/steel ram air hood with unique modified hood scoops, one-off 3 piece rear spoiler and a prototype front spoiler, custom multicolored leather interior featuring checkerboard black and white X patterned seats and door panels. It became a hit and production started with the factory GSX looking slightly different than the prototype GSX. The GSX did not appear in the standard model catalog for 1970, however a GSX pamphlet was made available to the public. A four-page, full size pamphlet announced the GSX with artist drawn pictures and specifications. Only 678 GSXs were produced in the second half of the 1970 model year beginning in March 1970. and ending in May 1970. Just 278 were equipped with the standard 455, a further 400 purchasers selected the optional Stage 1 performance package. The impressive performance is partly due to the light weight of the 455 which is roughly 150 lb (68 kg) less than the Chrysler 426 Hemi or Chevrolet 454. At 510 lb⋅ft (691 N⋅m) the Buick 455 produced the highest torque output of any American production performance car until 2003 when the potent Dodge Viper made the GSX to lose its title. Every single 1970 GSX Stage 1 produced received a list of performance and handling parts. It was arguably the most radical muscle car Buick ever produced.

In 1970, the GSX option was available in only two colors: 187 in Saturn Yellow and the remaining 491 in Apollo White and always with the 455 cu in (7.46 L) stump-puller and black interior. Power output was rated between 350 to 360 hp (261 to 268 kW). In 1971 and 1972 6 other colors were available for the GSX. All GSXs had the distinctive full body length black stripe that crossed over the standard equipment rear spoiler and was outlined in red pin stripes. A large area of the hood was also black with a hood mounted tachometer (Buick engineers disliked the hood tachometer because it was a Pontiac part) and black front spoiler. Also standard equipment were black bucket seats, floor shifter, wide oval tires, quick ratio steering and anti-sway bars front and rear and quad-link suspension attached to a limited-slip rear differential. Some other options were automatic transmission or four speed manual, A/C or Non-A/C. Restored matching numbers versions have sold in Barrett-Jackson's and Mecum auctions for as much as $173,250.

During 1971 and 1972, the GSX package became an option that was available on any Gran Sport. Production dropped in 1971 to only 124, and again to 44 in 1972. These numbers include the available 350-4 bbl option, the standard 455, and the Stage 1 engines. Many GSXs survive to this day and can be seen at the Buick Gran Sport Nationals held annually in Bowling Green, KY in the middle of May (for the past number of years this time had been changed to September because of weather concerns) along with many other examples of '60s, '70s and '80s Buick performance models. Another Buick event is the Buick Performance Group Nationals which is held at National Trail Raceway in Columbus, Ohio early during the month of August each year.

== Other Gran Sports ==
=== Riviera GS ===
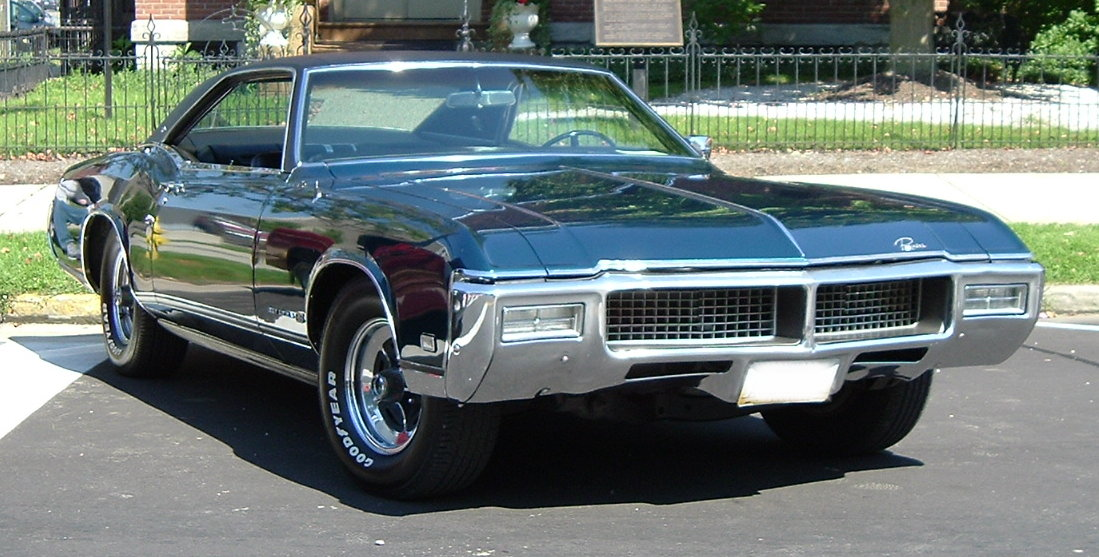
1968 Riviera GS

The Riviera Gran Sport was a high-performance luxury version of the Buick Riviera, produced from 1965 through 1975.

In 1965, it was called Riviera Gran Sport and the later models were still officially called Gran Sport but showed GS badges instead of Gran Sport. Unlike the mid-size GS models, the Riviera and Wildcat GS package included a standard 3.42 positraction rear axle until 1973. The 1965 (and optional in 1966) Riviera Gran Sport also came with a 425 cubic "Super Wildcat" engine, with dual carbs and dual snorkel chrome air cleaner. You could add H2 option (Ride and handling package) for even better road handling. Shorter gear ratio for steering, 1 inch lower suspension.

=== Wildcat GS ===
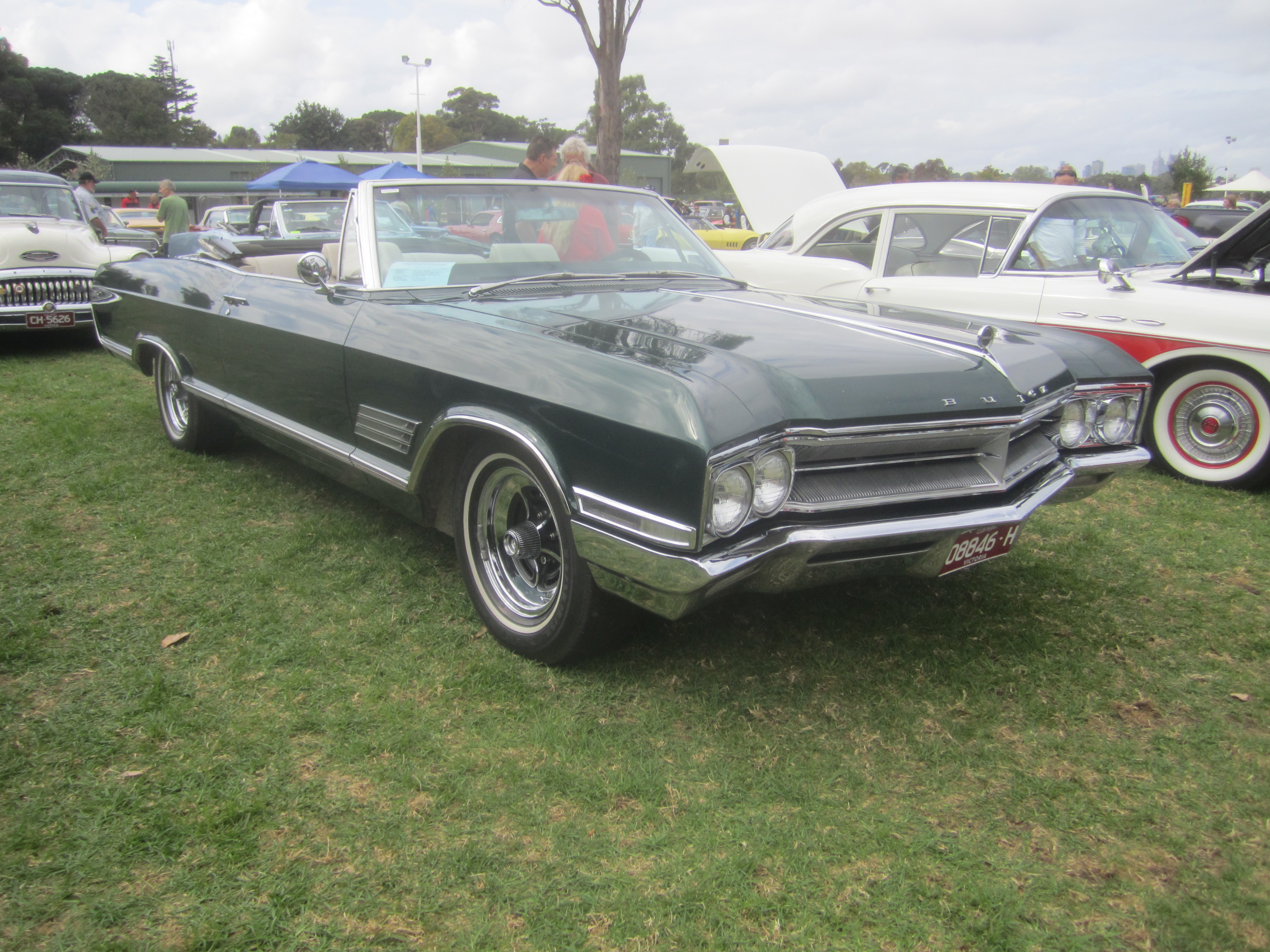
1966 Buick Wildcat GS convertible

Another GS option package was available on the Buick Wildcat and Wildcat Custom, hardtop and convertible. The GS package included a 3.42 ratio posi rear, variable rate suspension springs, quick ratio steering box, heavy duty sway bars, and a switch-pitch Turbo Hydra-matic 400 transmission. The addition of the Y48 option gave the purchaser a pair of Carter AFB four barrel carburetors, and finned aluminum valve covers on the 425 nailhead engine. This was a one-year only option, existing in 1966 only. The Y48 option was delivered in the trunk and installed by the dealer.

=== Century GS / Century GS Stage 1 ===
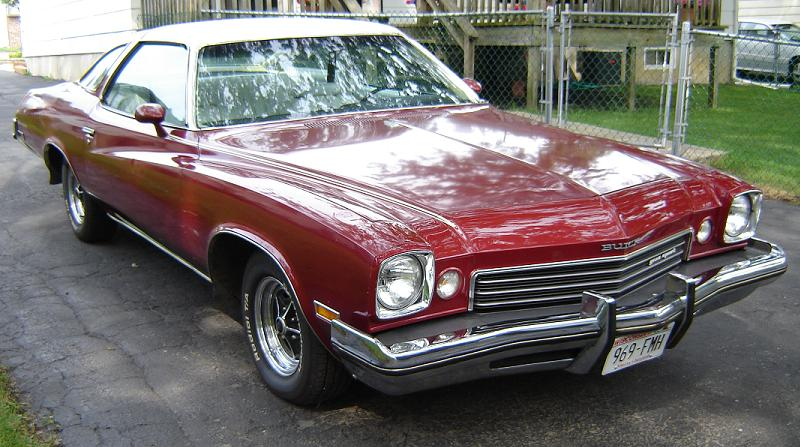
1973 Buick Century GS

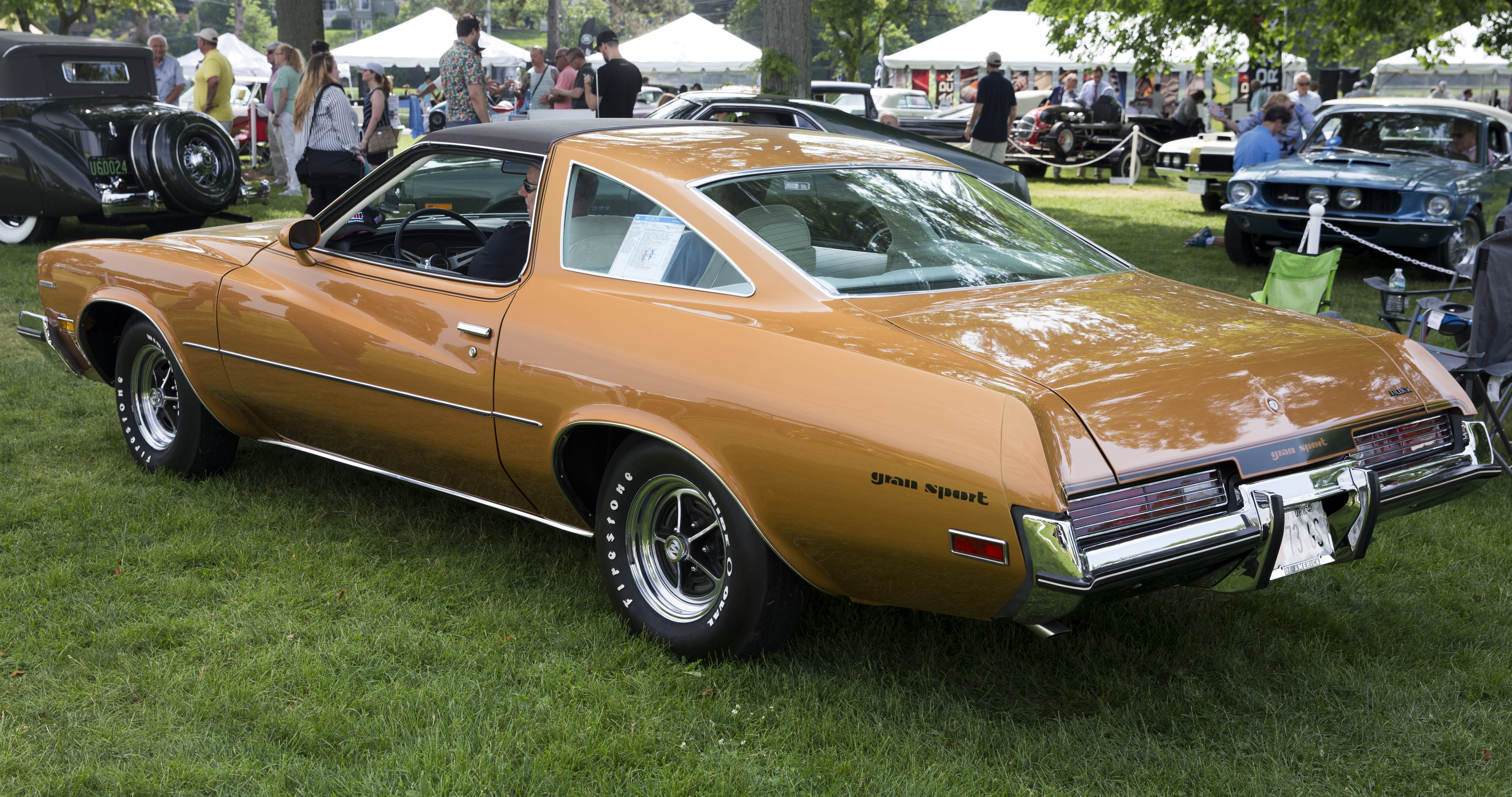
1973 Buick Century GS

In 1973–75 and in 1986, there was a Century Gran Sport. For 1973, Buick renamed its intermediate line from Skylark to Century, a nameplate previously used on Buick's full-sized performance cars from 1936 to 1942 and 1954 to 1958. Like all GM intermediates, the 1973 Century received new Colonnade styling, which amounted to pillared hardtop sedans, coupes and station wagons - each of which utilized frameless windows along with fixed rear side windows, and convertibles were discontinued. on third generation Buick Century the GS name badge became the "Gran Sport" and was now an option package on the semi-fastback Century Colonnade coupes. The "Gran Sport" option included decals on the rear fenders and trunk lid reading "gran sport" along with suspension and appearance upgrades.

The standard engine was a 150-horsepower 350 two-barrel V8, which was the standard engine for all Centurys. In addition to the 175-horsepower 350 four-barrel V8 (with single exhaust), the 190-horsepower 350 four-barrel V8 (with dual exhaust) was available only on the Gran Sport. Two 455 cubic-inch V8s were available including the 250-horsepower four-barrel and the Stage 1 four-barrel rated at 270 horsepower (both with dual exhaust) - all net figures and similar to the 1972 models. In 1973 only 979 Century Gran sport 455 and 728 Century Gran sport 455 Stage 1 models were assembled, For 350 engines there was 3 transmissions available, 3 speed manual or 4 speed M21 manual and Turbo Hydra-matic 350 Automatic and for 455 engines only M21 four speed manual and Automatic Turbo Hydra-matic 400 transmission.

The 1974 Century "gran sport" received exterior and interior trim changes. The same selection of engines was carried over from 1973 including the 350 four-barrel, 455 four-barrel and the 455 Stage 1 four-barrel (the 455s downrated to 245 and 255 net horsepower respectively). In this Year 455 stage 1 was one of first GM cars that receive High energy ignition distributor. Like 1973 model year for 350 engines there was 3 speed manual or 4 speed M21 manual and Turbo Hydra-matic 350 Automatic and for 455 engines M21 four speed manual and Automatic Turbo Hydra-matic 400 transmission. Radial tires were a new option for 1974 along with reclining Strato bucket seats. In 1974 only 579 Century Gran sport 455 and 478 Century Gran sport 455 Stage 1 models were assembled.

For 1975, the Century GS, or "gran sport" entered its third and final year on the Colonnade body. It was reduced to a mere appearance/handling package as the 455/Stage 1 options were discontinued and Buick's revived 231 cubic-inch V6 was the standard engine, mated to a standard three-speed manual transmission or optional Turbo Hydra-matic. The only optional engines were two 350 V8s, a two-barrel 155 horsepower version or the four-barrel option rated at 175 horsepower and offered only with the Turbo Hydra-matic. Both engines were also mated to catalytic converters for the first time this year, which mandated the use of unleaded gasoline and precluded the availability of true dual exhaust systems. Radial tires were now standard equipment and the Strato bucket seat option reverted to the non-reclining version.

Production Figures:

Buick Century Gran Sport Production Figures:
	231	350	455	Stage1	Yearly Total
1973	N/A	4,930	979	728	6,637
1974	N/A	2,298	579	478	3,355
1975	#	#	N/A	N/A	1,288
Total	#	#	1,558	1,206	11,280

Both the Century GS and the larger Riviera GS (which also had been continually produced since 1965) were discontinued after the 1975 model year due to sagging sales for high-performance cars following the 1973–74 energy crisis and subsequent trends toward smaller and more fuel-efficient cars. Performance versions of the Century (and its companion Regal line) and Riviera would return in the late 1970s with the advent of Buick's turbocharged 231 V6 introduced in 1978 on the Century/Regal intermediates and the full-sized LeSabre Sport Coupe and then the newly introduced front drive Riviera in 1979 for the "S-Type" which later became the T-Type, a moniker that would ultimately replace the GS badge for sporty/performance Buicks in the early 1980s.

The Century GS model returned in 1986 for what was now Buick's front-drive intermediate-sized car (Regal continued as a coupe on the 1978-vintage rear-drive G-body until 1987). The GS was only offered as a two-door coupe and was powered by a fuel-injected 3.8 liter (231 cubic-inch) V6 mated to a four-speed overdrive automatic transmission but with far less horsepower than the rear-drive Regal GN's turbocharged/intercooled version rated at 245 horsepower. This Century GS was a one-year-only offering in 1986 sold alongside the Century T-Type coupe and sedan.

=== Apollo GSX ===
In 1974, the GSX consisted of a trim package on Buick's small, X-bodied Apollo. Three engines were available on the 1974 GSX: the Chevrolet supplied 250 6-cyl., and two Buick engines:the 350 2 barrel and 350 4 barrel versions.

=== Regal GS / Regal GSX ===
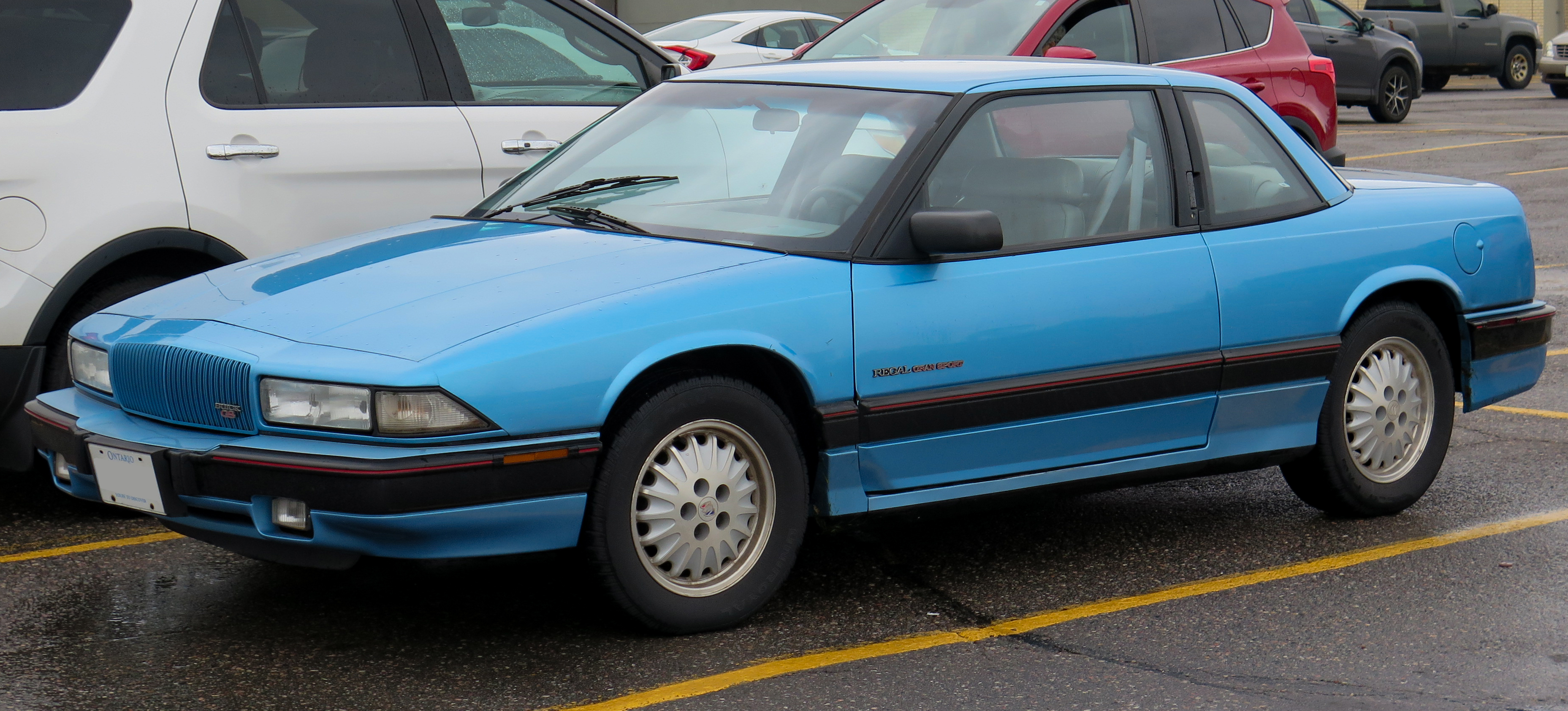
1992 Buick Regal GS coupe

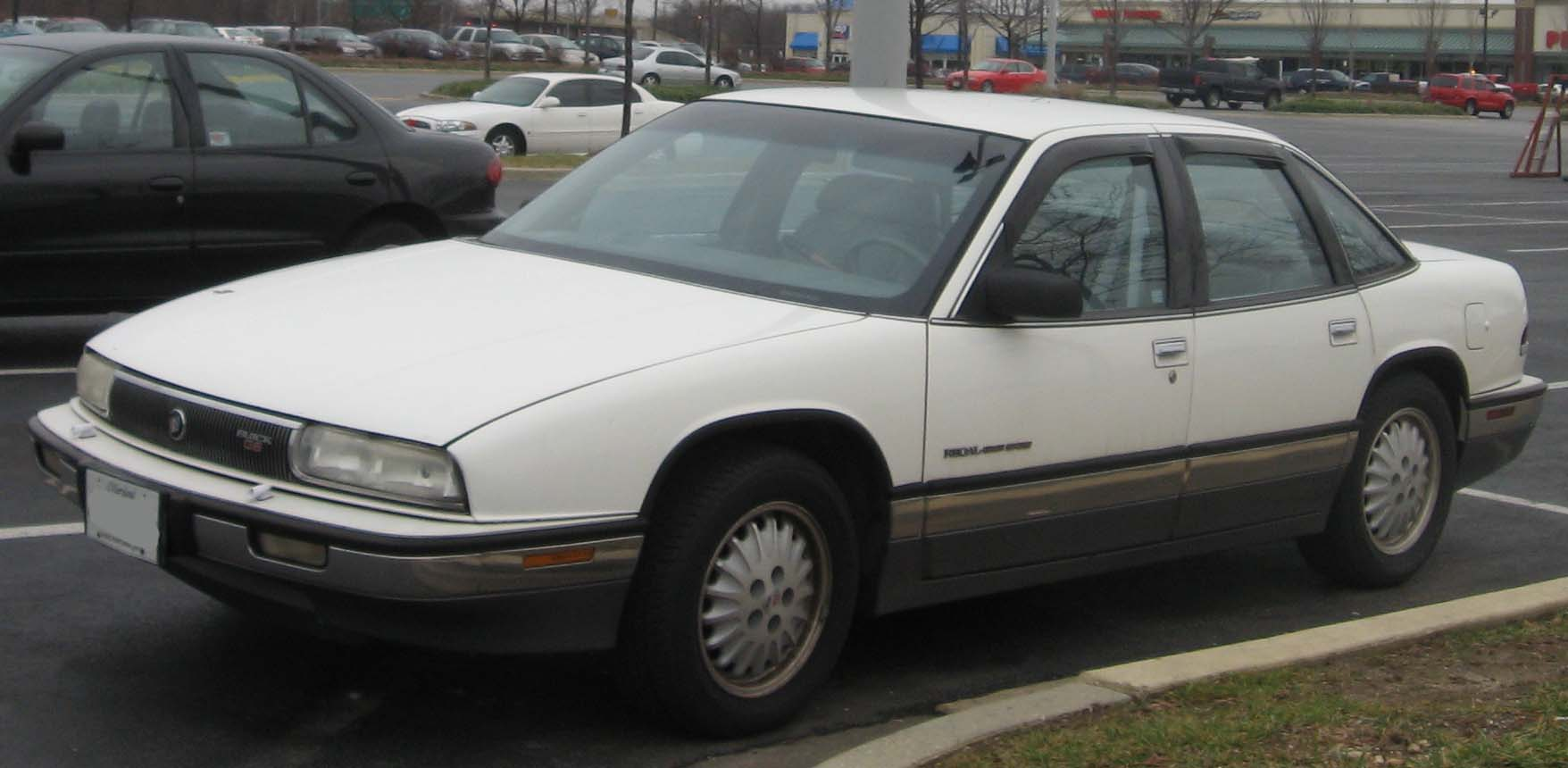
1990-1993 Buick Regal GS sedan

From 1988 to 2004 and 2010 to present There is Buick Regal GS and Gran Sport models. For third Generations Buick Regal there was a Gran Sport version model. The Gran Sport option generally contained the following items:

- Leather bucket seats and center console
- Black, wide, body side moldings (coupe only)
- Gran Touring (FE3) suspension - which included faster power steering, and revised springs and struts
- Front air dam and aero rocker panels (coupe only)
- 16 inch aluminum wheels
- Fog lamps
- Two tone paint (sedan only)
- Leather steering wheel

Beginning in late 1990, the 3.8L (231 cu in) Series I V6 producing 170 horsepower (130 kW) was available. For 1996, this was updated to the Series II V6 with 205 horsepower (153 kW). The 1997–2004 body style featured a 240 horsepower (179 kW) 3.8L Series II supercharged V6.

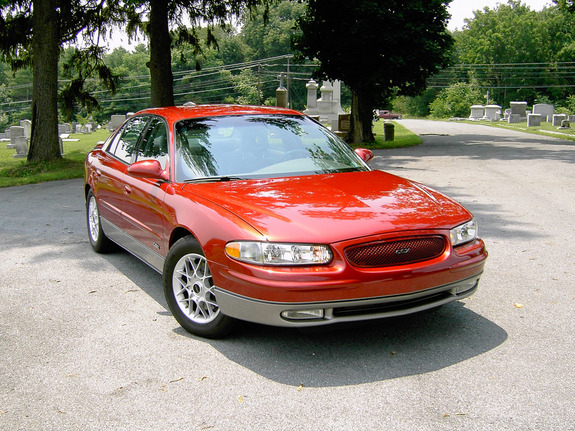
1997–2004 Buick Regal GSX sedan

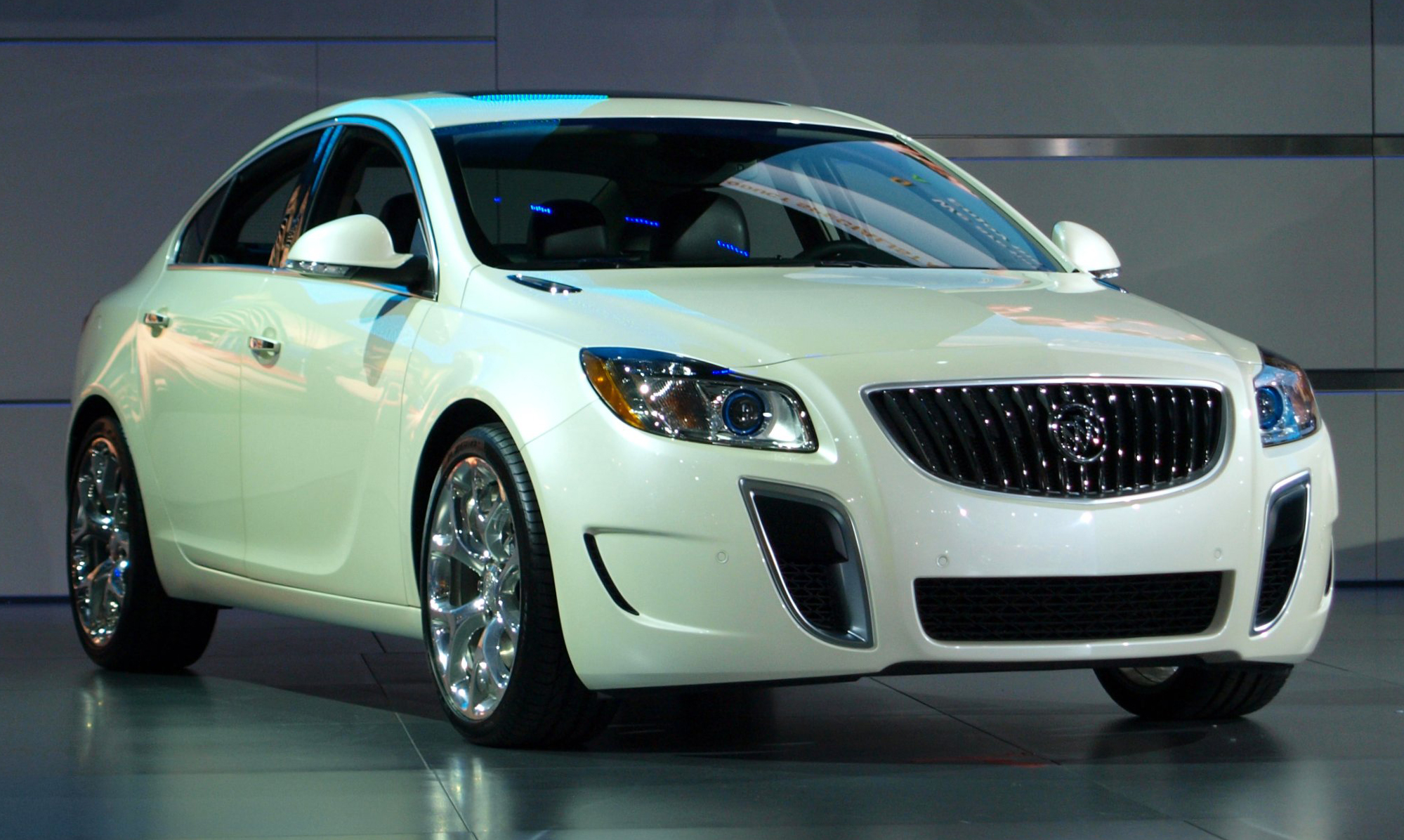
2008–2017 Buick Regal GS sedan

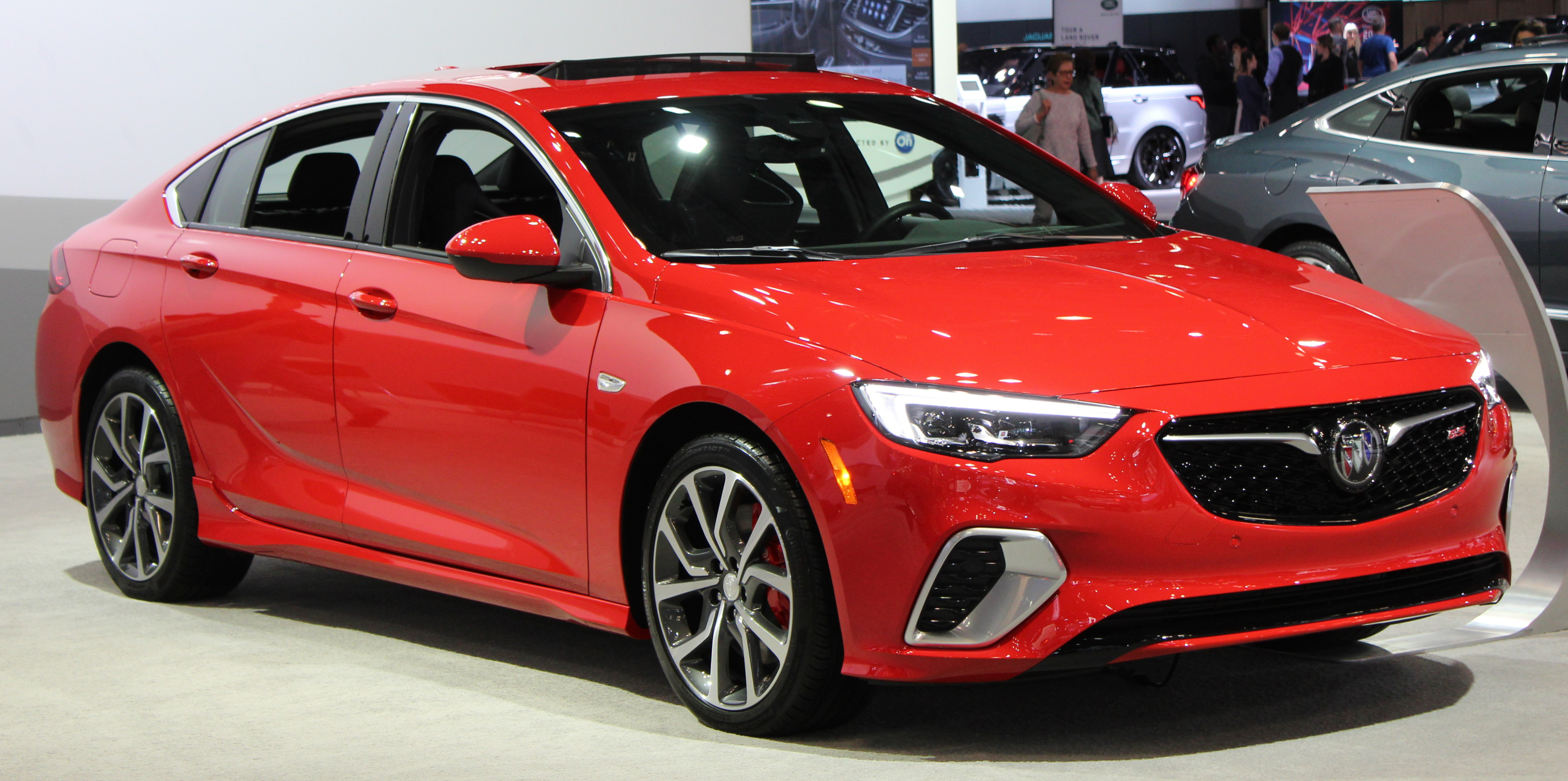
2018–2020 Buick Regal GS sedan

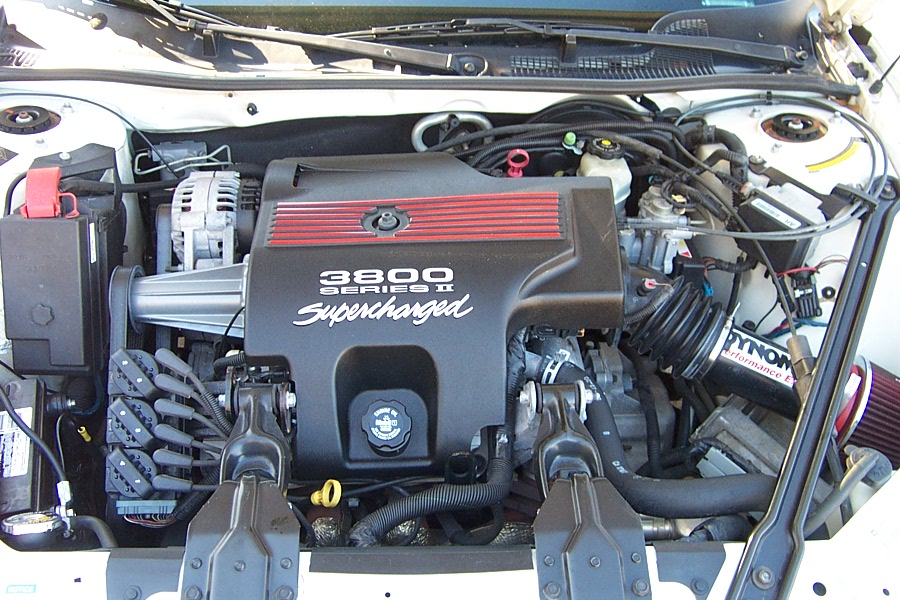
The 3800 Series II L67 Supercharged engine in a 1998 GS

For 4th Generation Buick Regal The 3.8 liter V6 supercharged Regal GS had a 1/4 mile ET of 14.9 seconds, and acceleration to 60 mph (97 km/h) took 6.7 seconds. The Regal GS, equipped with the supercharged 3.8 liter V6 engine (L67) produced 240 hp (179 kW) and 280 lb⋅ft (380 N⋅m) of torque. The Regal GS's PCM has programming that activates torque management to reduce wheel spin at launch. Regal GS was EPA rated at 18/27 MPG city/freeway. In the 2003 and 2004 model years, Buick, in collaboration with SLP Performance, came out with the Buick Regal GSX. They offered dealer-installed options and dealer supplied accessories for GS models. Like the GS Buicks that came before it, the SLP GSX came in three power train packages, referred to as stages. The Stage 1 package added 10 horsepower with the addition of a dual stainless steel cat-back exhaust system and free-flowing cold air induction system. For the Stage 2 package, a Hypertech Power Programmer with an SLP custom calibration tune was included with the Stage 1 components good for an extra 20 horsepower. The range-topping Stage 3 package added a 3.5 inch smaller diameter supercharger pulley to crank up the boost. With an advertised 30 more horsepower than stock, the Stage 3 GSX was conservatively rated at 270 horsepower and 312 pound-feet of torque. Since the parts were available from SLP over the counter for many years, there have been quite a few Regal GS sedans that have been cloned into a GSX for both appearance and performance purposes. Though the model didn't officially debut until 2003, a licensed SLP dealer could perform the transformation on any Regal GS from 1997 to 2004. A true GSX can be verified from an SLP door jamb label with the correct part number for the kit.

For the 5th generation Buick Regal, the GS version of the Regal was based on the Opel Insignia OPC and the Vauxhall Insignia VXR. This front-wheel drive sedan GS features Buick's Interactive Drive Control System with GS mode, a choice of an FGP Germany F40-6 six-speed manual or Aisin AF-40 (G2) six-speed automatic transmission, high performance brakes with Brembo front calipers and high performance strut (HiPerStrut) front suspension. 19 inch wheels will be standard and 20 inch forged aluminum wheels will be available. The GS is expected to accelerate from zero to 60 miles per hour in under seven seconds. It is equipped with GS-only high-output version of the Ecotec 2.0L turbo engine with 270 hp (201 kW) and 295 lb⋅ft (400 N⋅m) of torque. The GM LHU engine used in the GS trim makes 135 hp per liter.

For the 6th generation Regal, from 2018 Buick released an updated version of the Regal GS. The new Regal is equipped with a GM LGX V6 3.6 producing 310 horsepower paired with a 9-speed automatic transmission yielding acceleration from zero to 60 mph in under six seconds.
