= T series =

T series or T-Series may refer to:

== Technology ==
- Apple T series, a family of processors
- Canon T series, a line of single lens reflex cameras
- Juniper T series, a core router
- Sony Ericsson T series, a series of cell phones
- SPARC T series, a range of multi-core microprocessors made by Sun Microsystems and Oracle
- ThinkPad T series, a line of laptop computers produced by IBM and Lenovo

== Transportation ==
- Rover T-series engine, a 1992–1999 British inline-four petrol engine series
- T series (Toronto subway), a series of subway cars built in the 1990s for Toronto, Ontario, Canada

=== Vehicles ===
- Bentley T-Series, a 1965–1980 British luxury car series
- FTE T-Series, a 1998–2002 Australian performance car lineup based on the Ford Falcon
- Scania T-series, a 2004–2005 Swedish truck series
- Suzuki T series, a 1963–1977 Japanese motorcycle series
- Isuzu D-Max, a 2002–present Japanese mid-size pickup truck, sold in Egypt as the Chevrolet T-Series
- Ford Transit, a British van known as the T-Series in the United States

== Other uses ==
- T-Series (company), an Indian record label and film production company

== See also ==
- T class (disambiguation)
- T-type (disambiguation)
