= T-class submarine =

Two classes of submarine are known as the T class:

- The AA-1-class submarine was a series of three experimental submarines of the United States Navy also known as the T class
- The British T-class submarine was a series of 55 submarines of the Royal Navy that served in World War II
