= T-Type =

Sporty model trim level by Buick

- Product type: Performance cars
- Current owner: General Motors
- Produced by: General Motors
- Introduced: 1981
- Discontinued: 1990; 36 years ago
- Related brands: GS
- Markets: U.S.

T-Type is a performance brand used by Buick from 1981 to 1990. Marketed during a hiatus of the Gran Sport branding, T-Type vehicles were the sportiest versions of each Buick model line, similar to Super Sport-branded Chevrolet vehicles. The "T" in T-Type was defined jointly by the use of a turbocharged engine and touring-oriented versions of Buick model lines (as Buick added versions with naturally-aspirated engines).

In addition to handling and performance upgrades, T-Type vehicles were distinguished by exterior styling. Chrome trim was reduced (or blacked out altogether), with some vehicles featuring two-tone paintwork; all T-Type vehicles were fitted with aluminum-alloy wheels. The first T-Type Buick was the 1981 Riviera, with Buick also offering T-Type versions of nearly its entire line, including the Century, Electra, LeSabre, Regal, Skylark, Somerset, and Skyhawk. The only models excluded where the full-size Estate station wagon and the Reatta touring/sports car.

At the end of the 1980s, Buick shifted away from performance-oriented vehicles across its entire line. For 1989, the Gran Sport/GS branding returned as the performance-oriented version of the Buick Regal (remaining as a trim through its second retirement after 2020).

== History ==
The first model marketed with the T-Type (T=Touring) option package was the 1981 Buick Riviera, as Buick renamed its S-Type option package with sportier trim, suspension, and its turbocharged V6 engine. In 1983, multiple models followed; along with the Regal (which also shared its 3.8L turbocharged V6 with the Riviera), Buick introduced T-Type versions of its newest models: the Century, Skylark, and Skyhawk.

The Regal T-Type brought the return of the Regal Grand National, sharing its turbocharged powertrain and exterior trim (though the Grand National was now painted completely black); both form the basis of the 1987 Buick GNX (as of current production, the fastest-accelerating Buick ever produced). In 1984, the reputation of turbocharged Buicks grew when a Grand National defeated a Corvette in a quarter-mile run featuring GM vehicles, thus creating a rare instance of "the fastest American car" that was not made by Chevrolet (despite its 3.8L V6 vs. the 5.7L V8 of the Corvette).

During the 1980s, several additional models received the T-Type package. Following its downsizing, the Electra T-Type was introduced for 1985 (including the rare Electra T-Type coupe). For 1986, the Somerset T-Type replaced the Skylark T-Type coupe; the first Skylark T-Type sedan was introduced for 1987. For 1987, the LeSabre T-Type replaced the LeSabre Grand National.

At the end of the 1980s, Buick began to phase the T-Type options out of its product lines. In 1987, the stand-alone T-Type option package was dropped in favor of several free-standing options featuring the upgraded performance features, exterior, and interior trim separately.

T-Type interiors typically featured front bucket seats, with center console-mounted shifter, though 1981-1985 Rivieras featured bucket seats, a small console and column shifter. T-Type Electras and Centurys also retained a column shifter with bucket seats and a center console (as a front bench seat was technically standard). The T-Type logo consisted of a large red letter "T", and the word "Type" in small black or white letters. The emblems were only placed on the fenders and on some later models (1986) a grille emblem was used. The single T was only used on the turbo Regals and only in 1987.

== Riviera T-Type (1981–1988) ==
Introduced for 1981, the Riviera T-Type served as the replacement for the 1979–1980 Riviera S-Type.

=== 1981–1985 ===
Featuring the turbocharged 3.8L V6 from the Regal, the T-Type was intended as a sportier version of the model line, fitted with sportier front seats, Grand Touring suspension, aluminum wheels, and black exterior trim (including side mirrors). Though not offered with the convertible (introduced 1982), the T-Type was initially offered with all four engines of the model line (except the 5.7 L diesel V8).

After dropping its V8 option in 1983, the Riviera T-Type offered only the turbocharged 3.8 L V6 for 1984. A 1984 upgrade brought a retuned suspension, an LED tachometer and a turbo boost gauge, and additional black trim. For 1985, the T-Type was largely carryover, becoming the only version of the model line using a V6 engine.

=== 1986–1988 ===
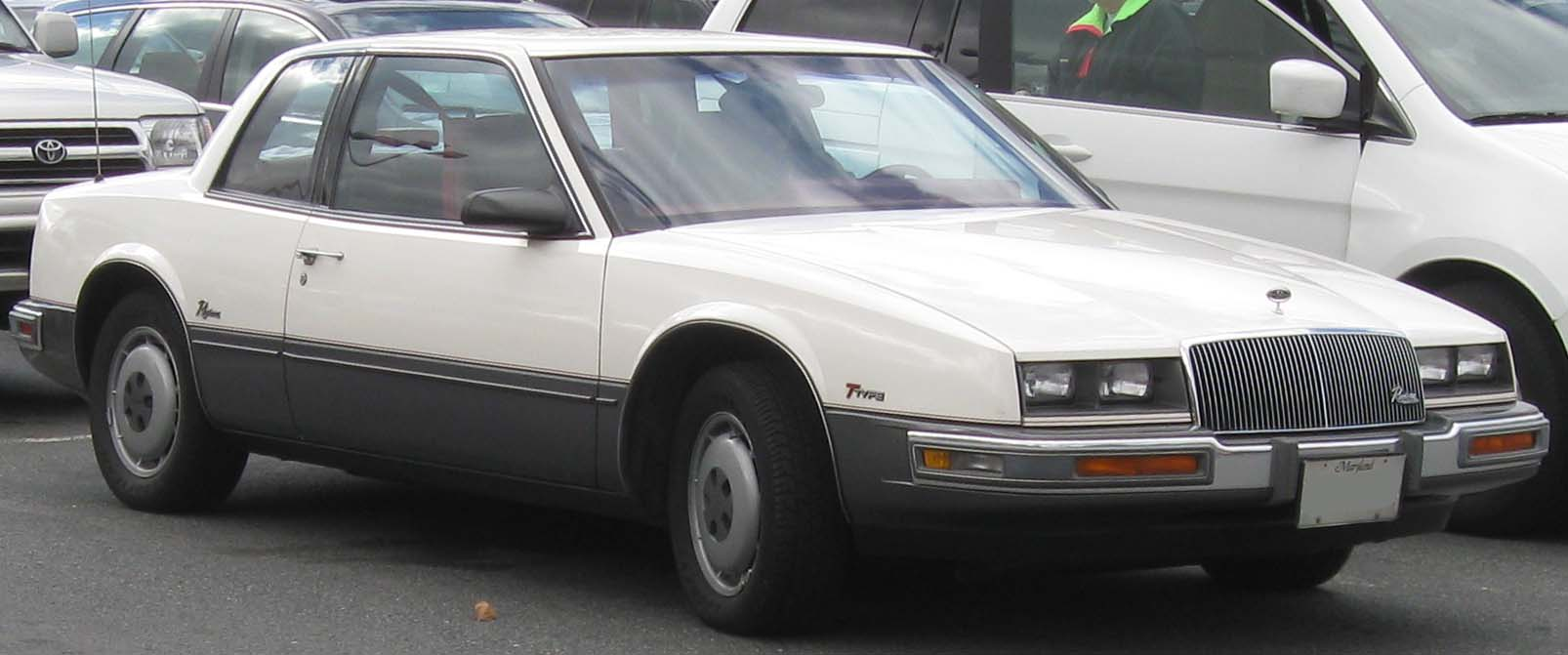
1986–1988 Riviera T-Type

For 1986, the T-Type option package returned for the seventh-generation Riviera. In a major change, the turbocharged V6 was dropped, with the T-Type using the 140 hp 3.8 L V6 of the standard Riviera. The T-Type underwent several chassis upgrades over the standard version, including Gran Touring suspension, larger 15-inch aluminum wheels, and upgraded seat and interior trim, along with a standard Graphic Control Center dashboard CRT touchscreen. For 1987, the T-Type became more visibly distinguished, receiving a standard two-tone exterior (with all versions using a silver lower body). For 1988, the T-Type shared its primary changes with the rest of the model line; composite-style headlamps were added, alongside the introduction of the 3800 V6.

For its 1989 model revision (adding 11 inches of length to the rear body, with the wheelbase unchanged), the Riviera grew more luxury-oriented, dropping both the T-Type and the CRT touchscreen.

== Century T-Type (1983–1986) ==
For 1983, Buick introduced the Century T-Type option, offered for both the two-door and four-door Century. Intended to bridge the gap between the Chevrolet Celebrity Eurosport and the Pontiac 6000STE, the Century T-Type was styled with a dechromed roofline and rear fascia, no hood ornament, and 15-inch aluminum wheels; the T-Type badging was located on the front fenders (relocated from the rear quarter panels). The interior was upgraded with standard bucket seats (upgraded leather seats were an option) and a center console (a floor shifter was optional). For 1983, the 3.0 L V6 was standard, with the 3.8 L V6 replacing it in the T-Type as a running change during 1984.

Following a combined sales of 17,406 units for the design, Buick dropped the Century T-Type for 1987.

=== Century Gran Sport (1986) ===
For 1986, the two-door Century T-Type was dropped, with Buick replacing it with the Century Gran Sport. Fitted with the same suspension and drivetrain as the four-door T-Type, the Century Gran Sport wore an exterior design similar to the Regal Grand National: along with being offered in black, the Gran Sport was completely devoid of brightwork (limited to only its badging and its wheels). In total, 1,029 Century Gran Sports were built.

== Regal T-Type (1983–1987) ==
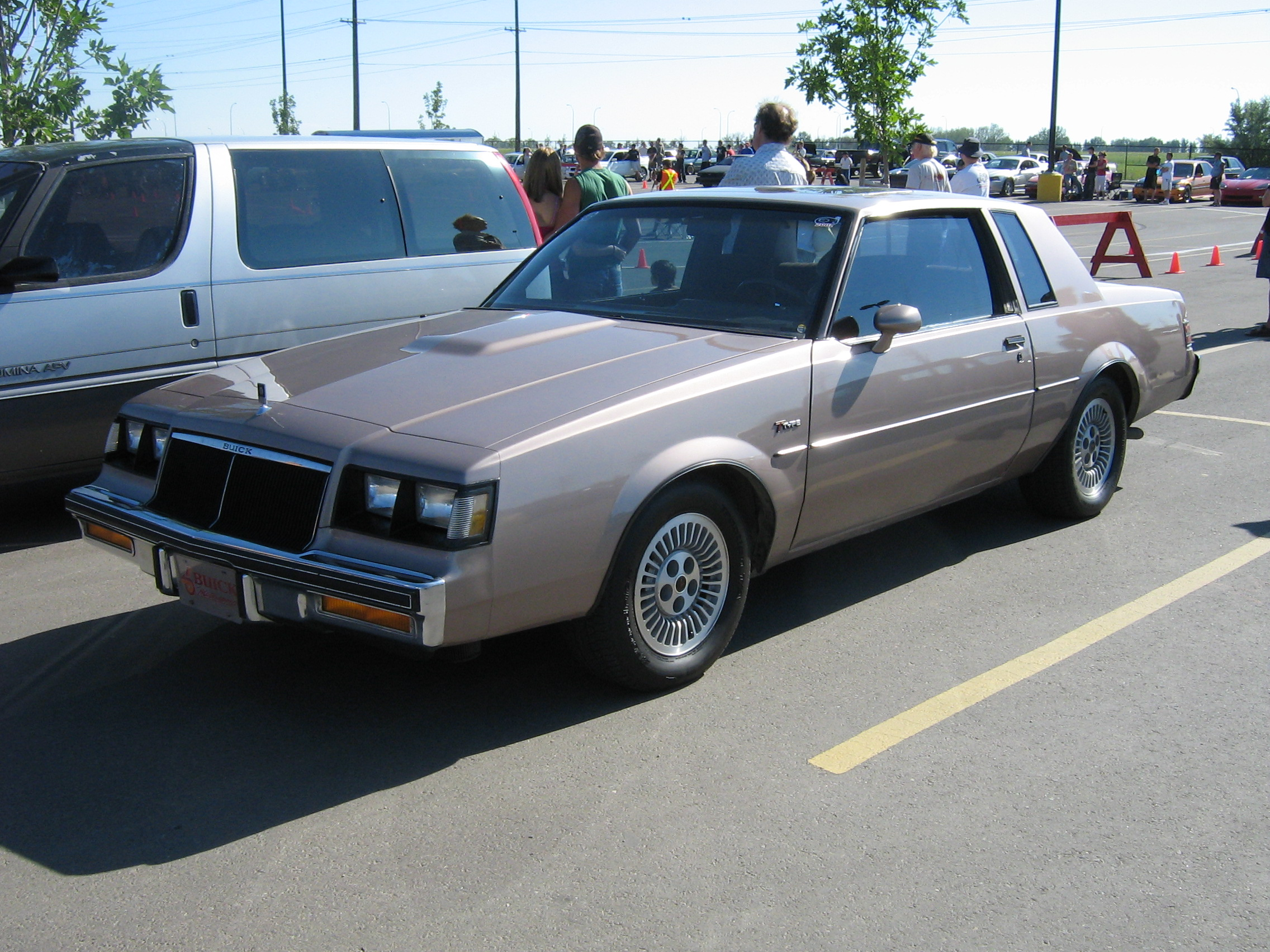
1984 Buick Regal T-Type

For 1983, Buick introduced the Regal T-Type, renaming the turbocharged Regal Sports Coupe sold from 1978-1982. Initially sharing its turbocharged 3.8 L V6 with the Riviera T-Type, the Regal T-Type was styled with its blackout body trim (with the exception of the bumpers and grille); along with model-specific badging, the T-Type was fitted with upgraded chassis tuning and 15-inch alloy wheels. For 1983 only, the Regal T-Type was styled nearly identical to a standard Regal, differing with its 14-inch alloy wheels and two-tone paint. As Chevrolet did not produce a Corvette for 1983, the Regal T-Type was the fastest-accelerating GM car, besting both the Camaro Z28 and Firebird Trans Am.

For 1984, Buick entered full-scale production of the Regal Grand National. Sharing its turbocharged V6 and upgraded chassis tuning with the T-Type, the Grand National was offered only in black (the T-Type was offered in any Regal color), adding an all-black grille and bumpers. Sharing its interior (with specific badging) with the T-Type, the interior was fitted with sport bucket seats, a console with a floor-mounted shifter (optional on the T-Type), and a 3-spoke steering wheel (T-Type, "T" emblem; GN, Buick tri-shield emblem). The T-Type additionally offered the Designer Series option (code WH1), trading a monochromatic appearance for a gray/black two-tone design (similar to the 1982 Grand National prototypes).

For 1985 and 1986, changes to the T-Type were primarily limited to upgrades for the turbocharged V6 (increasing from 200 to 235 hp in 1986). In contrast to the Grand National, the T-Type was fitted with aluminum wheels rather than steel (with the previous aluminum wheels adopted by the T-Type for 1986).

=== 1987 revision ===
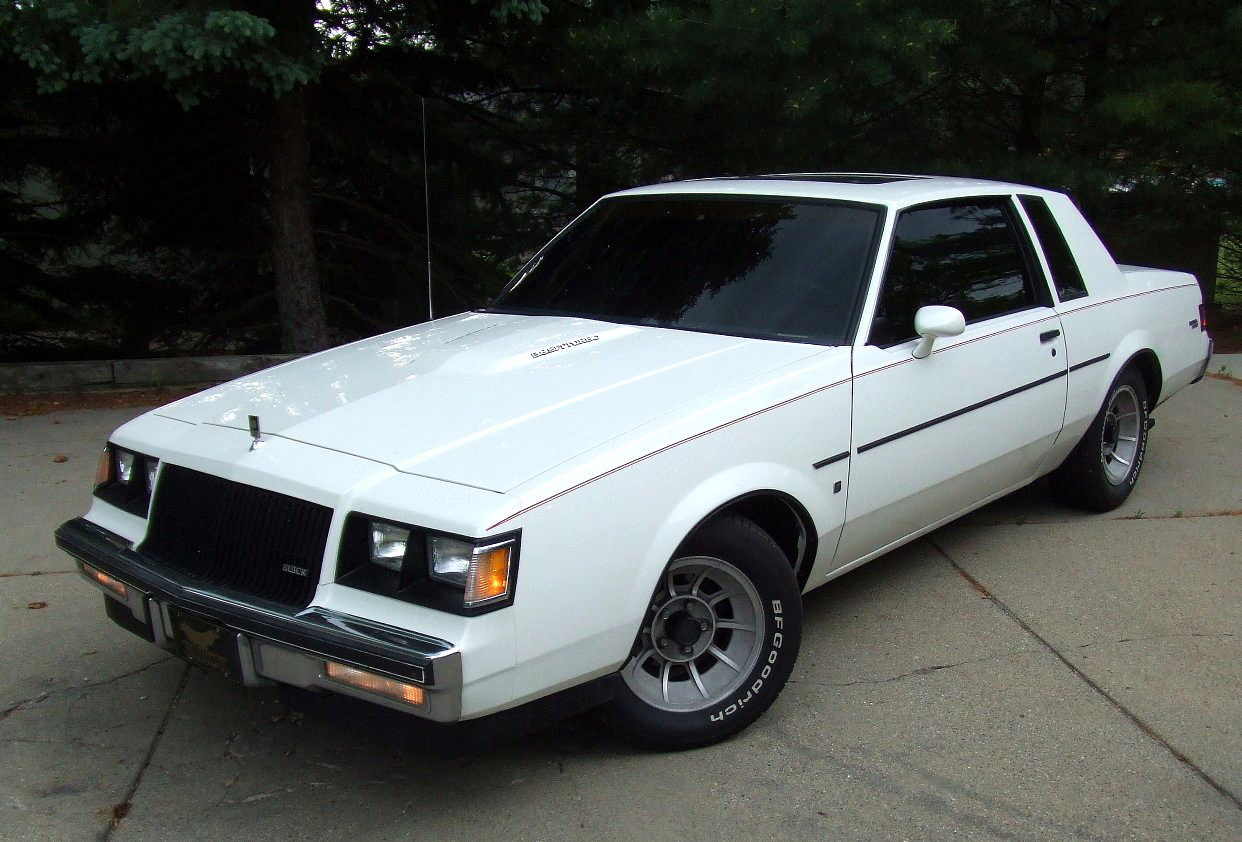
1987 Buick Regal Turbo T (with WO2 blackout trim)

For 1987, Buick split the T-Type into free-standing option packages available for the Regal Custom and Limited. The "T" option package (code Y56) retained the upgraded suspension and steering; the blackout trim (code WO2) was a stand-alone option. Consequently, the option split made the turbocharged V6 option (code LC2) available for both the Custom and Limited trims. The LC2 option included the Y56 upgrade (with the WO2 remaining separate), allowing for the theoretical combination of the upgraded chassis tuning and turbo V6–and the padded vinyl roof of the Limited.

As a running change during 1987, Buick introduced the Turbo T option (code WE4), effectively recombining all three option packages together. The WE4 package made several new weight-saving upgrades, including aluminum bumpers (and supports), and aluminum rear brake drums; the rear spoiler of the Grand National was deleted. To further save weight, the interior was configured with manual seats and windows (though air conditioning was fitted).

Though slower than the Buick GNX (which produced 31 more horsepower–officially), the 150-pound lighter WE4 Turbo T was faster than the Grand National in acceleration. The rarest G-body Regals (excepting the GNX) are the Limited Turbo (1,035 built) and the WE4 Turbo T (1,547 built–1000 more than the GNX)

As the Regal moved to the W-body platform for 1988, Buick retired the T-Type option from the model line and the optional turbocharged V6 (the latter saw its final use in the 1989 Pontiac Firebird Turbo Trans Am).

== Skylark T-Type (1983–1987) ==
Introduced for 1983, the Skylark T-Type replaced the two-door Sport trim. Offered only with the two-door coupe body, the T-Type trim was transferred to the Buick Somerset for 1985 and 1986.

=== 1983-1984 ===
Intended as the Buick counterpart of the Chevrolet Citation X-11, the Skylark T-Type was fitted with a 2.8L V6, firmer suspension, numerically-higher gearing, and wider 14-inch wheels. In place of the six-slot grille of the Sport, the T-Type shared its grille design with the standard Skylark (styled with a blackout design). The two-tone interior (with a black-painted lower body) received body-color bumpers, blackout body trim (deleting the hood ornament), and smoked taillamp lenses. The interior was upgraded over the Custom/Limited with front bucket seats, sportier trim, and a three-spoke steering wheel.

In line with its Century namesake, the Skylark T-Type utilized a naturally-aspirated powertrain.

=== 1985-1987 (Somerset/Skylark) ===
For 1985, the Skylark coupe was replaced by the Somerset as the model line moved from the X chassis to the N chassis, with the T-Type option moving to the latter model line. Retaining its blacked-out exterior (including black window and headlamp/taillamp trim), the Somerset T-Type was sold with a two-tone body (moving to a silver-painted lower body). The 125-hp 3.0 L V6 was shared with the model line, with the T-Type focusing primarily on chassis tuning upgrades.

For 1986, Buick moved the Skylark to the N-body chassis, leading to the introduction of the four-door Skylark T-type as a counterpart of the Somerset T-Type.

For the 1988 model year, Buick reverted the Somerset to the Skylark nameplate as it dropped the T-Type trim from both the Skylark coupe and sedan.

== Skyhawk T-Type (1983–1987) ==
For 1983, Buick introduced the Skyhawk T-Type. Along with serving as the sportiest variant, the T-Type served as the flagship trim for the two-door coupe, offering the highest feature content. Though the Skyhawk did not feature a traditional grille between the headlamps, its lower grille opening below the bumper was blacked out (along with the headlamp openings) and featured amber front turn signals; in line with its Skylark counterpart, the Skyhawk T-Type was styled with a two-tone exterior. The T-Type was offered with a 1.8L inline-4; for 1984, a turbocharged version of the engine became an option (unavailable with a 5-speed manual transmission).

For 1986, the Skyhawk T-Type underwent a slight facelift, adopting concealed headlamps. The T-Type also became the first Skyhawk available with the 3-door hatchback bodystyle (offered by Chevrolet, Oldsmobile, and Pontiac since 1982). For 1987 (in line with the Regal), the T-Type trim was repackaged into several stand-alone options; while the appearance option lost its two-tone paint, turbocharged cars were now fitted with 14-inch wheels. For 1988, Buick dropped the T-Type Skyhawk entirely, replacing it with the SE-trim coupe; it retained the Gran Touring suspension, 14-inch wheels, and the concealed headlamps of the previous T-Type (though the 1.8L engine was dropped entirely).

== Electra T-Type (1985–1990) ==
The 1985-1990 Electra T-Type was marketed as a sportier upgrade trim of the Buick Electra, slotted beside the flagship Park Avenue. Initially paired with the 3.8L V6 (which became the sole engine offering for 1986), the Electra T-Type traded the Dynaride suspension for a firmer-riding Gran Touring suspension. Along with larger 15-inch aluminum wheels, the T-Type was distinguished by the deletion of lower chrome trim (with the exception of the bumpers and body moldings); the front and rear turn signals were changed in color to amber.

Initially offered for both the Electra two-door and four-door, the T-Type option became exclusive to the four-door from 1986 onward.

Through its production, the Electra T-Type saw few major changes, largely facing internal competition following the introduction from the Oldsmobile Touring Sedan and the Buick Park Avenue Ultra. Following the 1990 retirement of the sixth-generation Electra, Buick retired the T-Type line altogether.

== LeSabre T-Type (1987–1989) ==
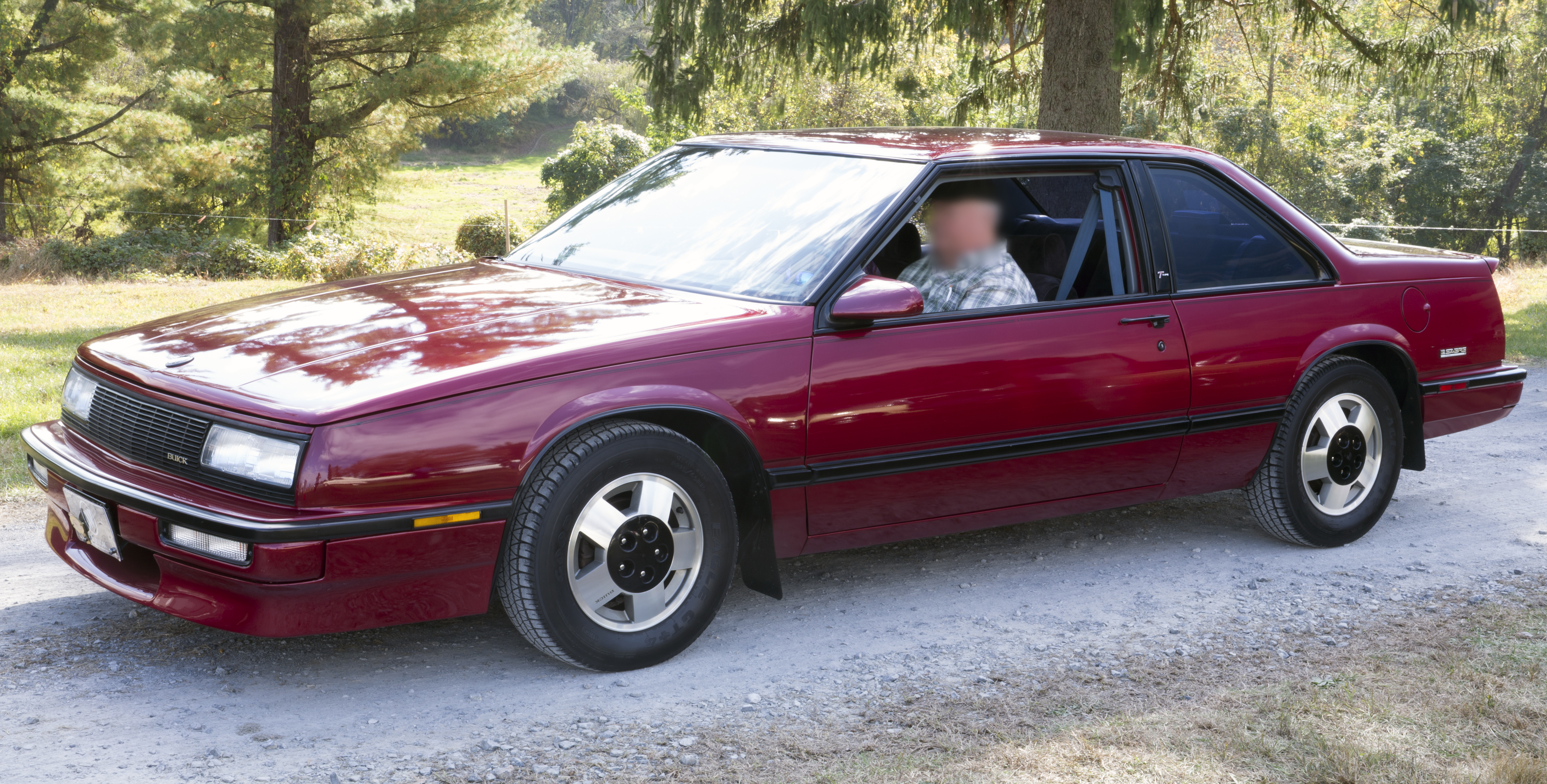
1988 Buick LeSabre T-Type

The 1987-1989 LeSabre T-Type was introduced as sports trim option package, replacing the 1986 LeSabre Grand National (designed to homologate the model line for NASCAR racing). While sharing the stock 3.8L V6 with other LeSabres (a turbocharged version in development was cancelled), the LeSabre T-Type was fitted with upgraded suspension (more aggressive than the Pontiac Bonneville SSE), revised gearing (to improve acceleration and top speed), and larger wheels and tires (5-spoke 15-inch alloy wheels, distinguished by black centers). In line with the Century Gran Sport, the LeSabre T-Type was devoid of chrome trim (with the exception of its Buick badging and its wheels); as with the Electra T-Type, the rear turn signals were amber in color.

Following the 1989 model year, the T-Type was dropped from the LeSabre model line.

== Legacy ==
Buick ended the T-Type line following the retirement of the 1990 Electra (the final year of the nameplate). The retirement of the T-Type stemmed from several factors. While demand for performance-oriented cars remained in place, the sales of several Buick model lines had collapsed, leading to their discontinuation. Buick would exit the subcompact segment entirely at the decade, leading to the demise of the Skyhawk T-Type. The Regal T-Type was retired after 1987, following the ground-up redesign of the model line (and its change of market segments). While receiving critical praise, the LeSabre T-Type saw limited sales, coinciding with its full-size two-door configuration; at the end of the 1980s, Buick began to shift its focus with the Electra on the upgraded Park Avenue Ultra trim.

Subsequently, while Buick retained the use of Gran Sport moniker (for the Regal and Skylark; the former GS trim currently remains with Buick in China, the latter ended in 1997), the brand has not again developed a comprehensive option package as a performance sub-brand (in the line of Super Sport Chevrolets). From 2008 to 2011, the Buick Super name was revived as a flagship trim, bringing a V8 engine to the Buick LaCrosse and Buick Lucerne sedans; while higher-performance, the Super trim was not as visually distinctive as the 1980s T-Types.

In 2011, turbocharged engines returned to Buick for the Regal (Opel Insignia A) in two versions. Along with the all-wheel drive GS, the front-wheel drive CXL Turbo brought the return of the "T" badge (used for 1987). The 2016 Buick Cascada (Opel Cascada) became the first Buick offered exclusively with turbocharged engines. The 2018-2020 Buick Regal TourX (Opel Insignia B Country Tourer) station wagon is the first Buick to use the T nameplate officially for Tour(ing).
