= Tee (disambiguation) =

A tee is an item of equipment in ball sports.

Tee often also refers to:

- Tee (symbol), in logic and computer science
- T, a letter of the Latin alphabet
- T-shirt, a garment
- Tee language, spoken in Nigeria

Tee, TEE or Tees may also refer to:

== Education ==
- Faculty of Technology, Engineering and the Environment (Birmingham City University), England
- Tertiary Entrance Exam, Western Australia
- Theological Education by Extension, a program in Sewanee, United States

== Music ==
- Tee Productions, a Norwegian label
- Tee Records, a British label
- Trans-Europe Express (album), 1977, by German electronic band Kraftwerk

== People ==
- Tee (surname)
- Tee (given name)
- Tee (or Ofisa Toleafoa), a competitor on The X Factor Australia 2014

== Places ==
- Ben Tee, a mountain in Scotland
- Tees, Alberta, Canada
- River Tees, England

== Science and technology ==
- tee (command), in computing
- Total energy expenditure, in human biology
- Thromboembolism, a blood clot event
- Transesophageal echocardiogram, a medical test
- Trusted execution environment, an elevated computer security framework

== Other uses ==
- Tee, a method of exchange in Enga Province, Papua New Guinea
- Teeing ground, an area of a golf course
- Trans Europ Express, a rail service in Western Europe (1957–1995)

== See also ==
- T (disambiguation)
- Tea (disambiguation)
- TE (disambiguation)
- T-shaped plumbing fittings
- Trans Europ Express (disambiguation)
