= Tea (disambiguation) =

Tea is a beverage made from steeping the processed leaves, buds, or twigs of the tea bush in water.

Tea or TEA may also refer to:

== Beverages and food ==
- Camellia sinensis, the plant the drink derives from
- Tea (meal), any of several meals, involving different times and food
- Herbal tea, or tisane, a catch-all term for any non-caffeinated beverage made from the infusion or decoction of herbs, spices, or other plant material
- Traditional English Ale, the flagship ale produced by Hogs Back Brewery in England

== People and legendary figures ==
- Tea (given name), a feminine given name
- Téa, a feminine given name
- Tea Banh (born 1945), Cambodian politician
- Thierry Tea, French-Cambodian businessman
- Tea, in Irish legend, one of the two wives of Érimón and mother of Íriel Fáid
- Tea Tephi, daughter of Zedekiah in British Israelite literature, proposed to be the same as Tea, wife of Érimón
- Eva Tea (1886–1971), Italian art historian

== Science and technology ==
=== Chemistry ===
- Tetraethylammonium, a potassium channel blocker used in neurophysiology
- Triethanolamine, an organic chemical used in cosmetics and to bind aluminium ions
- Triethylaluminium, a volatile organic chemical used in jet engines and as co-catalyst in olefin polymerization
- Triethylamine, a colorless, "fishy"-smelling organic chemical used in chemical synthesis
- 5-epiaristolochene synthase, an enzyme
- Thermal Energy Analyzer, an analytical detector for tobacco-specific nitrosamines

=== Medicine ===
- Test of Essential Academic Skills, a standardized test for nursing school admission
- Transient epileptic amnesia, a temporal lobe epilepsy

=== Computing ===
- Tea (programming language), a high-level scripting language for the Java environment
- Tiny Encryption Algorithm, a block cipher notable for its simplicity of description and implementation
- TETRA Encryption Algorithm, an encryption algorithm used in Terrestrial Trunked Radio
- TEA (text editor) (Text Editor of the Atomic Era)
- Tea (app), a mobile phone app officially known as Tea Dating Advice

=== Other ===
- TEA laser (Transversely Excited Atmospheric)
- 453 Tea, an asteroid
- Tea (wasp), a genus of spider hunting wasps

== Places ==
- Tea, South Dakota, United States, a suburb of Sioux Falls
- Tea Lake, in Oscoda County, Michigan, United States
- Tea River, in Brazil

== Arts and entertainment ==
- Tea, a 2000 novel by Stacey D'Erasmo
- Tea: A Mirror of Soul, a 2002 opera by composer Tan Dun
- "Tea", another name for the Chinese Dance in The Nutcracker
- TEA (band), a Swiss progressive heavy rock band

== Organizations and companies ==
- Tamil Eelam Army, a defunct Tamil separatist group in Sri Lanka
- Texas Economics Association, a student organization at the University of Texas at Austin
- Texas Education Agency, a branch of the government of the US state of Texas which oversees public primary and secondary education
- Themed Entertainment Association, a group representing people involved in theme parks and similar attractions
- Thorium Energy Alliance
- Tirupur Exporters' Association, an association of cotton knitwear exporters from Tirupur, India
- Trans European Airways, Belgium-based airline, now defunct
- Trenes Especiales Argentinos (Spanish: "Special Argentine Trains"), a private railway company in Argentina
- Trustees Executors and Agency Company, collapsed Australian trustee company (1879–1983)
- Tenerife Espacio de las Artes, cultural space and building in Tenerife, Canary Islands

== Other uses ==
- Targeted Employment Area, a designation investment region of the United States
- Test of English for Aviation, a language proficiency test
- Transgender Erotica Awards, movie awards for transgender pornography
- Transportation Equity Act for the 21st Century, a US federal planning law 1998–2003
- Tea (cannabis), a slang term for marijuana made popular in the 1950s by Jack Kerouac in novels such as On the Road
- Cannabis tea, a cannabis-infused drink prepared by steeping various parts of the cannabis plant in hot or cold water
- Tea (gossip), a slang term for gossip
- Techno-economic assessment, a method of analyzing the economic performance of an industrial process, product, or service.

== See also ==
- Tee, an item of sports equipment
- T, the letter of the alphabet
- T (disambiguation)
