= T (disambiguation) =

T, or t, is the twentieth letter of the English alphabet.

T may also refer to:

== Arts and entertainment ==
=== Literature ===
- T, a novel by Victor Pelevin
- T (magazine), a fashion magazine, full name T: The New York Times Style Magazine
- "T" Is for Trespass, the twentieth novel in Sue Grafton's "Alphabet mystery" series, published in 2007

=== Film and television ===
- T (2023 film), an Indian Odia-language film by Jitesh Kumar Parida
- Mr. T (born 1952), American television actor
- Ahmed Johnson (born 1963), American professional wrestler who used the ring name Big T
- Galaxy 4, a 1965 Doctor Who serial, production code "T"
- Telemundo, an American Spanish-language network with the logo "T"

=== Music ===
- Ice-T (born 1958), American rapper and actor
- T (Funker Vogt album), a 2000 aggrotech album by Funker Vogt
- T (TVXQ album), 2008
- T (Teflon Brothers album), a 2009 album by Finnish hip hop group Teflon Brothers
- "t", an Iamamiwhoami song
- Tutti, a musical term indicating the whole orchestra as opposed to a soloist
- Tenor, a type of male singing voice
- t, note abbreviation in tonic sol-fa for seventh scale degree
- T-Babe, a virtual pop singer
- T in the Park, an annual music festival, held in Kinross, Scotland

=== Video games ===
- T (teen), a game rating from the Entertainment Software Rating Board

== Businesses and brands ==
- AT&T, an American phone company with the New York Stock Exchange ticker symbol T
- T-Mobile International AG, mobile network operator based in Germany
- T-Online, German Internet Service Provider
- T-Systems, German IT services company
- T, Toshiba's mobile phones in Japan

== Language ==
- [t], the International Phonetic Alphabet character for the voiceless alveolar plosive
- [ʈ], the IPA character representing the voiceless retroflex stop
- Т, a letter of the Cyrillic alphabet
- T-unit, a grammatical term

== Places ==
- "The T", a nickname for the rural part of Pennsylvania, also known as Pennsyltucky
- Nantes, France, by mintmark
- Purwakarta, Karawang and Subang, Indonesia (vehicle registration prefix T)
- T (Tango), the military time zone code for UTC−07:00, covering parts of western North America and the South Pacific

== Science, technology, and mathematics ==
=== Biology and medicine ===
- T-box transcription factor T, a transcription factor
- Troponin T, one of the three troponins
- Haplogroup T (mtDNA), a human mitochondrial DNA (mtDNA) haplogroup
- T cells, part of the components of the immune system along with B cells
- T wave, the repolarization wave of cardiac ventricles in electrocardiography
- Testosterone, a male sex hormone
- Thoracic vertebrae T-1 through T-12
- Threonine, one of the 20 amino acids used in transcription of a polypeptide chain
- Thymine, one of the four nucleic acids of DNA

=== Computing ===
- T (programming language), created in the early 1980s
- t-distributed stochastic neighbor embedding, a machine learning algorithm for data visualization
- T-pose, a default pose for a 3D model's skeleton before it is animated
- Transfer (computing), a data transfer, often used to measure speed (e.g. megatransfers per second)

=== Mathematics and logic ===
- "True" in logic
- ⊤, the top element of a partially ordered set
- t, the angular coordinate of the polar coordinate system (usually denoted ϕ or θ, sometimes t)
- T, in modal logic
- $\mathbb{T}$, the circle group
- $\mathbb{T}^n$, the n-dimensional torus ($\mathbb{R}^n/\mathbb{Z}^n$)
- T score, a statistical term
- Student's t-distribution, statistical term
- Transpose of a matrix, indicated with a superscript T, as in A^{T}

=== Physics and chemistry ===
==== Physical quantities ====
- Period, the reciprocal of frequency, often denoted "T"
- Temperature, often denoted "T"
- Time, often denoted "t"
- Torque, often denoted $\tau$

==== Other uses in physics and chemistry ====
- Tritium, a radioactive isotope of hydrogen, denoted "T"
- Time-reversal symmetry, in particle physics
- Class T, a cool brown dwarf class of stars
- ΔT (disambiguation), change in one of several quantities denoted by T, such as time or temperature

=== Other uses in science ===
- T-rex, an abbreviation for Tyrannosaurus rex
- Thunderstorm
- T-number in the Dvorak technique, a way to rate storm intensity

=== Other uses in technology ===
- T, Toshiba's mobile phones in Japan
- Telephone number, sometimes abbreviated T
- Landing T, a ground signal that indicates the wind direction in aerodromes

== Transportation ==
=== Vehicles ===
- Ford Model T, a motor car produced in the U.S. 1908–1927
- NZR T class steam locomotives in New Zealand
- OS T1000, an Oslo Metro train
- T gauge, a scale for model railroad trains
- Tank locomotive

=== Public transport ===
==== Japan ====
- Tanimachi Line, a subway service operated by the Osaka Metro, labeled
- Tokyo Metro Tozai Line, a subway service operated by the Tokyo Metro, labeled
- Tsuyama Line, a railway service operated by West Japan Railway Company, with the official service symbol

==== United States ====
- Massachusetts Bay Transportation Authority (nicknamed the "T")
- Pittsburgh Light Rail, commonly called the T
- T (New York City Subway service)
- T Line (Sound Transit) in Tacoma, Washington
- T Third Street in San Francisco, California
- Trinity Metro, formerly known as "The T", a transit agency serving Fort Worth, Texas and suburbs
- T (SEPTA Metro), formerly known as the Subway–Surface Trolleys, in Philadelphia, Pennsylvania

==== Other countries ====
- Oslo Metro or Oslo T-bane
- Stockholm Metro or T-bana

== Units of measurement and multipliers ==
- Tera-, abbreviated T, an SI prefix meaning one trillion
- Tablespoon, abbreviated "T" or "Tbsp"
- Teaspoon, abbreviated "t" or "tsp"
- Tesla (unit), symbol "T", the SI unit of magnetic field
- Tonne or metric ton, SI symbol "t"

== Other uses ==
- Titus (praenomen), common name throughout Roman history, regularly abbreviated T
- Treasury (as in T-Bill, T-Bond, T-Note)
- A mintmark for Nantes, France
- T-bone steak, a cut of meat
- T-shirt, a type of clothing
- Crossing the T, a classic naval warfare tactic
- Stealing the 'T', an historic college prank at the Georgia Institute of Technology

== See also ==
- Big T (disambiguation)
- Mr. T (disambiguation)
- Tee (disambiguation)
- Tea (disambiguation)
- T class (disambiguation)
- Class T (disambiguation)
- T-type (disambiguation)
