= Delta time (disambiguation) =

Delta time can mean:

- ΔT (timekeeping), the time difference between Universal Time and Terrestrial Time.
- Delta timing, a technique used in graphics programming.

== See also ==
- ΔT (disambiguation)
