= Sròn a' Choire Ghairbh =

Mountain in Scotland

Coordinates: 57°0′31″N 4°55′44″W

Sròn a’ Choire Ghairbh
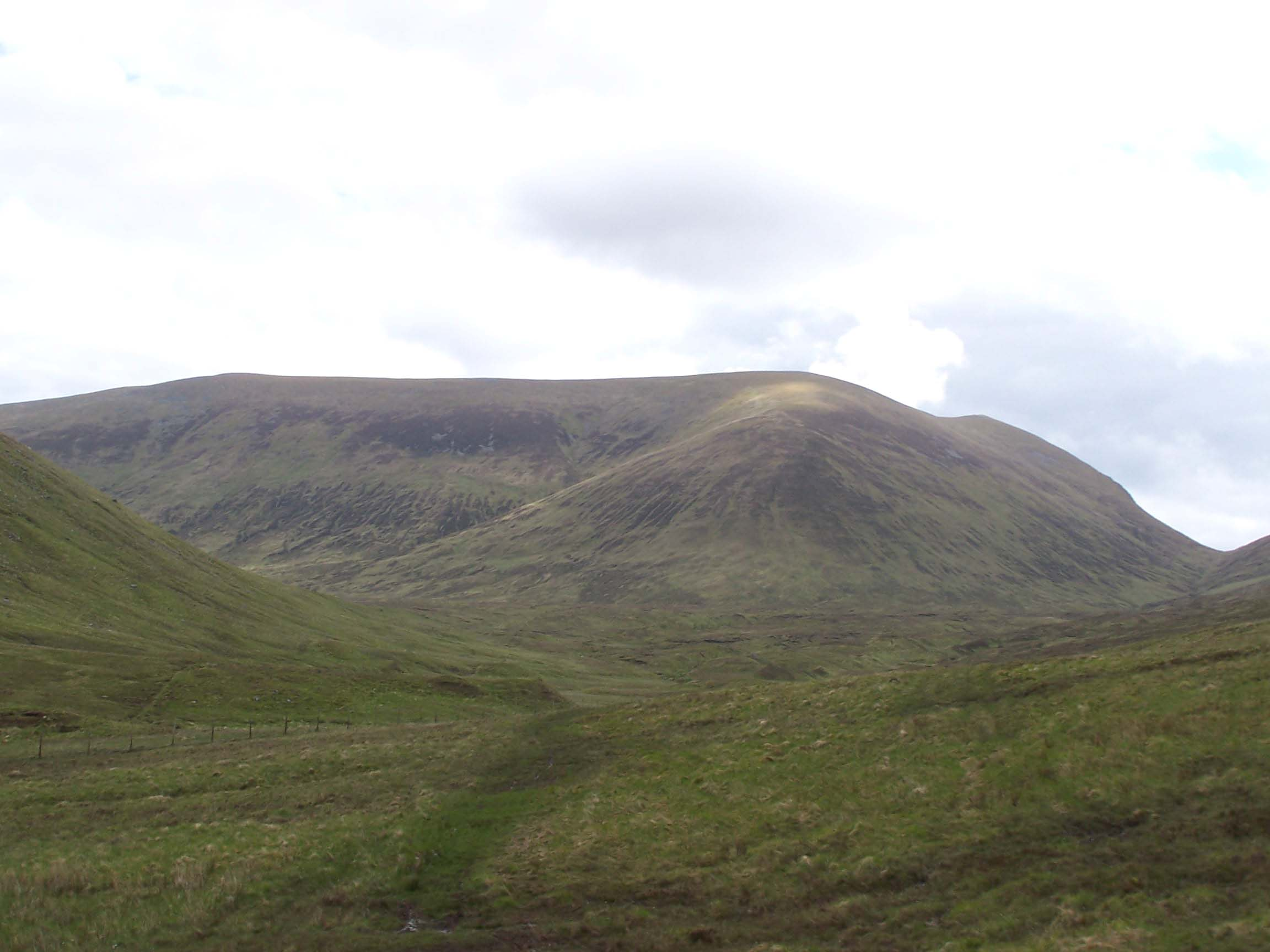
- The western slopes of Sròn a‘ Choire Ghairbh seen from the head of Gleann Cia-aig. Càm Bhealach is seen on the right hand side.

Highest point
- Elevation: 937 m (3,074 ft)
- Prominence: 622 m (2,041 ft)
- Parent peak: Sgurr na Ciche
- Listing: Munro, Marilyn

Naming
- English translation: Nose of the Rough Corrie
- Language of name: Gaelic
- Pronunciation: Scottish Gaelic: [ˈs̪t̪ɾɔːn ə ˈxɔɾʲə ˈɣɛɾʲɛv] English approximation: STRAWN-ə-khor-yə-GHERR-yev

Geography
- Location: Highland, Scotland
- Parent range: Northwest Highlands
- OS grid: NN222946
- Topo map: OS Landranger 34, OS Explorer 400

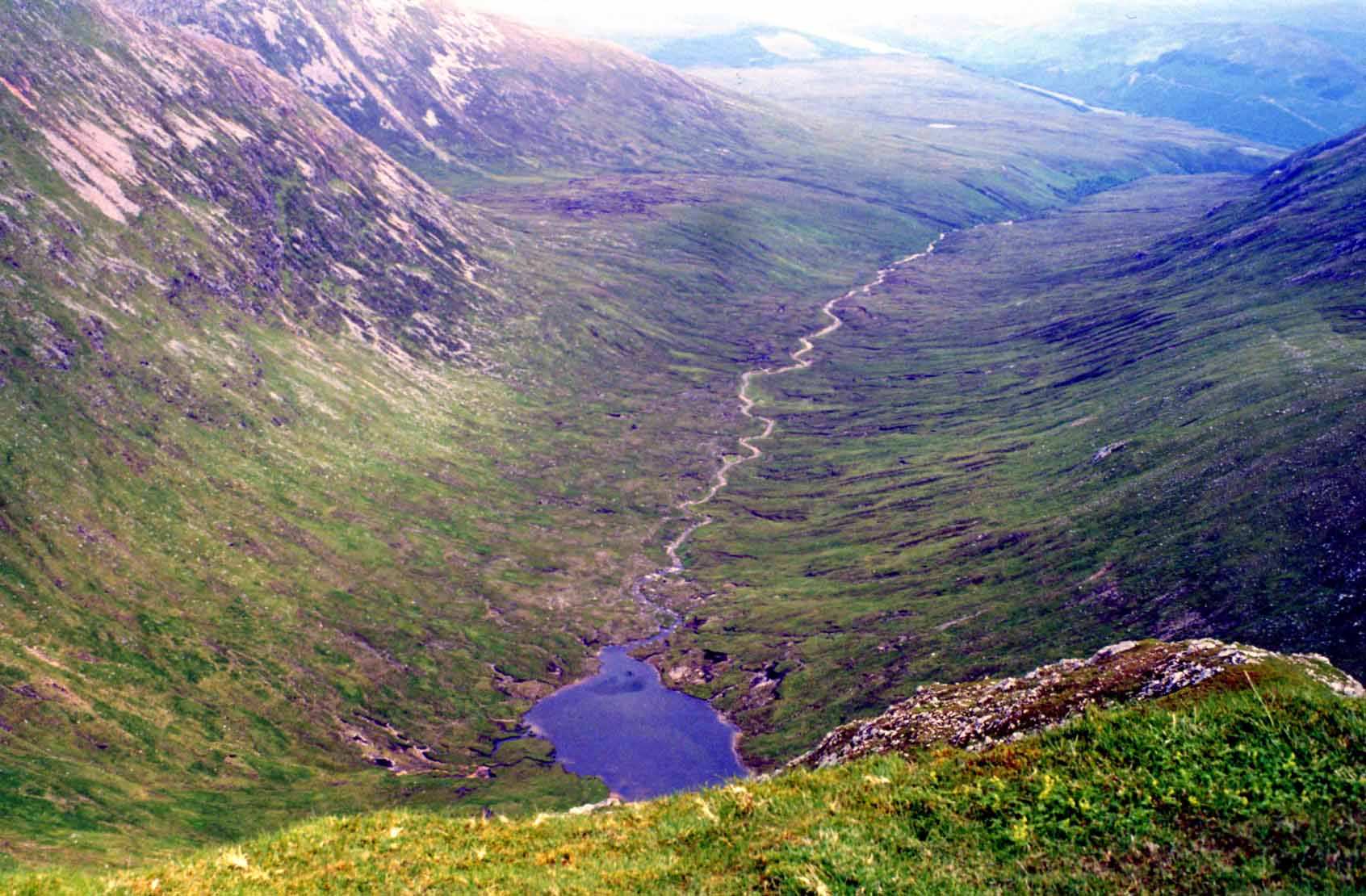
Looking down into Coire Glas from the summit.

Sròn a’ Choire Ghairbh is a Scottish mountain situated on the northern side of Loch Lochy, 13 kilometres north of Spean Bridge in the Highland Council area.

== Overview ==
Sròn a’ Choire Ghairbh reaches a height of 937 metres (3074 feet) and is classified as both a Munro and a Marilyn. It is highest of the Loch Lochy hills and is invariably climbed along with the neighbouring Munro of Meall na Teanga to which it is joined by the distinctive col of Càm Bhealach. Both these hills which are often referred to as the Loch Lochy Munros are well seen from the A82 road on the opposite side of the loch, showing steep slopes which are forested below the 300 metre contour. There are also extensive conifer plantings on the lower northern (Glen Garry) side of the mountain, this is gradually being restored to native species. The hill's name translates from the Gaelic as The Nose of the Rough Corrie, referring to the summit's location on the edge of the craggy Coire Glas, which stands to the east.

== Geography ==
Sròn a’ Choire Ghairbh’s main geographical feature is the Coire Glas which has the small Loch a’ Choire Ghlais within its upper recesses. The mountain is horseshoe shaped and throws down two ridges on either side of the corrie, the lengthy east ridge is five kilometres long and goes over the two subsidiary tops of Sean Mheall (888 metres) and Meall nan Dearcag (693 metres) before descending to the Kilfinnan Burn at the north end of Loch Lochy. Another ridge called Meall a’ Choire Ghlais goes north and then north east along the other side of Coire Glas, it loses very little height for two kilometres before descending steeply and rockily to the Bealach Easain (548 metres) which connects it to the Corbett Ben Tee.

In all other directions the mountain is steep and grassy, to the south lies Càm Bhealach, a mountain pass between Sròn a’ Choire Ghairbh and the Munro Meall na Teanga. Càm Bhealach is seen as a distinct notch in the skyline between the two Munros whether viewed from the east or the west. To the north is the small Coire an Eich which drains north into Glen Garry to find its way to the sea at the east coast via Loch Oich and Loch Ness. Sròn a’ Choire Ghairbh is on the main east-west watershed of Scotland with rainfall on all other parts of the hill going to the west coast via Loch Lochy and Loch Linnhe.

A 1.5 GW pumped-storage hydroelectricity project storing 24 hours of power is planned to connect Coire Glas with Loch Lochy.

== Ascents ==
Sròn a’ Choire Ghairbh is nearly always climbed from Càm Bhealach, however there are two possible ways of arriving there. The southern approach starts at the car park at the Eas Cia-aig waterfall on the B8005 at grid reference NN176888, Gleann Cia-aig is ascended to its head where Càm Bhealach is clearly in view. The approach from the north east starts at the car park at Laggan Locks just off the A82 at grid reference NN287963 and takes the rising track through the forest on Loch Lochy’s northern side to reach Càm Bhealach. The continuation to the summit from Càm Bhealach follows a very good stalkers path which zig zags up the mountainside to the highest point which overlooks Coire Glas. The mountain has a substantial prominence of 622 metres ensuring that the summit is a fine viewpoint for the surrounding mountains of Lochaber and beyond.

Sròn a’ Choire Ghairbh is one of the few hills in Scotland that has a visitors book at its summit (Mam Sodhail being one of the others). The book is kept in a coffee jar inside a wooden box and is maintained by Richard Wood of Invergarry.

The two Loch Lochy Munros are sometimes climbed by travellers on the Great Glen Way between Fort William and Inverness, the two hills offering variety on what is a low level multi day walk.

== References and footnotes ==
- The Munros, Scottish Mountaineering Trust, 1986, Donald Bennet (Editor) ISBN 0-907521-13-4
- The High Mountains of Britain and Ireland, Diadem, 1993, Irvine Butterfield, ISBN 0-906371-30-9
- Hamish’s Mountain Walk, Baton Wicks, 1996, Hamish Brown, ISBN 1-898573-08-5
- The Munro - Scotland's Highest Mountains, 2006, Cameron McNeish, ISBN 1-84204-082-0

Footnotes
