= Greenwood Township, Oscoda County, Michigan =

Greenwood Township, Michigan
- Civil township
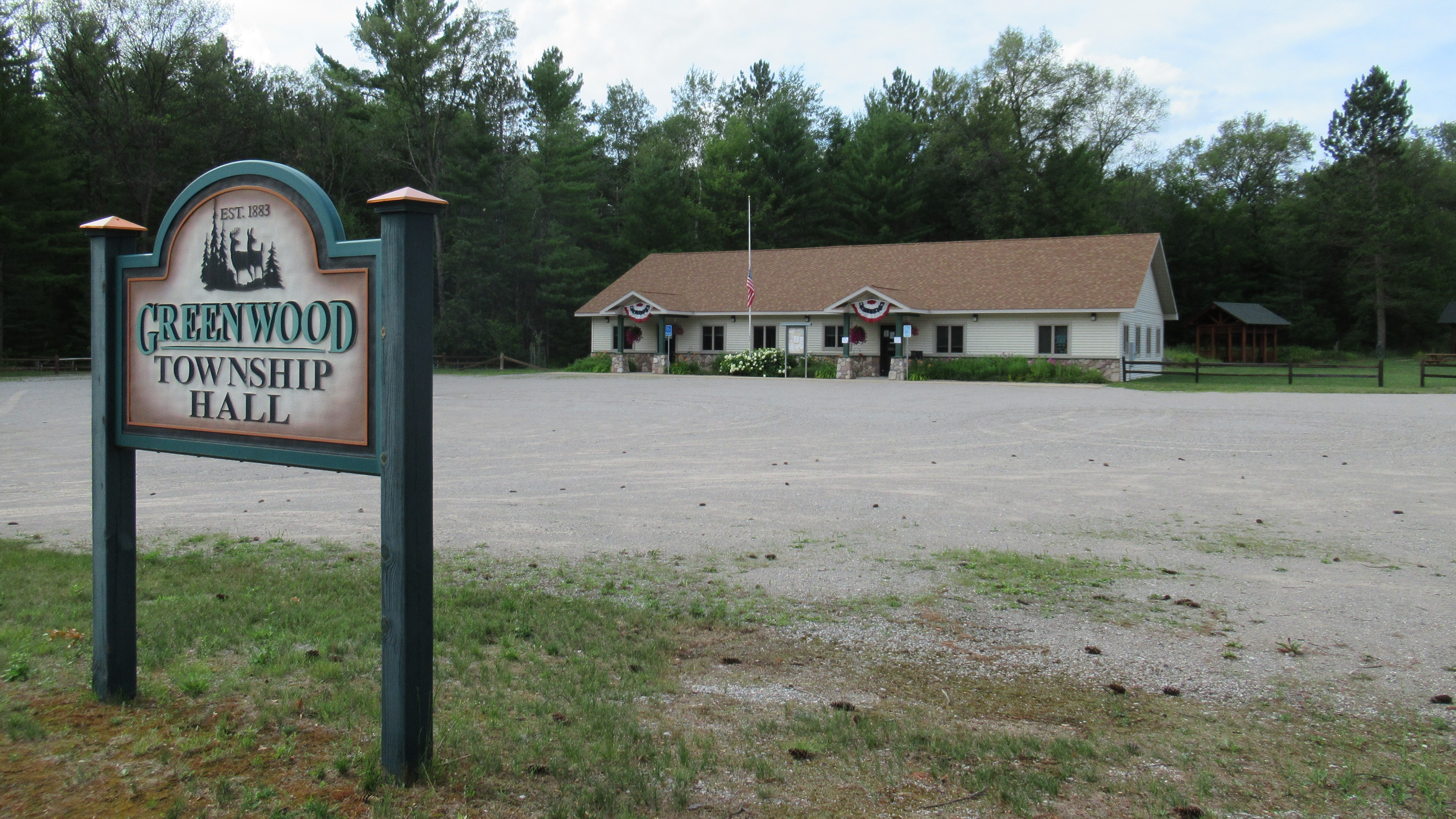
- Greenwood Township Hall

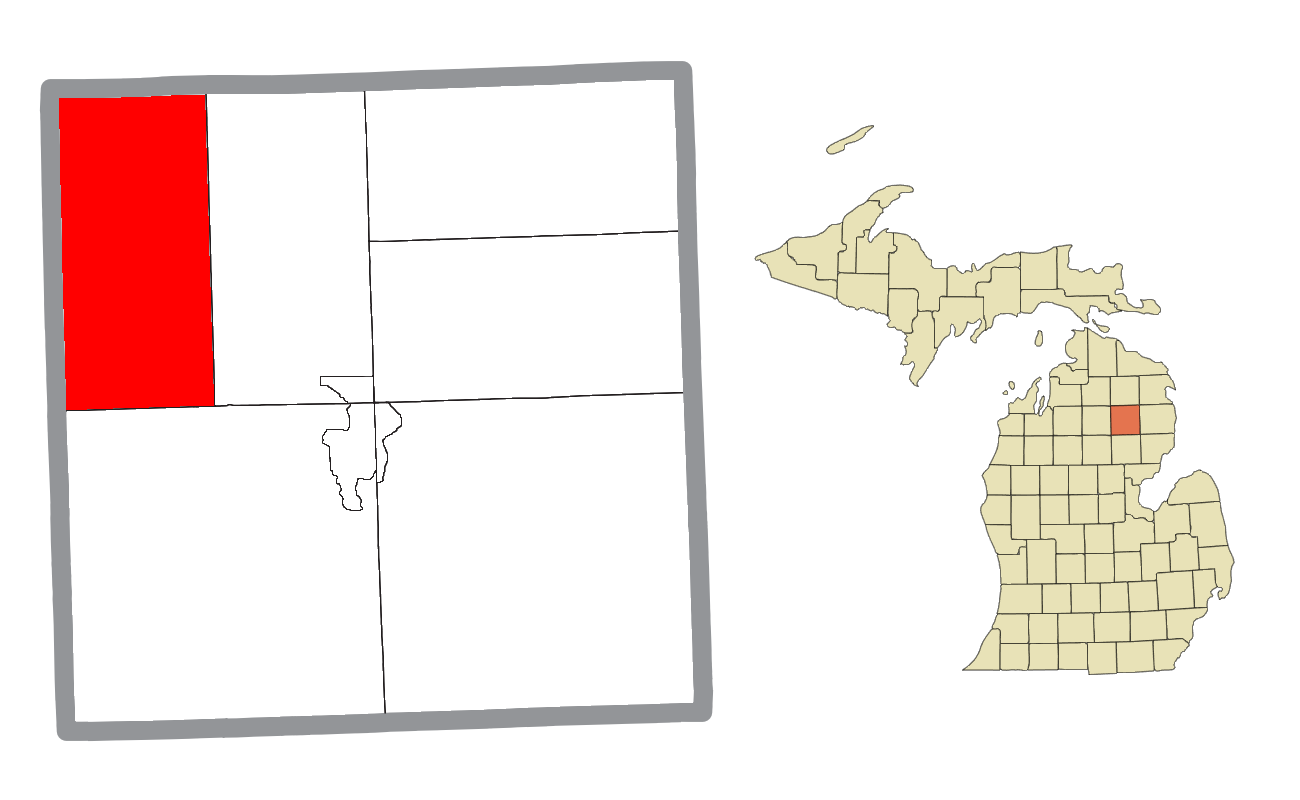
- Location within Oscoda County

- Location within the state of Michigan Location within the United States
- Coordinates: 44°47′33″N 84°18′41″W
- Country: United States
- State: Michigan
- County: Oscoda
- Established: 1883

Government
  - Supervisor: Fredrick Lindsey
  - Clerk: Suzanne Scott

Area
  - Total: 70.87 sq mi (183.6 km^{2})
  - Land: 70.00 sq mi (181.3 km^{2})
  - Water: 0.87 sq mi (2.3 km^{2})
- Elevation: 1,178 ft (359 m)

Population (2020)
  - Total: 1,158
  - Density: 16.5/sq mi (6.4/km^{2})
- Time zone: UTC-5 (Eastern (EST))
  - Summer (DST): UTC-4 (EDT)
- ZIP code(s): 49765 (Lewiston)
- Area code: 989
- FIPS code: 26-35200
- GNIS feature ID: 1626404
- Website: Official website

Greenwood Township is a civil township of Oscoda County in the U.S. state of Michigan. The population was 1,158 at the 2020 census.

== Communities ==
- Red Oak is an unincorporated community within the township at 44°42′35″N 84°17′32″W. The community began as a station along the Au Sable & Northwestern Railroad and received a now-defunct post office on August 27, 1888.

== Geography ==
According to the U.S. Census Bureau, the township has a total area of 70.87 square miles (183.55 km^{2}), of which, 70.00 square miles (181.30 km^{2}) of it is land and 0.87 square miles (2.25 km^{2}) of it (1.23%) is water.

Tea Lake, a natural freshwater kettle-type lake, is located in Greenwood Township.

== Demographics ==
As of the census of 2000, there were 1,195 people, 550 households, and 364 families residing in the township. The population density was 17.1 inhabitants per square mile (6.6/km^{2}). There were 1,664 housing units at an average density of 23.8 per square mile (9.2/km^{2}). The racial makeup of the township was 98.08% White, 0.08% African American, 0.59% Native American, 0.08% Asian, and 1.17% from two or more races. Hispanic or Latino of any race were 1.26% of the population.

There were 550 households, out of which 18.0% had children under the age of 18 living with them, 58.9% were married couples living together, 4.4% had a female householder with no husband present, and 33.8% were non-families. 29.5% of all households were made up of individuals, and 13.5% had someone living alone who was 65 years of age or older. The average household size was 2.17 and the average family size was 2.65.

In the township the population was spread out, with 18.2% under the age of 18, 3.7% from 18 to 24, 21.3% from 25 to 44, 31.3% from 45 to 64, and 25.6% who were 65 years of age or older. The median age was 50 years. For every 100 females, there were 98.8 males. For every 100 females age 18 and over, there were 101.2 males.

The median income for a household in the township was $28,426, and the median income for a family was $33,235. Males had a median income of $31,667 versus $17,917 for females. The per capita income for the township was $17,083. About 8.9% of families and 13.1% of the population were below the poverty line, including 26.6% of those under age 18 and 5.5% of those age 65 or over.
