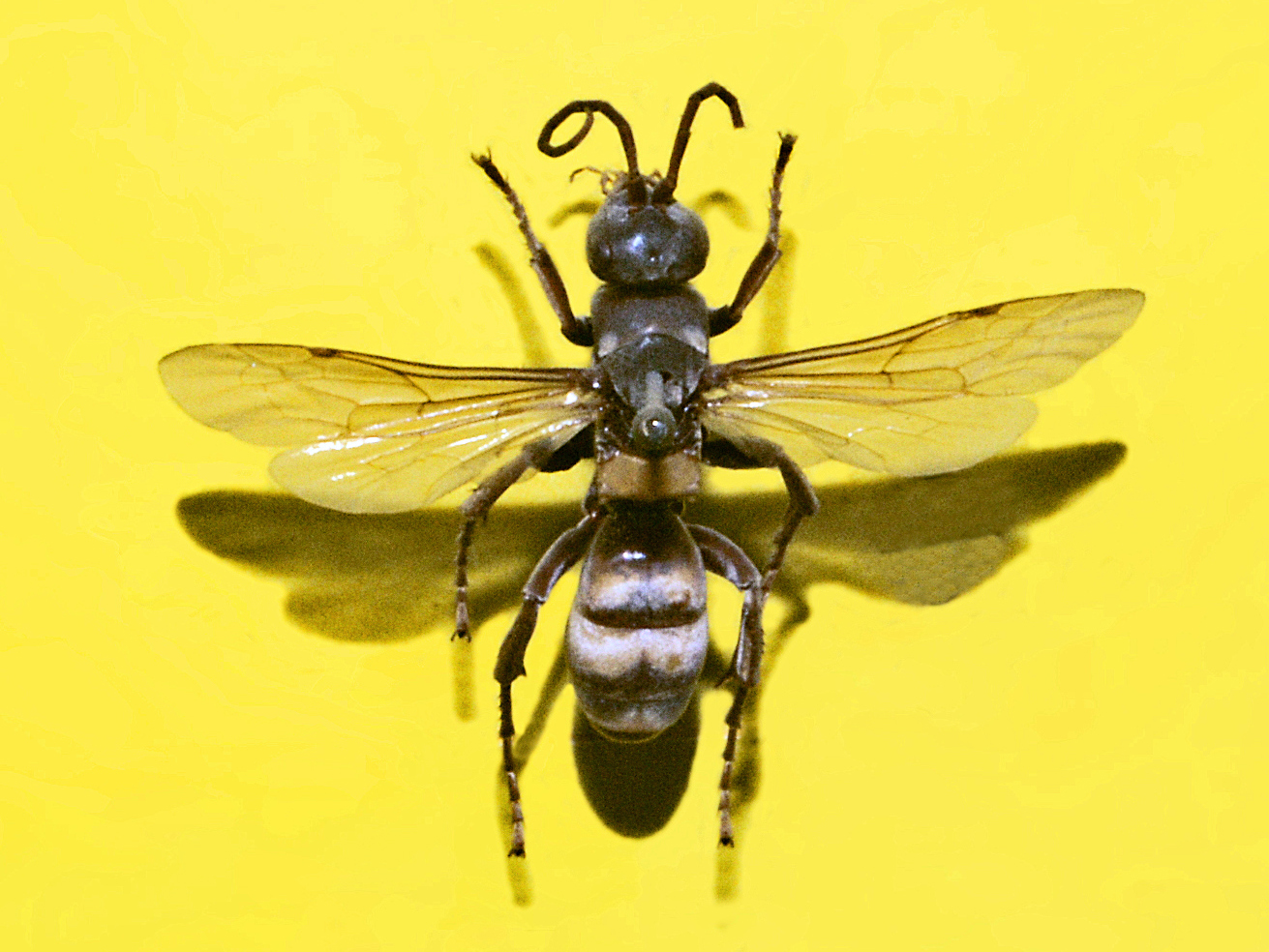
- Female of Eoferreola thoracica. Museum specimen

Scientific classification
- Kingdom: Animalia
- Phylum: Arthropoda
- Class: Insecta
- Order: Hymenoptera
- Family: Pompilidae
- Genus: Eoferreola
- Species: E. thoracica

Binomial name
- Eoferreola thoracica (Rossi, 1794)

Synonyms
- Tea thoracica (Rossi, 1794); Sphex thoracica Rossi, 1794; Ferreola thoracica (Rossi, 1794); Paraferreola rhombica thoracica (Rossi, 1794); Paraferreola thoracica (Rossi, 1794); Pompilus thoracicus Marquet, 1879; Pompilus ursus thoracicus (Rossi, 1794)

= Eoferreola thoracica =

Species of wasp

Eoferreola thoracica is a species of spider wasp in the family Pompilidae, found in Europe.
