= Ben Tee =

Mountain in the Scottish Highlands, UK

Coordinates: 57.032511°N 4.899216°W

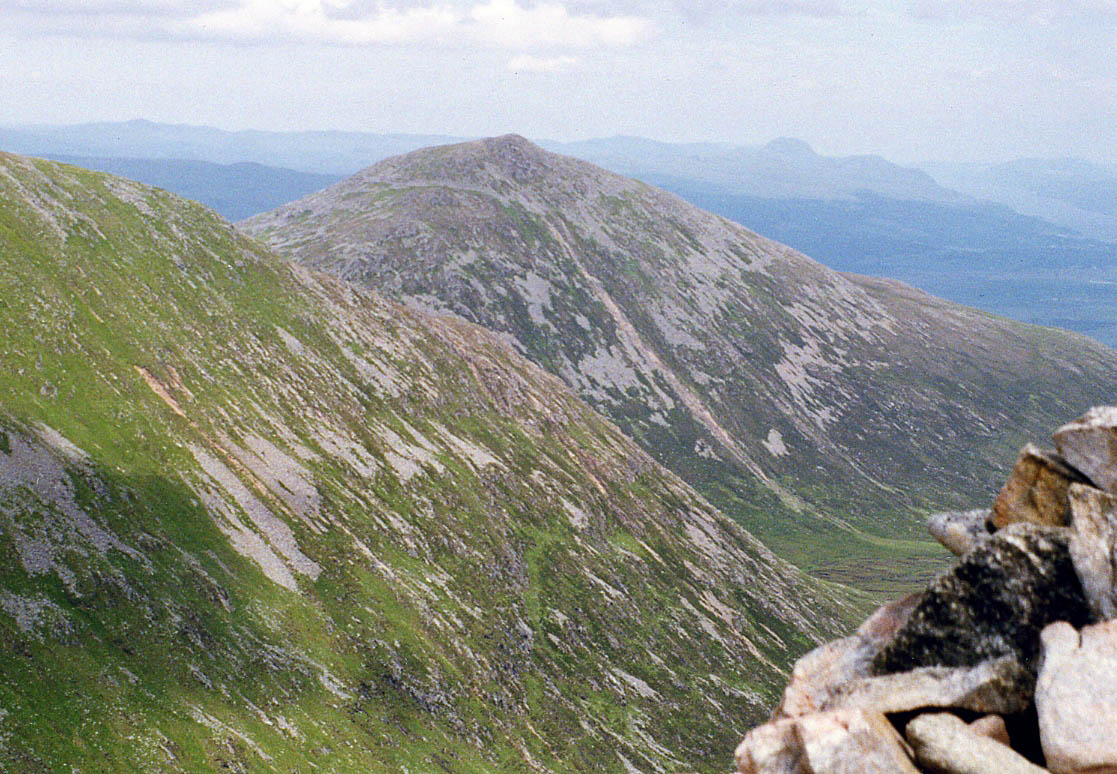
- Ben Tee seen from the cairn on Sròn a' Choire Ghairbh, 3 km to the SW.

Highest point
- Elevation: 904 m (2,966 ft)
- Prominence: 356 m (1,168 ft)
- Listing: Corbett, Marilyn

Naming
- Native name: Beinn an t-Sìthidh (Scottish Gaelic)
- English translation: Fairy Hill
- Pronunciation: Scottish Gaelic: [peɲ əɲ ˈtʲiːɪ]

Geography
- Location: Highland, Scotland
- Parent range: Northwest Highlands
- OS grid: NN240971
- Topo map: OS Landranger 34, OS Explorer 400

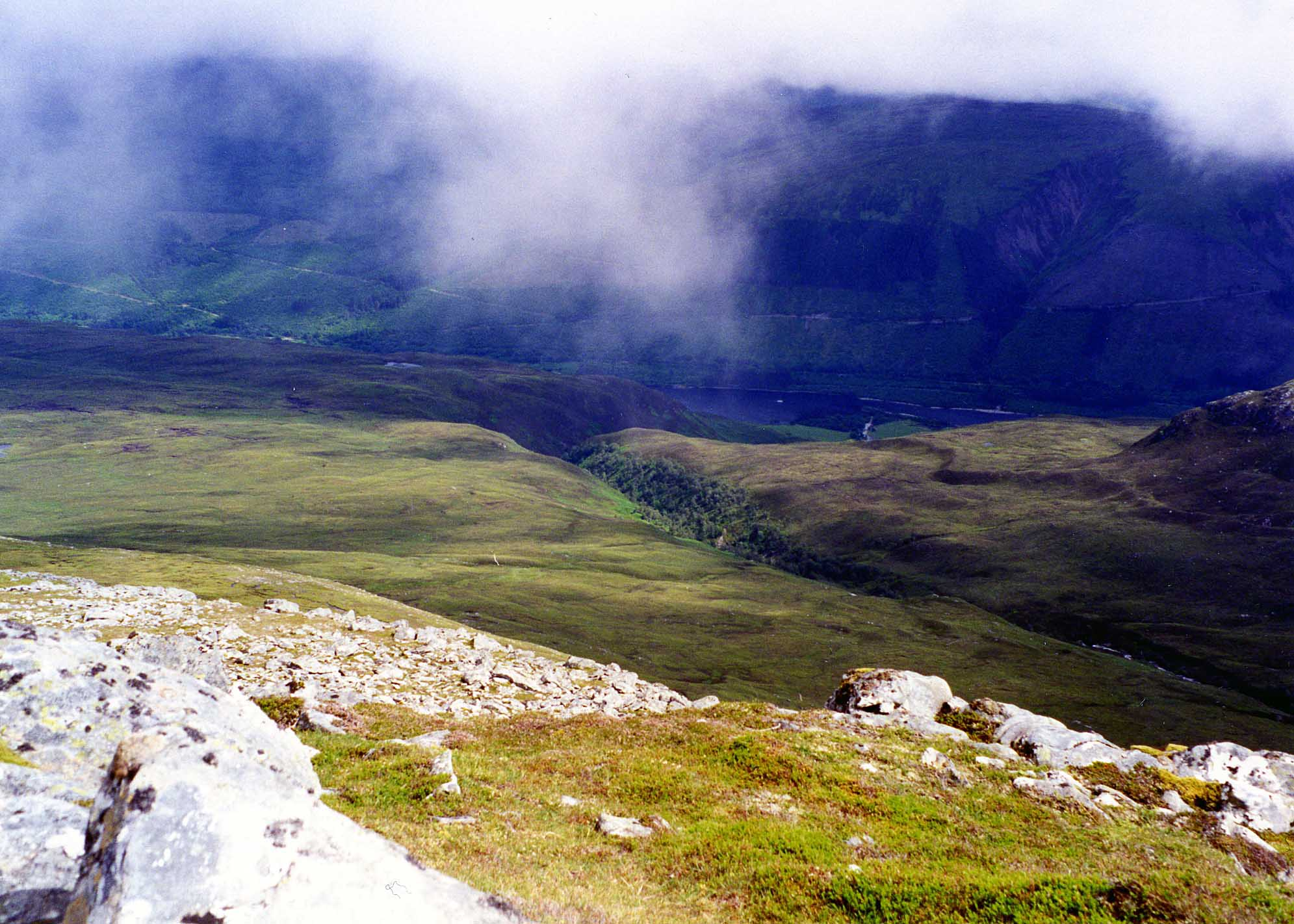
Looking SW from the summit of Ben Tee, The Kilfinnan gorge and part of Loch Lochy are in view.

Ben Tee (Scottish Gaelic: Beinn an t-Sìthidh) is a Scottish mountain situated in the Lochaber area of the Highland council area, some 15 kilometres north of Spean Bridge. It is rated as one of the best of Scotland's smaller mountains with Hamish Brown saying:

Ben Tee is such a shapely cone that it is instantly recognisable from anywhere around the Great Glen or along the Garry. Its isolated situation makes it one of Scotland’s finest summit viewpoints.

== Overview ==
Ben Tee forms part of the Loch Lochy hills along with the Munros of Sròn a' Choire Ghairbh and Meall na Teanga which lie to the south west. It has a height of 904 metres (2966 feet) and qualifies as a Corbett and a Marilyn. It is just 10 metres (33 feet) short of being a Munro and it is one of the most recognisable hills in the area with its symmetrical cone making it conspicuous in views for many miles around. The hill lies to the north of Loch Lochy where Glen Garry intersects with the Great Glen.

== Name ==
The origins of the name Ben Tee is not entirely clear. The most widely accepted translation is "Fairy Hill" from Gaelic Beinn an t-Sìthidh. Ben Tee's conical shape is very similar to that of Schiehallion, also a conical "fairy hill", which gives extra credibility to that translation.

More fanciful suggestions include a derivation from Beinn an Taighe meaning "mountain of the house" or Beinn Dhè, meaning "mountain of God", a number of years ago leading someone to paint the word GOD on the summit rocks.

== Local significance ==
An informal local name for Ben Tee is “Glengarry’s Bowling Green”, a rather sardonic name because there is hardly any grass on the rocky summit. Local legend says that nearby Invergarry Castle on the northern shores of Loch Oich was built from stone from Ben Tee's summit, with workers passing stone hand to hand down the mountain. This story is possibly true as the hill would have great symbolic value to local inhabitants. There is an annual Ben Tee Hill Race, a 14.5 km event starting and finishing at the Glengarry Shinty Club pitch with 900 metres of ascent. The winning runner usually takes about 80 minutes to complete the course to the summit and back.

== Geography ==
Ben Tee is a hill with few outstanding geographical features, it has a broad grassy eastern ridge which sweeps down to the northern end of Loch Lochy and the Laggan lochs and gives one of the most popular approaches to the mountain. The southern slopes of the mountain drop very steeply to the valley of the Allt a’ Choire Ghlais, a stream which drains eastwards entering a steeply wooded gorge where it changes its name to the Kilfinnan Burn. The gorge contains the Kilfillan Falls, a series of waterfalls, as the burn drains to the Great Glen at the north end of Loch Lochy.

To the north, the mountain descends to Glen Garry with the trees of the Glengarry forest appearing on the slopes below the 350 metre contour. There are steep slopes to the east which go down to the Bealach Easain, a col with a height of 548 metres which connects to the adjacent Munro of Sròn a' Choire Ghairbh, the col contains a small lochan at its highest point. All drainage from Ben Tee reaches the Great Glen but goes to both the west and east coast of Scotland. Rainfall on the northern part of the hill goes via Glen Garry and the River Garry to reach Loch Oich from where it flows north east through Loch Ness to reach the east coast at the Moray Firth. Rainfall on the southern slopes goes via the Kilfinnan Burn to reach Loch Lochy where it flows south west to reach the sea loch of Loch Linnhe on the west coast.

== Ascents ==
The most popular ascent of Ben Tee starts at the Laggan locks on the Caledonian Canal at grid reference NN287963 where there is a car park. The minor road to Kilfinnan on the north side of Loch Lochy is taken and left about 200 metres before the Kilfinnan Burn is reached to strike north west up the steep slopes of Ben Tee. Do not take the path to the Kilfinnan Falls as it is not possible to exit the gorge further up, however the falls are worth visiting but steps will have to be retraced. The route continues across moorland which steepens to reach the broad eastern ridge and then the summit. Approaches are possible from the north and the east, one starts at the bridge over Loch Garry (grid reference NH195022), while another starts at the Forestry Commission's Alt na Cailliche car park near Invergarry (grid reference NH282006). Both these routes are longer than the Kilfinnan approach.

== Bibliography ==
- The Corbetts and Other Scottish Hills, Scott Johnstone (Editor) et al., ISBN 0-907521-29-0
- Scotland Coast to Coast, Hamish Brown, ISBN 1-85260-229-5
- The Call of the Corbetts, Irvine Butterfield, ISBN 0-7153-2754-2
- Climbing the Corbetts, Hamish Brown, ISBN 1-898573-08-5
- Adventure Guide to Scotland, Martin Li ISBN 1-58843-406-0
