= Tee (surname) =

- Language: Chinese, English

Origin
- Region of origin: Southeast Asia (among overseas Chinese with ancestors from Fujian and Hainan); United Kingdom

Other names
- Variant forms: English: Tye; Chinese: Zheng, Cheng, Tay

Tee is an English and Chinese surname

== Origins ==
As an English surname, Tee originates in two ways:

1. As a variant spelling of Tye, a locative surname from Middle English atte teye 'at the enclosure'
2. Also as a locative surname, from an erroneous rebracketing of atte e 'at the stream'

Tee may also be the spelling of multiple Chinese surnames, based on their pronunciation in different varieties of Chinese; they are listed below by their spelling in Hanyu Pinyin, which reflects the standard Mandarin pronunciation:

1. Zhèng (traditional Chinese: 鄭; simplified Chinese: 郑), spelled Tee based on its Hokkien pronunciation (Pe̍h-ōe-jī: Tīⁿ; IPA: /tĩ²²/, with nasalisation of the vowel). This spelling is found for example among overseas Chinese communities in Malaysia, in the Philippines, and in Singapore.
2. Chí (池), spelled Tee based on its Hokkien pronunciation (Pe̍h-ōe-jī: Tî; IPA: /ti²⁴/; without the nasalised vowel of the above surname). This spelling is found for example in Singapore.
3. Dài (戴), spelled Tee based on its pronunciation in Hokkien (Pe̍h-ōe-jī: Tì; IPA: /ti⁴¹/) or Teochew (Peng'im: Di3; IPA: /ti²¹³/). This spelling is found for example in Indonesia.
4. Shī (施), spelled Tee based on its Hainanese pronunciation (Hainanese Transliteration Scheme: Ti^{1}). This spelling is found for example in Singapore.

== Statistics ==
According to statistics compiled by Patrick Hanks on the basis of the 2011 United Kingdom census and the Census of Ireland 2011, 1,065 people on the island of Great Britain and 10 on the island of Ireland bore the surname Tee as of 2011. In the 1881 United Kingdom census there had been 583 people with the surname Tee, primarily at Hampshire, Northamptonshire, and Sussex. The 2010 United States census found 1,557 people with the surname Tee, making it the 17,951st-most-common name in the country. This represented an increase from 1,381 (18,461st most-common) in the 2000 Census. In the 2010 census, roughly half of the bearers of the surname identified as non-Hispanic Asian, three-tenths as non-Hispanic white, and one-tenth as non-Hispanic Black or African American.

== People with the surname ==
- Elsa Tee (1917–2006), British actress
- Tee Tua Ba (郑大峇; born 1942), former Commissioner of Police of Singapore
- Tee Hock Seng (郑福成; born 1949), Malaysian businessman
- Nicholas Tee (born 1949), British rower
- Tee Siew Kiong (郑修强; born c. 1963), Malaysian politician (Malaysian Chinese Association)
- Brian Tee (politician) (born 1969), Australian politician
- Tee Boon Tsong (鄭凱聰; born c. 1978), Malaysian politician (Democratic Action Party)
- Hayden Tee (born c. 1978), New Zealand actor
- Benjamin Tee (born c. 1981), Singaporean electronic engineer
- Rosenthal Tee (born c. 1988), Philippine fashion designer
- Tee Jing Yi (郑清忆; born 1991), Malaysian badminton player
- Tee Kai Wun (鄭凱文; born 2000), Malaysian badminton player
- Matt Tee (fl. 1996–present), British civil servant
- Markwin Tee (fl. 2006), Philippine ten-pin bowler

=== Stage name or other professional name ===
- Richard Tee (Richard Edward Ten Ryk; 1943–1993), American singer and pianist
- Willie Tee (Wilson Turbinton; 1944–2007), American keyboardist
- Larry Tee (Lawrence Thom; born 1959), American DJ
- Tommy Tee (Tommy Flåten; born 1971), Norwegian record producer
- Brian Tee (Jae-beom Takata; born 1977), American actor
- Gilmore Tee (Gilmore Qhawe Khumalo; born 1990), Zimbabwean media figure
- Howie Tee (Howard Thompson; fl. 1985–present), American DJ
- Jay Tee (James Trujillo; fl. 1989–present), American rapper

== See also ==
- Helen Damrosch Tee-Van (1893–1976), American illustrator
- John Tee-Van (1897–1967), American ichthyologist and zoologist
- Joseph Woah-Tee (1948–2009), Liberian politician
- Cindy McTee (born 1953), American composer
