= Giacomo Boni (archaeologist) =

Italian politician

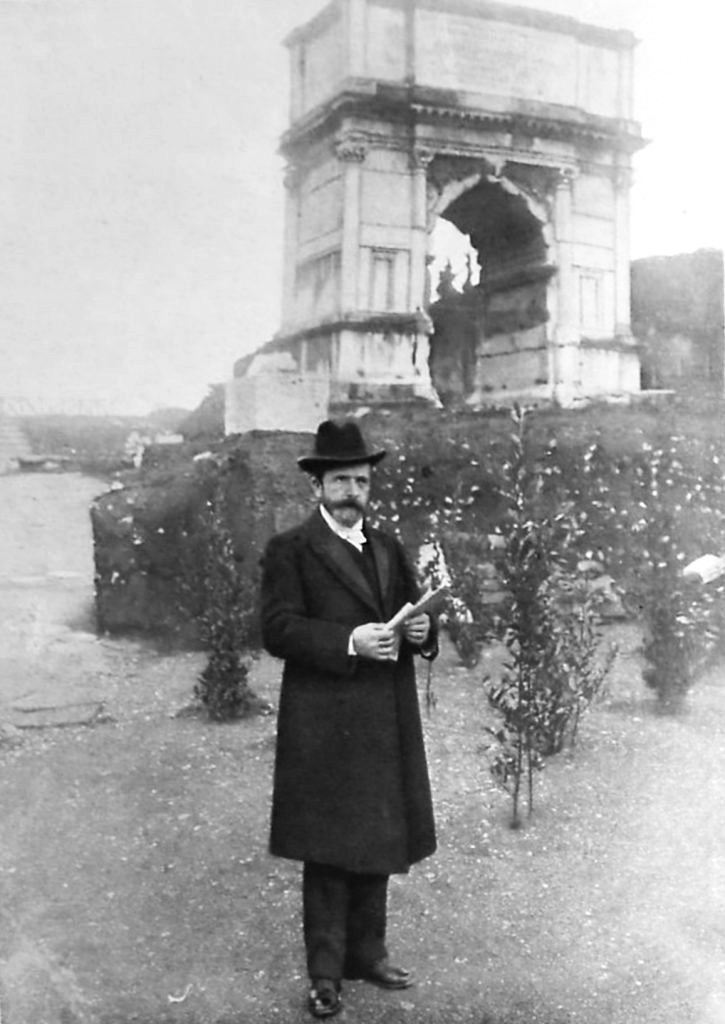
- Giacomo Boni by the Arch of Titus in Rome
- Born: 25 April 1859; Venice, Austrian Empire
- Died: 10 July 1925; Rome, Italy
- Education: Accademia di Belle Arti
- Scientific career
- Fields: Archaeology

Giacomo Boni (25 April 1859 – 10 July 1925) was an Italian archaeologist specializing in Roman architecture. He is most famous for his work in the Roman Forum.

== Life ==
Born in Venice, Boni studied architecture at the Accademia di Belle Arti in his native city and later moved to Rome. During World War I Boni participated as a soldier, and was elected senator in 1923, at which time he embraced fascism.

Boni died in Rome, and he is buried in the Orti Farnesiani on the Palatine Hill.

== Work ==
=== Venice ===
His early work as an architect involved him in the restoration of the Doge's Palace. During this time he demonstrated his technical skills. In the 1880s, Boni met Horatio Brown, who became his colleague in a shared passion for antiquities.

=== Rome ===
In 1888 Boni went to Rome, where in 1898 the Ministro della Pubblica Istruzione G. Baccelli named him director of excavations in the Forum Romanum. Boni directed this important project from 1898 until his death in 1925. He was interested in the stratigraphy of the Forum, an important advance in the science of Roman archaeology.

His excavations led to many important discoveries, including the Iron Age necropolis near the Temple of Antoninus and Faustina, the Lapis Niger, the Regia, Galleria Cesaree, Horrea Agrippiana, the Temple of Vesta, and other monuments. In 1907 Boni also worked on the slope of the Palatine Hill where he discovered the Mundus (tholos-cistern), a complex of tunnels leading to the Casa dei Grifi, the so-called Aula Isiaca, the so-called Baths of Tiberius and the base of a hut under the peristyle of the Domus Flavia.

The excavations were interrupted by the outbreak of World War I and resumed in 1916. He engaged art historian and archaelogist Eva Tea first as his field assistant and then personal assistant. Boni appointed Tea to be his heir, and after his death in 1925 she became responsible for collecting and organizing his papers, published a romanticised biography of her mentor in 1932.

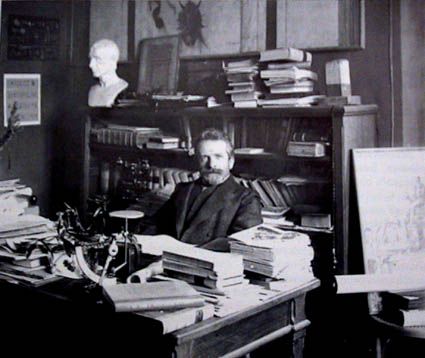
Giacomo Boni in his study

== Roman religion and fascism ==
Boni developed a strong interest in the ancient Roman religion and wished to see it revived and some of its rituals restored and adopted by the Italian state. When the National Fascist Party came to power he viewed it as a chance for a pagan revival. He viewed fascism as connected to ancient Rome and agreed with Benito Mussolini's claim that fascism was a sort of continuation of the Roman Empire. Mussolini in turn supported Boni and appointed him as a senator. Boni's role in fascism would however not last long, as he died in 1925 and only lived through a few years of the fascist state. He was buried on the Palatine Hill in an extraordinary ceremony organized by the regime. He is considered an early figure in what scholars later would label as "sacred fascism".

== Selected publications ==
- Boni, Giacomo (1898). The Lagoons of Venice.
- Boni, Giacomo (1898). Studi danteschi in America.
- Aedes Vestae. 1900.
- Boni, Giacomo (1900). "IX.—The Niger Lapis in the Comitium at Rome". Archaeologia. 57 (1): 175–184. doi:10.1017/S0261340900011437.
- "Trajan's Column". Proceedings of the British Academy, 1907–1908. 3: 93–98.
