= Mr. T (disambiguation) =

Mr. T (born 1952) is an American actor and former bodyguard.

Mr. T or Mister T may also refer to:

== People ==
- Nguyễn Cường (born 1989), or Mr. T, Vietnamese beatboxer
- Denis Thatcher (1915–2003), husband of British Prime Minister Margaret Thatcher, herself known as "Mrs. T"
- Tom Tolbert (born 1965), American sports radio personality
- Stanley Turrentine (1934–2000), American jazz saxophonist

== Music ==
- Mr. T (album), a 1981 album by Conway Twitty
- El Que Sabe, Sabe, an album by Tego Calderón, originally set to be titled Mr. T
- "Mr T", a song on the Regurgitator's 1997 album Unit
- "Mr. T", a Westside Gunn song off of the album Flygod

== Others ==
- Mr. T (comics)
- Mister T (TV series), an animated series based on the actor
- Mr & Mrs T, a line of drink mixers owned by Dr Pepper Snapple Group, Inc.
- Mr. T and Tina, an American TV series starring Pat Morita
- Mister T, a character representing the letter T from the children's television series The Letter People
- Mr. T, the main character from blaxploitation movie Trouble Man
