= Trustees Executors and Agency Company =

Trustees Executors and Agency Company (TEA) was the first trustee company formed in Australia. It carried on unexciting business for its first 90 years, before collapsing after an excursion into bad property deals in the early 1980s.

The Trustees Executors and Agency Company (Canberra) Limited was renamed in 2014 to ANZ Ilp Pty Ltd.

TEA was established by William Templeton in 1878 when he perceived a need for wealthy or moderately wealthy people to have a good executor after their death. The company's formation required a special act of parliament because such matters had previously only been handled by individuals. The company floated in 1879 with tight restrictions on the capital investments it could make and on how many shares any one person could control. Those shareholding limits had the effect of making the board and management largely self-perpetuating, since so many shareholders would have to act together to effect change.

In the 1970s the labour-intensive nature of the business was putting profits under pressure and TEA came up with the idea of offering a money market deposit service for clients, on which it would make a margin. If they actively solicited funds they would have had to prepare a costly prospectus, so the service was just quietly hinted at, letting clients request it.

These client deposits took off in a big way, growing to some $133 million by 1982. Yet what was supposed to be money market investments was by the 1980s being invested in property construction ventures, among them for instance the prominent apartment building The Quay overlooking Sydney Cove. Much of this activity was kept off the company balance sheet, so shareholders saw profits rising (often only due to revaluations) without really knowing the basis. Complacency at board level meant the board also had little idea what management was doing.

It was not until 1983 that the board had a good overview of the property ventures, at which point, depending on the basis for valuing the properties, the company was close to insolvent. The board hoped for a merger with Perpetual Trustees (which could have suited Perpetual since a trustee company failure might have resulted in new regulations on them) but in the end TEA was wound up. Its trustee operations were taken over by the ANZ Bank and very little information on the collapse was provided to shareholders, or the public, until a government inspector's report in 1990. The lengthy criminal investigation into the activities of directors and others involved in the collapse was conducted by two detectives from the Victoria Police Fraud Squad, Detective Sergeant Jim Holcombe and Senior Detective Mick Nott.

Chief executive Peter Bunning had been chiefly responsible for the property strategy along with his colleague, financial advisor/accountant Leigh Jamison. Both Bunning and Jamison were jailed for falsifying TEA's accounts and for secret commissions in the course of the deals. As Trevor Sykes remarks, despite all the corporate goings-on in Australia in the 1980s, Bunning was the only person of prominence to be jailed actually within that decade itself.
