= Big T =

Big T may refer to:

- Thurl Bailey (born 1961), American basketball player
- Ahmed Johnson (born 1963), American professional wrestler
- Big T, rapper who appeared in the song "Wanna Be a Baller" by Lil' Troy
- Big T, contestant on season 7 of the Australian version of The X Factor
- Big T, YouTuber

== See also ==
- The Big T.N.T. Show
