= Eva Tea =

- Born: Evangelina Tea; February 18, 1886; Biella, Italy
- Died: July 29, 1971 (aged 85); Tregnago, Italy
- Education: Sapienza University of Rome, Università Cattolica del Sacro Cuore
- Occupation: Art historian

Evangelina Tea (18 February 1886 – 29 July 1971) was an Italian professor of medieval and modern art history.

Born in Biella, Piedmont, on 18 February 1886, Tea's father was a medical doctor and her mother was Anna Ricci, director of the Asilo Umberto I nursery school in Vercelli. She was raised in Verona and graduated from the University of Padua in 1911. She completed her graduate studies in art history from the Sapienza University of Rome in 1916, studying under Adolfo Venturi.

Tea taught in Rome at a liceo classico and was an ispettrice di belle arti (Inspector of Fine Arts) in Ravenna as a Sovrintendenza ai Monumenti, and in Venice, Trento and the Roman Forum. It was at the forum that she met Giacomo Boni. While he asked her to work as a secretary, they eventually conducted excavations together including that of the Basilica of Santa Maria Antiqua. Boni appointed Tea as his heir, and when he died in 1925 she took responsibility for his estate and papers. She published a biography of Boni in 1932.

After working as a librarian at the Accademia di Belle Arti di Brera in Milan for a time, in 1926 she enrolled in a free course at the Catholic University of Milan. She began working with Giuseppe Polvara (1884–1950) in 1929 to organize the Beato Angelico School, an art school for the training of new Christian artists. For many years, she worked with this avant-garde institution of artistic and political reform, however, when the school transformed into a religious institution subject to juridical conditions, she decided to focus on her students. The Scuola Beato Angelico eventually moved its headquarters to viale San Gimignano; she, however, remained at its old location and founded the Opera di assistenza agli artisti e alle modelle. Upon completion of the course at the Catholic University of Milan, she was first named to the department of Art Criticism and then to the department of Art History and Magisterium. Her most important contributions are found in the Arte Cristiana publications from 1927 to 1962.

She worked on the magazines Arte Cristiana, Theatrica, and Vita e pensiero, and the newspapers Corriere della Sera and Italia. Tea wrote the collection Quaderni dell'artista, and Umanesimo cristiano, Chiesa e impero nell'arte dei primi secoli Cristiani, Meditazioni su Giotto, and Paolo Veronese.

In 1964, she fractured her femur and her health slowly declined. She retired to live with her sister in 1967 and died in 1971.

== Selected works ==
- Giacomo Boni nella vita del suo tempo. Milan: Casa editrice Ceschina, 1932
- La vita di Cristo. Bergamo: Istituto italiano d'arti grafiche, 1960
- Medioevo. Storia Universale Dell'arte; v. 3. Torino : Unione Tipografico-Editrice Torinese, 1957
- Pitture e sculture nelle chiese di Milano. Milano: Banco ambrosiano, 1951
- Preistoria, Civiltà Extraeuropee. Storia Universale Dell'arte; v. 1. Turin: Unione tipografico-editrice torinese, 1953
- Quattrocento e Cinquecento. Storia Universale Dell'arte v. 4. Turin Unione tipografico-editrice torinese, 1964
- Architetture e decorazioni nelle chiese di Milano: con 48 tavole fuori testo. (Milan: Officina d'Arti Grafiche E. Milli), 1952
- and Mino Borghi. Arte italiana: critica e storia. Milan: Libreria scientifica universitaria, 1941

For a complete bibliography, see Albricci, G. "Bibliografia di Eva Tea." Arte Cristiana 65 (1977): 7-8.
