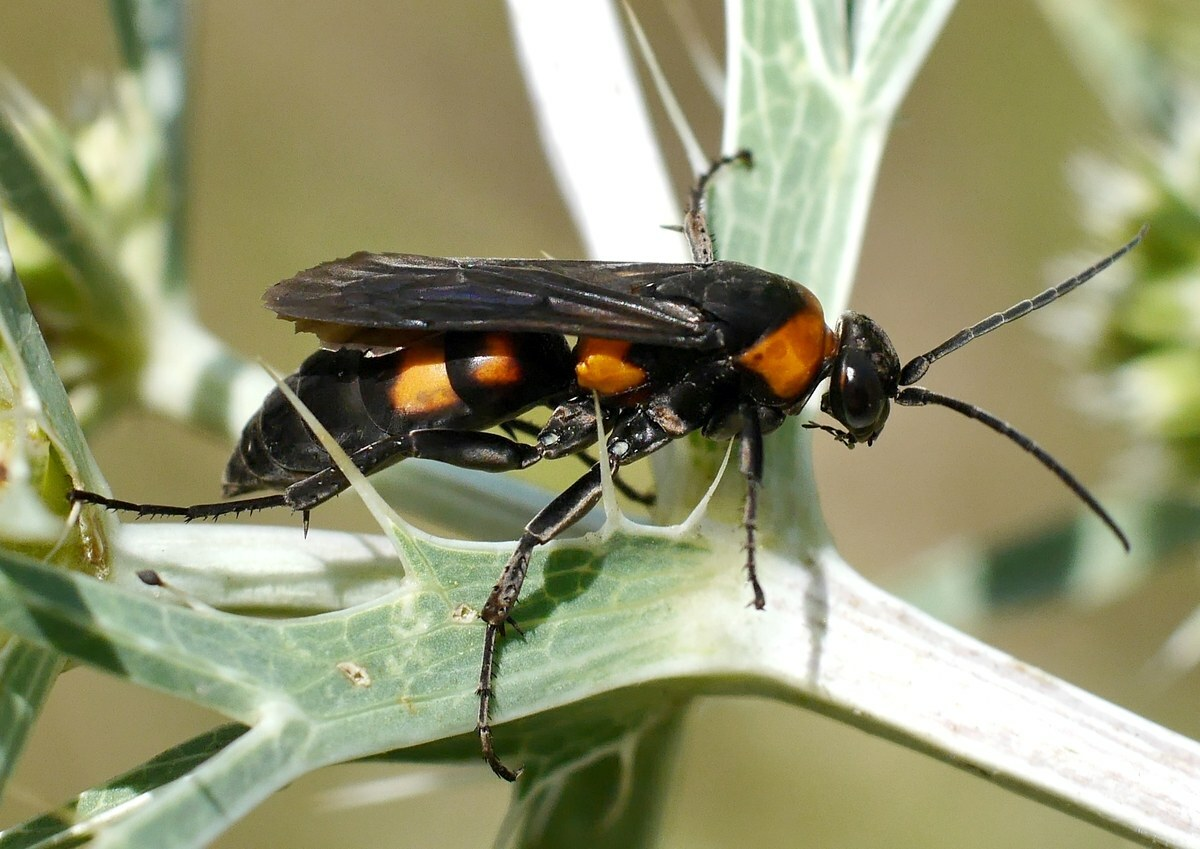
- Eoferreola erythraea, Ukraine

Scientific classification
- Kingdom: Animalia
- Phylum: Arthropoda
- Class: Insecta
- Order: Hymenoptera
- Family: Pompilidae
- Genus: Eoferreola; Arnold, 1935

= Eoferreola =

Genus of wasps

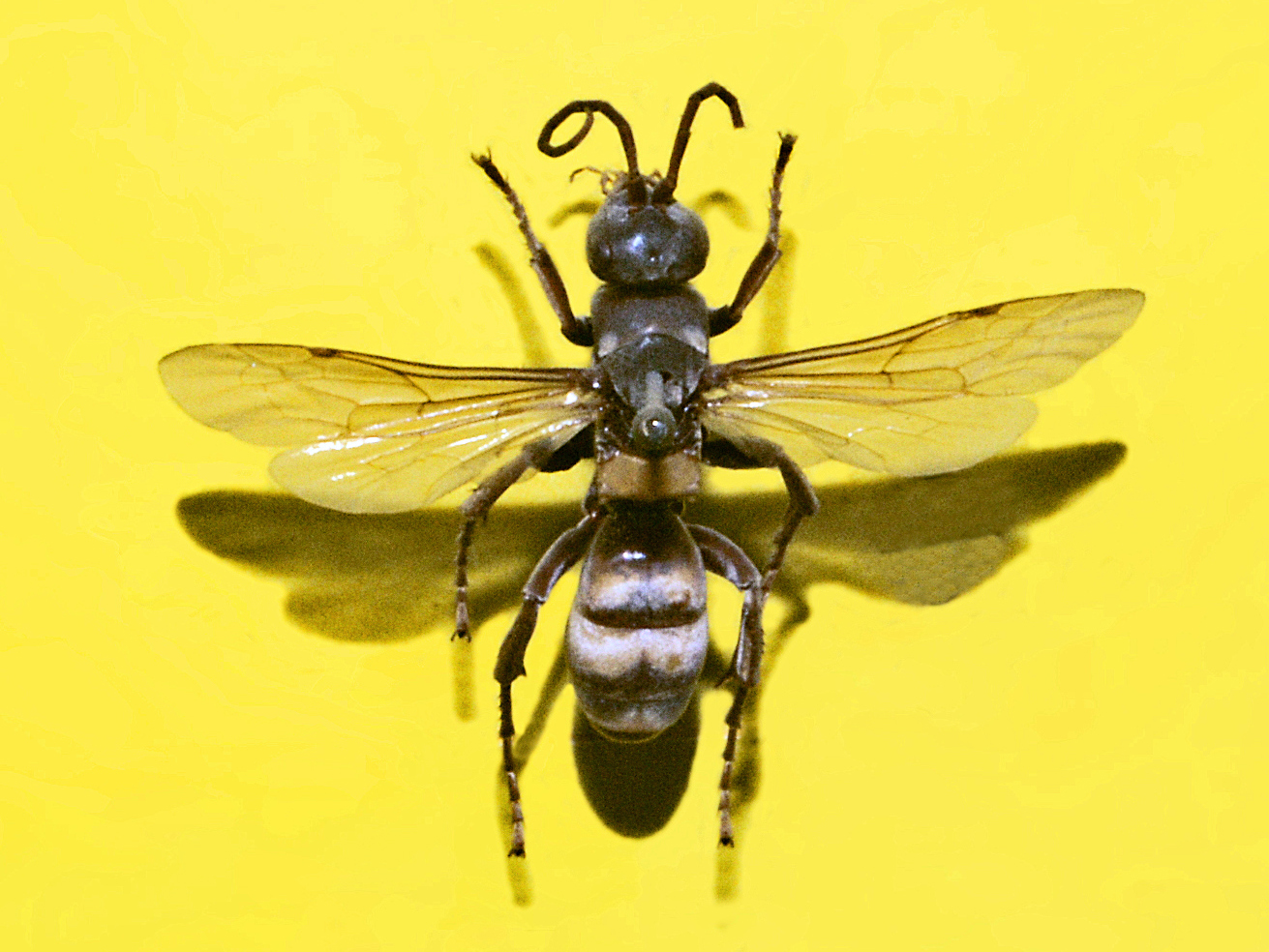
Eoferreola thoracica

Eoferreola is a genus of spider wasps in the family Pompilidae. There are about 13 described species in Eoferreola, found in Europe, North Africa, and western Asia.

== Species ==
These 13 species belong to the genus Eoferreola:

- Eoferreola alwahaibii Schmid-Egger, 2018
- Eoferreola anatolica Priesner, 1973
- Eoferreola claripennis (Priesner, 1966)
- Eoferreola cyrenaica (Guiglia, 1941)
- Eoferreola erythraea (Pallas, 1773)
- Eoferreola filiantennata Wolf & Mozcar, 1972
- Eoferreola manticata (Pallas, 1771)
- Eoferreola mixta (Tournier, 1895)
- Eoferreola neftae Schmid-Egger in Wahis & Schmid-Egger, 2002
- Eoferreola rhombica (Christ, 1791) (Europe)
- Eoferreola syraensis (Radoszkowski, 1889)
- Eoferreola thoracica (Rossi, 1794)
- Eoferreola variabilis (Eversmann, 1849)
