= Tee (given name) =

Tee is a given name. Notable people with the name include:

- Tee A (born 1974), Nigerian comedian
- Tee Corinne (1943–2006), American photographer, author
- Tee Franklin, comic book writer
- Tee Joe Gonzales (1862–1940), American politician and businessman
- Tee Grizzley (born 1994), American rapper and video game streamer
- Tee Higgins (born 1999), American football player
- Tee Jay (1962–2006), Ghanaian-born British boxer
- Tee Lopes (born 1987), Portuguese-American composer and sound designer
- Tee Tee Luce (1895–1982), Burmese philanthropist
- Tee Martin (born 1978), American football coach and former player
- Tee Masaniai, American Samoan politician
- Tee Mitchell (1916–1970), American baseball player
- Tee Scott (1948–1995), American DJ

== See also ==
- Tee-Y Mix, Nigerian record producer
