= Tea Lake =

- Interactive map of Tea Lake
- Location: Oscoda County, Michigan
- Coordinates: 44.841°N 84.296°W
- Type: Lake
- Average depth: 20 ft (6.1 m)
- Max. depth: 70 ft (21 m)
- Settlements: Greenwood Township

Tea Lake, also known as Tee Lake, is a natural freshwater kettle-type lake located in Greenwood Township, Oscoda County, Michigan. The lake covers roughly 216 acres with a maximum depth of 70 feet (21.3 m) and an average depth of roughly 20 feet (6 m). The lake and its surrounding watershed were historically inhabited by multiple Native peoples, with French settlement occurring throughout the 18th and 19th century. The lake provides habitat to a number of species of flora and fauna.

== History ==
Tea Lake, like many inland lakes of northern Michigan, was formed during the Last Ice Age during the recession of the Laurentide Ice Sheet. Multiple indigenous groups, including the Ojibwe, Ottawa, and Chippewa, utilized the lake and its surrounding habitat for hunting, fishing, and foraging. They also harvested ice from the lake to preserve their harvest. The land including the lake and the surrounding area were ceded to the United States of America in the Treaty of Saginaw 1819. The lake attracted loggers, trappers, and eventually residents. In 1881, Oscoda County was established, and further land development occurred around the lake, primarily for residential purposes. Since the mid 20th century, the lake has become a popular location for boaters, anglers, and divers.

== Habitat ==
The lake and its surrounding streams provide habitat for numerous species, including:

- Bluegill
- Largemouth bass
- Smallmouth bass
- Northern pike
- Muskellunge
- Walleye
- Yellow perch
- Crappie
- Common loon
- Wood duck
- Canada goose
- Great blue heron
- Bald eagle
- Belted kingfisher
- White-tailed deer
- Beaver
- Otter
- Muskrat
- Raccoon
- Red fox
- Black bear
- Squirrel
- Coyote
- Painted turtle
- Snapping turtle
- Green frog
- Spring peeper
- American bullfrog
- Crayfish
- Mussels
- Snails
