= ΔT =

The symbols Δt and ΔT (spoken as "delta T") are commonly used in a variety of contexts.

== Time ==
- ΔT (timekeeping) the difference between two time scales, Universal Time and Terrestrial Time, which results from a drift in the length of a day
- The interval of time used in determining velocity
- The increment between successive nerve impulses

== Temperature ==
- To mean a difference in temperature including thermodynamic temperature, may occur in
  - Discussions of climate change
  - Discussions of heat transfer
  - Discussions of the effects of thermal gradients

== See also ==
- Delta time (disambiguation)
- Finite difference for the mathematics of the finite difference operator denoted as Δ
- Delta (letter) for the Greek letter Δ
- ∂ for the mathematical symbol used in the notation "∂T"
