= Meall na Teanga =

Mountain in Highland, Scotland

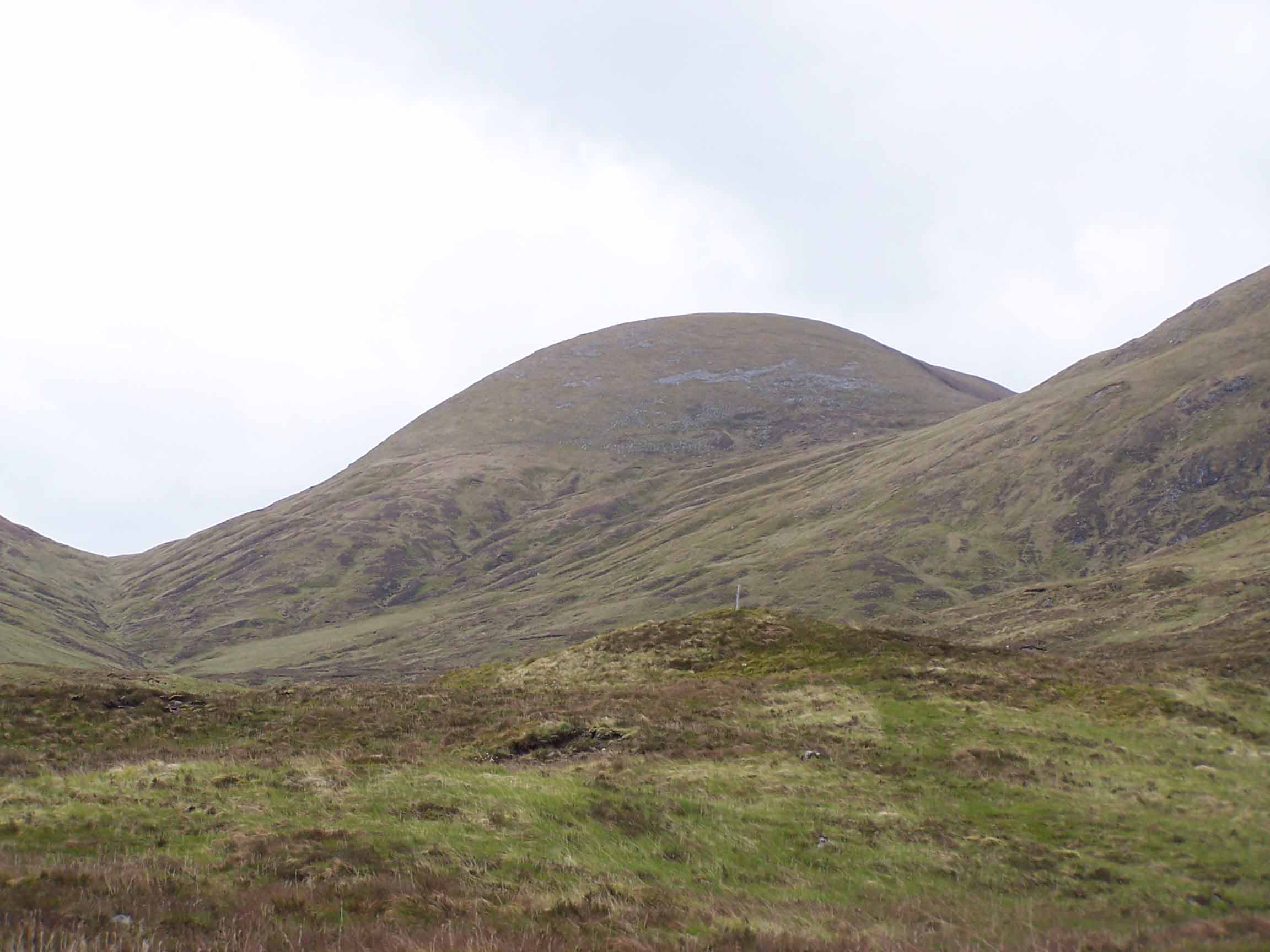
- Approaching Meall na Teanga up the path to the Cam Bealach from the Cia-aig waterfall.

Highest point
- Elevation: 918 m (3,012 ft)
- Prominence: 303 m (994 ft)
- Parent peak: Sron a' Choire Ghairbh
- Listing: Munro, Marilyn
- Coordinates: 56.9888°N 4.9309°W

Naming
- English translation: Hill of the Tongue
- Language of name: Gaelic
- Pronunciation: Scottish Gaelic: [ˈmjaulˠ̪ nə ˈtʰʲɛŋɡə] English approximation: MYOWL-nə-TYEN-gə

Geography
- Location: Highland, Scotland
- Parent range: Northwest Highlands
- OS grid: NN220924
- Topo map: OS Landranger 34, OS Explorer 400

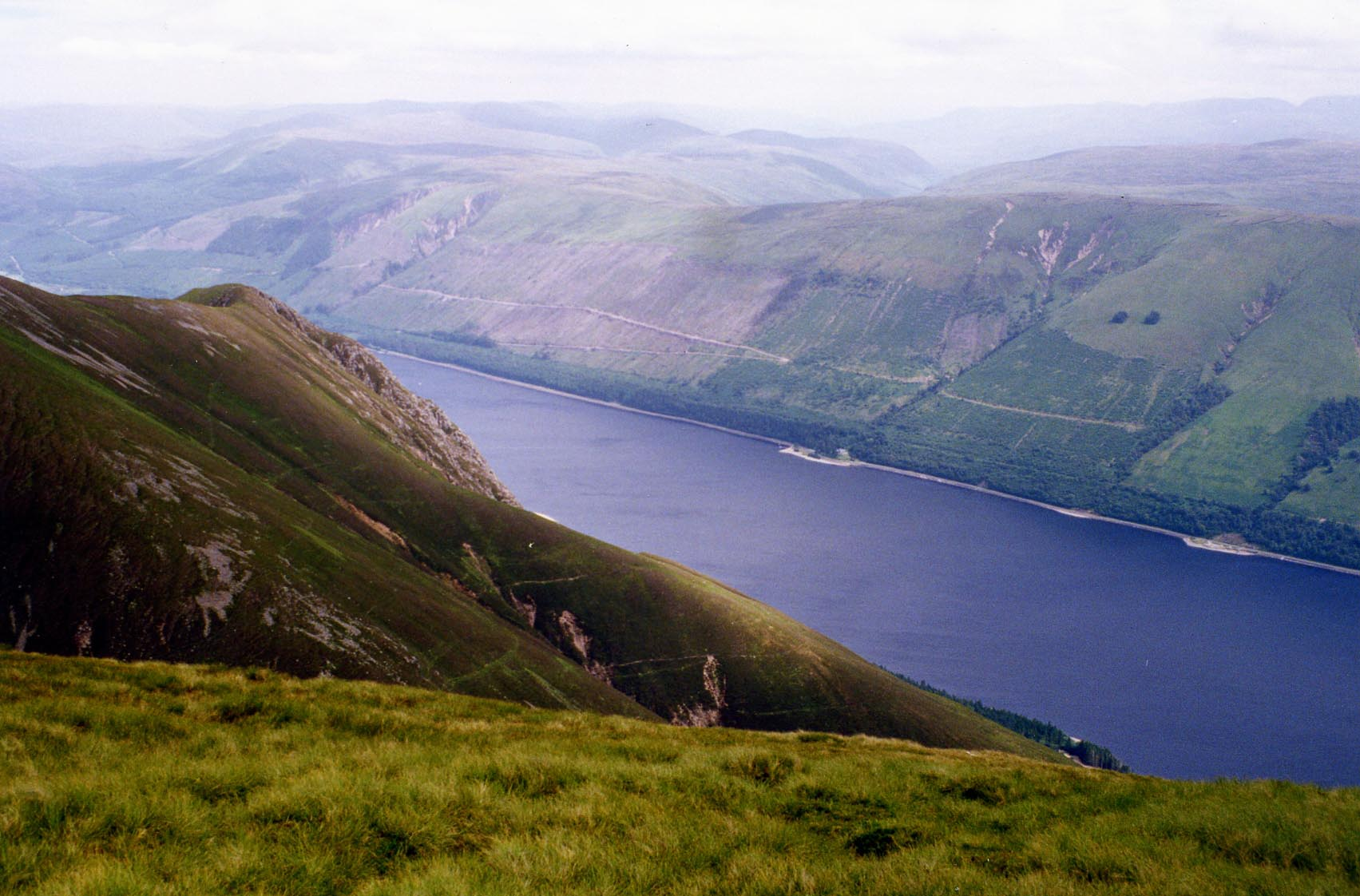
Loch Lochy from the summit of Meall na Teanga.

Meall na Teanga is a Scottish mountain located in the Highland council area, 11 km (7 mi) north of Spean Bridge.

== Overview ==
Meall na Teanga is situated on the northern side of Loch Lochy and is closely associated with the adjacent Munro of Sròn a' Choire Ghairbh which lies two kilometres to the north across the Cam Bealach ("crooked pass"). The two mountains are usually ascended together. Meall na Teanga is seen prominently from the A82 road on the opposite bank of Loch Lochy, showing steep slopes which have the conifer plantations of the South Laggan Forest below the 300 metre contour.

The hill just qualifies as a Munro by four metres, reaching a height of 918 m (3,012 ft). In the original 1891 version of Munro's Tables, Meall na Teanga was listed as a subsidiary "Top" of Sròn a' Choire Ghairbh. It was promoted to Munro status when the tables were updated in 1921, despite continuing doubts as to whether it had sufficient height. The hill's name translates from the Gaelic as "Hill of the Tongue". This refers to one of the hill's ridges: either the long tongue-like western ridge which curves round two fine corries, or the steep buttressing spur which rises from the loch to the summit. The hill is sometimes referred to in the anglified form of "Tango".

== Geography ==
Meall na Teanga is made up of a series of short ridges and one longer one and has three fine corries on its slopes. The longer western ridge runs for two kilometres before dropping down steep grassy slopes to the head of Gleann Cia-aig. It runs along the rim of two large north-facing corries. Coire Odhar Mor and Coire Odhar Beag are both steep and craggy, and their streams form the headwaters of the Abhainn Chia-aig which flows west then south around the mountain to join the River Arkaig in the Great Glen. The shorter north-east ridge goes over the lesser top of Meall Dubh (839 metres) before descending to the top of the Cam Beallach, which links it to the adjoining Munro of Sròn a' Choire Ghairbh.

In all, Meall na Teanga has three subsidiary tops, none of which has sufficient altitude to be regarded as Munro Tops. In addition to the already mentioned Meall Dubh, there is Meall Odhar (872 metres) which stands on the western ridge above Coire Odhar Mòr, and Meall Coire Lochain (907 metres), 600 metres south-west of the summit above the hill's third corrie Coire Lochain which has a small lochan within it. All drainage from the mountain finds its way to Loch Lochy and then to the west coast via Loch Linnhe.

== Ascents ==
The most popular ascent of Meall na Teanga is from the top of the Cam Beallach pass; from here an ascent of the adjacent Sròn a' Choire Ghairbh can also be made. The Cam Beallach can be approached from the south from the car park at the Cia-aig waterfall on the B8005 at grid reference NN176888, however the approach from the north-east starting at Laggan Locks just off the A82 at grid reference NN287963 is now more popular, now that the track to the pass through the South Laggan Forest has been cleared of logging debris by the Forestry Commission. A more interesting ascent from the Cia-aig waterfall can be undertaken by climbing the hill's western ridge from the head of Gleann Cia-aig; this route gives the opportunity to appreciate the corries on that ridge. The summit is marked by a cairn of boulders and gives views across the Great Glen towards the Grey Corries, the Aonachs and Ben Nevis.
