= Matt Tee =

Matt Tee graduated from the University of Leeds (Mathematics 1986). He was previously the Permanent Secretary for Government Communications in the Cabinet Office. After several roles in public sector communications, Tee served as the Director of Business Development at Dr Foster. He then served as the interim Director General of Communications in the Department of Health for 2006–7, before being appointed Chief Executive of NHS Direct in July 2007. Tee became Permanent Secretary for Government Communications in the Cabinet Office. In November 2010 it was announced that Tee would leave his post heading Government Communications in March 2011 following a review of the Central Office of Information. He was the first Chief Executive of the Independent Press Standards Organisation (IPSO), serving from September 2014 until March 2020.

Government offices
Preceded by Sian Jarvis, CB	Director-General, Communications (interim); Department of Health; 2006–2007	Succeeded by Sian Jarvis, CB
Preceded by Ed Lester	Chief Executive; NHS Direct; 2007 - 2008	Succeeded by Nick Chapman
Preceded by Howell James	Permanent Secretary for Government Communications; Cabinet Office; 2008 -	Incumbent
