= Charles Barnard =

Charles Barnard may refer to:

- Charles Barnard (castaway) (1781–1840), American castaway
- Charles Barnard (American football) (1915–2008), American football end
- Charles Barnard (writer) (1838–1920), American reporter, playwright and writer
- Charles A. Barnard (American football) (1880–1977), American football player and coach
- Charles A. Barnard (politician) (1907–1956), member of the Wisconsin State Assembly
- Charles R. Barnard (1883–1948), member of the Wisconsin State Assembly
- C. D. Barnard (1895–1971), British pilot

== See also ==
- Charles Bernard (disambiguation)
