= Charles R. Barnard =

American politician

Charles Ray Barnard (March 13, 1883 – July 11, 1948) was a member of the Wisconsin State Assembly.

== Biography ==
Barnard was born on March 13, 1883, in Brillion, Wisconsin. He graduated from Brillion High School. Barnard died on July 11, 1948. His nephew Charles A. Barnard also served in the Wisconsin Assembly.

== Career ==
Barnard was a member of the Assembly from 1941 until his death. Previously, he was an unsuccessful candidate for the Assembly in 1938. He was a Republican.

== See also ==
- The Political Graveyard
