= Brillion, Wisconsin =

- City
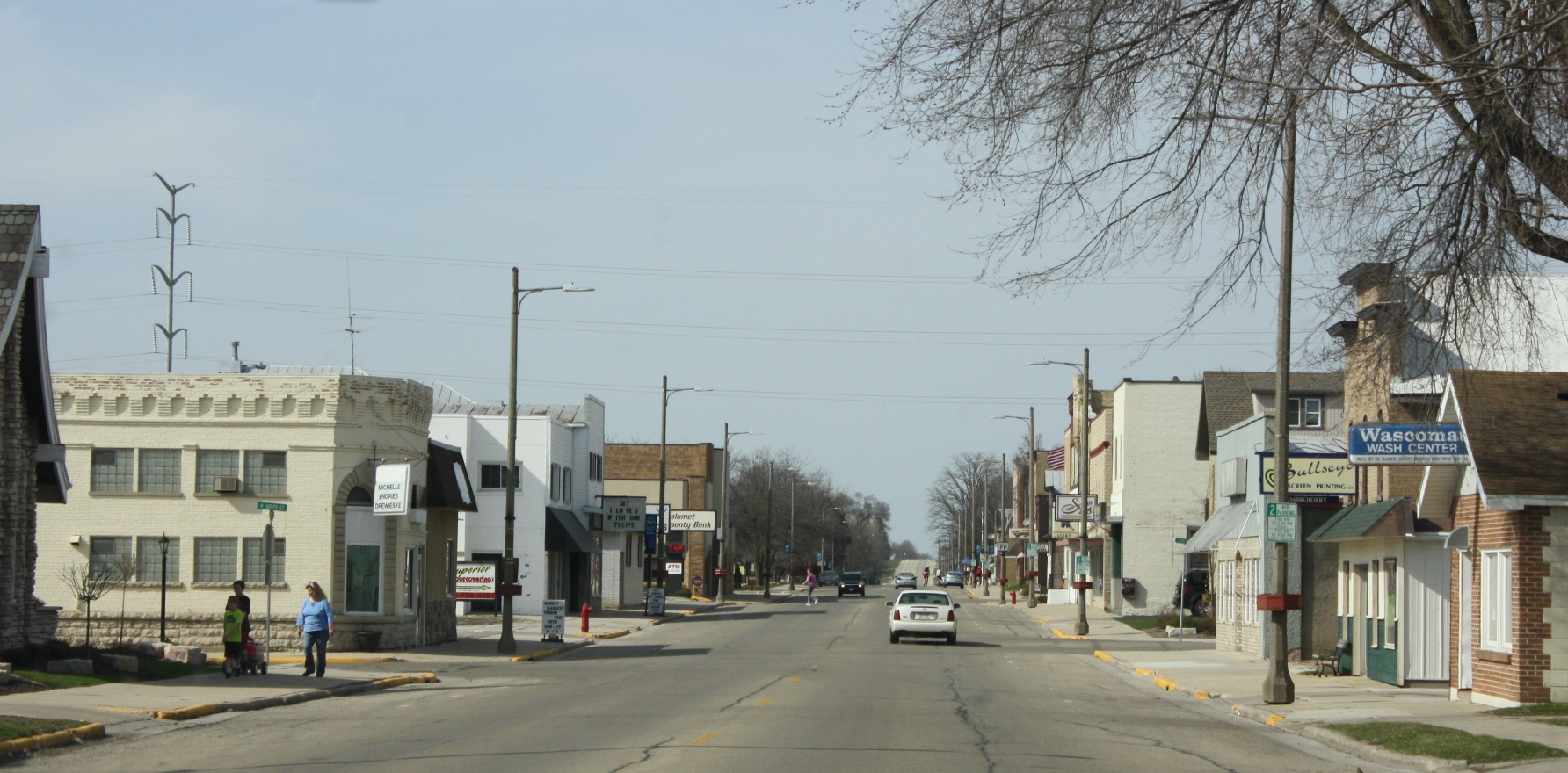

- Location of Brillion in Calumet County, Wisconsin.

- Location within Wisconsin Location within the United States
- Coordinates: 44°10′30″N 88°3′58″W
- Country: United States
- State: Wisconsin
- County: Calumet

Area
  - Total: 2.86 sq mi (7.41 km^{2})
  - Land: 2.84 sq mi (7.36 km^{2})
  - Water: 0.019 sq mi (0.05 km^{2})
- Elevation: 830 ft (253 m)

Population (2020)
  - Total: 3,262
  - Estimate (2024): 3,538
  - Density: 1,080/sq mi (418/km^{2})
- Time zone: UTC-6 (Central (CST))
  - Summer (DST): UTC-5 (CDT)
- Zip Code: 54110
- Area code: 920
- FIPS code: 55-09725
- GNIS feature ID: 1562211
- Website: www.brillionwi.gov

Brillion (/ˈbrɪljən/ BRIL-yən) is a city in Calumet County, Wisconsin, United States. The population was 3,262 as of the 2020 census. The city is located within the Town of Brillion, though it is politically independent.

== History ==
Brillion is named after the town of Brilon, in Germany.

== Geography ==
Brillion is located at 44°10′30″N 88°3′57″W (44.175114, −88.0661).

According to the United States Census Bureau, the city has a total area of 3.16 square miles (8.18 km^{2}), of which, 3.1 square miles (8.03 km^{2}) is land and 0.06 square miles (0.16 km^{2}) is water.

=== Climate ===
Climate data for Brillion, Wisconsin (1991–2020)
Month	Jan	Feb	Mar	Apr	May	Jun	Jul	Aug	Sep	Oct	Nov	Dec	Year
Mean daily maximum °F (°C)	25.6 (−3.6)	29.3 (−1.5)	40.5 (4.7)	54.0 (12.2)	67.5 (19.7)	77.1 (25.1)	81.5 (27.5)	79.2 (26.2)	72.0 (22.2)	58.2 (14.6)	43.6 (6.4)	31.2 (−0.4)	55.0 (12.8)
Daily mean °F (°C)	17.7 (−7.9)	20.7 (−6.3)	31.3 (−0.4)	43.6 (6.4)	56.1 (13.4)	66.4 (19.1)	70.4 (21.3)	67.8 (19.9)	60.5 (15.8)	48.2 (9.0)	35.6 (2.0)	24.3 (−4.3)	45.2 (7.3)
Mean daily minimum °F (°C)	9.8 (−12.3)	12.2 (−11.0)	22.1 (−5.5)	33.2 (0.7)	44.8 (7.1)	55.6 (13.1)	59.2 (15.1)	56.3 (13.5)	49.0 (9.4)	38.1 (3.4)	27.7 (−2.4)	17.3 (−8.2)	35.4 (1.9)
Average precipitation inches (mm)	1.36 (35)	1.04 (26)	1.87 (47)	3.01 (76)	3.91 (99)	4.52 (115)	3.72 (94)	3.28 (83)	3.13 (80)	2.81 (71)	2.02 (51)	1.55 (39)	32.22 (816)
Average snowfall inches (cm)	12.2 (31)	9.7 (25)	5.6 (14)	2.7 (6.9)	0.0 (0.0)	0.0 (0.0)	0.0 (0.0)	0.0 (0.0)	0.0 (0.0)	0.3 (0.76)	2.2 (5.6)	10.5 (27)	43.2 (110.26)
Source: NOAA

== Demographics ==
Historical population
Census	Pop.	Note	%±
1880	278		—
1890	582		109.4%
1900	855		46.9%
1910	998		16.7%
1920	1,102		10.4%
1930	1,167		5.9%
1940	1,200		2.8%
1950	1,390		15.8%
1960	1,783		28.3%
1970	2,588		45.1%
1980	2,907		12.3%
1990	2,840		−2.3%
2000	2,937		3.4%
2010	3,148		7.2%
2020	3,262		3.6%
2024 (est.)	3,538		8.5%
U.S. Decennial Census

=== 2010 census ===
As of the census of 2010, there were 3,148 people, 1,298 households, and 851 families living in the city. The population density was 1,153.1 inhabitants per square mile (445.2/km^{2}). There were 1,349 housing units at an average density of 494.1 per square mile (190.8/km^{2}). The racial makeup of the city was 97.1% White, 0.2% African American, 0.5% Native American, 0.2% Asian, 0.9% from other races, and 1.2% from two or more races. Hispanic or Latino of any race were 2.8% of the population.

There were 1,298 households, of which 32.8% had children under the age of 18 living with them, 52.7% were married couples living together, 7.8% had a female householder with no husband present, 5.1% had a male householder with no wife present, and 34.4% were non-families. 29.7% of all households were made up of individuals, and 15.7% had someone living alone who was 65 years of age or older. The average household size was 2.42 and the average family size was 3.01.

The median age in the city was 37.8 years. 25.5% of residents were under the age of 18; 7% were between the ages of 18 and 24; 27.1% were from 25 to 44; 24.1% were from 45 to 64; and 16.2% were 65 years of age or older. The gender makeup of the city was 49.4% male and 50.6% female.

=== 2000 census ===
As of the census of 2000, there were 2,937 people, 1,155 households, and 818 families living in the city. The population density was 1,128.8 people per square mile (436.1/km^{2}). There were 1,230 housing units at an average density of 472.7 per square mile (182.7/km^{2}). The racial makeup of the city was 98.64% White, 0.72% Native American, 0.17% Asian, 0.17% from other races, and 0.31% from two or more races. 0.51% of the population were Hispanic or Latino of any race.

There were 1,155 households, out of which 32.6% had children under the age of 18 living with them, 60.6% were married couples living together, 7.7% had a female householder with no husband present, and 29.1% were non-families. 25.2% of all households were made up of individuals, and 12.3% had someone living alone who was 65 years of age or older. The average household size was 2.53 and the average family size was 3.03.

In the city, the population was spread out, with 26.3% under the age of 18, 8.2% from 18 to 24, 29.1% from 25 to 44, 21.9% from 45 to 64, and 14.6% who were 65 years of age or older. The median age was 36 years. For every 100 females, there were 95.7 males. For every 100 females age 18 and over, there were 93.2 males.

The median income for a household in the city was $46,633, and the median income for a family was $52,989. Males had a median income of $37,106 versus $24,318 for females. The per capita income for the city was $20,754. About 1.6% of families and 2.5% of the population were below the poverty line, including 0.8% of those under age 18 and 7.1% of those age 65 or over.

== Education ==
Brillion High School is the area's high school.

Trinity Lutheran School is a Christian Pre-K–8 school of the Wisconsin Evangelical Lutheran Synod in Brillion.

== Images ==
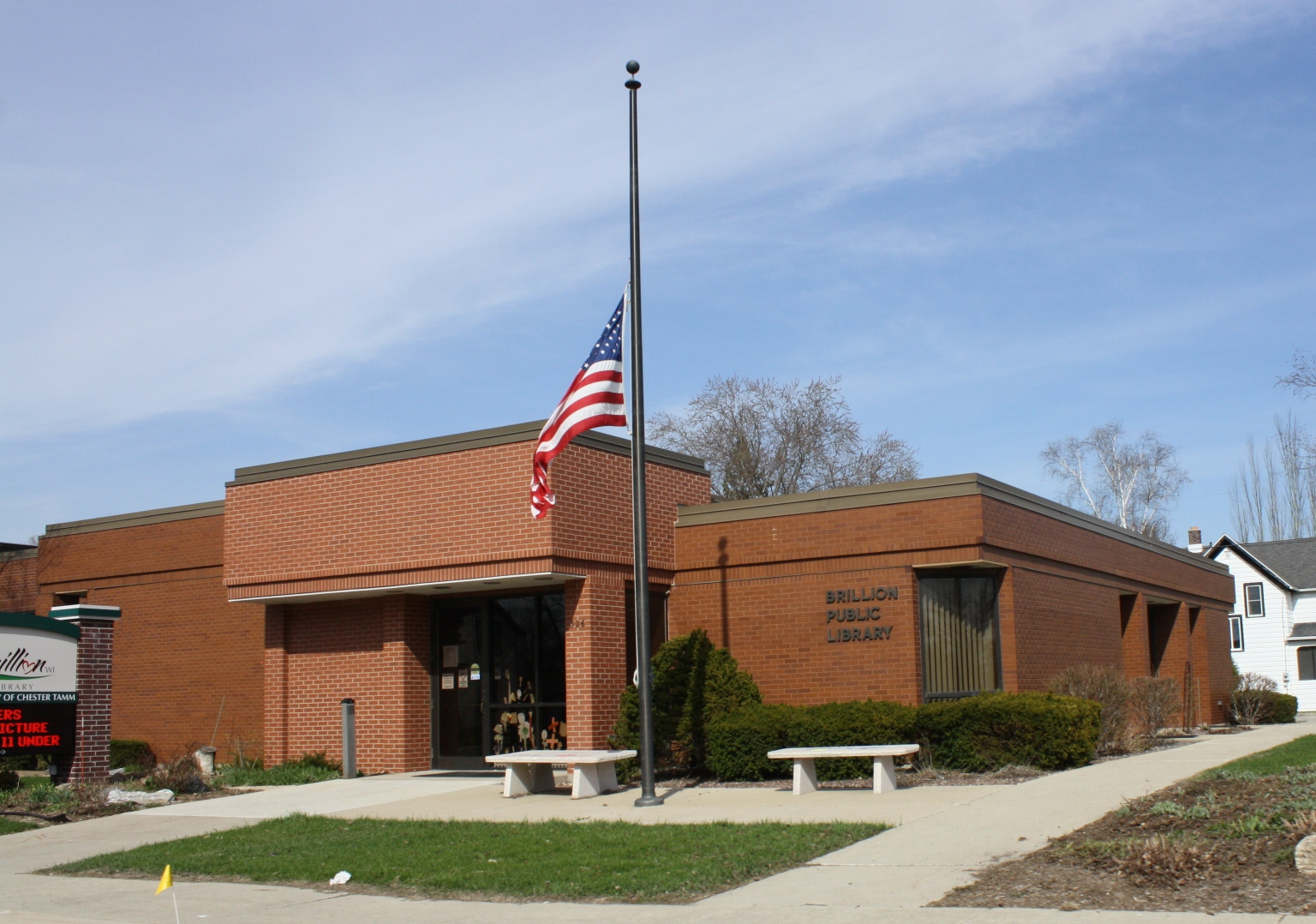
Brillion Public Library

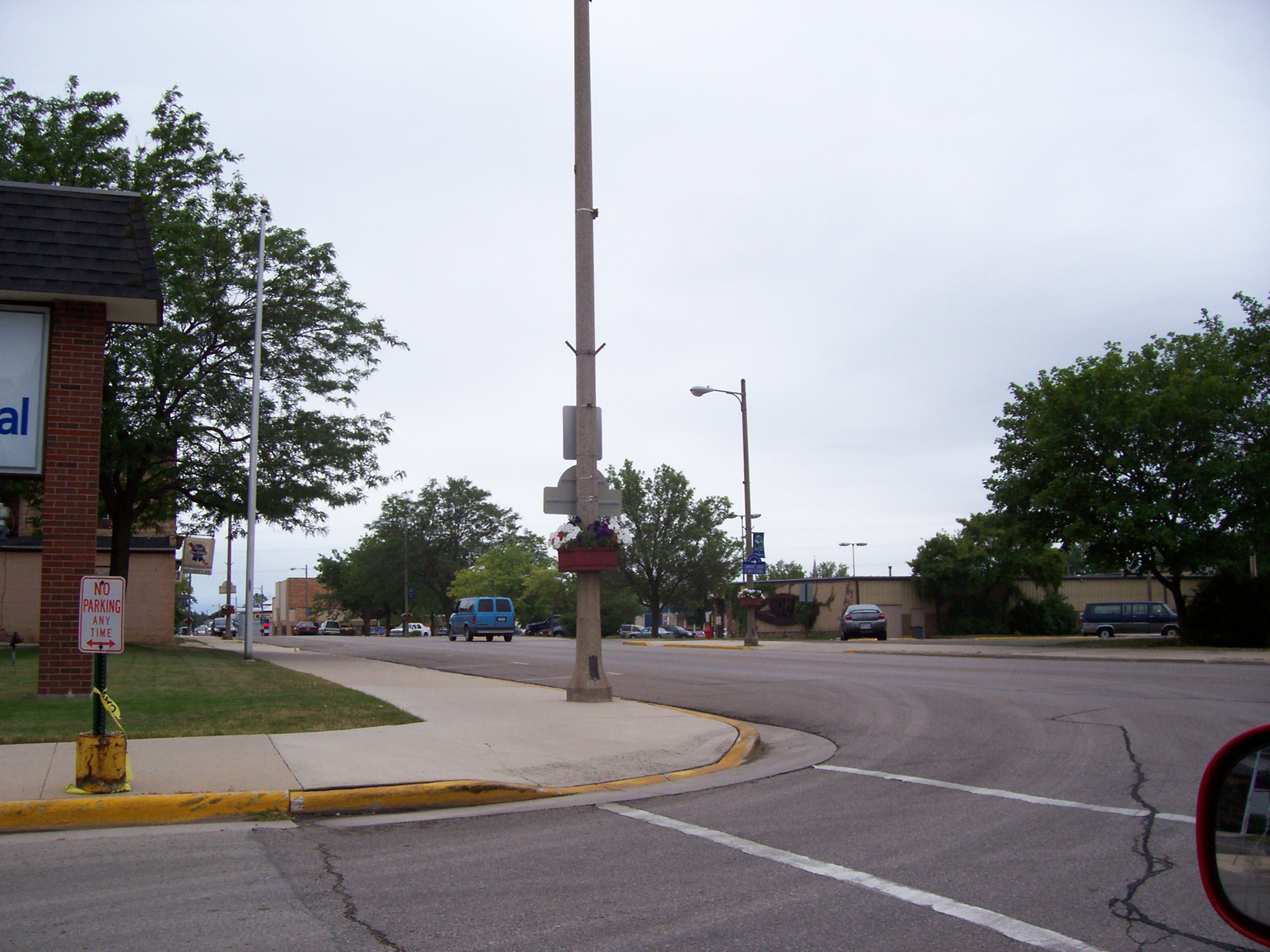
Center of Brillion

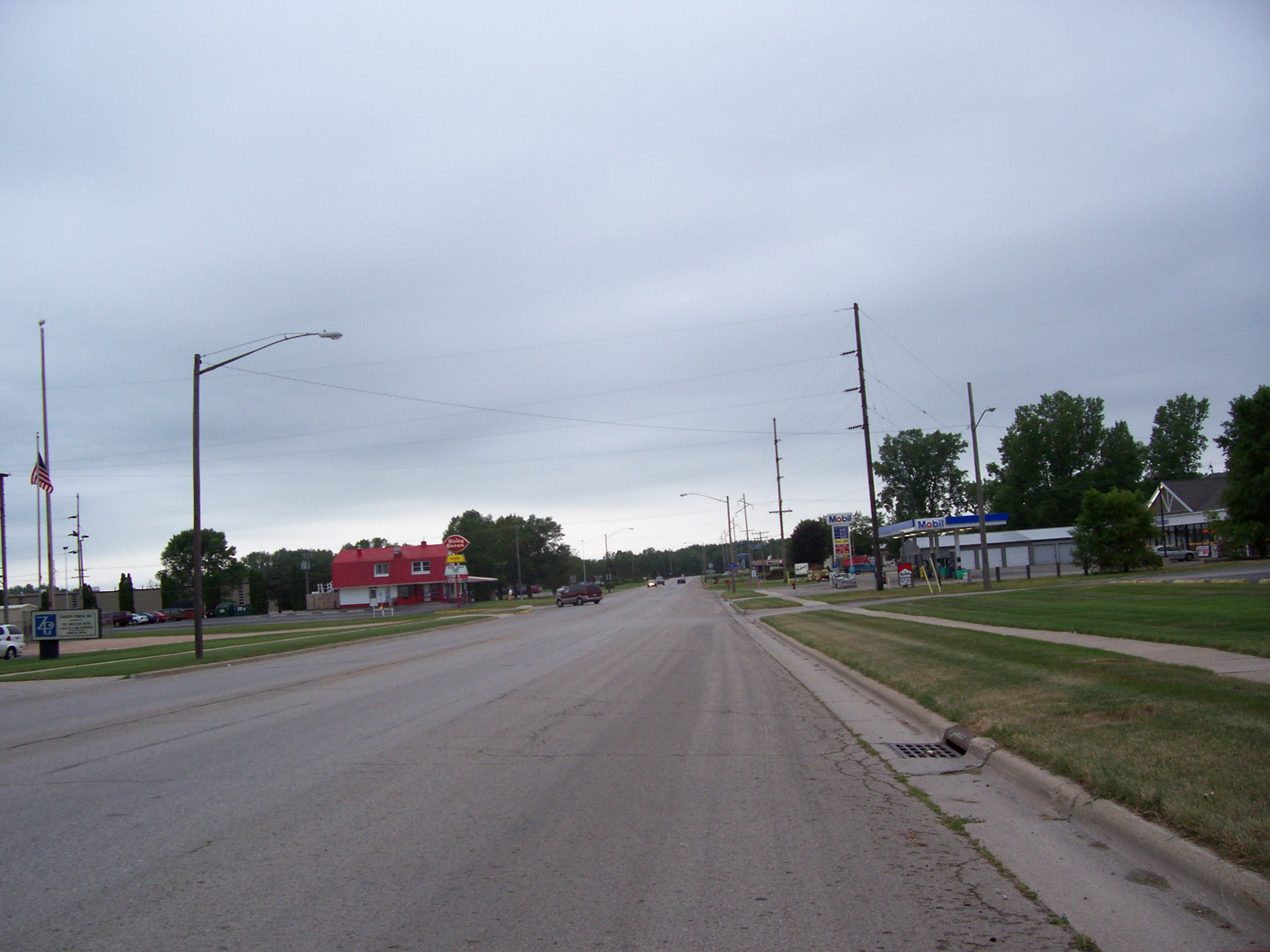
Looking west on U.S. Route 10

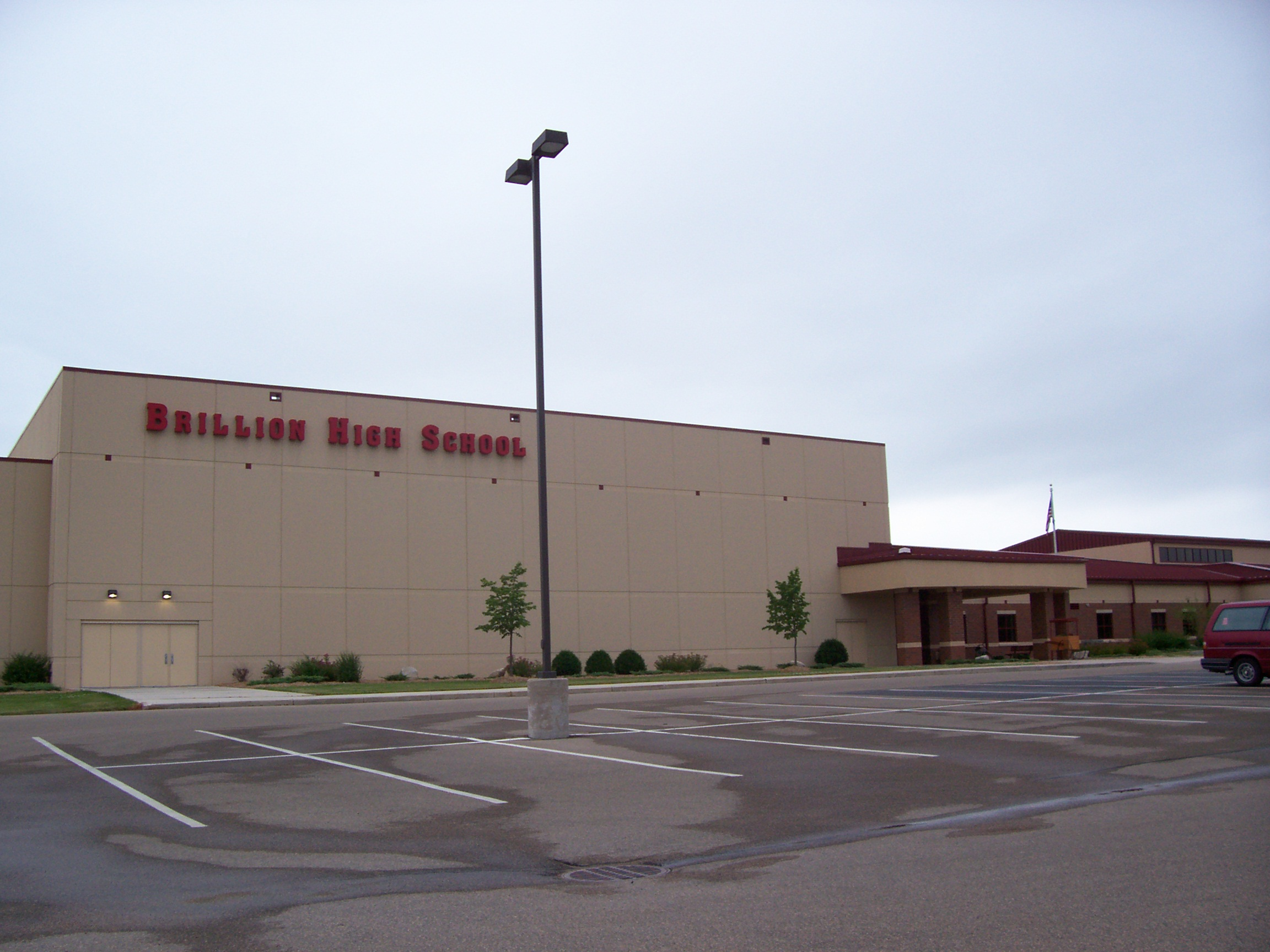
Brillion High School

== Notable people ==
- Charles A. Barnard, Wisconsin State Representative
- Charles R. Barnard, Wisconsin State Representative
- Jill Lajdziak, general manager of General Motors Saturn division
- Isaac N. McComb, Wisconsin State Representative
- Gerald L. Miller, U.S. Marine Corps general
- Victor A. Tiedjens, scientist
