= Gerald L. Miller =

United States Marine Corps general

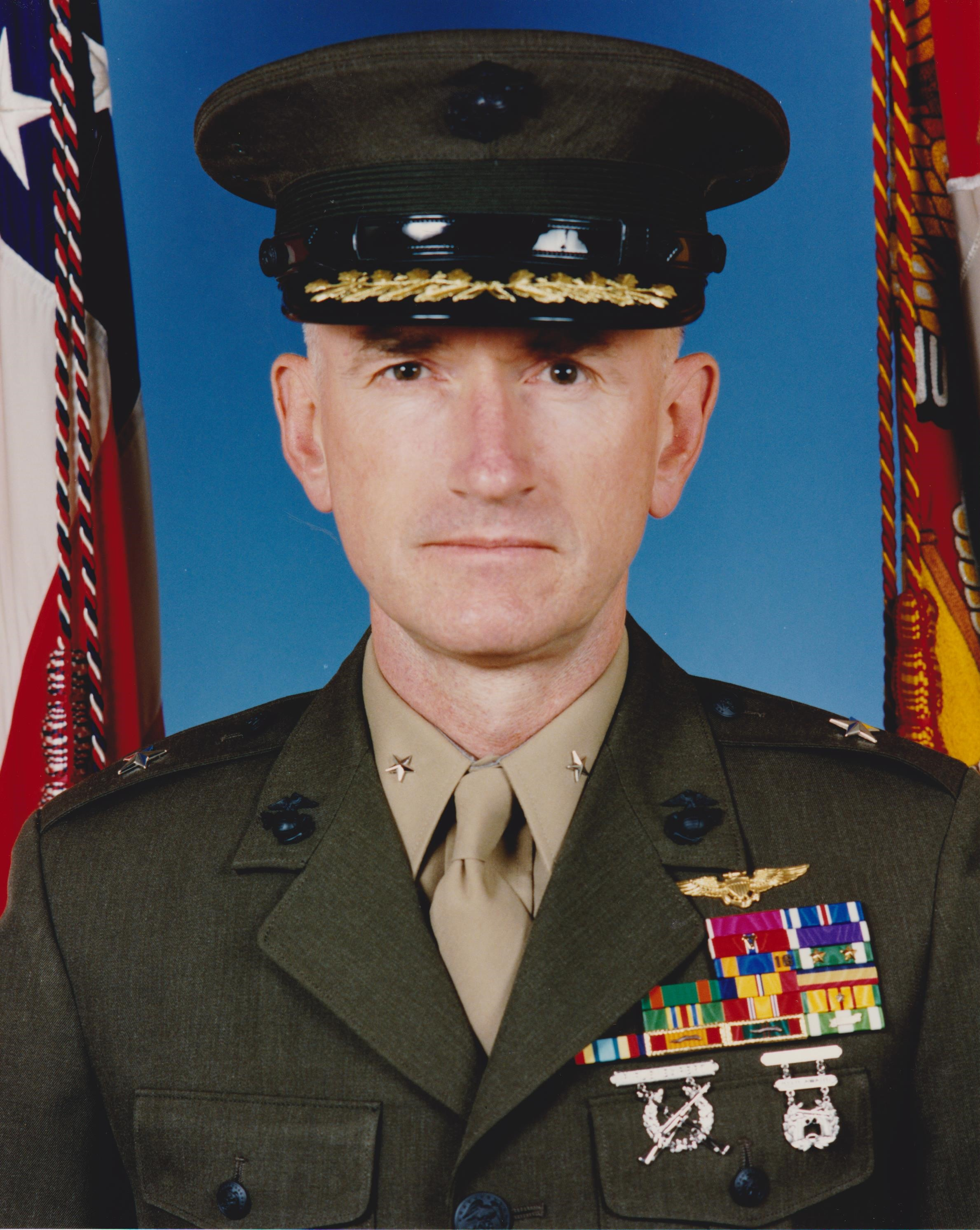
- Miller as Brigadier General, USMC
- Born: 9 September 1942; Appleton, Wisconsin, U.S.
- Died: 18 September 2024; Combined Locks, Wisconsin, U.S.
- Burial place: Arlington National Cemetery
- Military career
- Allegiance: United States of America
- Branch: United States Marine Corps
- Service years: 1964-1994
- Rank: Brigadier General
- Conflicts: Vietnam War
- Awards: Navy Distinguished Service Medal; Legion of Merit; Distinguished Flying Cross; Bronze Star Medal

Gerald L. Miller (September 9, 1942 - September 18, 2024) was a retired brigadier general in the United States Marine Corps.

== Early life and education ==
Miller was born on September 9, 1942, in Appleton, Wisconsin. He was raised on a dairy farm and graduated from Brillion High School in Brillion, Wisconsin, before graduating from Marquette University and Marquette University Law School. Later, he moved to Combined Locks, Wisconsin. Miller's two brothers and his son also served in the United States Marine Corps.

== Career ==
Miller was commissioned through the NROTC program as an officer in the United States Marine Corps in 1964. The following year, he was deployed to serve as an infantry officer in the Vietnam War.

After returning to the United States and recovering from wounds received in combat, he served as a public affairs officer at the Marine Corps recruiting station in Chicago, Illinois. In 1967, he began flight training in Pensacola, Florida. The following year, he was stationed at Marine Corps Air Station El Toro. He then served a second tour of duty as an RF-4B pilot in the Vietnam War.

After completing law school in 1975, Miller served as a Marine Corps judge advocate at bases and station in the United States and overseas. Before retiring in 1994, and as a brigadier general, he served as Staff Judge Advocate to the Commandant of the Marine Corps and as the Director of the Judge Advocate Division at Headquarters, U.S. Marine Corps.

== Awards and decorations ==
Navy Distinguished Service Medal, Defense Superior Service Medal, Legion of Merit, Distinguished Flying Cross, Bronze Star with Combat "V", Purple Heart, Meritorious Service Medal, Air Medal with numeral 16, Navy Commendation Medal with two gold stars, Navy Achievement Medal, Combat Action Ribbon, Presidential Unit Citation, Meritorious Unit Commendation Ribbon with one bronze star, National Defense Service Medal with one bronze star, Vietnam Service Medal with silver star, Sea Service Deployment Ribbon, Republic of Vietnam Meritorious Unit Citation (Gallantry Cross), Republic of Vietnam Meritorious Unit Citation (Civil Action), and Republic of Vietnam Campaign Medal.
