= Jill Lajdziak =

Jill Lajdziak (pronounced La-Jek) is the president and CEO of Penske Vehicle Services. She is the former General Manager of General Motors' Saturn division. In 2005, she was named one of the 100 Leading Women in the North American Auto Industry, along with 19 other GM colleagues, which made GM the most represented company on the list. Jill has two children. At the beginning of January 2010, Lajdziak was named the President of SmartUSA vehicles. She was appointed to this position by Roger Penske.

== Background ==
Born in Brillion, Wisconsin, Lajdziak earned her BSc in business marketing and management from the University of Wisconsin–Green Bay in 1979. Her experience includes a position with Elf Aquitaine Norge A/S, a Norwegian subsidiary of Elf Aquitaine. Later, she worked at a GM dealership as sales and service representative.

In 1980, Jill Lajdziak formally joined General Motors, gradually advancing through the following positions (year of appointment given):

- 1980 - District Sales Manager, Chevrolet Motor Division
- 1983 - Metro District Sales Manager for Chevrolet
- 1984 - Assistant Manager, General Motors

== Career with Saturn ==
Continuing her advancement within General Motors Corporation, Jill Lajdziak joined the newly founded Saturn Corporation in 1986, playing a part in the development of Saturn's retailer network. Her positions included (year of appointment given):

- 1986 - Manager of Retailer Selection
- 1987 - Manager of Retailer Network Development
- 1989 - Regional Manager of Central United States
- 1995 (March) - Executive Director of Customer/Retail Operations & Strategies Team
- 1997 - Executive Director of Retailer Network Development
- 1999 - Vice President of Sales, Service, and Marketing

In 2004, the position of Saturn was redefined within General Motors, with Saturn losing a seat on GM's board. Jill Lajdziak was appointed General Manager of Saturn, with responsibilities encompassing brand and product development, marketing and supervision of the field organization. This more brand-oriented role of both Lajdziak and Saturn as a GM division put the formerly more independent corporation more in line with other GM North American brands.
