= Isaac N. McComb =

American politician

Isaac N. McComb (December 11, 1850 – January 27, 1938) was an American physician and politician.

Born in Hortonville, Wisconsin, McComb went to the Hortonville Public Schools. He then went to Lawrence University in Appleton, Wisconsin and to the Northwestern University Medical School. McComb practiced medicine in Brillion, Wisconsin. He served on the Brillion Village Board and the school board. McComb also served on the Calumet County, Wisconsin Board of Supervisors. In 1901, McComb served in the Wisconsin State Assembly and was a Democrat. He also served as a jury commissioner and pension examiner. McComb died at his home in Brillion, Wisconsin.
