= Charles Bernard =

Charles Bernard may refer to:

- Charles Bernard (surgeon) (c. 1652–1710), Royal surgeon
- Charles Bernard (cricketer) (1876–1953), English right-hand batsman
- Charles Bernard (figure skater) (20th century), American figure skater
- Charles Bernard (civil servant) (1837–1901), administrator in British Burma
- Charles E. Bernard (1893–1979), American aviator and businessman
- Charles T. Bernard (1927–2015), American politician
- Charles Bernard (bishop) (died 1890), Irish Anglican bishop
- Charles Bernard, a Jujutsu Kaisen character

== See also ==
- Bernard Charlès (born 1957), CEO of Dassault Systèmes
- Charles Barnard (disambiguation)
- Charles de Bernard (1804–1850), French writer
- Charles-Bernard (1740–1813), Count of Vorsselaer, Baron of Lichtaert and of Rielen, Lord of Giessen-Oudkerk
