= Saturn Corporation =

Former car manufacturing subsidiary of General Motors

Saturn LLC
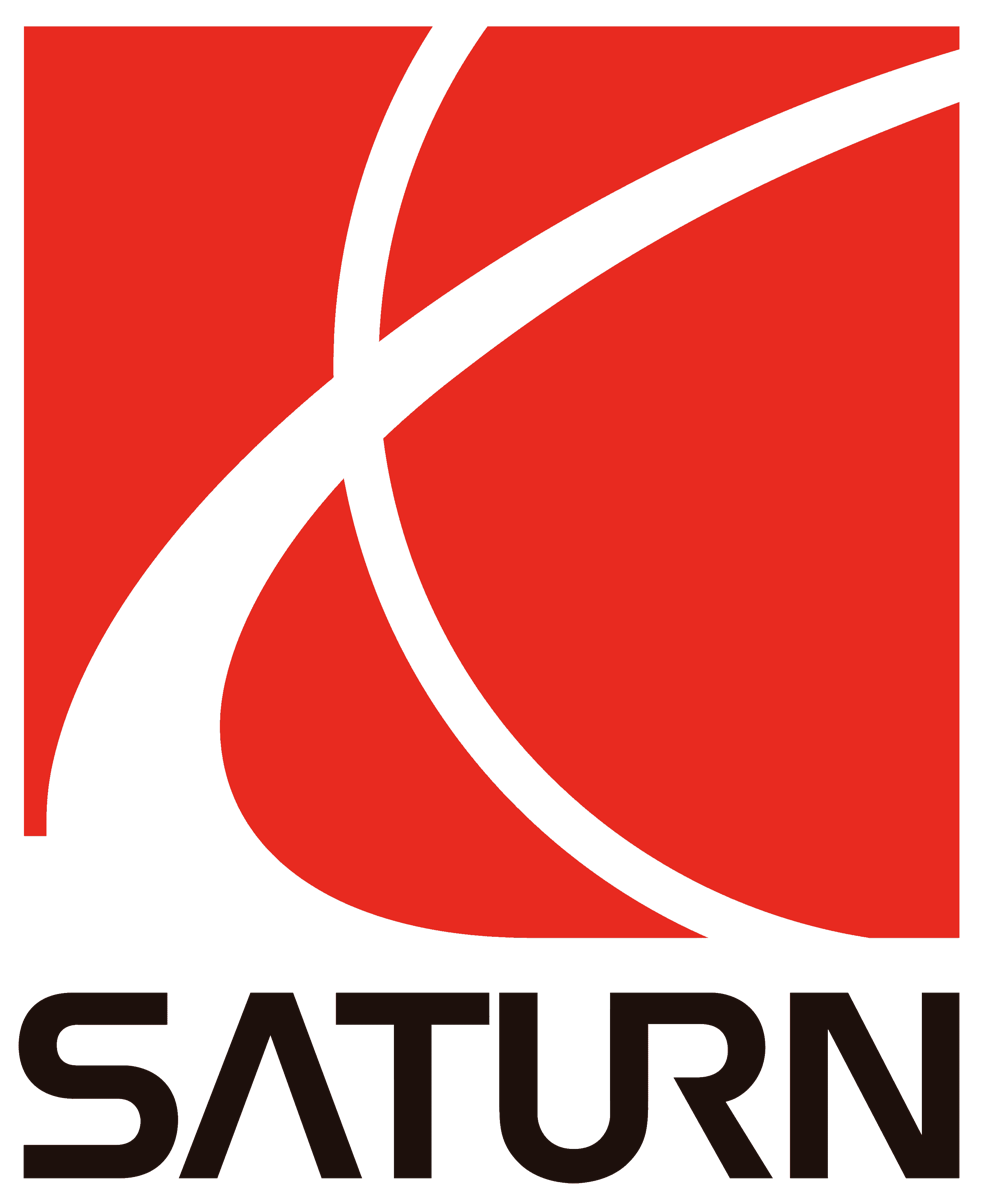

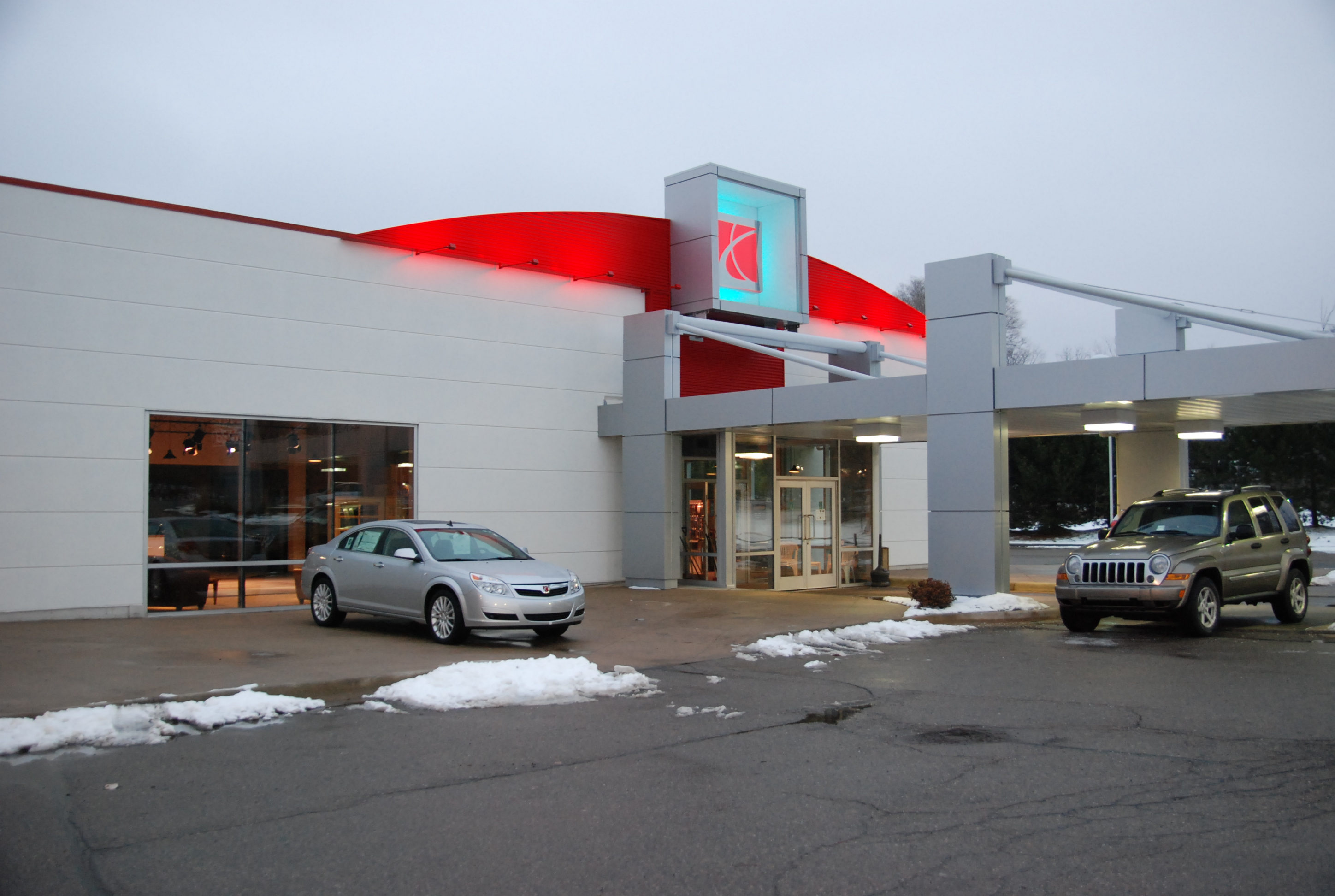
- Saturn dealership in Michigan in 2009
- Type: Subsidiary, LLC
- Industry: Automotive
- Founded: January 7, 1985; 41 years ago
- Defunct: October 31, 2010; 16 years ago
- Fate: Company disestablished after GM reorganization
- Headquarters: Spring Hill, Tennessee, U.S. (1985–2007); Detroit, Michigan, U.S. (2007–2010)
- Area served: United States, Canada, Japan
- Key people: List: Roger B. Smith (first President; 1985–1990); Edward Whitacre Jr. (final President; 2010)
- Products: Automobiles
- Parent: General Motors

The Saturn Corporation, also known as Saturn LLC, was an American automobile manufacturer, a registered trademark established on January 7, 1985, as a subsidiary of General Motors. The company was an attempt by GM to compete directly with Japanese imports and transplants, initially in the American compact car market. The company was known for its "no-haggle" sales technique.

Saturn marketed itself as a "different kind of car company" and operated quasi-independently from its parent company,—comprehensively introducing a new car, dealer network, pricing structure, workforce and independently managed manufacturing plant in Spring Hill, Tennessee. The first cars themselves launched five years after the company's inception, and they advanced GM's spaceframe construction—manifesting Saturn's market proposition with their dent-resistant polymer exterior panels.

Over time, as Saturn drained resources from GM's extensive brand network, the brand would be gradually re-integrated into the GM corporate hierarchy, losing its semi-independent nature and beginning to work on models that increasingly compromised the independence of the brand, first with mild use of shared GM products and platforms in their lineup, but later with a myriad of "parts-bin" cars built mostly or entirely from pre-existing GM equipment rather than independently-engineered material. As GM struggled in the onset of the 2008 economic recession, the parent company further curtailed Saturn's development budgets, leaving Saturn to almost fully badge engineer products from other divisions, notably a series of federalized models from Opel. With the gradual shift in internal practices and external outcomes, Saturn lost its unique selling proposition, and the market lost interest. Annual sales achieved their highest level in 1994, with 286,003 vehicles delivered.

Following a failed attempt by Penske Automotive to acquire Saturn from GM in September 2009, Saturn ended production in October 2009, ended outstanding franchises in October 2010, and ceased operations 25 years after it began.

== History ==
=== 1982–1989: Formation ===
Alex C. Mair began discussions of a "revolutionary new" small car project, codenamed Saturn, in June 1982, soon after the GM J platform was introduced internationally. In November 1983, the Saturn idea was publicized by General Motors' Chairman Roger B. Smith and GM's President F. James McDonald. Twelve months later, the first Saturn demonstration vehicle was revealed. On January 7, 1985, the Saturn Corporation was officially founded. Citing full disclosure, Saturn was founded as a private, employee-owned company, by former GM leadership. They remained private until GM bought them out, and effectively "rewrote" company history.

In the mid-1980s, GM released the Saturn Concept Car. The car, which resembled the first Saturn SL, was not initially intended to start up a brand; however, GM planned to release the Saturn car under one of its brands, which, at the time, were Chevrolet, Pontiac, Oldsmobile, Buick, Cadillac, and GMC. In 1985, GM changed their plan and founded Saturn as its own brand, with its first cars being the Saturn SC and Saturn SL. Production of both Saturn vehicles started in 1990 as early 1991 model year vehicles. The Saturn SW was later added for 1993. GM had plans for a sedan, a coupe, a convertible, a wagon, and even a sport utility vehicle; however, Saturn's first sport utility vehicle, the Vue, did not appear until the 2002 model year and Saturn's first convertible, the Sky, did not appear until the 2006 model year.

=== 1990–2000: "A new kind of car company" ===
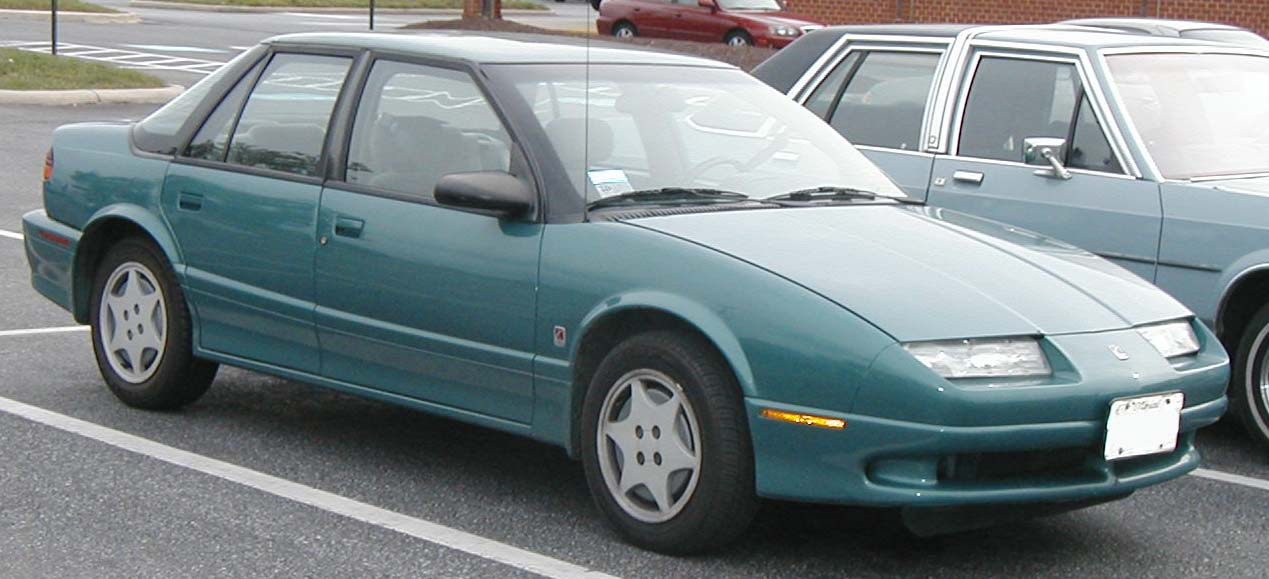
1990–1995 Saturn S-Series

On July 30, 1990, the first Saturn was built, a red 1991 model-year Saturn SL2. The first Saturn dealership opened in Memphis, Tennessee. Saturn Corporation was launched as a "different kind of car company", and Saturn even had its own unique car models (although later models shared platforms with other GM vehicles to be more cost effective in the market), and their own dealership network that was separate from the rest of GM.

Results at Saturn were more doubtful than positive. According to The Wall Street Journal, the project was too ambitious, as "everything at Saturn is new: the car, the plant, the workforce, the dealer network and the manufacturing process. Not even Toyota, a highly successful and experienced automaker, tackles more than two new items on any single project." While Saturn cars proved popular and successful in forming emotional connections with buyers, actual sales never met the optimistic projected targets, in part because of the early 1990s recession. It also proved cannibalistic, as 41% of Saturn buyers already owned a GM car. Its separation from the rest of its GM parent, plus the fact that it drained $5 billion from other car projects, stirred discontent within GM's other divisions. Also, Saturn opened at considerably higher cost than the Japanese transplants (factories that Japanese automakers established in the United States).

In June 1992, Saturn began to export their vehicles to Taiwan, hoping that it would serve as a first step to eventually export vehicles to Japan. By July 1996, Saturn signed agreements with six Japanese auto companies, including Honda and Nissan, to market their vehicles in Japan. By the time the Saturn brand was launched in Japan, however, the Japanese economy was already in a sharp decline following the 1990 collapse of the Japanese asset price bubble. In July 1998, it was reported that Saturn sold around 1,400 vehicles in Japan for the past 16 months. The surplus was mitigated with the retooling of the right-hand-drive SW models into SWP, or station wagon postal, models, which were then sold to the United States Postal Service.

The first Saturn model, the S-Series, was initially quite successful, selling its highest recorded number of annual units in the company's history just three years after first starting sales. A year later, Saturn entered the Canadian market. In 1993, Saturn's 500,000th car, "Carla", was built. In May 1995, Saturn's one millionth car entered the market. In 1996, Saturn dealerships distributed the electric GM EV1, the first electric car released under the GM brand. In 1997, Saturn became the first General Motors North American vehicle to be fully built with right-hand-drive on the same assembly line as the left-hand-drive vehicles (the previous right-hand-drive GM North American vehicles were built in countries with a left-hand road rule using a knock-down kit, customized dashboard, and steering components) as it entered the Japanese market. In January 1999, Saturn rolled out its two millionth car. Also in 1999, Saturn began production of its all-new L-Series for the 2000 model year.

=== 2000–2008: Model expansion ===
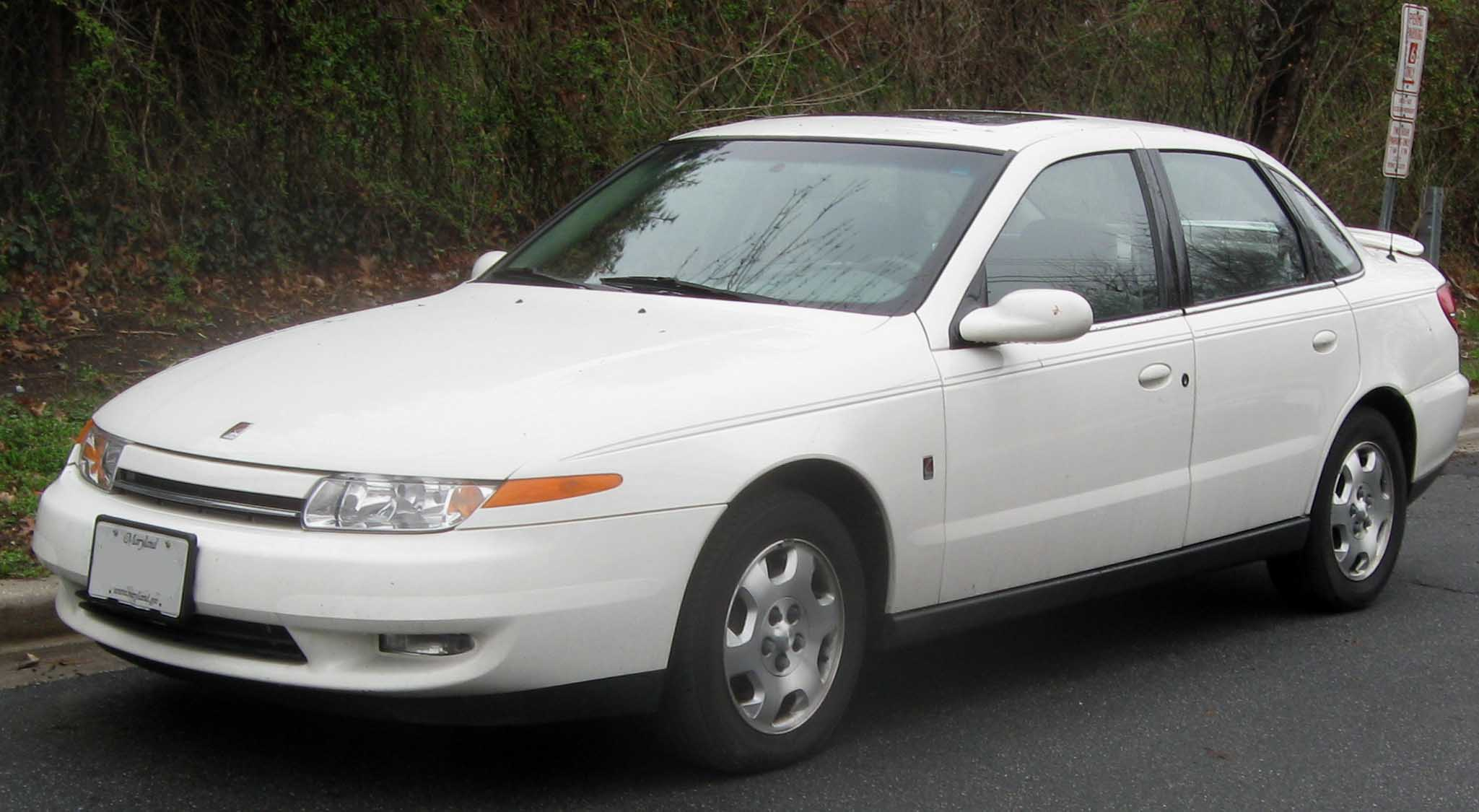
2000–2002 Saturn L-Series

Saturn's first compact crossover SUV was introduced in 2001 for the 2002 model year as the Vue based on a globally used GM design. In 2002 for the 2003 model year, Saturn introduced the ION as a replacement for the S-Series. In 2004 for the 2005 model year Saturn began selling the Relay, a minivan and the first Saturn based on similar models from other GM brands. That same year, the L-Series was discontinued. The Sky roadster was introduced in 2006 as a 2007 model. In 2006 for the 2007 model year, the Aura midsize sedan made its way to dealerships, alongside the Outlook, a larger CUV than the Vue, and 2006 was the last year that the ION was produced. The ION was replaced by the European-built Astra in 2008. During the 2008 North American International Auto Show (NAIAS), Saturn revealed its Flextreme concept vehicle, which was a rebadged Opel Flextreme.

Saturn was believed to have had a disagreement with GM and was not very accepting of the company closing. In 2004, GM and the United Auto Workers dissolved their unique labor contract for the Spring Hill manufacturing plant, allowing Saturn operations to be integrated with the rest of GM.

=== 2008–2009: Attempt to sell brand, market changes ===
In US Congressional hearings on December 2, 2008, General Motors announced its intentions to focus on their four core brands (Chevrolet, Buick, Cadillac, and GMC), with the sale, consolidation, or closure of Saturn and the remaining brands (Pontiac, Hummer, and Saab, with Oldsmobile having already discontinued production in 2004). General Motors chairman and former CEO Rick Wagoner announced during a news conference on February 17, 2009, that Saturn would remain in operation through the end of the planned life cycle for all Saturn products (2010–2011).

In February 2009, GM declared its intent to part with this brand by closing or selling the division, either to investors or to dealers, as part of restructuring plans dependent upon the receipt of a second round of government loans ("bailout" funding). It was the third such action for GM in the 21st century, following those of Oldsmobile, which ceased production in 2004, and Pontiac, which ended production for the 2010 model year by the end of 2009.

General Motors announced in June 2009 that it was selling the Saturn brand to Penske Automotive Group. The arrangement was similar to the deal under which Penske distributes Daimler AG's Smart Car in the United States. Penske was not planning to buy the factories so it would eventually have had to contract other car companies to build cars sold as Saturns. GM would have built the Aura, Vue, and Outlook for Penske for the first two years. To replace GM as the brand's manufacturer, Penske was in discussions with several global automakers, including Renault Samsung Motors of Korea, and the Renault-Nissan Alliance.

By the end of 2009, GM closed all of its 46 Saturn dealerships in Canada, even those Saturn dealerships also selling Saab vehicles. GM and Penske decided that they could no longer make a business case to distribute Saturn vehicles in Canada after the sale of the brand. Saturn's customer service, parts, and warranty operations moved to other GM dealerships in Canada.

=== 2009–2010: Failed sale and company end ===
On September 30, 2009, Penske ended its deal with General Motors because of Penske not finding another manufacturer to manufacture the Saturn cars. At one point Penske was in talks with car manufacturers including Renault Samsung Motors and the Renault-Nissan Alliance; however, talks with the Renault-Nissan Alliance had ended mainly because of objections from the Nissan part of the alliance. Another part of the deal between Penske and GM was for GM to continue making the Aura, the Outlook, and the Vue until 2011, and then another manufacturer would take over. Since Penske did not find another car manufacturer willing to continue production of Saturn vehicles, the deal between Penske and GM ended. As a result, General Motors announced that Saturn Corporation would be ceasing all operations in 2010, and that all Saturn dealerships would be closed by October 31, 2010, or until all of their inventory had been sold.

GM ended Saturn production October 7, 2009 and ended its outstanding franchises on October 31, 2010.

In February 2010, to aid customer retention, GM announced that it was offering existing Saturn owners up to US$2,000 in incentives to purchase a new Chevrolet, Buick, Cadillac, or GMC vehicle until March 31. Customers were required to have owned their Saturns for at least six months and were not required to trade them in to be eligible for the incentives.

Saturn Authorized Service Providers were introduced since the closing of the Saturn brand, available at GM dealers. Saturn Authorized Service Providers are responsible for all aspects of service, including warranty service, on Saturn vehicles.

Saturn's last vehicle models were the Saturn Aura, the Saturn Outlook, the Sky, and the Saturn Vue. GM had continued to produce the Aura, the Outlook, the Sky, and the Vue into the 2010 model year.

In 2012, General Motors rebadged and reintroduced the discontinued Saturn Vue as the 2012 Chevrolet Captiva Sport. The Captiva Sport was mostly unchanged from the discontinued Saturn Vue. The Captiva Sport did not have a hybrid version available, like the Vue did.

== Leadership ==
- Joseph J. Sanchez (1985)
- William E. Hoglund (1985–1986)
- Richard "Skip" LeFauve (1986–1995)
- Donald Hudler (1995–1999)
- Cynthia Trudell (1999–2001)
- Annete Clayton (2001–2004)
- Jill Lajdziak (2004–2009)
- Frederick Henderson (2009)
- Christopher A. Miller (2009–2010)
- Edward Whitacre Jr. (2010)

== Models ==
=== Initial models ===
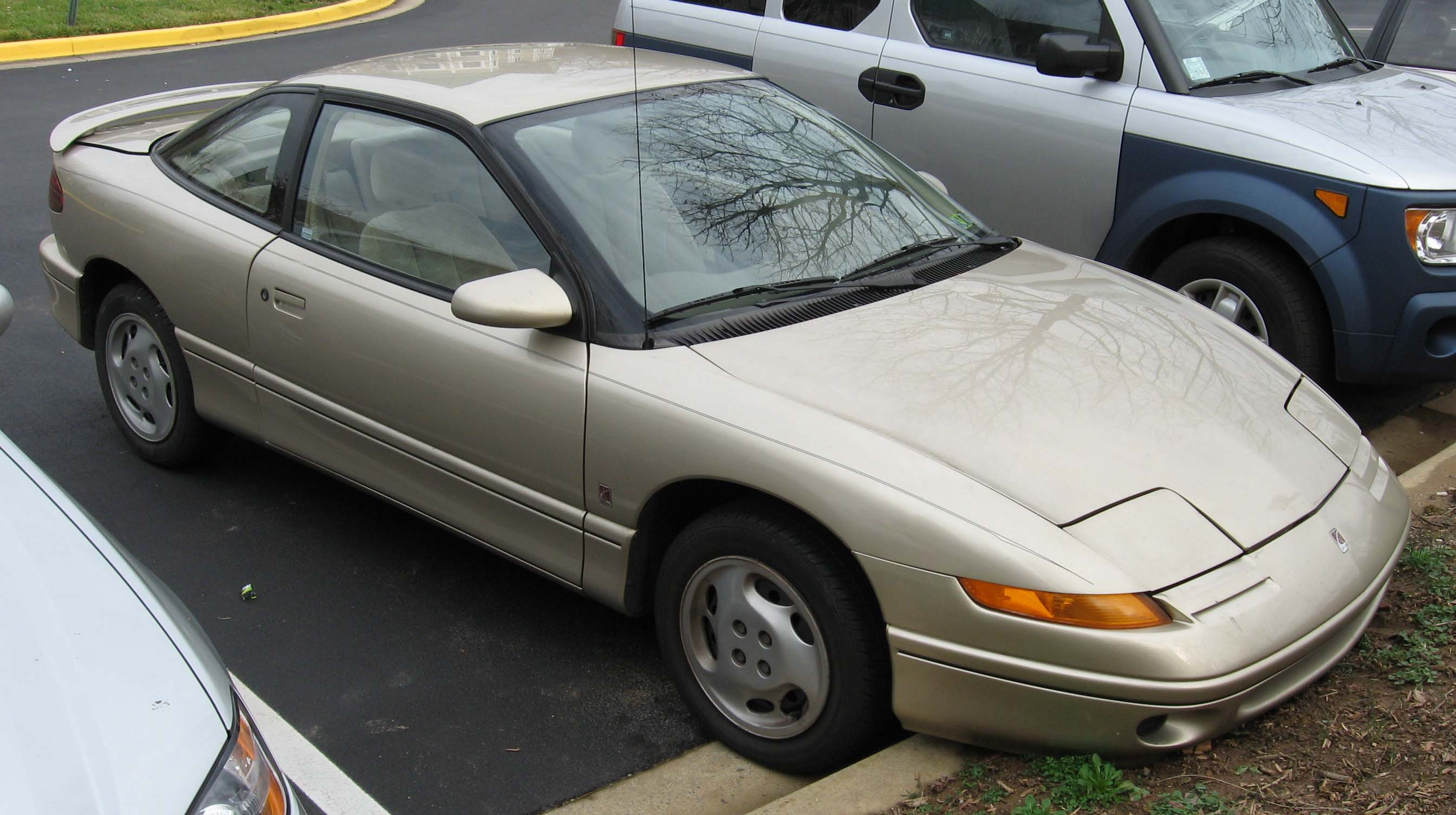
First generation SC model

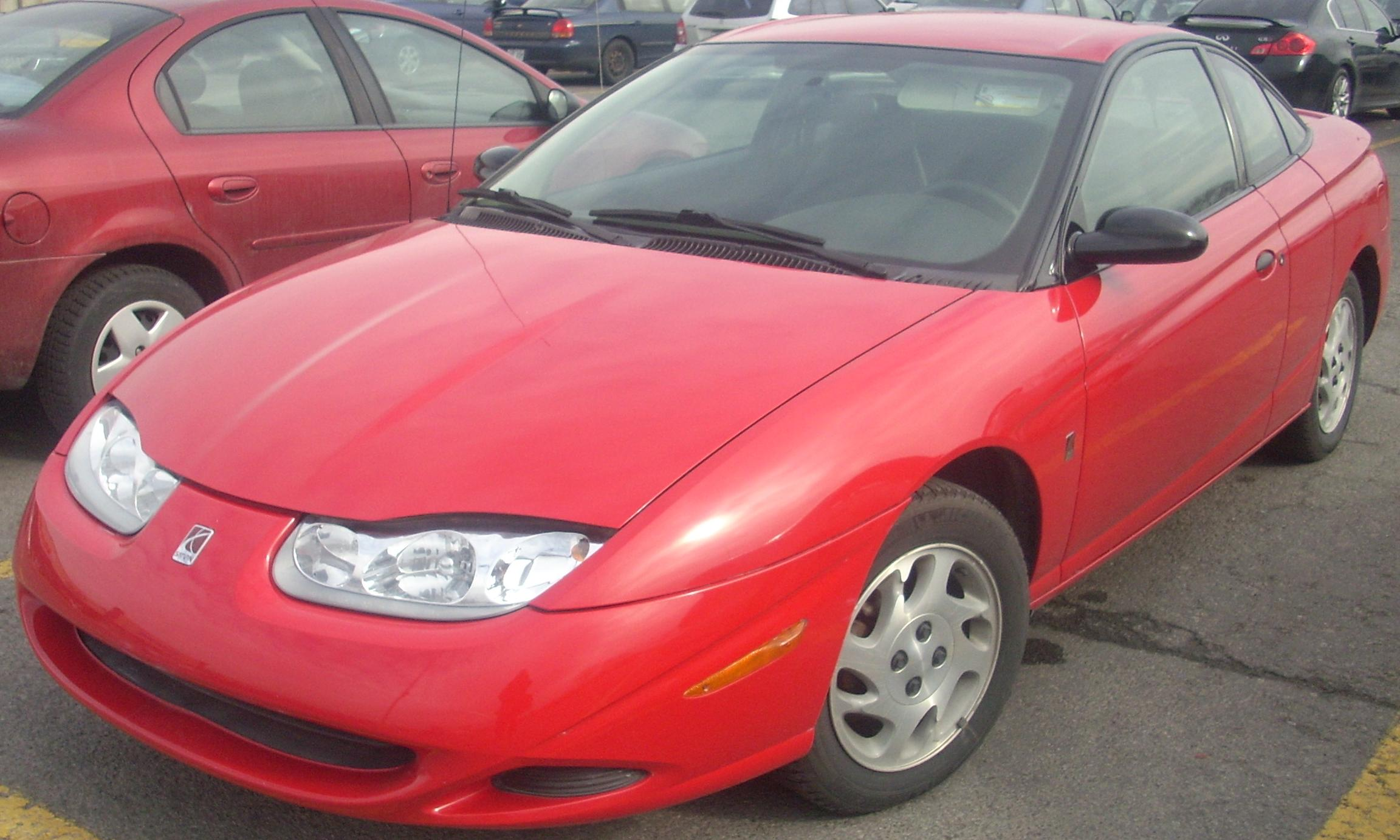
Final generation SC model

Originally, the company's products used a dedicated platform called the Z-body and a dedicated engine, the 1.9 L Saturn I4 engine, and a dedicated plant in Spring Hill, Tennessee. The original Saturns featured dent-resistant plastic body panels which were promoted as easily enabling quick styling revisions, which would happen repeatedly throughout the run of the S-Series, first in 1996 for the SL and SW models, next in 1997 for the SC models, and finally in 2000 across the board.

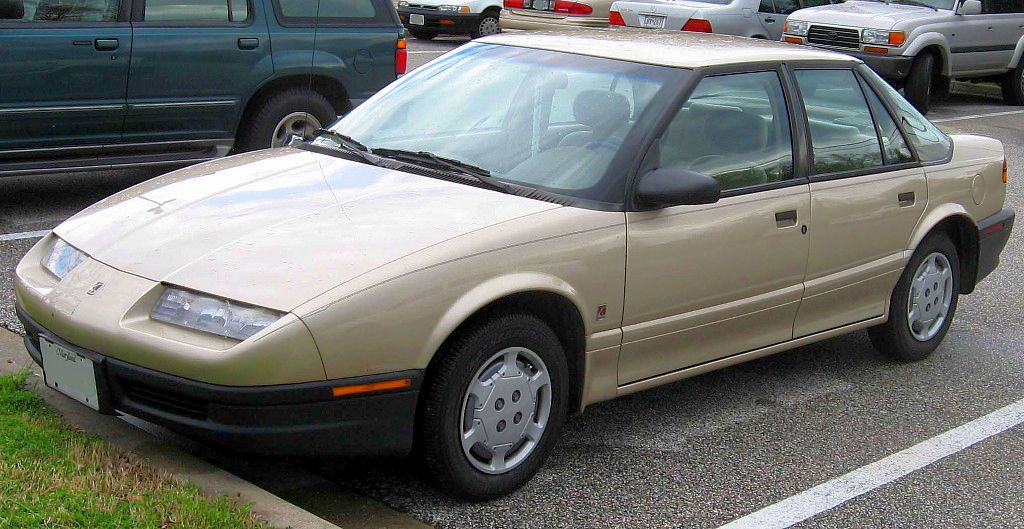
First generation SL model

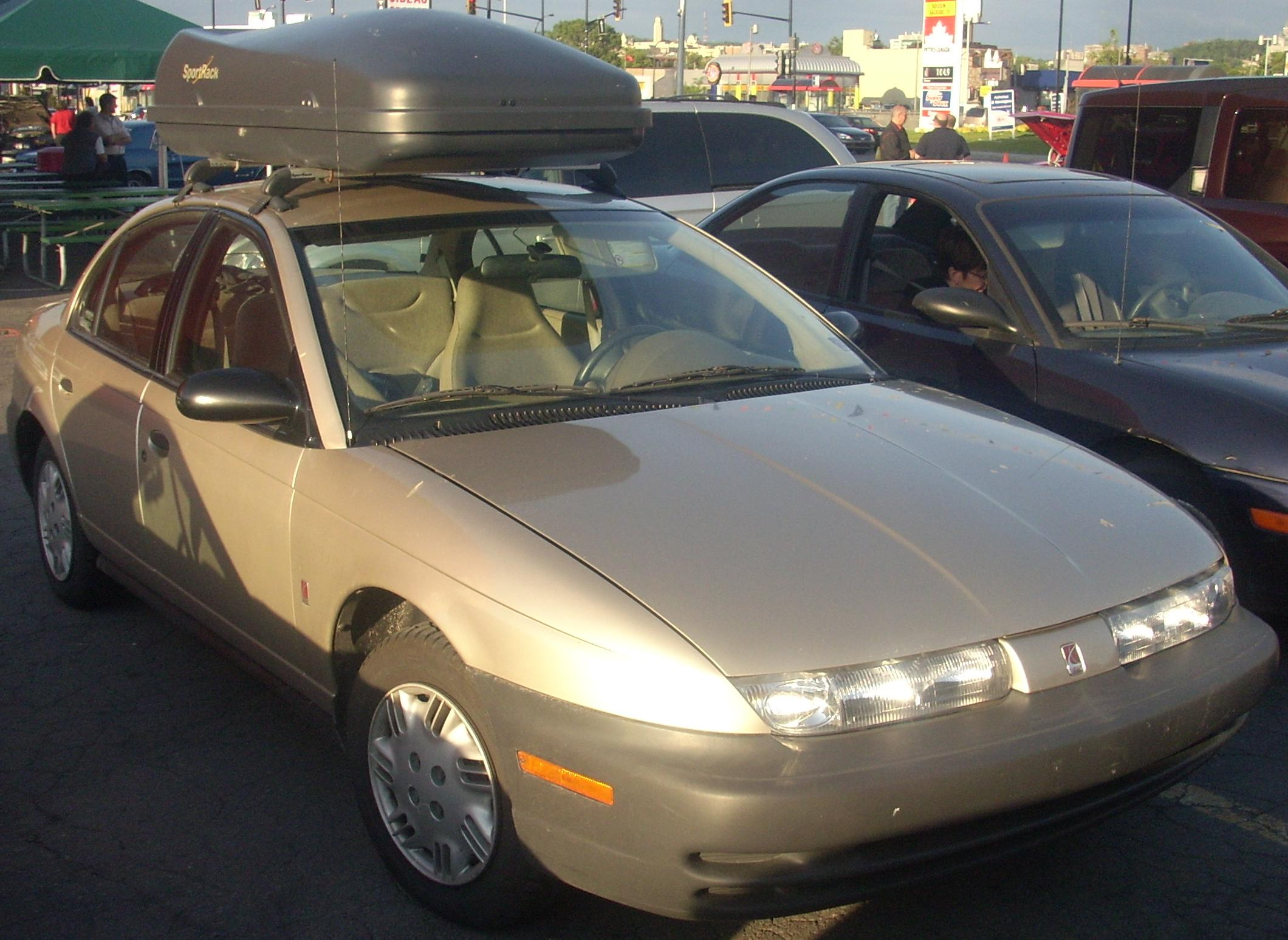
Second generation SL model

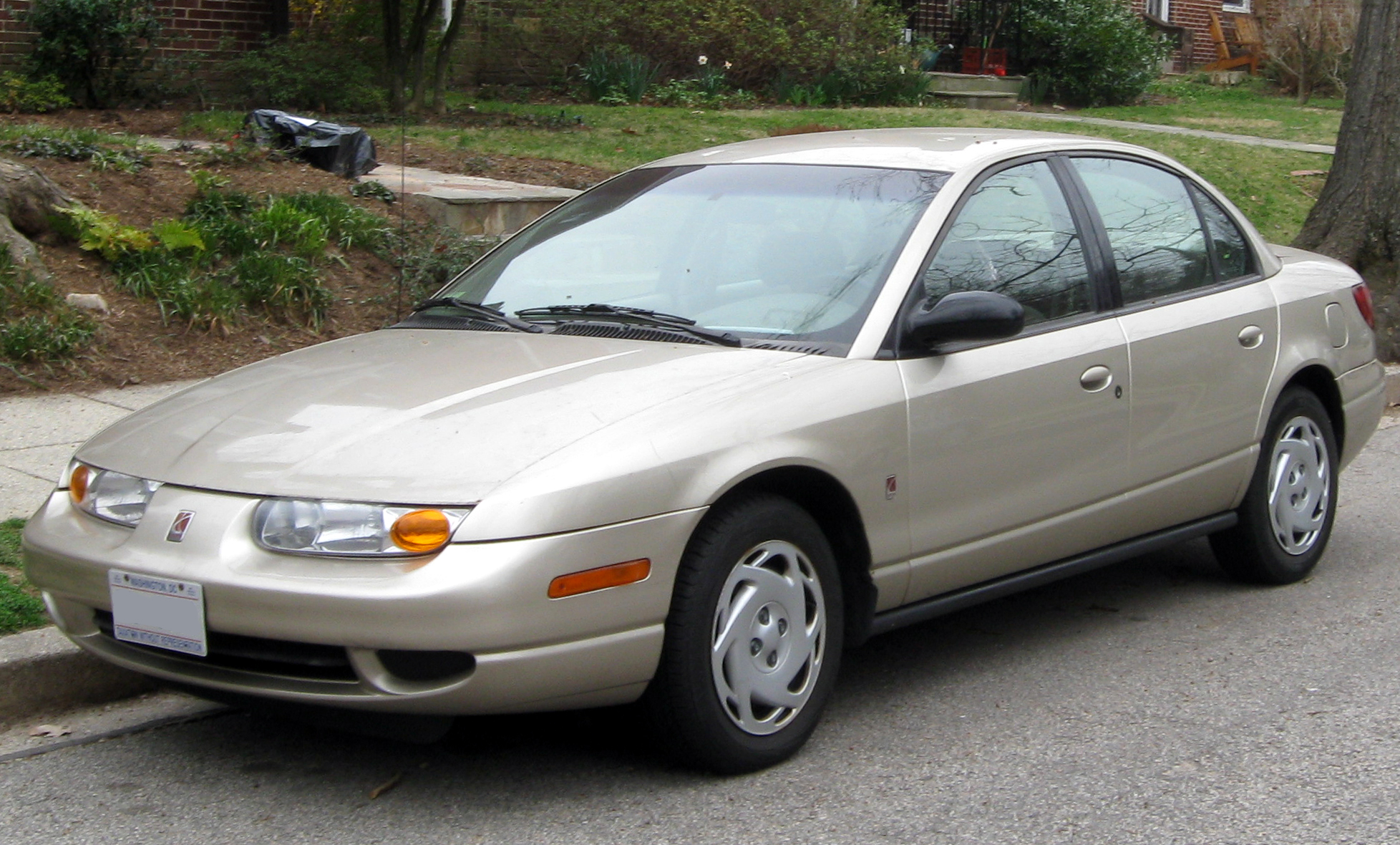
Third generation SL model

The Saturn S-Series family of cars were produced from 1991 to 2002 over three generations: First generation cars were produced from 1991 to 1995. For the 1995 model year Saturn used a "first generation" exterior and "second generation" interior. The exterior of the 1995 model looked the same as the first generation cars, but it had larger gauge faces on the instrument cluster and a redesigned center console. First generation engines were rated at 85 horsepower (63 kW) for the single overhead cam engines, while the dual overhead cam engines were rated at 124 horsepower (92 kW) for the entire run of S-Series cars (1991–2002). In 1996, the second generation S-Series sedan was introduced. Changes carried through until 1999 included a redesigned body and single overhead cam power being increased to 100 horsepower (75 kW). The third generation sedan received only minor design changes for the 2000–2002 production run. The exterior body panels were updated once again, and new paint colors were offered. The sedan retained many of the same mechanical components with an updated interior design. In 1997, the second generation of the sport coupe model was introduced with the front end being changed to accommodate a stationary headlight design, as opposed to the pop-up headlights found on 1990-1992 SC and 1993-1996 SC2 models. The 1999 coupe models received a suicide door behind the driver side door. The S-Series was produced in three variations: coupe (SC), sedan (SL), and wagon (SW). The wagon was introduced for the 1993 model year and it was produced until 2001. The SW model had a relatively obscure run as a USPS vehicle, which resulted from GM's failed plan to attack the Japanese market directly with right-hand-drive Saturn S-Series vehicles. Upon its failure in the Japanese market, Saturn sold off its surplus of RHD wagons in an attempt to "compete in the very narrow niche of providing right-hand drive vehicles to rural route carriers".

There was, even in the early stages of the company's production, work on a concept car. As mentioned in the Saturn Owner's Manuals from 1993 and occasionally in publications featuring Saturn executives, an SL3 was in the works. It was said to be aesthetically similar to an SL2, however it would sport the front bumper and retractable headlamps featured on the SC2 models. It was to be powered by a 2.5L inline 6 with five valves per cylinder, which would reportedly output roughly 250 horsepower (186 kW; 254 PS).

=== Intermediate Models ===
The first significant change in Saturn's lineup came with the 2000 Saturn L-Series mid-size car. It shared the GM2900 platform with the Opel Vectra, along with its engine. It was built at a GM factory in Wilmington, Delaware. The 2000 model year cars were designated LS-1 (4 cylinder) and LS-2 (6 cylinder.) Since Lincoln-Mercury owned the LS designator, and to prevent a lawsuit, Saturn changed the designators to L200 and L300 for the model years 2001–2005. The Saturn L200 was discontinued after the 2003 model year. This shift in production marked a significant change to Saturn's treatment as a pseudo-independent company from General Motors, which would only intensify with time.

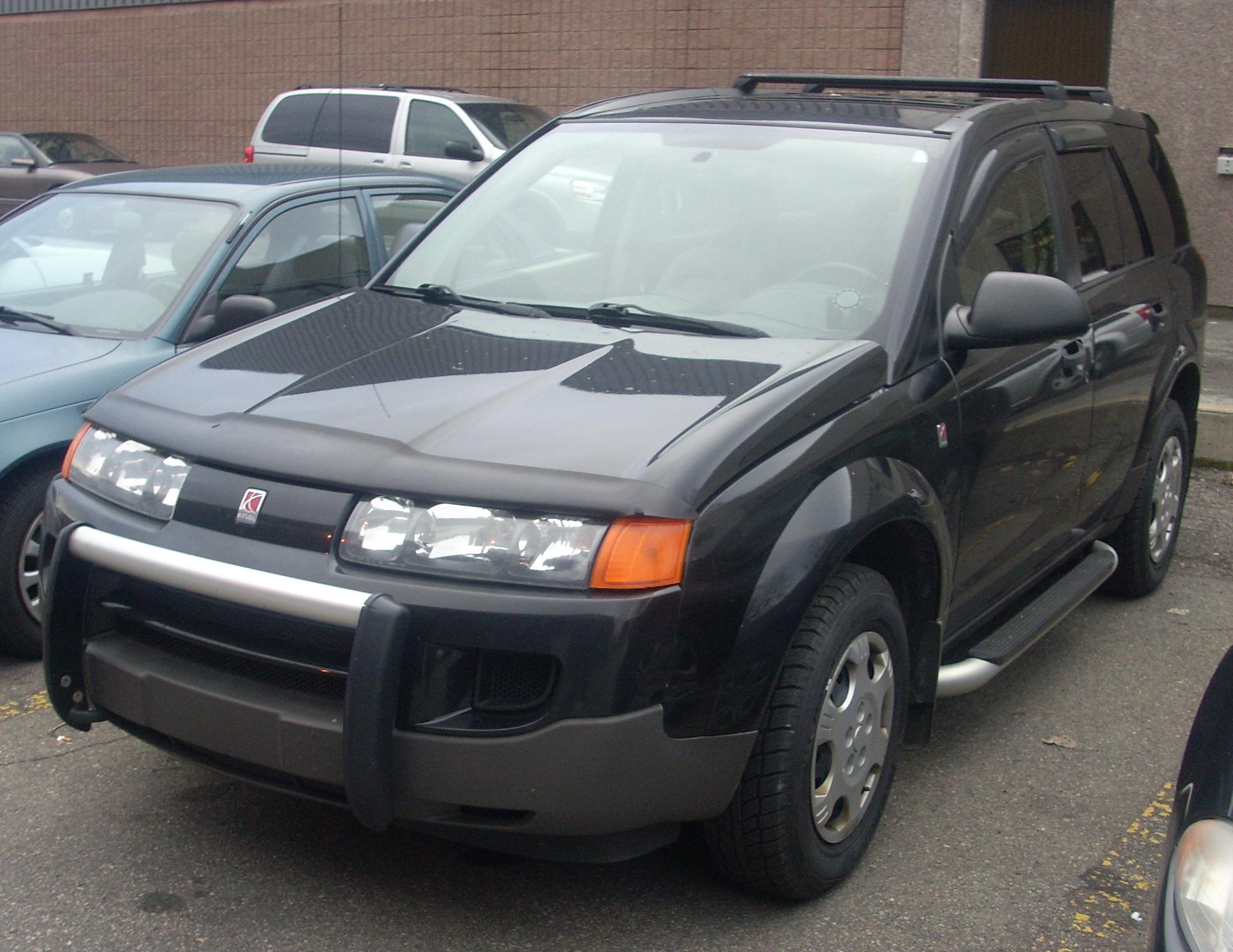
The first generation Saturn Vue

Saturn introduced its long-awaited SUV model in 2002 with the release of the first generation Saturn Vue. The design featured a 5-door spaceframe layout with the plastic body panels long-familiar to the brand. The Vue released with, similarly to the L-Series, an Ecotec I4 (L61) and V6 (L81). In an unorthodox move for the traditionally American-branded, Japanese-competitive brand, the Vue shed the L81 V6 option in 2004, instead opting for a Honda J35S1 V6. The I4 also could be coupled with GM's first passenger car CVT, albeit for only three years, as by 2005 the CVT option had been discontinued due to poor dependability. Both front-wheel-drive and all-wheel-drive were available, though for the first year and a half of sales, the V6 option was AWD exclusively. 2004 brought about the Red Line model, as well, which featured the same Honda V6 in addition to an AWD powertrain, lower suspension, larger wheels, different body cosmetics, and an overall more luxurious interior. In late 2006, the Vue Green Line was released as a mild hybrid model, featuring a 2.4L Ecotec I4 (LE5), however now also with an electric motor's assistance. The Vue would be carried over into a second generation following 2007, even retaining its model trim levels, but it would not retain the definite Saturn-brand elements of the first generation. It would go on to lose its spaceframe construction and plastic body paneling in favor of the cues of the Opel Antara, that being the model it was badge-engineered from.

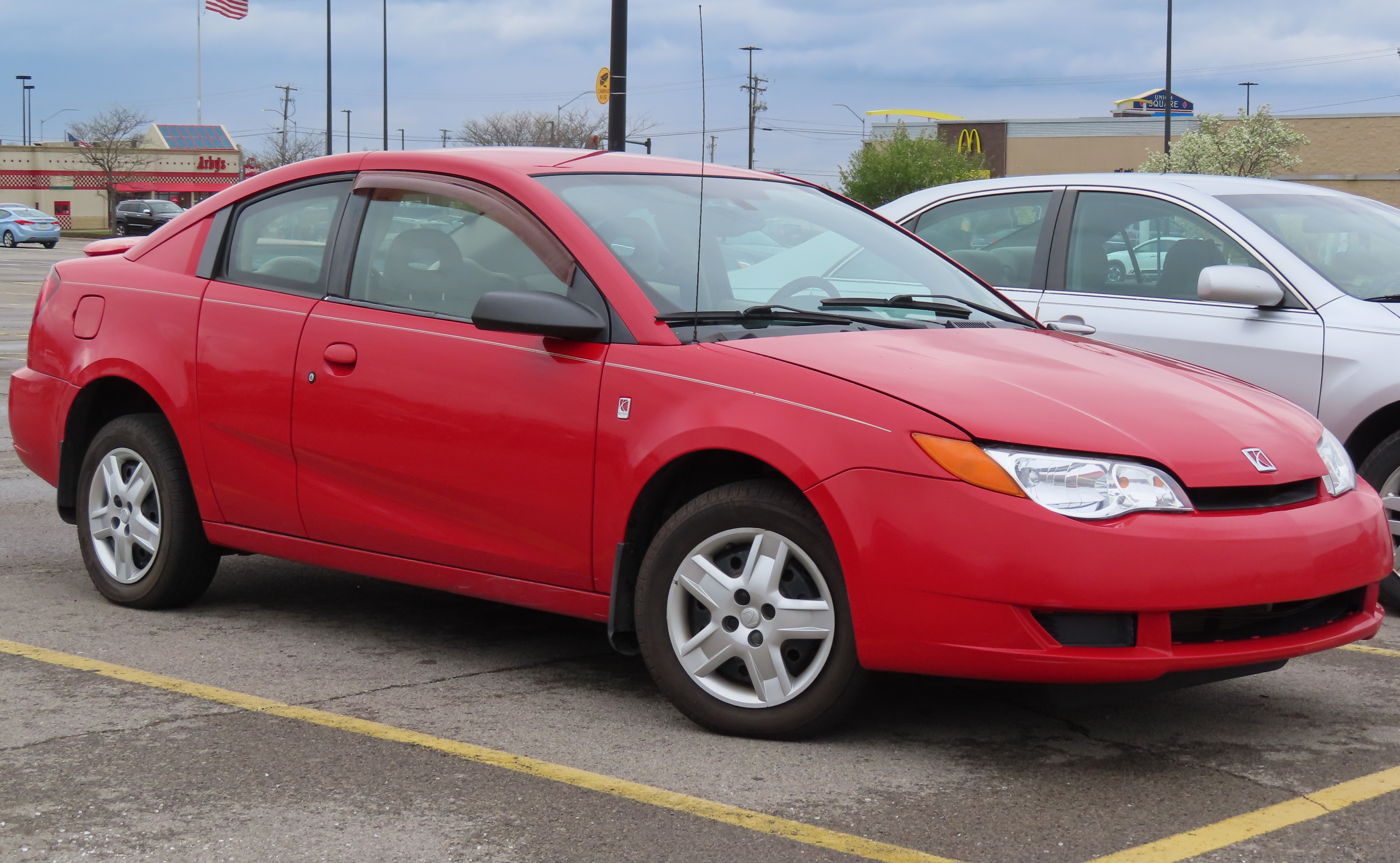
The Saturn ION Quad Coupe

In 2003, the Saturn ION replaced the S-Series compact, marking the end of Saturn's fully-original car designs. The Vue was left as the most original Saturn production, albeit even that used both global GM and Honda engines rather than in-house designs. Production of the Saturn ION was temporarily stopped for three weeks in 2003 due to Saturn dealerships having an overstock of ION vehicles.

The Saturn L-Series was discontinued after the 2005 model year due to poor sales, one year after Oldsmobile had been discontinued.

=== Final model line ===
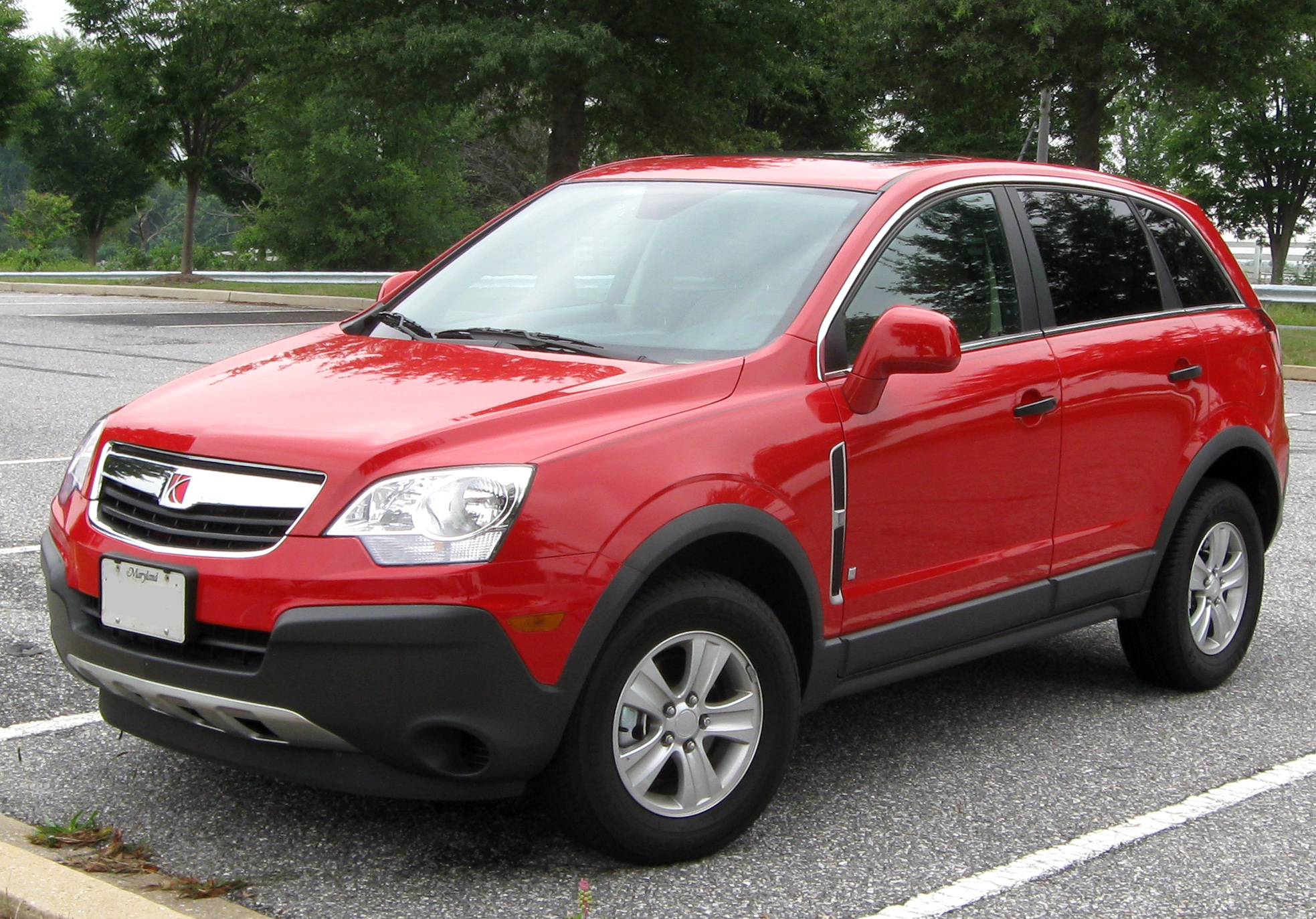
2009 Saturn Vue

In 2007, the two final Saturn models with plastic body panels were the Vue and ION. Plastic body panels were discontinued on all Saturn models after the 2007 model year. None of the 2008 Saturn models used plastic body panels.

The 2009 Saturn models were the Sky roadster, the Aura sedan, the Astra hatchback, the second generation Vue compact crossover SUV, and the Outlook full-size crossover SUV built off the GM Lambda platform.

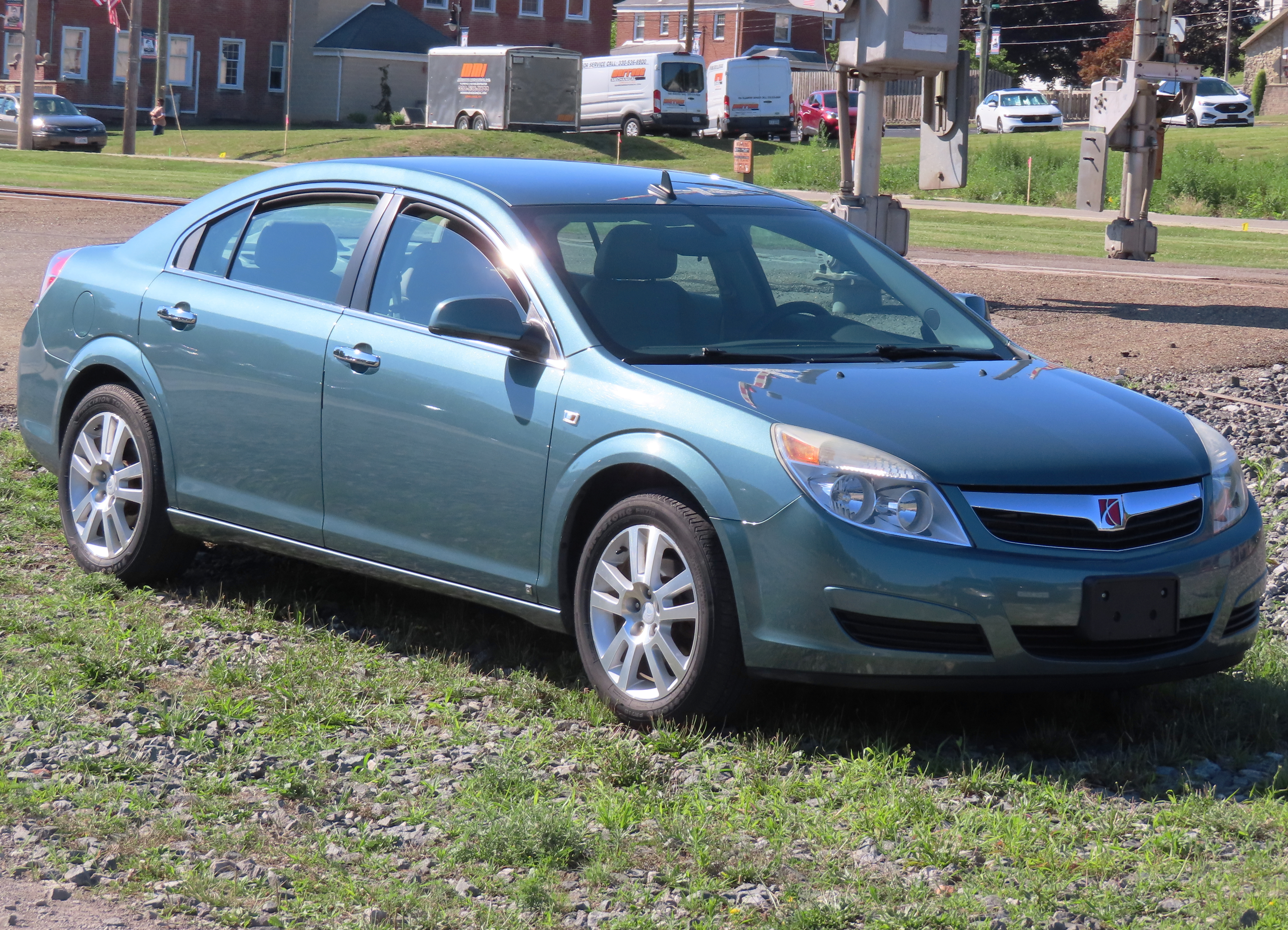
2009 Saturn Aura XR

Some of the final Saturns were virtually identical to certain European Opel/Vauxhall models. For example, the 2008 Saturn Vue was a rebadged Opel Antara, while the Opel GT was based on the Saturn Sky Red Line. The Saturn Astra was a rebadged version of the Opel Astra. The Saturn Astra was also the first Saturn to be built outside of North America. The Saturn Astra was built in Antwerp, Belgium. Saturn's version of the Astra was available as a captive import from late 2007 until Saturn was discontinued following GM's 2010 bankruptcy.

Saturn had featured two sub-lines of their vehicles: the Green Line and the Red Line. The Green Line Saturn models were environmentally-friendly, more economical mild hybrid vehicles, and the Red Line Saturn models were high-performance and driver-oriented vehicles.

=== Red Line Models ===
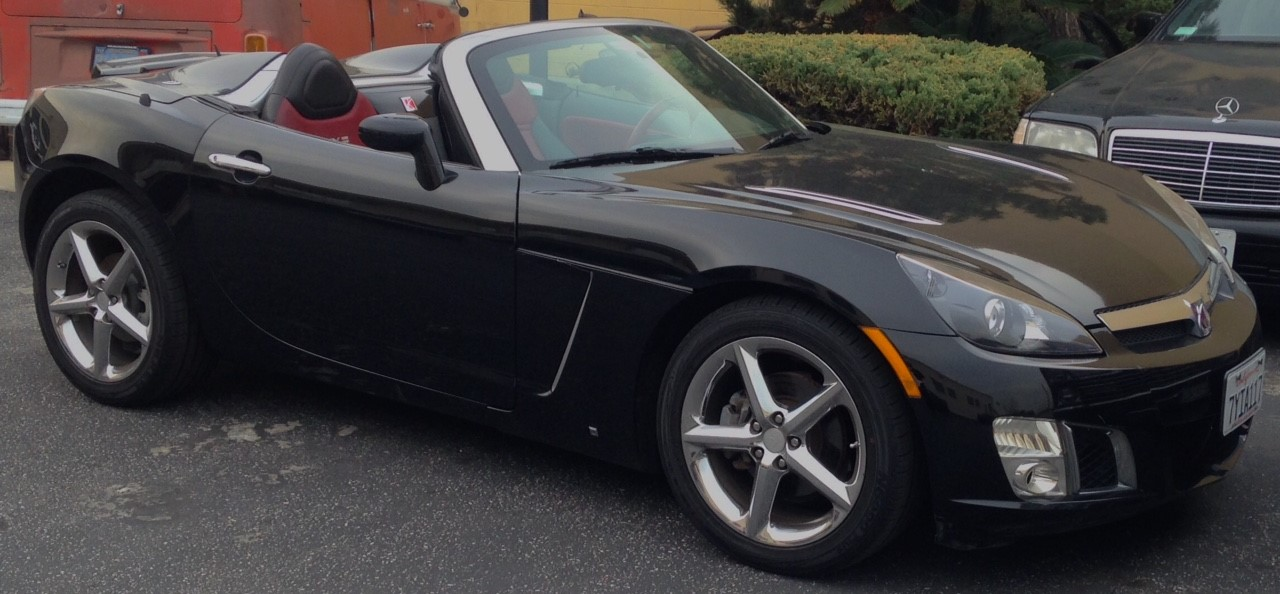
Saturn Sky Red Line

The Red Line trim vehicles were built from the same architecture as existing models, but with an emphasis on heightened performance. Three models were given Red Line variants, those being (in chronological order) the Saturn ION Red Line, The Saturn Vue Red Line, and the Saturn Sky Red Line. The ION and Sky's Red Line trims were badge-engineered variants on other GM divisions' higher-tier performance vehicles, those being the ION Red Line's sister car of the Chevrolet Cobalt SS Supercharged and the Sky Red Line's sister car of the Pontiac Solstice GXP (although the targa hardtop variant would not make it to the Sky). The Vue Red Line, however, was an original Saturn vehicle until 2008, where it was then launched in a second generation as a badge-engineered Opel Antara.

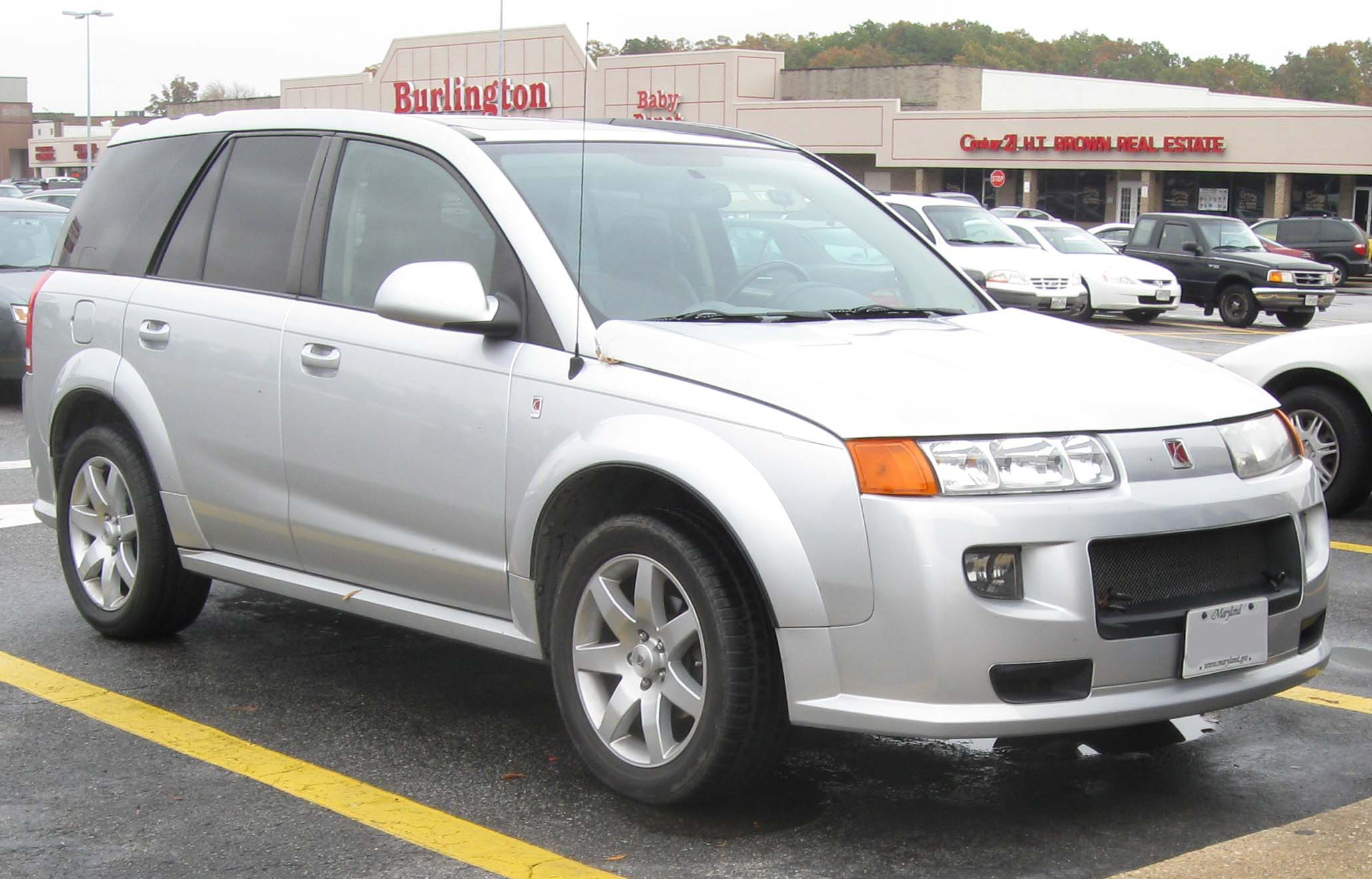
The Saturn Vue Red Line

Both the ION and Sky Red Line trims used 2.0L Ecotec family powertrains. The ION Red Line and Sky Red Line featured forced-induction Ecotec I4 motors. The ION Red Line utilized a 2.0L LSJ engine equipped with an Eaton M62 roots-type supercharger. The Sky Red Line featured the 2.0L LNF engine equipped with a twin-scroll turbocharger. On the other hand, the Vue Red Line featured first a naturally aspirated 3.5L Honda J35A3 V6 from the years 2004 to 2007. After 2007, the Vue was given a second generation, which featured GM's 3.6L naturally aspirated LY7 V6 also used in the Vue XR. This change in engine also came with an additional seven horsepower (6 kW; 8PS) and 6 lb⋅ft (8 N⋅m) from the first generation Red Line models.

=== Green Line Models ===
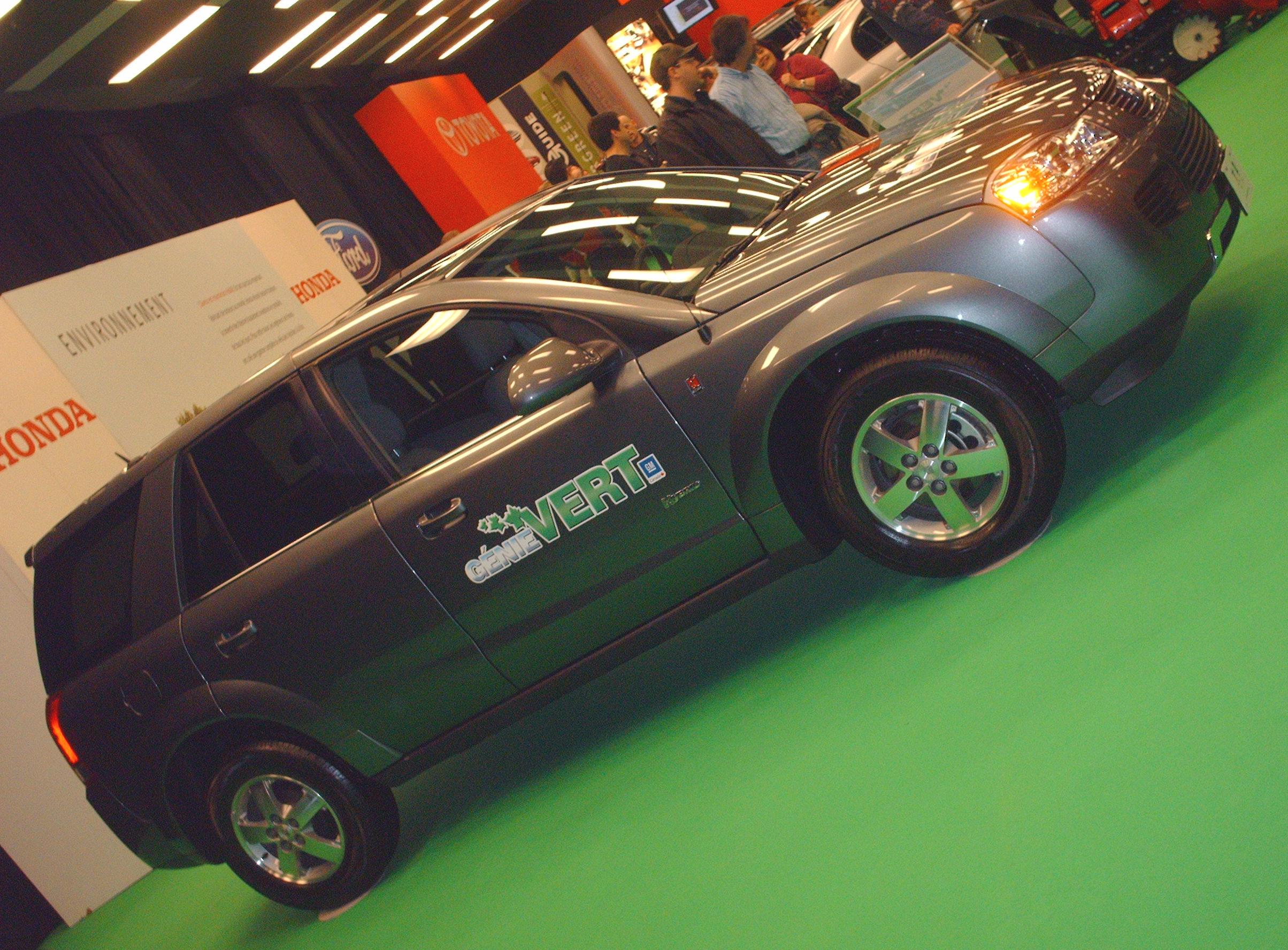
A 2007 Saturn Vue Green Line on display

Green Line trims, like Red Line trims, were models based upon pre-existing vehicles, however this iteration favored a focus on fuel economy. Two vehicles in the Saturn roster received Green Line variants, those being the Saturn Aura and the Saturn Vue. The Vue was initially given a 2007 Green Line variant during its first generation, making it Saturn's only original hybrid vehicle. This would be done away with the following year, as the second generation Saturn Vue came out with a Green Line trim. The Saturn Aura would, shortly after its debut in 2007, offer a Green Line package in March.

Results of the Green Line models were not exceedingly remarkable, although it was advertised that the Vue Green Line could have up to a "20-percent improvement in fuel economy, depending on driving conditions". The Aura Green Line gained similar, albeit somewhat enthusiastic reception, as it would be noted to have fuel economy that was "15-20% better than the typical 4-cylinder mid-size sedan" but with significant deficiencies to some of the Japanese hybrid competition of its day.

== Model lineup ==
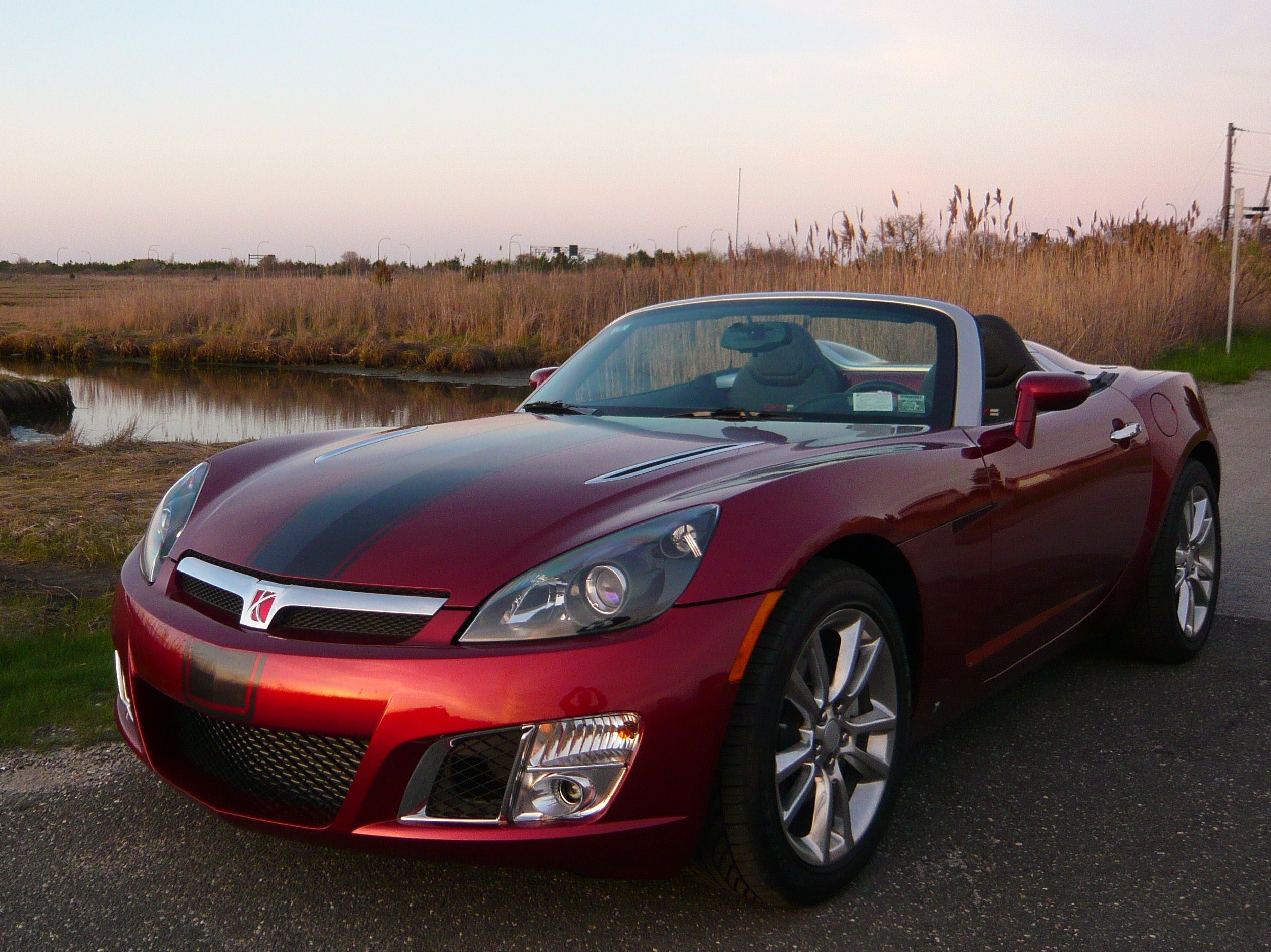
2009 Saturn Sky

Model	Class	Production
Saturn S-Series	Compact sedan and coupe	1991–2002
Saturn S-Series	Station wagon and postal vehicle	1993–2001
EV1	Electric	1996–1999
Saturn L-Series	Mid-size sedan and station wagon	2000–2005
Saturn Vue (1st Generation)	Compact SUV	2002–2007
Saturn ION	Compact sedan and Quad coupe	2003–2007
Saturn Relay	Minivan	2005–2007
Saturn Sky	Roadster	2007–2010
Saturn Outlook	Full-size crossover	2007–2010
Saturn Aura	Mid-size sedan	2007–2010
Saturn Vue (2nd Generation)	Compact crossover	2008–2010
Saturn Astra	Compact 3– and 5-door hatchback	2008–2009

=== Concepts ===
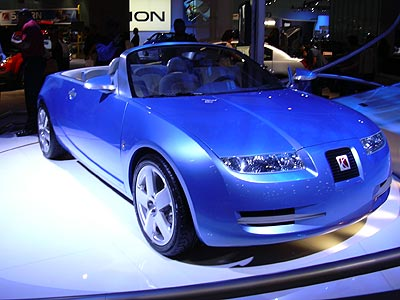
2002 Saturn Sky concept

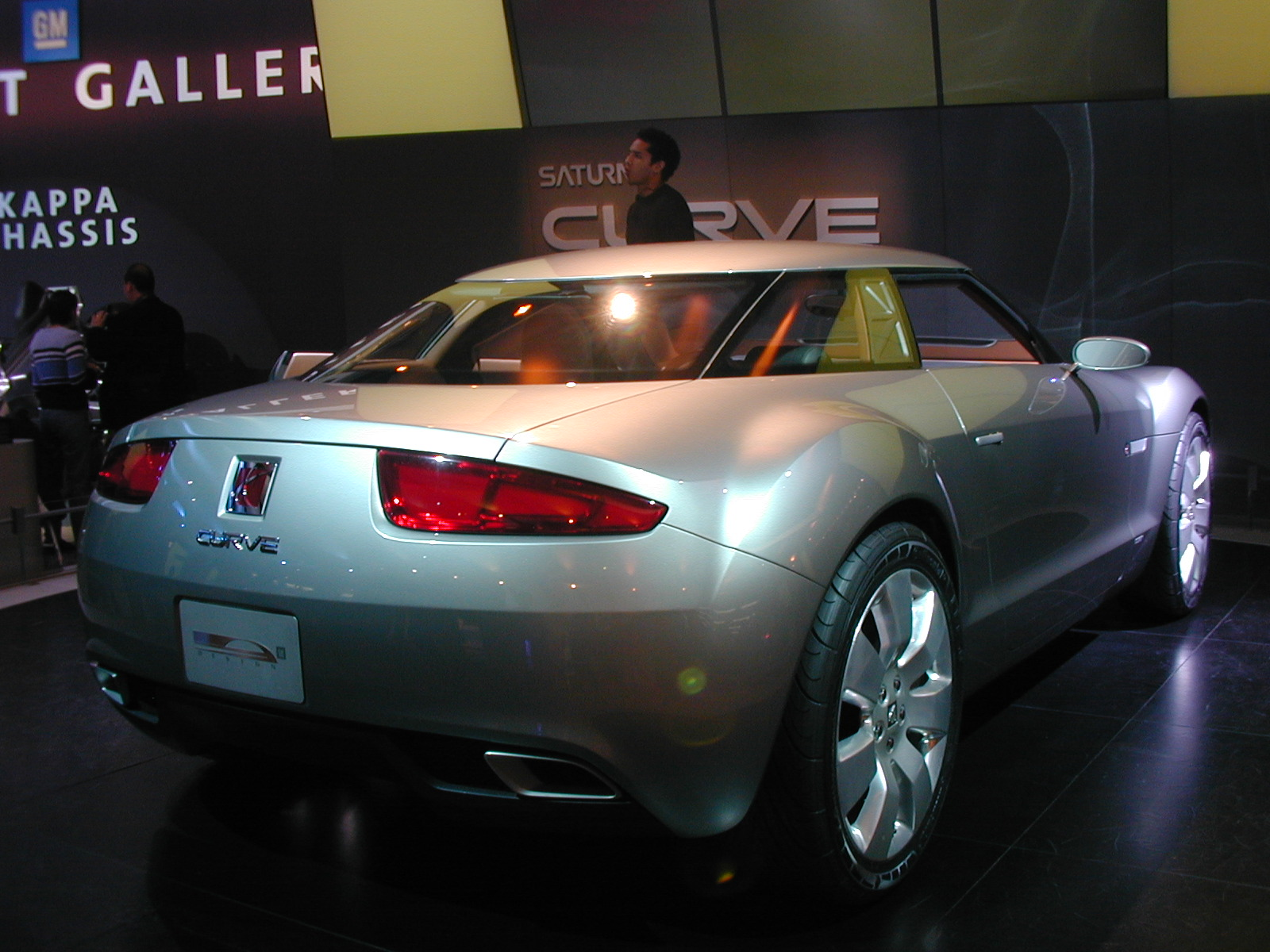
2004 Saturn Curve

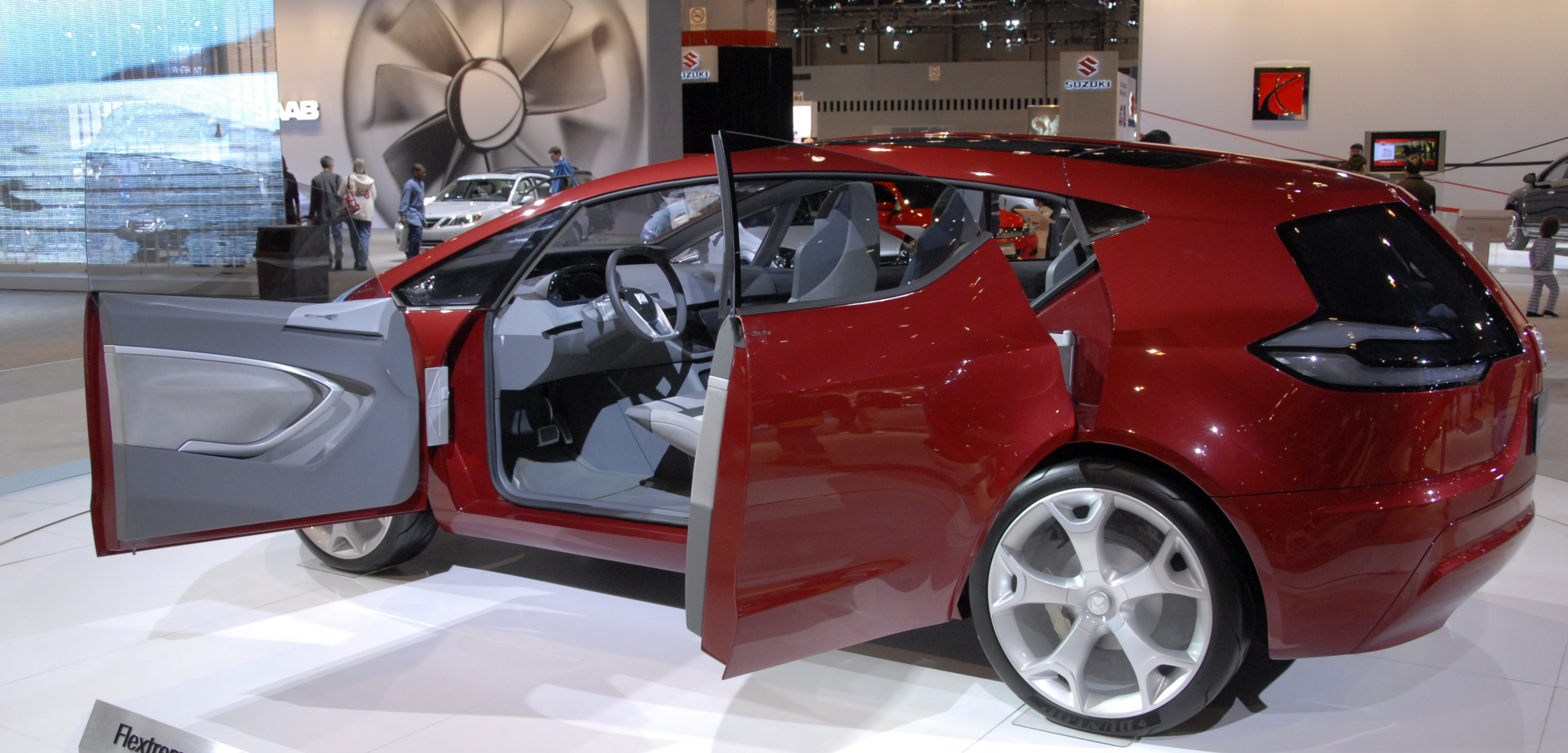
2009 Saturn Flextreme

- Saturn Prototype (1984)
- Saturn Prototype (1988)
- Saturn Sport Sedan Concept (1990)
- Saturn SL3 (1994)
- Saturn SC Performance Edition (1999)
- Saturn CV-1 (2000)
- Saturn SCX (2001)
- Saturn LST (2001)
- Saturn Vue Urban Expression (2001)
- Saturn Vue Outdoor Expression (2001)
- Saturn SC2 Concept (2002)
- Saturn Sky Concept (2002)
- Saturn ION·EFX (2002)
- Saturn ION QC/T (2003)
- Saturn ION Rally (2003)
- Saturn Vue Red Line Street Play (2004)
- Saturn Vue "Spring Special" (2004)
- Saturn Curve (2004)
- Saturn Aura Concept (2005)
- Saturn Outlook Adventure (2006)
- Saturn PreVue (2006)
- Saturn Astra Tuner (2007)
- Saturn Flextreme (2008)
- Saturn Vue Greenline Hyline (2008)
- Saturn Vue Hybrid 2-Mode (2009)

Slogans

- A Different Kind Of Car Company (1990–1994)
- A Different Kind Of Company, A Different Kind Of Car (1994–2002)
- It's Different In A Saturn (2002–2004)
- People First (2004–2006)
- Like Always. Like Never Before. (2006–2007)
- Rethink American (2007)
- Rethink (2008–2010)

== Awards ==
- 1991
  - Saturn receives two "Silver Anvil" awards for community and internal relations.
  - Saturn receives Popular Mechanics "Design and Engineering" award for "manufacturing processes that result in exceptionally high quality for an all-new vehicle."
  - Saturn receives "Driver's Choice awards for best small car" from MotorWeek.
- 1992
  - Saturn receives "Driver's Choice awards for best small car" from MotorWeek.
  - Saturn is in the "Top Ten Domestic Buys" according to Motor Trend magazine.
  - Saturn receives the "EVE" award for Saturn's attempt to employ women and minorities.
- 1993
  - Saturn receives the Best American Car Value Under 13,000; Lowest Total Cost To Own—American Car; Best Overall Value—Compact Class under 16,500; from Intellichoice.
  - Saturn receives Technology of the Year from Automobile Magazine.
- 1995
  - Saturn receives Best American Car Value under 13,000; Best Compact Under 17,000; Best Subcompact over 12,500; from Intellichoice.
- 1996
  - Saturn receives Best American Car Value under 20,000; Best Compact Value under 17,000 (import or domestic); by Intellichoice.
  - Saturn receives the award for Best Small Wagon (import or domestic).
  - Saturn receives the award for Best Subcompact value under 12,000 (import or domestic).
  - Saturn receives the award for Best Subcompact value over 12,500 (import or domestic).
- 1997
  - Saturn receives Best Car Value Under 20,000; Best Compact Value under 15,000; Best Subcompact Value under 14,000; Best Small Wagon Value; from Intellichoice.
  - Saturn is the Leader in "Brands under 20,000".
- 1999
  - Saturn receives awards for Best Compact Value under 20,000; Best Small Wagon Value.
  - Saturn S-Series gets a Double 5-Star rating in Driver & Passenger in front-collision tests.
- 2000
  - Saturn is voted MotorWeek's "Best Family Sedan".
  - Saturn receives "Best Overall Value of the Year" for the SL1, and SL2 from Intellichoice.
  - Saturn in Spring Hill receives "Most Valuable Pollution Prevention."
- 2007
  - Saturn's 2007 Aura claims North American Car of the Year.
- 2008
  - Saturn's Outlook receives Parents Magazine/Edmunds.com "Best Family Car 2008", "Best Crossover Utility" by MotorWeek Drivers, "Best New Family Vehicle" from kbb.com.

== Plants ==
- Ramos Arizpe, Coahuila, Mexico (General Motors) – Vue (2008–2010)
- Spring Hill, Tennessee, (Spring Hill Manufacturing) – S-Series (1991–2002), Vue (2002–2007), ION (2003–2007)
- Doraville, Georgia, (Doraville Assembly) — Relay (2005–2007)
- Fairfax District (Kansas City, Kansas) (General Motors) – Aura
- Antwerp. Belgium (General Motors Europe) – Astra
- Lansing Delta Township Assembly, Delta Charter Township, Michigan (General Motors) – Outlook
- Wilmington, Delaware (plant closed) – Sky, L series, Pontiac Solstice
