= Charles A. Barnard (politician) =

American politician

Charles A. Barnard (March 3, 1907 – November 2, 1956) was a member of the Wisconsin State Assembly.

== Biography ==
Barnard was born on March 3, 1907, in Brillion, Wisconsin. He graduated from Brillion High School before attending Lawrence University, the University of Wisconsin, and Marquette University Law School and becoming a lawyer. In 1931, he married Cecelia Lynch. They had two children. Barnard was a member of the Benevolent and Protective Order of Elks and the Knights of Columbus. He died at his home in Oshkosh, Wisconsin on November 2, 1956, following a myocardial infarction.

== Political career ==
Barnard was a member of the Assembly from 1929 to 1930. He was also a delegate to the 1932 Republican National Convention.
