= Brillion High School =

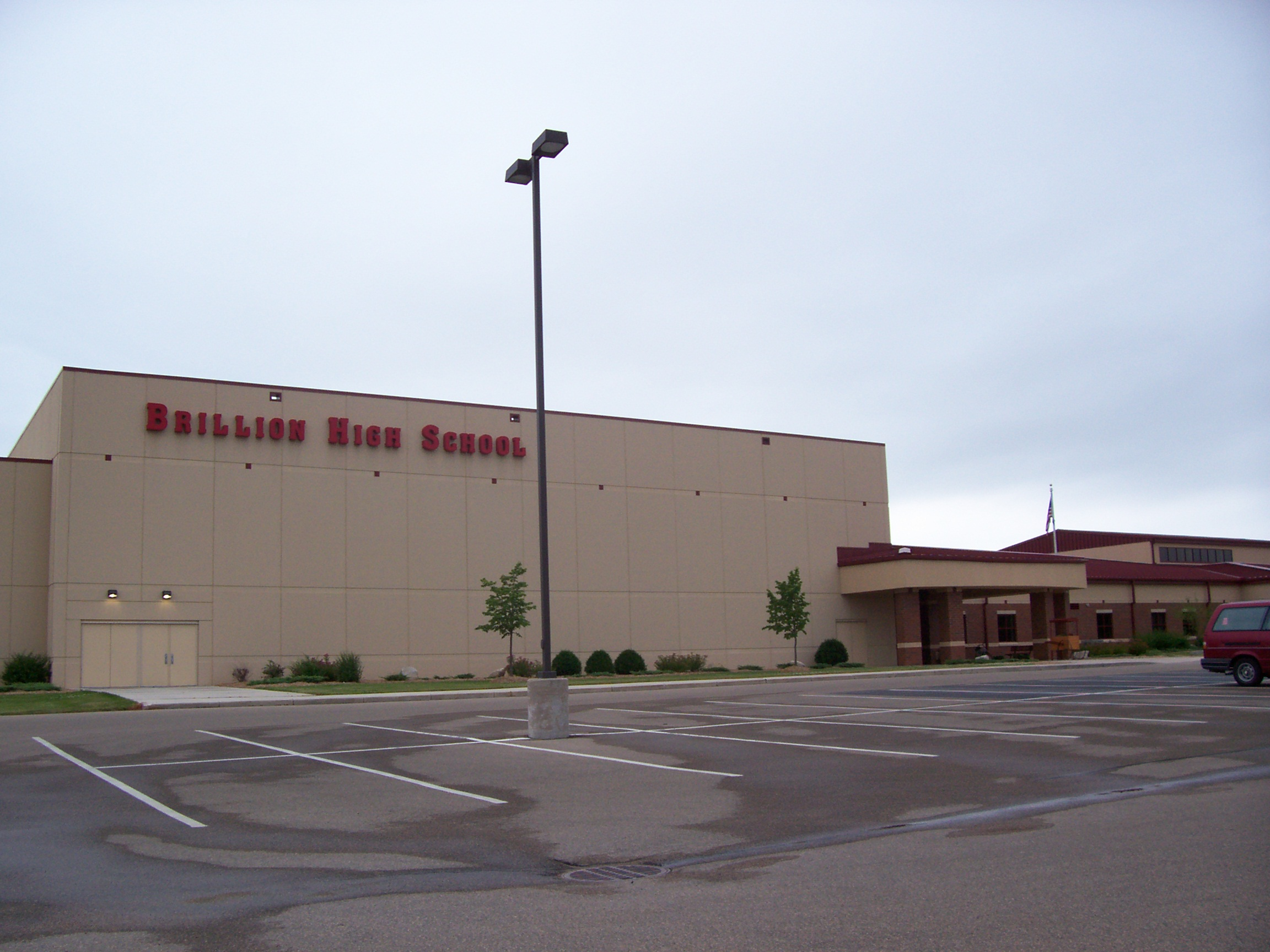

Location
- W1101 Cty HR; Brillion, Wisconsin 54110-1200
- Coordinates: 44°11′18.0″N 88°05′50.9″W

Information
- School type: Public
- School district: Brillion School District
- Principal: Peter Kittel
- Teaching staff: 24.78 (FTE)
- Grades: 9-12
- Enrolment: 315 (2023-2024)
- Student to teacher ratio: 12.71
- Color
- Athletics conference: Eastern Wisconsin Conference
- Mascot: Lion
- Nickname: Lions
- Website: https://www.brillionsd.org/o/bhs

Brillion High School is a public secondary school located in Brillion, Wisconsin, approximately 20 miles south of Green Bay. Enrollment is for grades 9 through 12 with approximately 320 students.

== Demographics ==
BHS is 91 percent white, six percent Hispanic, and all other races make up the remaining three percent. Approximately a quarter of Brillion students qualify for free or reduced-price lunch.

== Academics ==
Brillion students have the opportunity to take Advanced Placement classes. About a quarter of students take AP classes.

In 2007, local company Ariens gave BHS $1.5 million to make a larger STEM area in the school.

In March 2018, the school announced a decision to change from semester scheduling to trimester scheduling for the 2018–2019 school year.

== Extracurriculars ==
BHS has worked with Special Olympics to bring a chapter of Project Unify to the school, which helps special needs students socially.

== Performing arts ==
Brillion had a competitive show choir in the 1990s; the program lived on as a noncompetitive swing choir in the 2000s and early 2010s. A 600-seat theater, the Endries Performing Arts Center, is located on the BHS campus.

== Athletics ==
Brillion's athletic teams are called the Lions, and they have belonged to the Eastern Wisconsin Conference since 2015.

=== Athletic conference affiliation history ===
- Eastern Wisconsin Conference (1923-1924)
- Little Nine Conference (1928-1951)
- Eastern Wisconsin Conference (1951-1965)
- Little Nine Conference (1965-1970)
- Olympian Conference (1970-2015)
- Eastern Wisconsin Conference (2015–present)
