= General Motors Z platform =

The Z platform or Z-body automobile platform designation was used on three different types of vehicles made by General Motors.

== Chevrolet Corvair ==
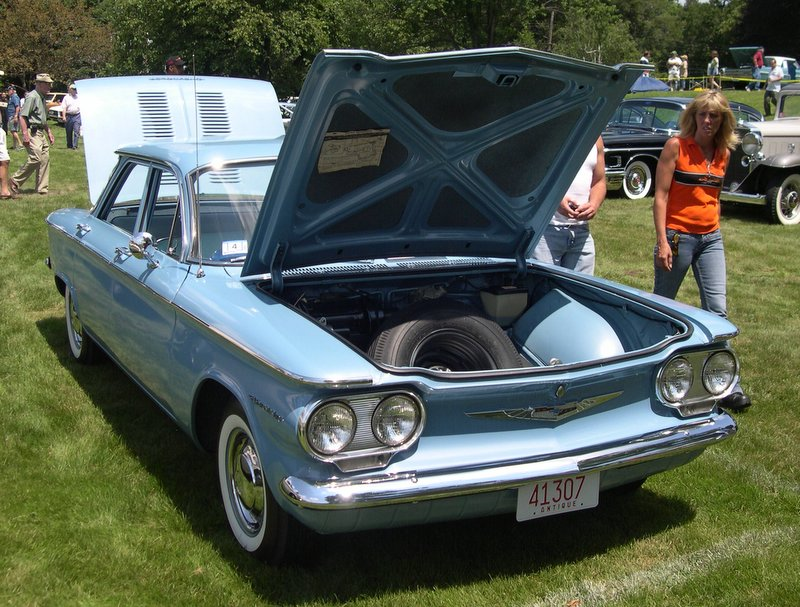
1960 Chevrolet Corvair

The first was both generations of the Chevrolet Corvair from 1960 to 1969, which were a rear-wheel-drive and rear-engine compact car. The platform was also modified to be used on the Chevrolet Corvair 95 series of vans and pickup trucks from 1961–1965.

- The Corvair featured a rear-mounted six-cylinder Chevrolet Turbo-Air 6 engine that included many aluminum components and an aluminum block, along with a rear swing-axle (up to 1964) suspension and rear transaxle. From 1965 the rear suspension was similar to the then current Corvette except that coils were used in place of a transverse leaf.

Vehicles using the rear-drive/rear-engine Z-body include:

- 1960–1969 Chevrolet Corvair 500
- 1960–1969 Chevrolet Corvair Monza
- 1961–1965 Chevrolet Corvair 95 series
- 1965–1966 Chevrolet Corvair Corsa

== Chevrolet Corvette ==
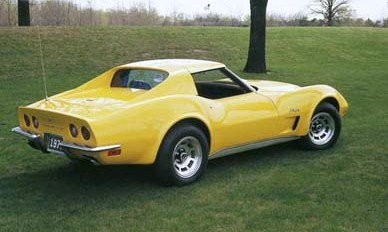
1973 Corvette Stingray Coupe

The second was the Corvette from 1972 until 1975 when the second Y platform was developed for the Corvette. The second digit in the vehicle identification number displays vehicles that used this platform followed by either Body Style 37 for coupe or 67 for convertible.

Vehicles using the front-engine/rear-drive Z-body include:

- 1972–1975 Chevrolet Corvette Stingray Sport Coupe
- 1972–1975 Chevrolet Corvette Stingray convertible

== Saturn S-Series ==
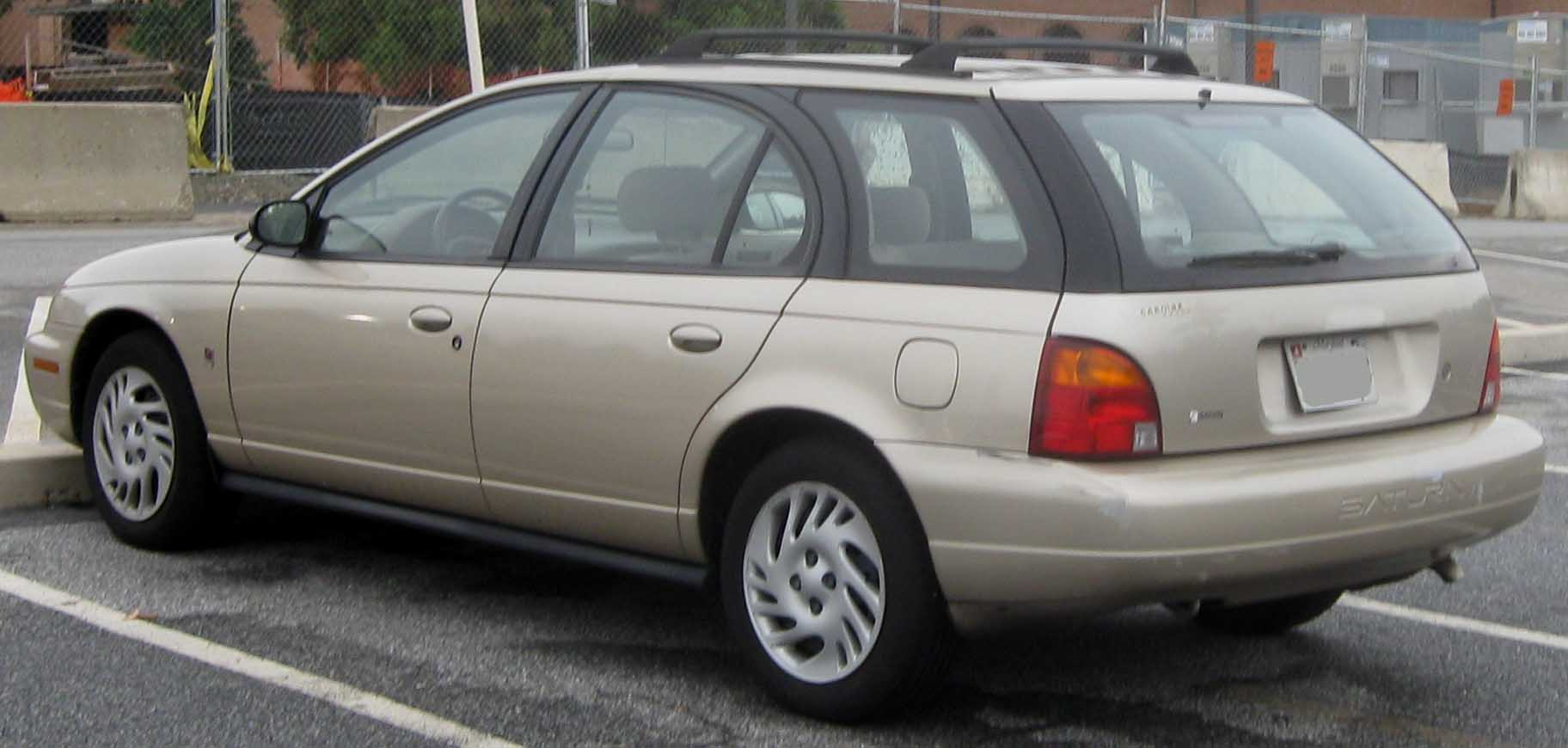
1996–1999 Saturn SW

The third was Saturn's automobile platform from its debut in 1990 until 2002, which were front-wheel drive compact cars. This platform was replaced with the GM Delta platform.

Vehicles using the front-drive/front-engine Z-body include:

- 1991–2002 Saturn SC
- 1991–2002 Saturn SL
- 1993–2001 Saturn SW

== See also ==
- List of General Motors platforms
