= Saturn S-Series =

Compact car

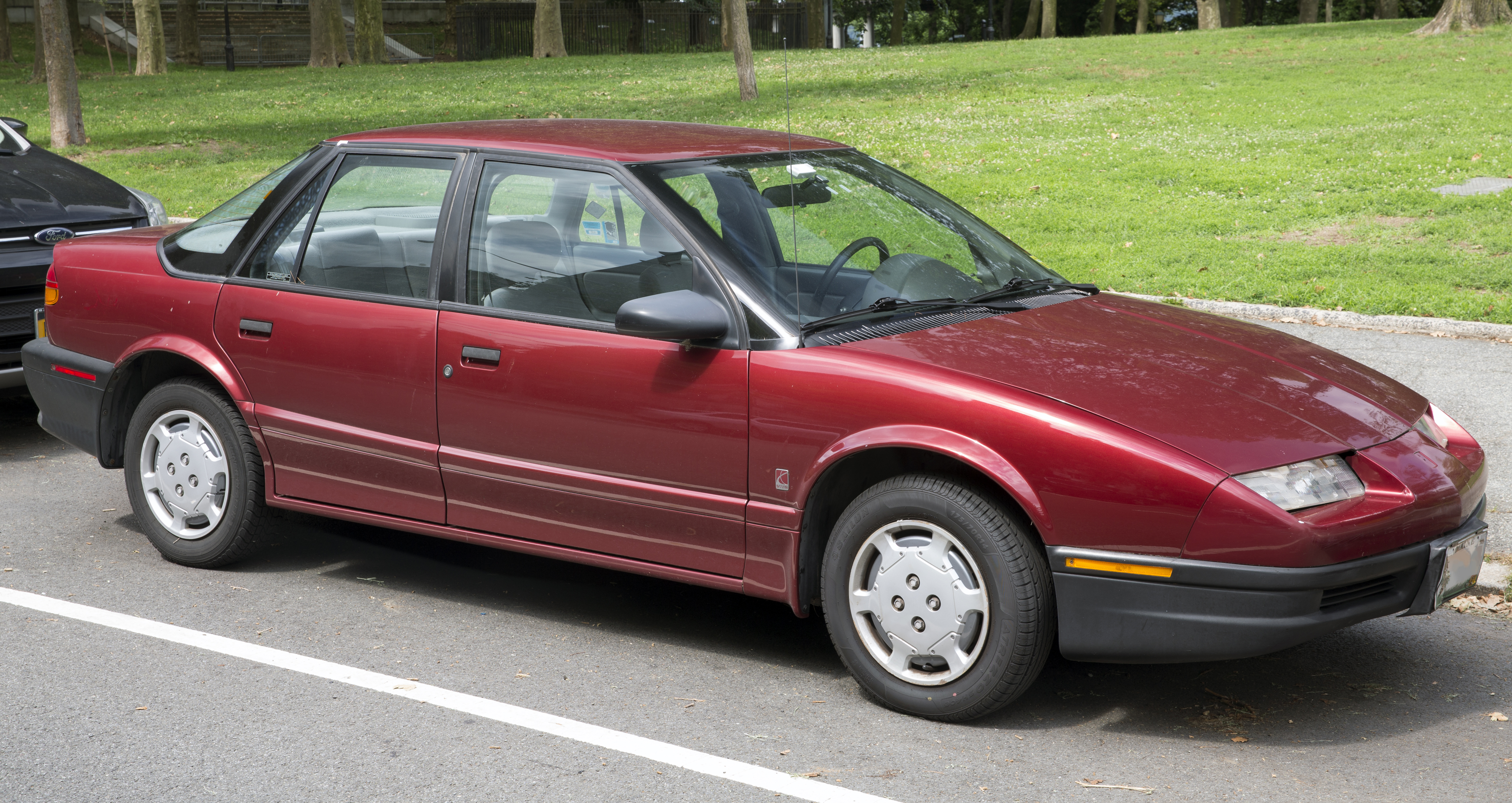
- First generation Saturn SL1 (1995)

Overview
- Manufacturer: Saturn Corporation (General Motors)
- Production: 1990–2002
- Model years: 1991–2002
- Assembly: United States: Spring Hill, Tennessee (Spring Hill Manufacturing)

Body and chassis
- Class: Compact car
- Layout: Transverse front-engine, front-wheel drive
- Platform: GM Z platform

Chronology
- Successor: Saturn Ion

The Saturn S-Series is a family of compact cars from the Saturn automobile company of General Motors. With this car, Saturn pioneered their brand-wide "no-haggle" sales technique.

Its automobile platform, the Z-body, developed in-house at Saturn and sharing little with other General Motors platforms, used a spaceframe design. Pioneered on the Pontiac Fiero during the 1980s, the spaceframe used non-load-carrying plastic side panels. These polymer panels were dent-resistant, something that remained Saturn's unique selling proposition until a few years before the brand was discontinued.

The S-Series was marketed in three generations from the fall of 1990 for the 1991 model year through the end of the 2002 model year. The model changes took place for the 1997 and 2000 model years.

== History ==
The S-Series debuted for the 1991 model year with the Sport Coupe (SC) and Sedan Level (SL) models. The SC was only available with the DOHC (Dual Overhead Cam) engine whereas the SLs had an option for the SOHC (Single Overhead Cam) engine (SL1) or the DOHC (SL2).

For the 1993 model year, the SC gained an SOHC option (SC1) in addition to the existing DOHC option (SC2, renamed from SC). The SL & SC families were joined by the SW (Station Wagon) models, in both SW1 and SW2 flavors.

The S-Series all used either the SOHC LK0/L24 or the DOHC LL0 version of the completely original, designed in-house Saturn 1.9L engine. SL1s, SC1s, and SW1s were only offered with the MP2 manual transmission and the MP6 automatic, while SL2, SC2 and SW2 models came with either the MP3 manual or MP7 automatic. The only difference in each case is the selection of gear ratios, with the SOHC-associated transmissions being geared taller for more efficiency, and the DOHC-associated transmissions having shorter, more closely spaced ratios for performance. As a result, it's not uncommon for enthusiast-owners to swap a tall-geared MP2 manual into a car equipped with a DOHC engine for better fuel economy on the highway.

Aside from the engine and transmission, the level 2 models also included 15-inch instead of 14-inch wheels, a correspondingly larger tire size, EVO steering, a rear swaybar, the option of rear disc brakes (standard on the 1991–1992 SC), color-matched bumpers and door handles, and more interior options such as power locks, power windows, rear defroster, & a sunroof (SC2 only). Aside from the wheel size, it was almost impossible to tell a 1 from a 2 externally, except for the SC2s which had retractable headlamps throughout the 1996 model year.

A redesign beginning with the 1999 model year gave the SC a small suicide door (more correctly a clamshell door) on the driver's side to improve rear-seat access, which Saturn claimed was the world's first three-door coupe. This type of door had previously been used in extended cab pickup trucks, but was an innovation in coupe design. Examples of this solution for coupes were the 1997 Pontiac Rageous and Mercury MC4 concept cars with similar doors. In late 1999, Mazda unveiled a concept car for the future RX-8 with such doors, the production version of which entered production simultaneously with the Ion, with doors on both sides.

The level 1 S-Series equipped with a manual transmission were among the most fuel-efficient cars available in the United States when they were produced, reaching 40 miles per US gallon (5.9 L/100 km; 48 mpg_{‑imp}) in EPA highway tests at the time (this would likely translate to 36 miles per US gallon (6.5 L/100 km; 43 mpg_{‑imp}) under current methodologies).

The S-Series was replaced by the Saturn ION for the 2003 model year.

=== Export markets ===
Taiwan and Japan were the only two Asian countries to import Saturns. From June 1992 to 1996, the first- and second-generation sedans plus the first-generation coupes were sold in Taiwan. Taiwan was selected as a way to test the car's competitiveness in what was a small, level market, with most international players present and with no significant domestic brands. From 1997 to 2001, the second-generation versions were sold in right-hand drive in Japan. Some Toyota Netz dealerships and former Isuzu dealerships also offered Saturn products until 2001.

Canada imported all available Saturn models from 1992 onward.

== First generation (1991) ==
First generation
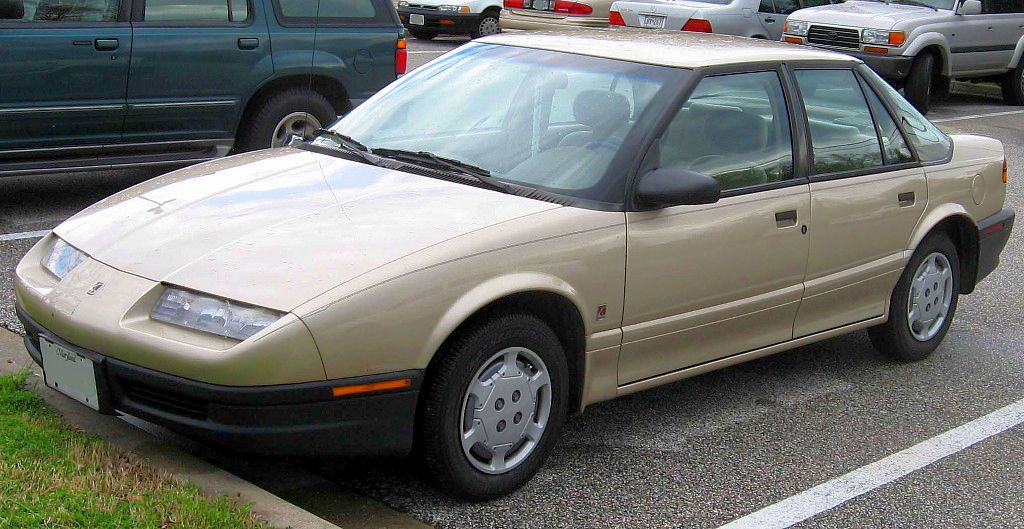

Overview
- Also called: Saturn SL; Saturn SW; Saturn SC; Sauber Messager
- Production: 1990–1995 (SL); 1993–1995 (SW); 1990–1996 (SC)
- Model years: 1991–1995

Body and chassis
- Body style: 2-door coupe 4-door sedan 5-door station wagon

Powertrain
- Engine: 1.9 L LK0/L24 I4; 1.9 L LL0 DOHC I4
- Transmission: 5-speed MP2/MP3 manual; 4-speed MP6/MP7 automatic

Dimensions
- Wheelbase: SL & SW: 102.4 in (2,600 mm); SC: 99.2 in (2,520 mm)
- Length: SL & SW: 176.3 in (4,478 mm); 1990–93 SC: 175.8 in (4,465 mm); 1994–96 SC1: 173.2 in (4,399 mm); 1994–96 SC2: 174.6 in (4,435 mm)
- Width: 67.6 in (1,717 mm)
- Height: SC: 50.6 in (1,285 mm); SL: 52.5 in (1,334 mm); SW: 53.7 in (1,364 mm)
- Curb weight: SC: 2,293.9–2,416.7 lb (1,040–1,096 kg); SL: 2,320.5–2,456.5 lb (1,053–1,114 kg); SW: 2,397.3–2,499.4 lb (1,087–1,134 kg)

=== First generation SL ===
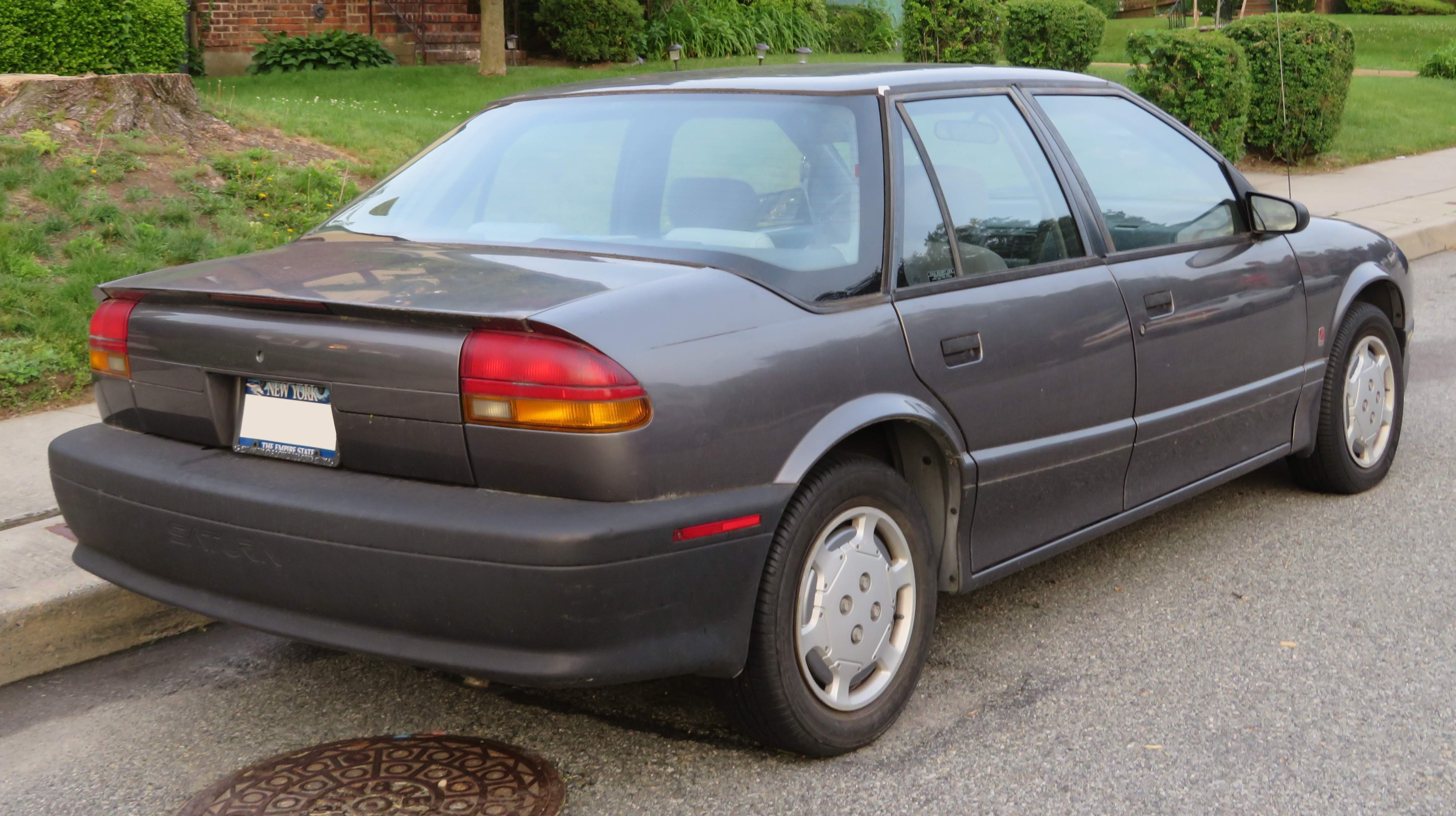
Saturn SL

The first generation SL was constructed for the 1991 to 1995 model years, with the first Saturn rolling off the assembly line in the Spring Hill, Tennessee factory on July 30, 1990, the same day that then-CEO of GM, Roger Bonham Smith, retired. It was maroon with a tan interior.

From 1991 to 1992, the Saturn SL-series Sedan trim levels consisted of the SL, the SL1, and the SL2.

The base SL model featured the MP2 5-speed manual transmission only, and it had manual steering. On the exterior, the car featured unique hubcaps different from the SL1 and came equipped with only a driver's side exterior mirror (a passenger mirror was a popular dealer-installed option). On the inside, the SL featured a standard AM/FM radio with no cassette player and lower-grade cloth material on the seats. Some factory options such as power windows, power locks, or cruise control were not available on the SL but air conditioning and an AM/FM/cassette radio were available on the option sheet. The SL1 trim level added power steering, a passenger mirror, different hubcaps for the 14-inch wheels, an AM/FM cassette player, and softer cloth material on the seats. It featured as standard equipment the same MP2 manual or the MP6 4-speed automatic transmission could be had as an option. The SL1 could be optioned with power windows, power locks, power mirror (passenger side only - driver's side retained manual control), cruise control, and air conditioning. Both were offered only with the SOHC 1.9L I4 "LK0" engine that produced 85 hp (63 kW), which was rated at 27 mpg (8.7L/100 km/32 mpg) City, 34 mpg (6.9L/100 km; 41 mpg) Highway. The SL2 trim level featured the MP3 5-speed manual transmission, or the MP7 4-speed automatic transmission, both exclusively with the DOHC 1.9L I4 LL0 engine that was rated at 123 hp (92 kW), 24 mpg (9.8L/100 km; 29 mpg) City, 34 mpg (6.9L/100 km; 41 mpg) Highway. The SL2 also brought body-color bumpers, 15-inch steel wheels (alloys were optional), and higher spec cloth on the seats (including the seatbacks - on SL and SL1 the seatbacks were vinyl). SL2's could be optioned with power windows, locks, mirror (again, pass. side only), cruise control, air conditioning, sunroof, and leather seats. Anti-lock brakes were available as an option as well, which brought along rear disc brakes.

For the 1995 model year, the seatbelts were changed from the power passive restraint type to the conventional 3-point type. The interior of the vehicle was redesigned with a new dashboard and the addition of a front passenger's airbag. The center console was updated as well, adding previously absent cup holders. Also for 1995, the SOHC (LK0) engine was given MPFI to create the 100 hp (75 kW) L24 engine.

The S-Series had a 12.8 US gallons (48 L; 11 imp gal) fuel tank, which means that both cars got around 384 miles (618 km) on a single tank based on average of 32 mpg_{‑US} (7.4 L/100 km; 38 mpg_{‑imp}). Owners of the base model typically report real-world fuel mileage of about 38–41 mpg_{-US} (6.2–5.7 L/100 km; 46–49 mpg_{-imp}) on the highway with the manual transmission.

=== First generation SW ===
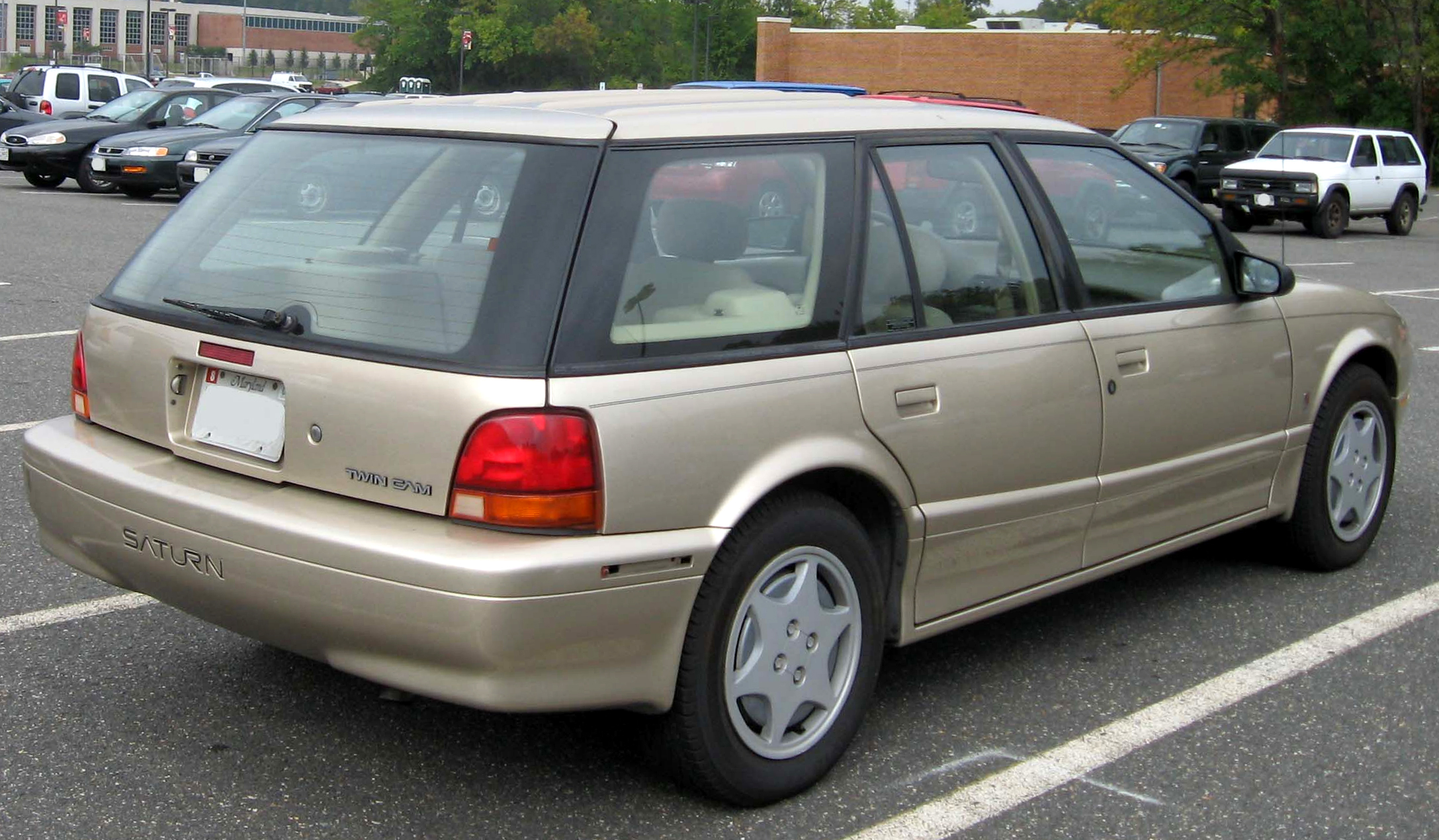
Saturn SW2

For the 1993 model year, a station wagon variant of the SL was added to the model lineup. This was offered in SW1 and SW2 trim levels. The station wagon used the same doors as the sedan, but the bodywork behind the C-pillar and the roof differed.

=== First generation SC ===
The first generation Saturn SC coupes were made from 1990 until 1996. The first generation Saturn SC coupes were originally only available in one trim level which was the SC.

The 1990–1992 Saturn SC featured a DOHC 1.9-liter LL0 inline-four engine that was rated at 123 hp (92 kW). For the 1993 model year, the original regular SC coupe model was renamed as the SC2 and a new SC1 trim level was introduced. For the 1994 model year, the SC1 and the SC2 had both gotten revised power door locks and a recalibrated automatic transmission. The first generation SC2 had received a minor refresh in 1995 in which the lower front bumper and the vehicle's taillights were both updated. For the 1995 model year, both the SC1 and the SC2 had gotten a redesigned interior with a new redesigned dashboard with a front passenger's airbag.

The first generation SC1 coupe featured a SOHC 1.9-liter LK0 inline-four engine that was rated at 85 hp (63 kW). The SC1's engine was later upgraded to the 100 hp (75 kW) L24 engine for the 1995 model year.

The first generation Saturn SC1 coupes shared the same fixed headlight front fascia as the SL sedans and the SW station wagons, rather than the pop-up headlight design used on the SC2 and the original SC. The SC1 also lacked a rear trunk lid reflector and a rear stabilizer bar.

=== SL3 ===
For the 1994 model year, a highest-trim "SL3" model was reportedly being considered. Saturn owner's manuals from this period made mention of the SL3 - it would have featured an SC front end on an SL2 body, with all options as standard.

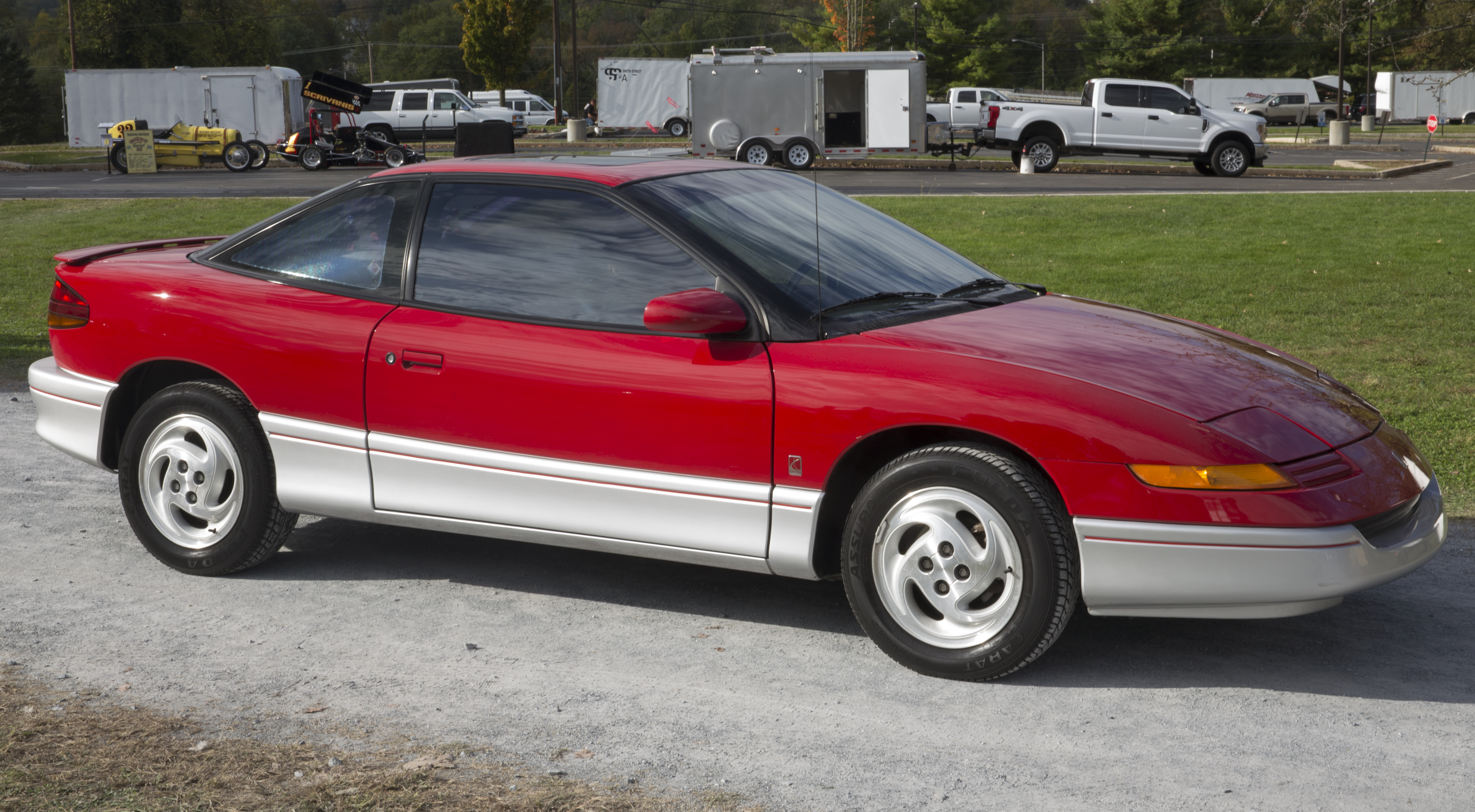
1992 Saturn SC (pre-facelift)

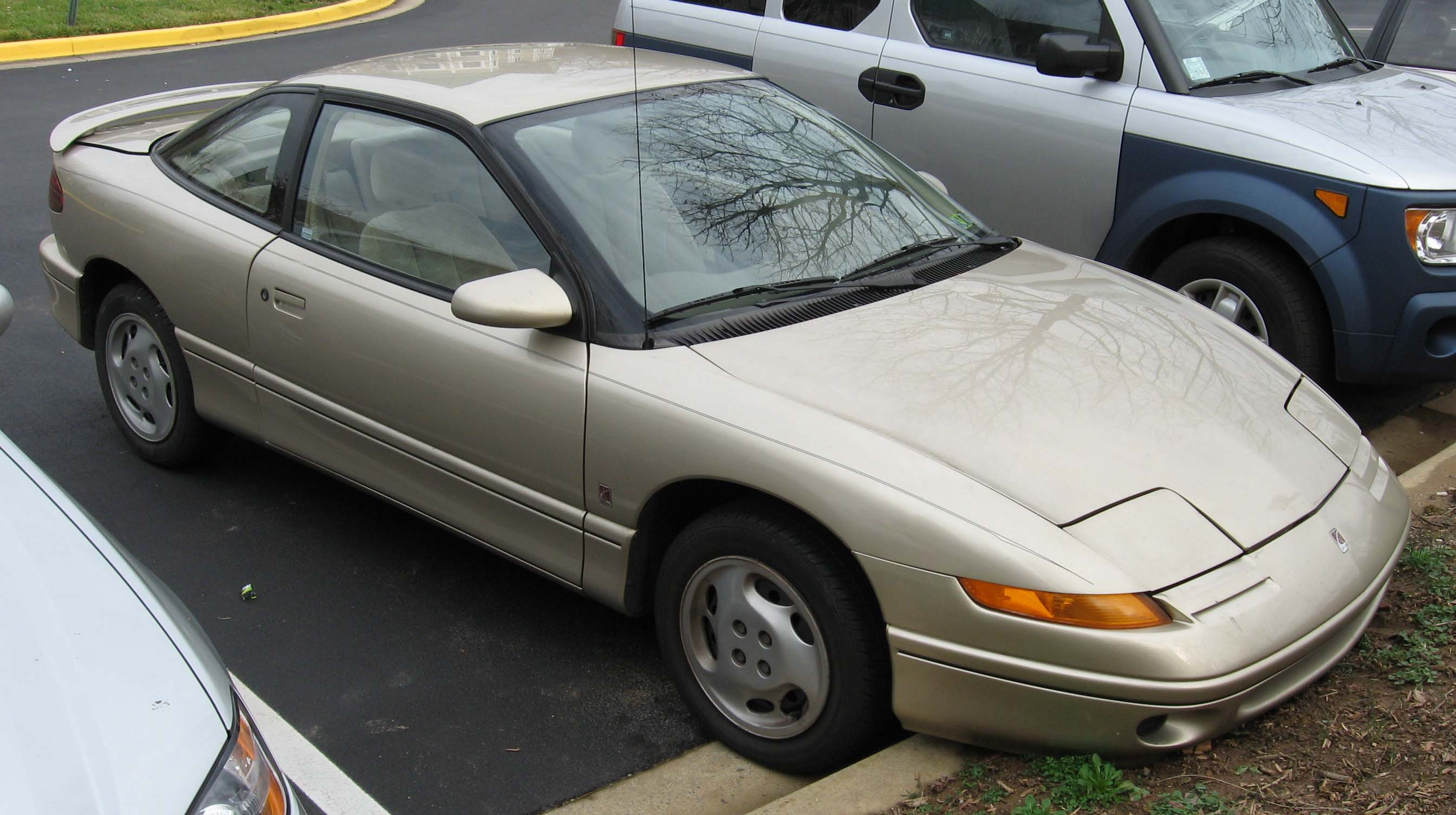
1995–1996 Saturn SC2

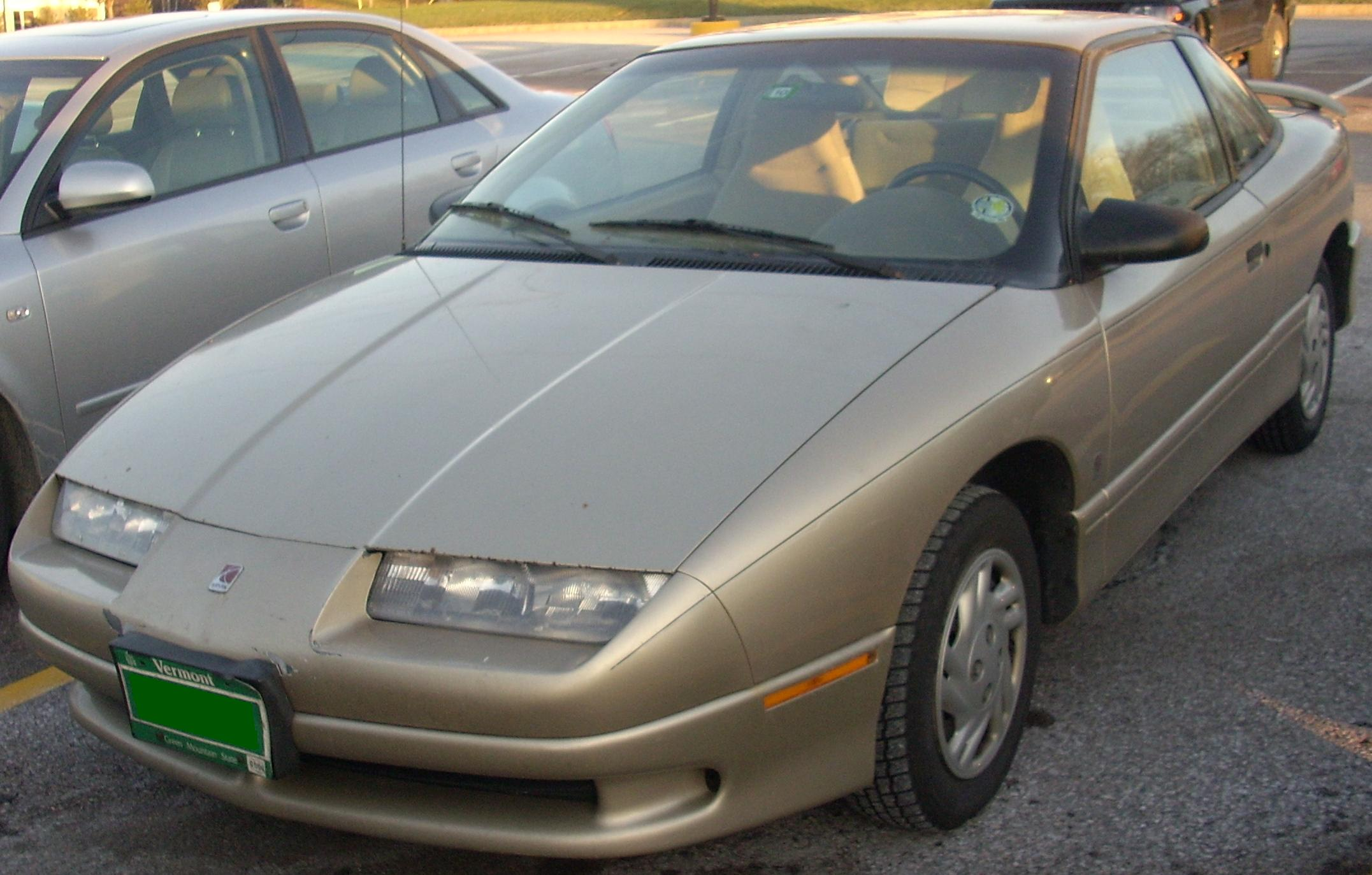
1995–1996 Saturn SC1

== Second generation (1996) ==
Second generation
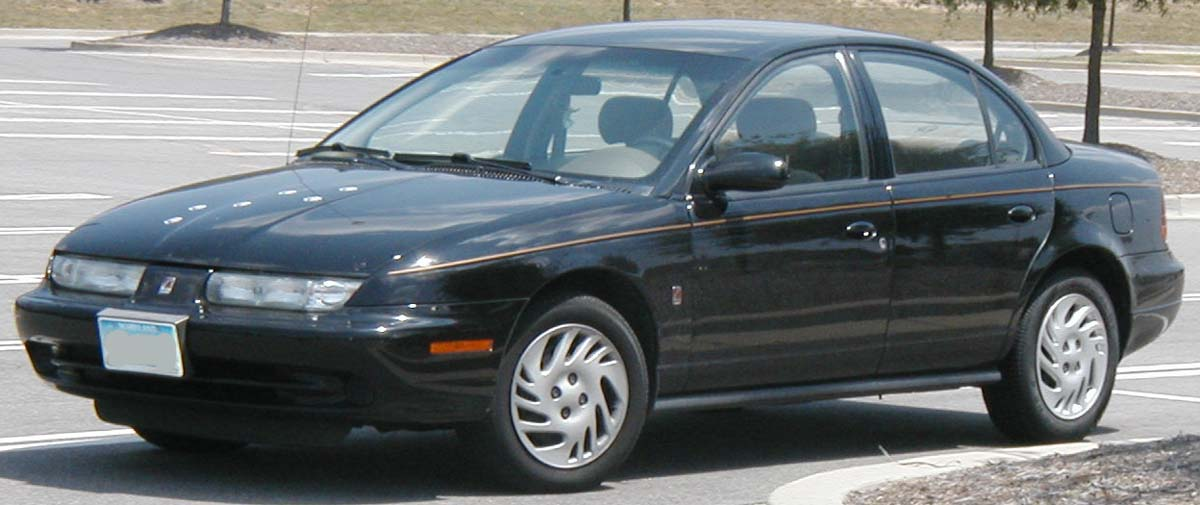

Overview
- Also called: Saturn SL1/SL2; Saturn SW1/SW2; Saturn SC1/SC2
- Production: 1996–1999 (SL/SW); 1997–1999 (SC)
- Model years: 1996–1999

Body and chassis
- Body style: 2-door coupe (1997–1998); 3-door coupe (1999–2002); 4-door sedan 5-door station wagon

Powertrain
- Engine: 1.9 L L24 I4; 1.9 L LL0 DOHC I4
- Transmission: 4-speed Saturn MP6 automatic 4-speed Saturn MP7 automatic 5-speed Saturn MP2 manual 5-speed Saturn MP3 manual

Dimensions
- Wheelbase: 102.4 in (2,600 mm)
- Length: 1996–99 SW & 1996–97 SL: 176.8 in (4,491 mm); 1998–99 SL: 176.9 in (4,493 mm)
- Width: 1996–99 SW: 66.7 in (1,694 mm); 1997–2000 SC: 67.3 in (1,709 mm); 1996–99 SL: 66.7 in (1,694 mm)
- Height: 1996–99 SW & SL: 54.5 in (1,384 mm)

=== Second generation SL and SW ===
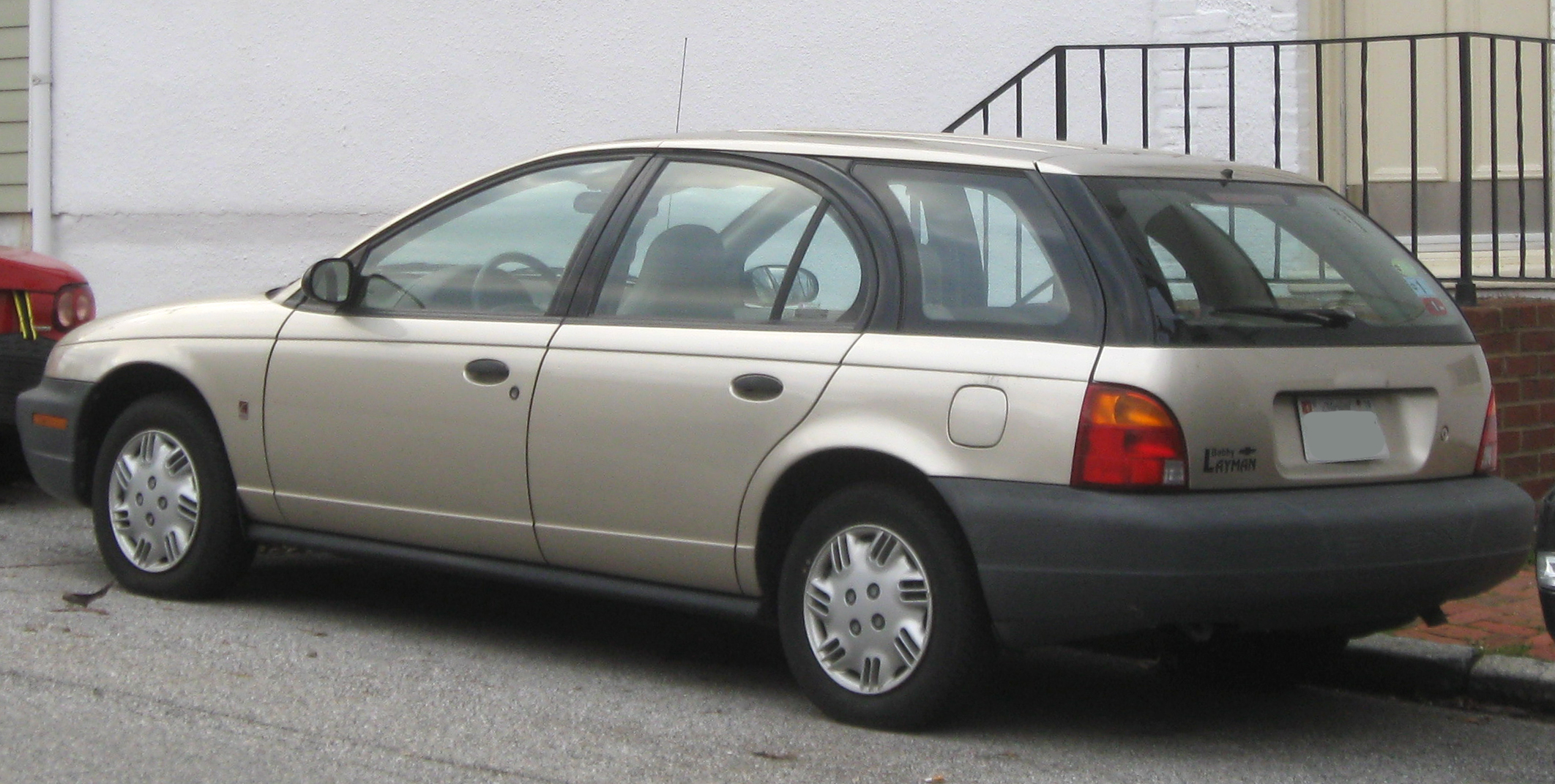
1996–1999 Saturn SW1

The second generation SL sedans and SW station wagons were made from 1996 to 1999. They both featured a completely redesigned exterior. The interior was mostly the same as on the first generation vehicles, while mechanically they went largely untouched. The redesigned second generation S-Series went on sale in 1995 for the 1996 model year.

A few minor changes were made for the 1998 model year S-Series vehicles. Due to multiple complaints about the noise coming from the vehicle's trip odometer that had been in all of the Saturn S-Series since 1995, had replaced with a new type of trip odometer in an effort to correct the problem. For the 1998 model year, a new cluster with a digital trip odometer had been introduced. Rear disc-brakes were no longer available as an option on the S-Series due to high costs for them as well as very little improvement in braking performance over the conventional rear drum-brakes setup.

Beginning with all of the Saturn S-Series vehicles that were made in late 1999 (sometimes referred to as 1999.5 models) had received improvements to both the SOHC and the DOHC engines in the S-Series. These changes included revised pistons, new connecting rods, and new crankshaft counterweights in the engine as well. The Twin Cam cylinder head had now featured a new roller-rocker setup with hydraulic tappets and roller cams replacing the conventional bucket lifter setup of the previous engine in the S-Series.

Also introduced for the 1999 model year S-Series vehicles that were sold in California was a different type of exhaust manifold that housed an upstream catalytic converter (this converter had heated up much faster than the conventional unit, and it had also decreased exhaust emissions faster as well), and it also had provisions for an air-injection reaction system (This had injected fresh air into the exhaust to reduce hydrocarbons during the startup of the vehicle, as it would help the oxygen sensors and catalytic converters reach their operating temperatures faster). These vehicles were made to meet the all-new CARB ULEV standards for the 1999 model year.

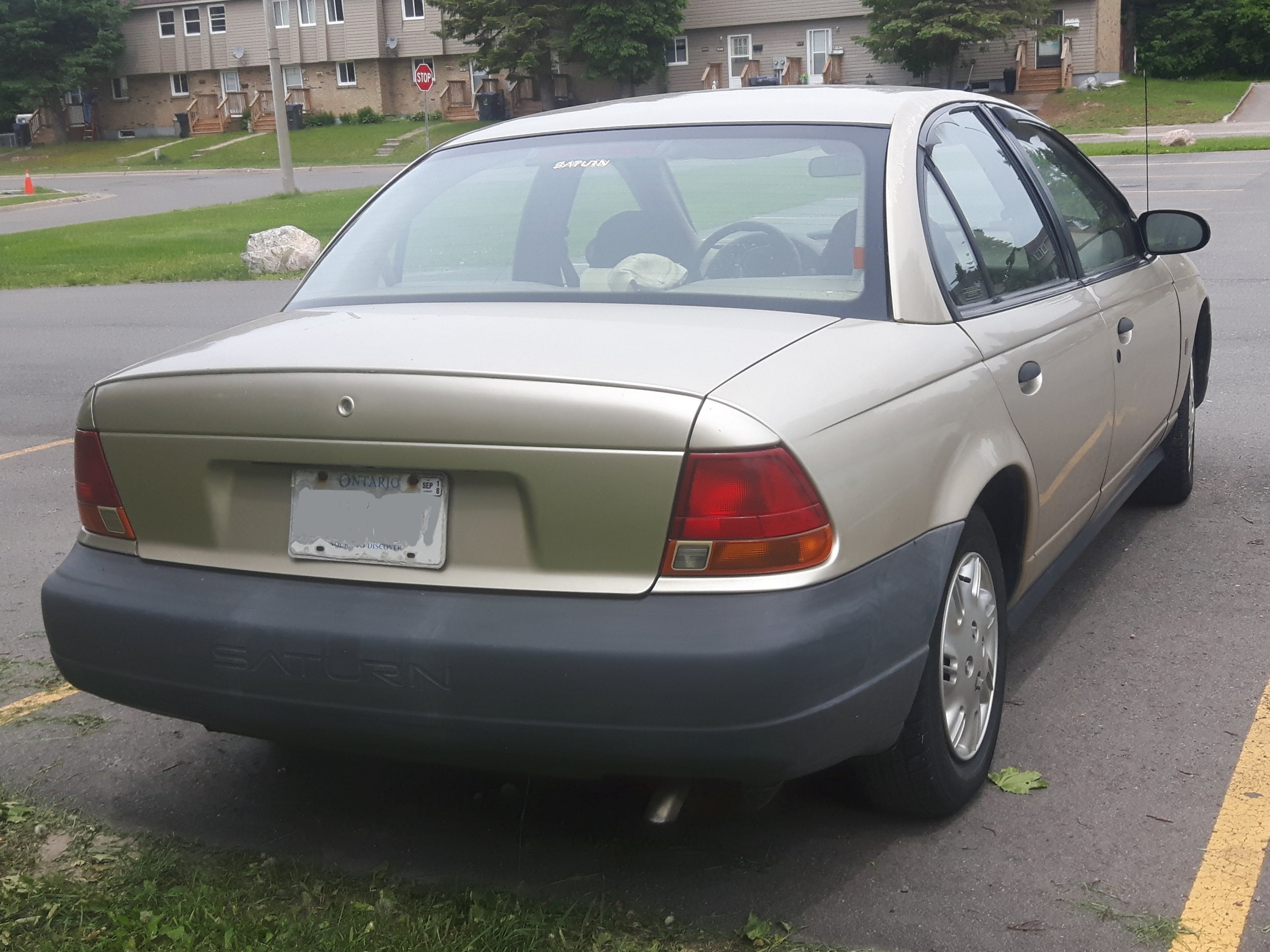
1996–1999 Saturn SL

To make additional use of the right-hand drive dashboard developed, there was also the 1999–2001 Saturn SWP "Postal" station wagon, intended to be marketed to rural route mail carriers. Only sold as a right-hand drive station wagon, 450 examples were built in 1999.

=== Second generation SC ===
The second generation SC coupes were made from 1997 until 2000. The second generation SC coupes had also moved to the longer wheelbase that the SL sedans and the SW station wagons had used, resulting in an equal wheelbase length across all S-Series models. The redesign had resulted in a more curved look for the SC coupes, which gave a slight increase in the vehicle's interior room/space, as well as a completely redesigned exterior of the vehicle itself. For the 1999 model year, a front-opening clamshell door was added to the driver's side of the vehicle. Even though this door on the driver's side of the vehicle had allowed easier access into the vehicle's rear seat, the driver's seat in the vehicle was also able to slide forward to allow easy access to the vehicle's rear seat as well. As a clamshell door, the rear driver's side door could not open unless the front door was open, because the door handle was on the inside of the door itself. Like the first generation SC coupes, the SC1 model lacked a rear sway bar. For the 2000 model year, the interior/engine/electronics were updated alongside the SL and SW models while the exterior remained unchanged.

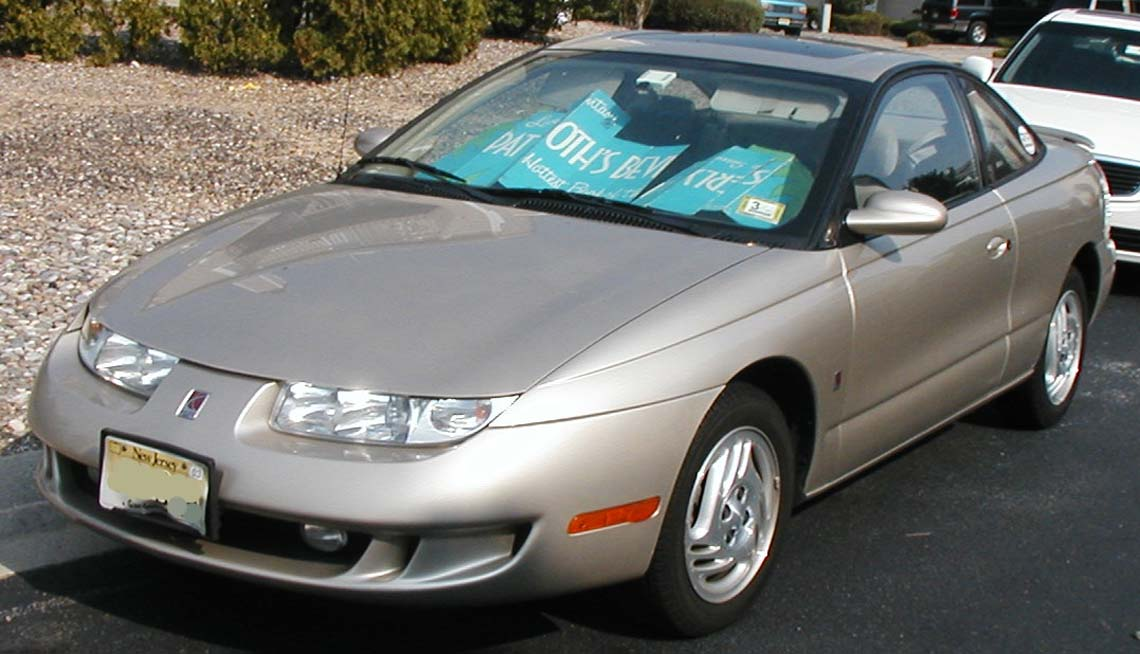
1997–1998 Saturn SC2 2-door

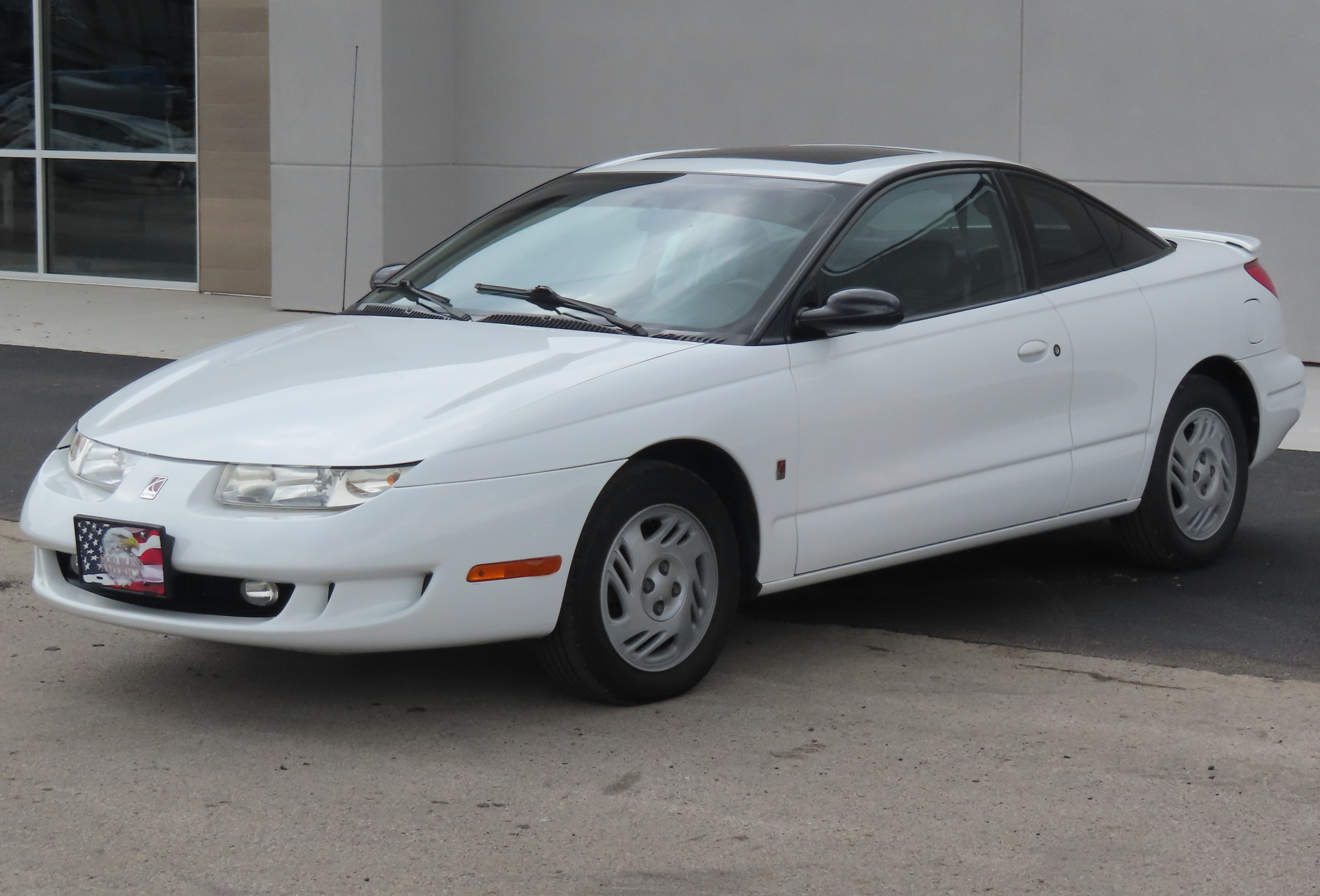
1999 Saturn SC2 3-door

=== In Japan ===
The second generation was imported to Japan with right-hand drive from 1997 until 2000 (sales of leftover stock continuing into 2001). It was available in all three bodystyles in one single trim level (SL2, SW2, SC2). Aside from having the steering wheel on the other side, Japanese market Saturns were also fitted with slightly different light units. The front indicators were mounted closer to the corners rather than inboard. The SL and SW's engine displacement and exterior dimensions were within the Japanese government's dimension regulations and engine tax brackets for compact cars. The SC2, however, was 30 mm (1.2 in) too wide and was subject to additional taxes. The only available engine was the 1.9-liter twin cam unit, producing 126 PS (93 kW; 124 hp) and 16.8 kg⋅m (165 N⋅m; 122 lb⋅ft) in Japanese specifications, coupled to either the five-speed manual (standard on the SC2, special order only on the SL2 and SW2) or four-speed automatic.

In spite of a remarkably low price, the Saturn was a flop in the Japanese market, where it played directly into the strengths of the Japanese manufacturers, comparing unfavorably with better-priced and more competent Japanese compact cars. The interior, especially, received criticism. A mere 602 units were sold in Saturn's first year in Japan (April to December 1997). Sales struggled to reach 100 cars per month in its first full year on the market. Another problem was that Japanese car dealers have always excelled at customer service; this meant that Saturn's main sales argument in the United States was meaningless in the Japanese market, where the "no-haggle" policy ran counter to the way Japanese buy cars. The introduction of Saturn was also ill-timed, as the economy was in the midst of a recession due to the effects of the 1980s "bubble economy". As the Japanese had less money to spend on "luxury goods", such as imported cars, Saturn found very few buyers.

As part of the launch campaign in Japan, Saturn had illustrator and model maker Akira Mizorogi create folding paper models of the three models available.

== Third generation (2000) ==
Third generation
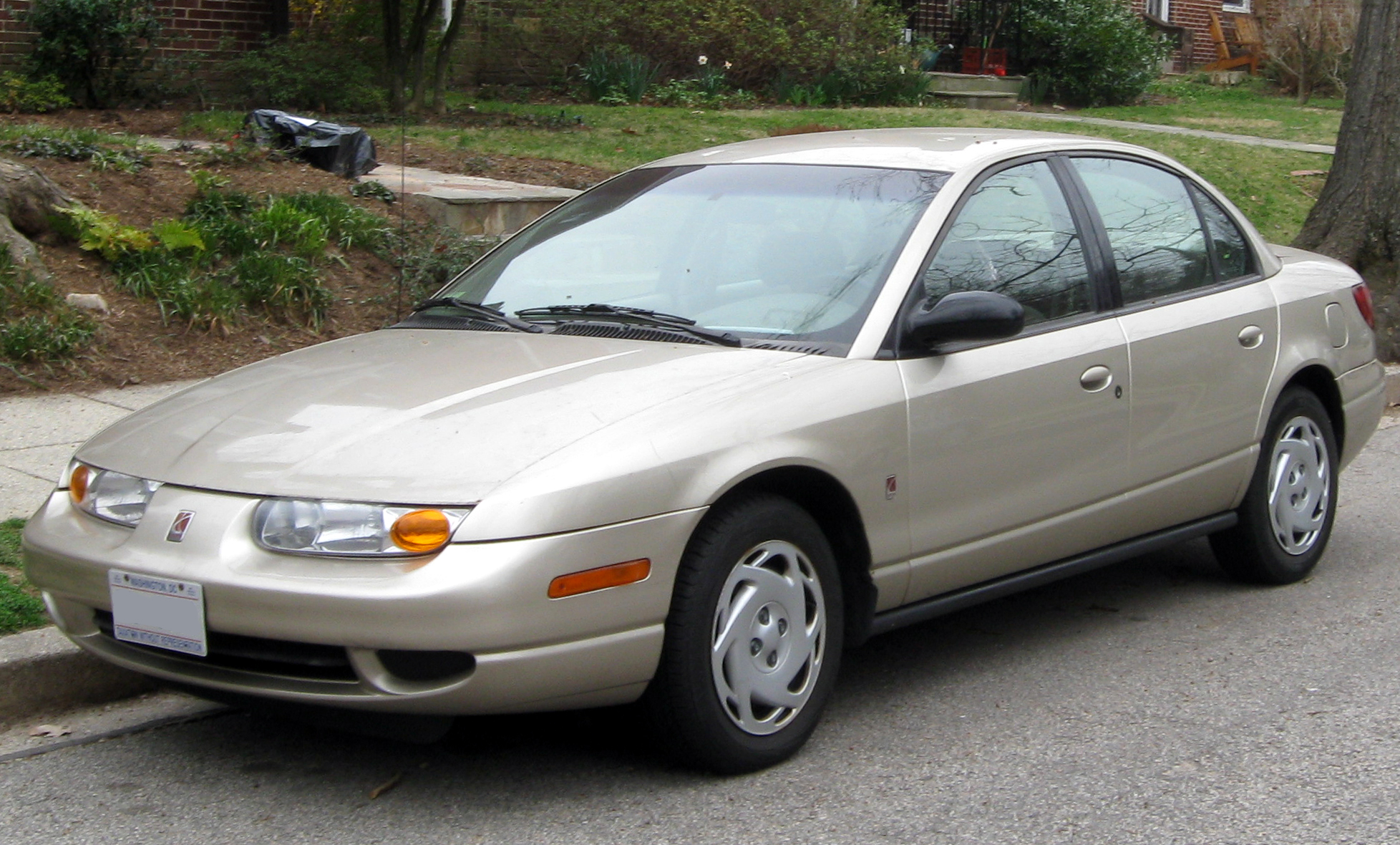

Overview
- Also called: Saturn SL1/SL2; Saturn SW1/SW2; Saturn SC1/SC2
- Production: 2000–2002 (SL); 2000–2001 (SW); 2000–2002 (SC)
- Model years: 2000–2002

Body and chassis
- Body style: 3-door coupe 4-door sedan 5-door station wagon

Powertrain
- Engine: 1.9 L L24 I4; 1.9 L LL0 DOHC I4
- Transmission: 4-speed Saturn MP6 automatic 4-speed Saturn MP7 automatic 5-speed Saturn MP2 manual 5-speed Saturn MP3 manual

Dimensions
- Wheelbase: 102.4 in (2,600 mm)
- Length: 2000–02 SL & SW: 178.1 in (4,524 mm); 2001–02 SC: 180.5 in (4,585 mm)
- Width: 2000–01 SW: 66.4 in (1,687 mm); 2001–02 SC: 68.2 in (1,732 mm); 2000–02 SL: 66.4 in (1,687 mm)
- Height: 2000–01 SW: 55.6 in (1,412 mm); 2000–02 SL: 55 in (1,397 mm); 2001–02 SC: 53 in (1,346 mm)

=== Third generation SL and SW ===
In 1999 for the 2000 model year, the Saturn S-Series was facelifted for the final time before being discontinued in 2002. This resulted in what is typically referred to as the third generation Saturn S-Series. The exterior of the Saturn SL sedans received new body panels from the belt-line down. The rear end of the SL sedans received a redesigned applique on the trunk, and the headlights of the SL sedans had received orange turn signal indicators.

The interior of all the Saturn S-Series models received a completely redesigned dashboard, center console, and steering wheel, but the rest of the interiors were mostly unchanged. The SL2, SW2, and SC2 got the storage compartment with a sliding armrest in the center console as standard, whereas the SL1, SW1, and SC1 did not.

Like the 1999 model year SL sedans and the 1999 model year SW station wagons that were made in late in 1999, the 2000 model year SL sedans and the 2000 model year SW station wagons had also included a digital trip odometer, which did not cause any issues like the analog trip odometers that were used in the 1991-early 1999 model year S-Series vehicles.

The third generation Saturn S-Series was also the first Saturn to use the body control module (BCM), and the powertrain control module (PCM) systems in tandem with each other. In the third generation Saturn S-Series models, the PCM system was used strictly for the vehicle's transmission and engine, whereas the BCM system was used strictly for the vehicle's interior functions such as the digital trip odometer and speedometer.

Beginning with the 2001 model year, side curtain airbags became available as an optional feature. The optional side curtain airbags were only available on the 2001 to 2002 model Saturn SL1 and SL2 sedans. A rear spoiler and a sunroof were available options.

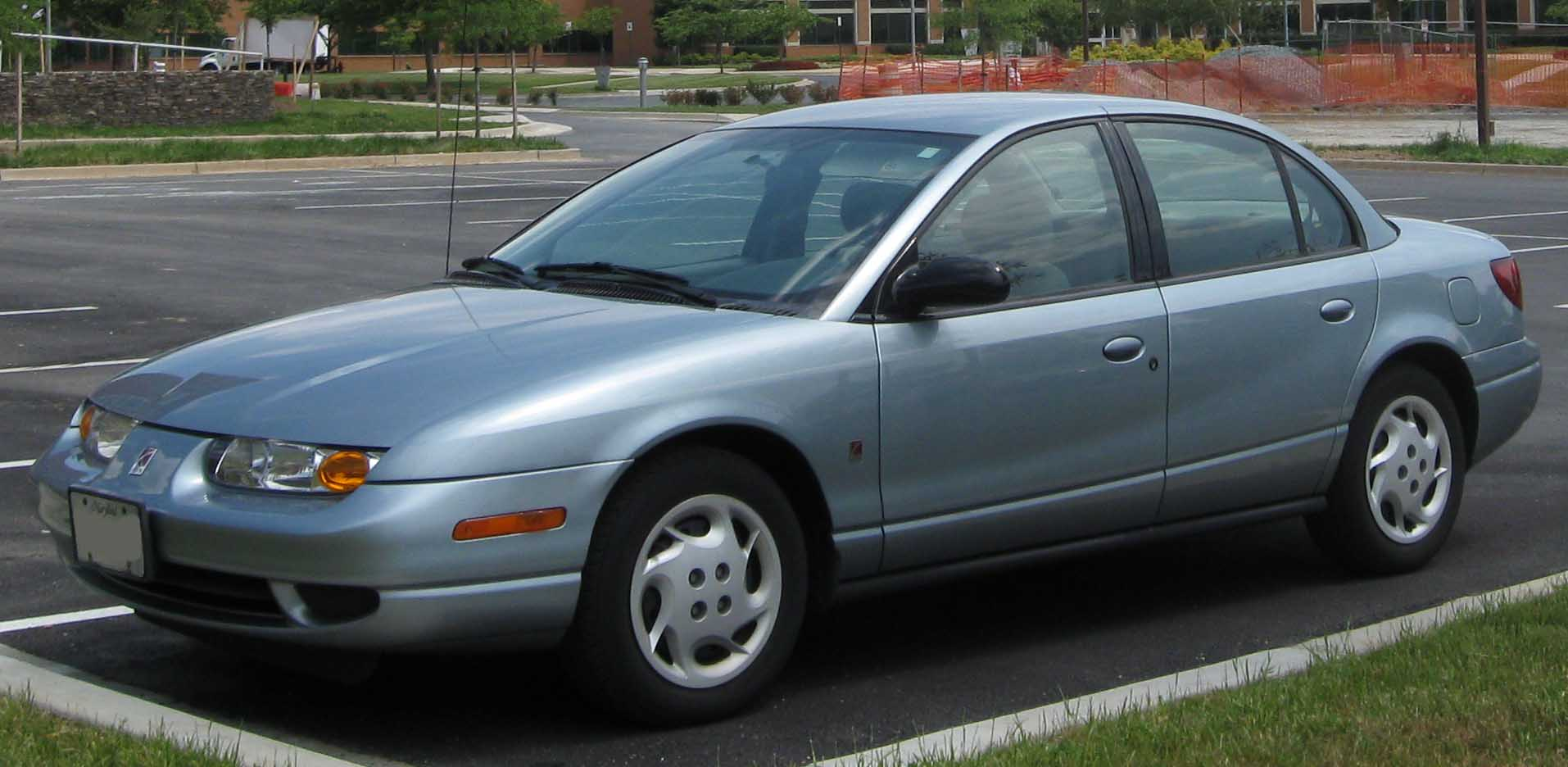
2000–2002 Saturn SL

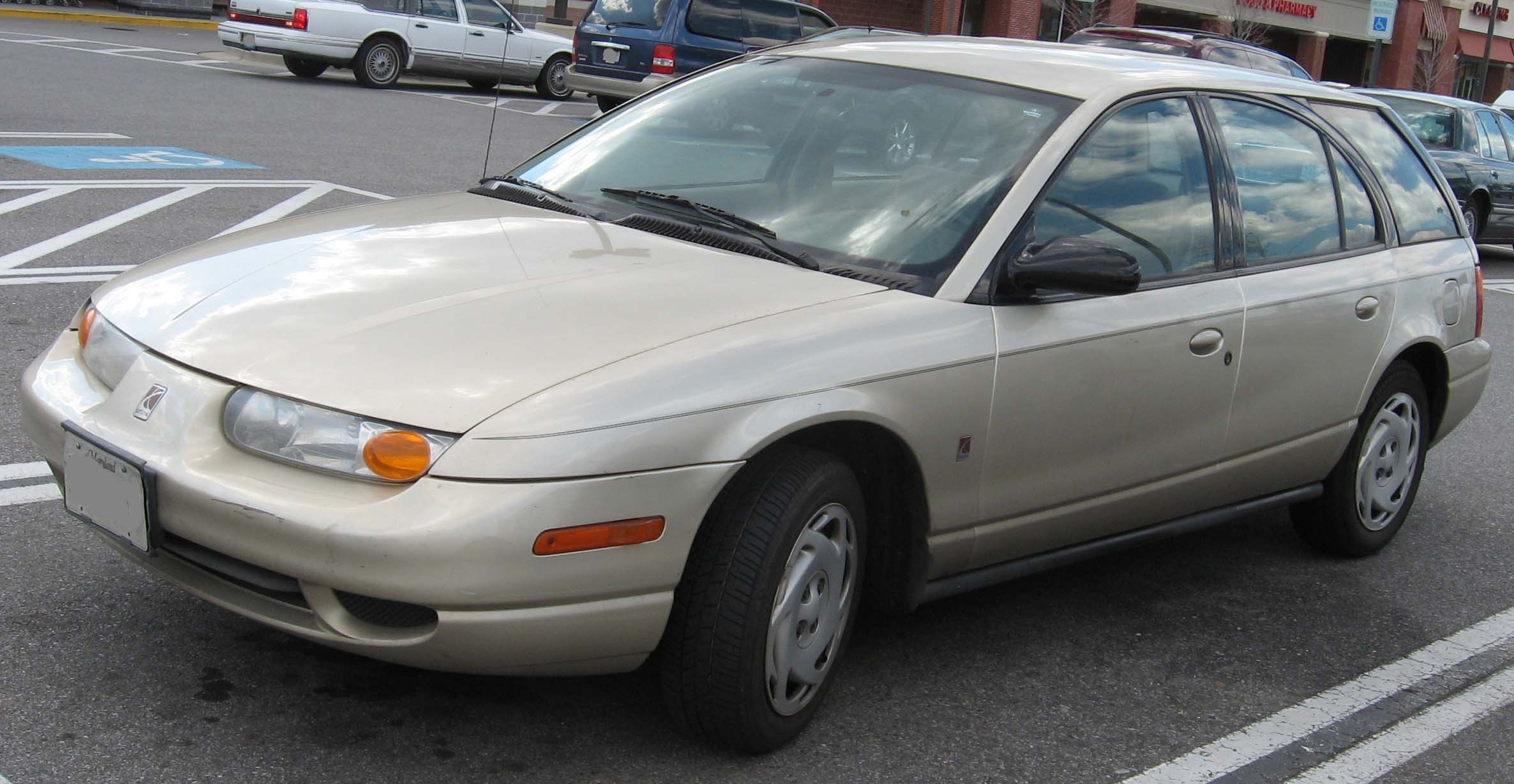
2000–2001 Saturn SW2

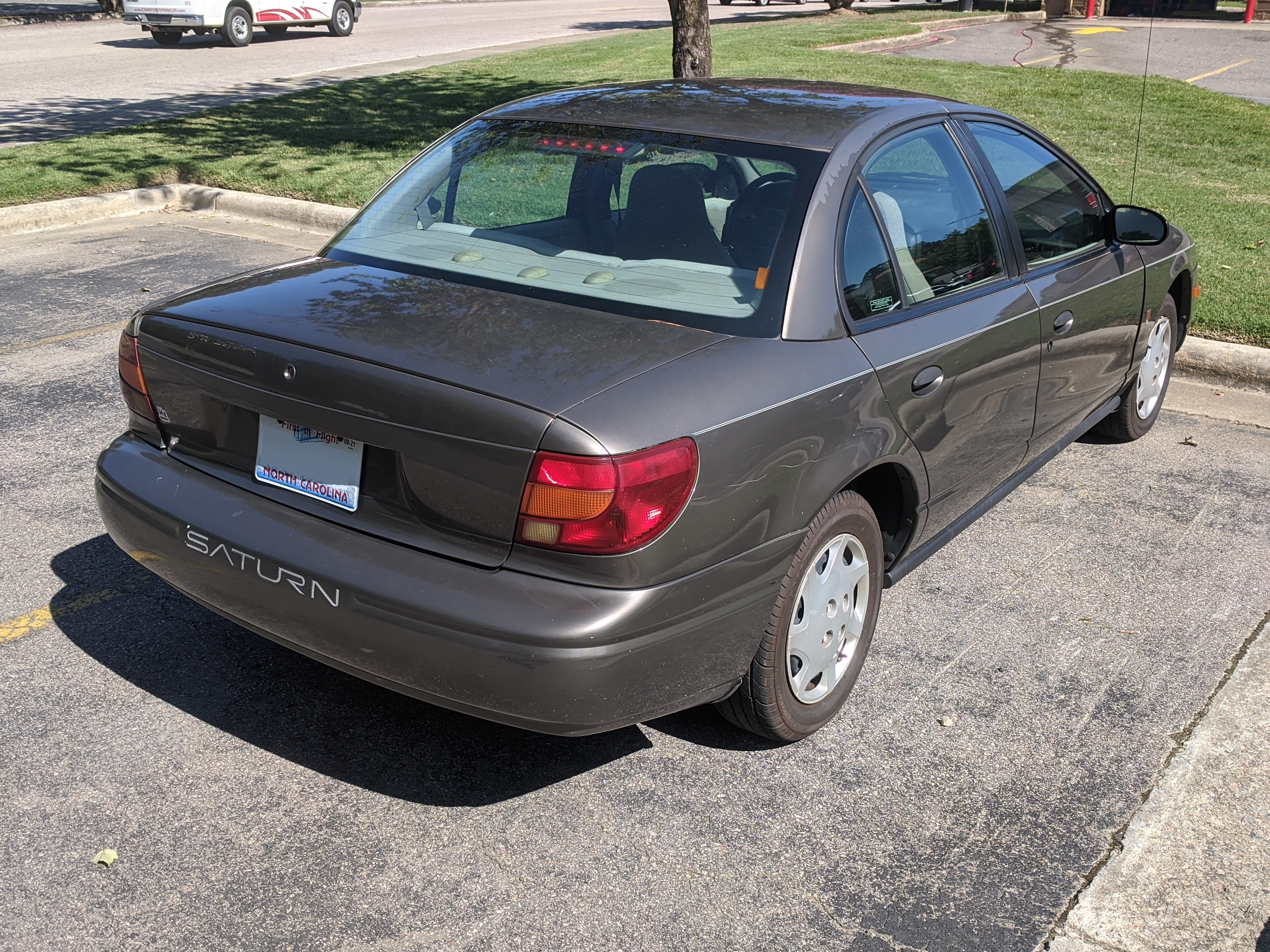
2000-2002 SL1 rear. The SL1 has unpainted door handles

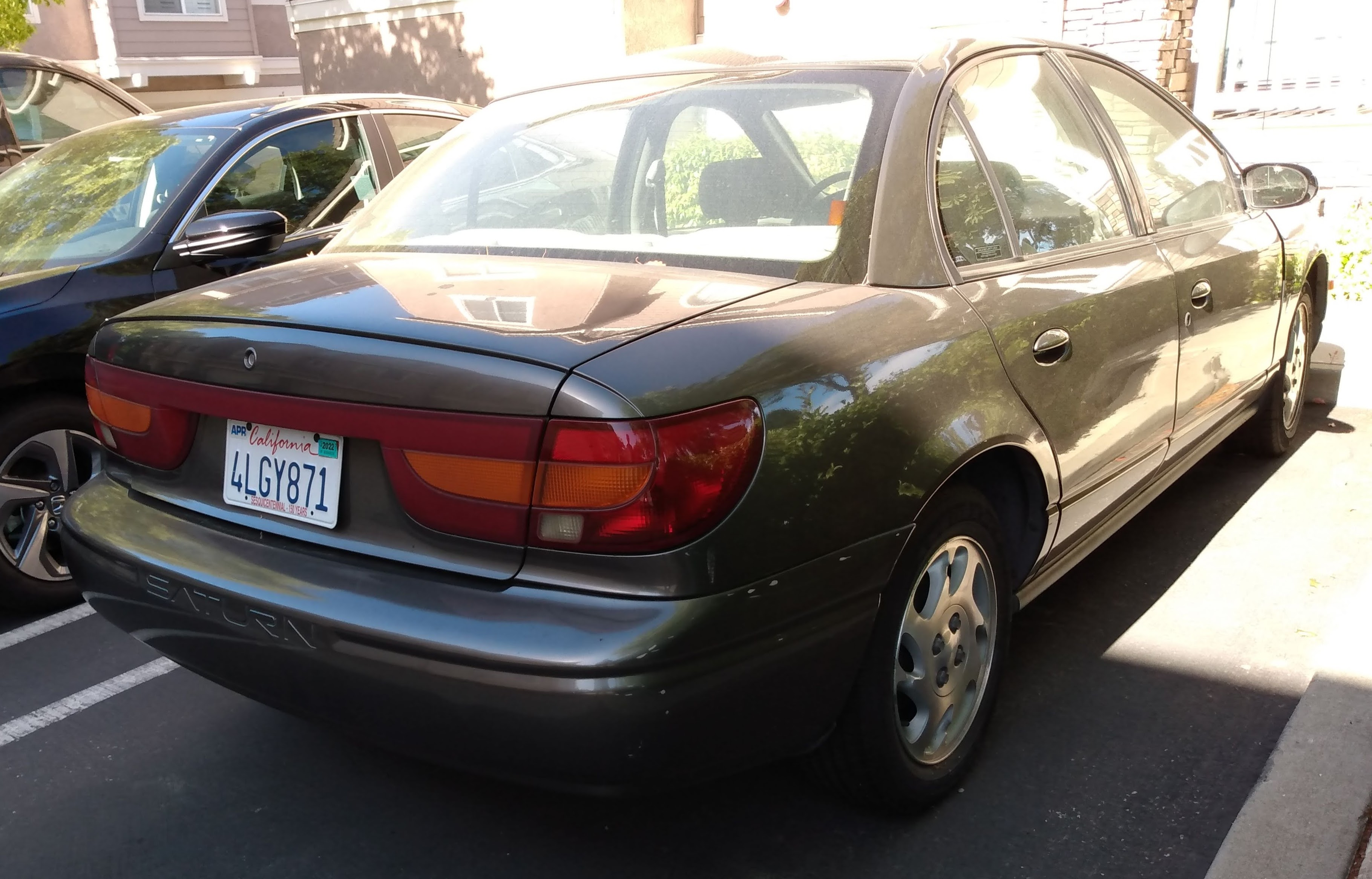
2000-2002 SL2 rear. SL2s feature a full light bar on the trunk lid

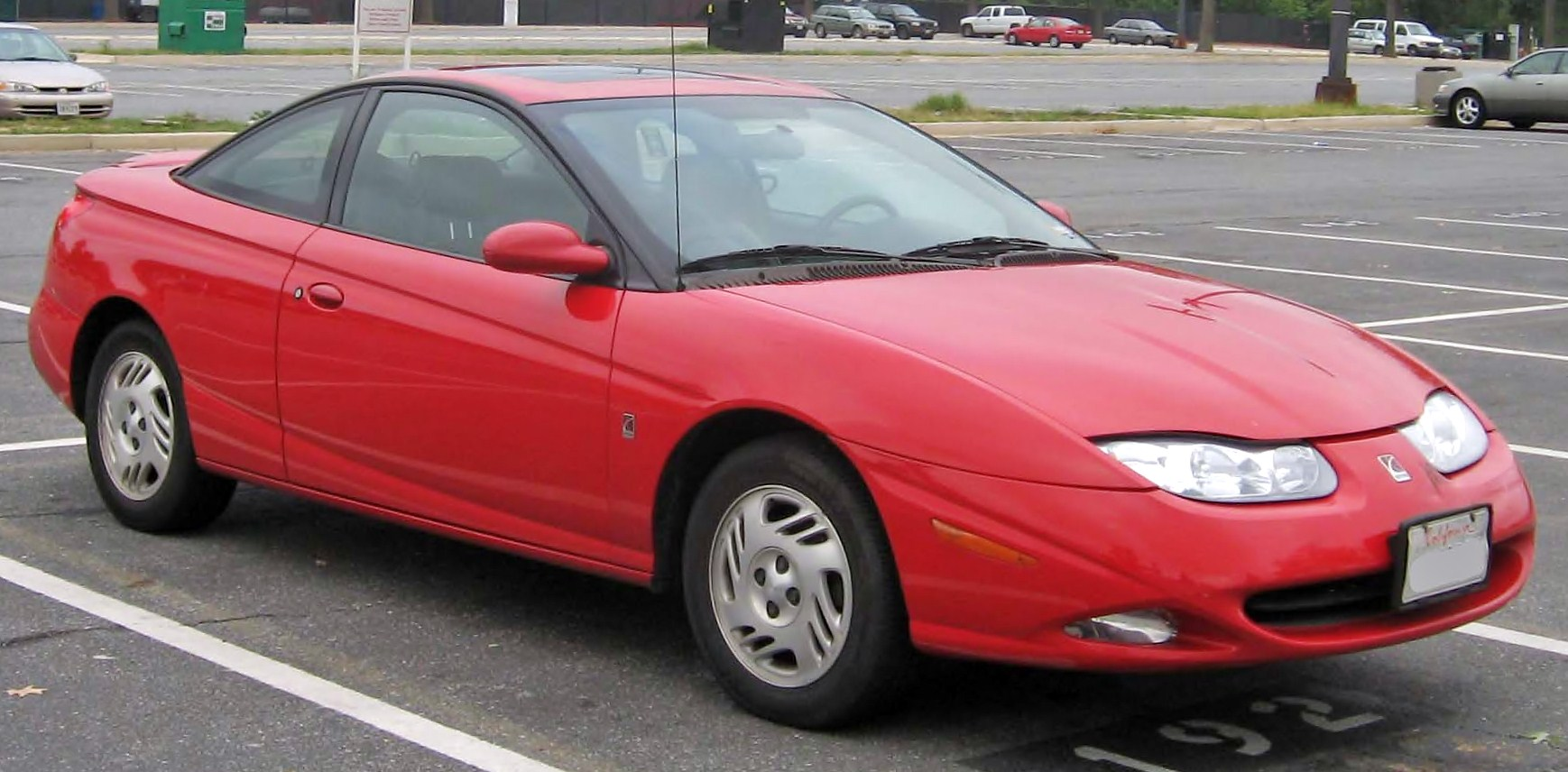
2001–2002 Saturn SC

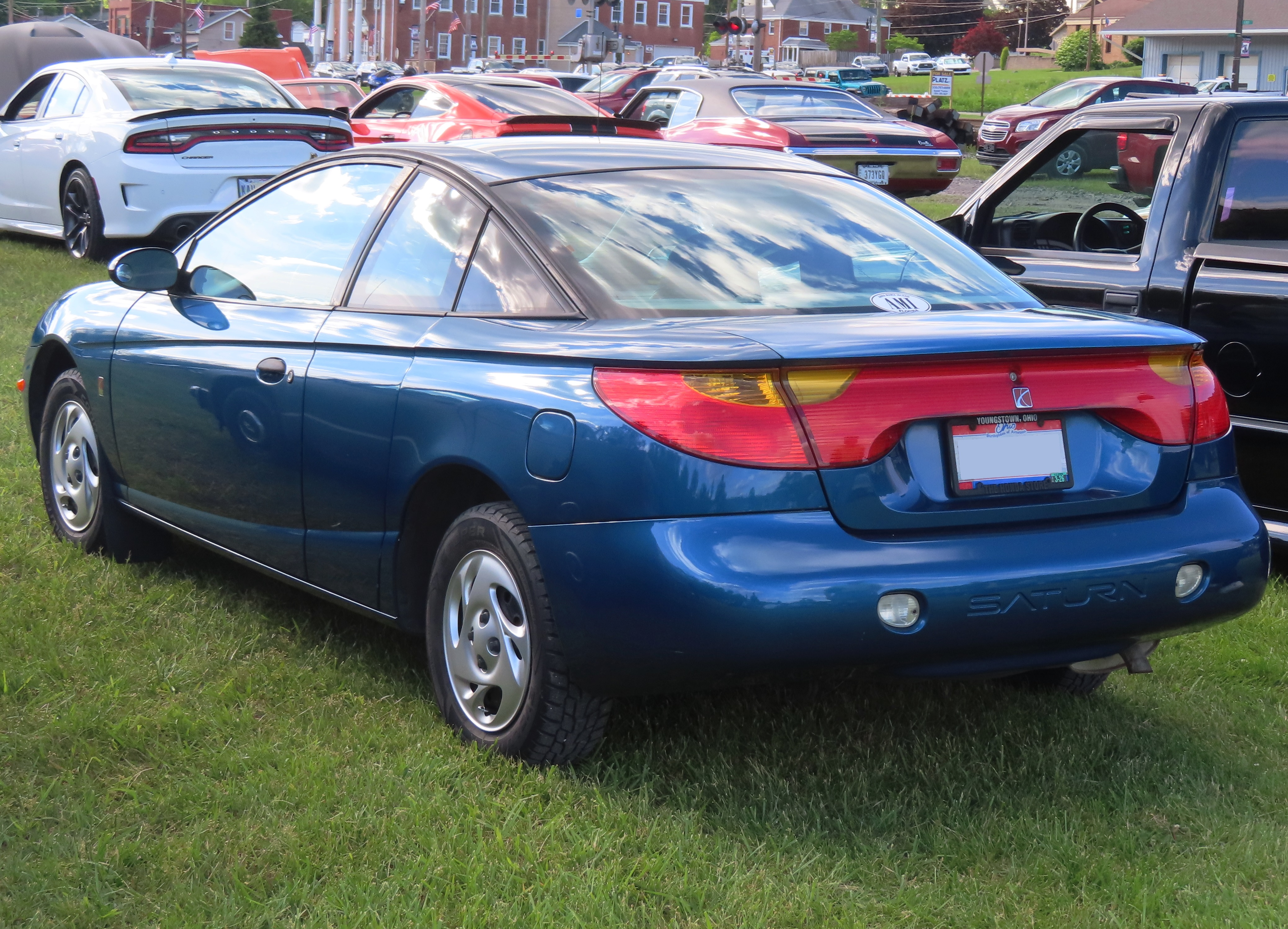
2001-2002 SC1 rear

=== Third generation SC ===
The third generation of Saturn SC continued to be available in SC1 and SC2 models. It was facelifted with redesigned fascias front and rear, as well as new headlamps and tail lamps for the 2001 model year. The front fenders and door panels were also changed, continuing the character line all the way down to the fog light beneath the front bumper. A body control module (BCM) and powertrain control module (PCM) were added in 2000, near the end of the second generation run. A new GT trim package had become available for the Saturn SC coupes for the 2001 model year, along with the option of American Racing Wheels that was only available on the GT version of the Saturn SC coupes. A rear spoiler on the vehicle's rear trunk lid was also made available for the 2001 to 2002 model year Saturn SC GT coupes.

== Special edition Saturns ==
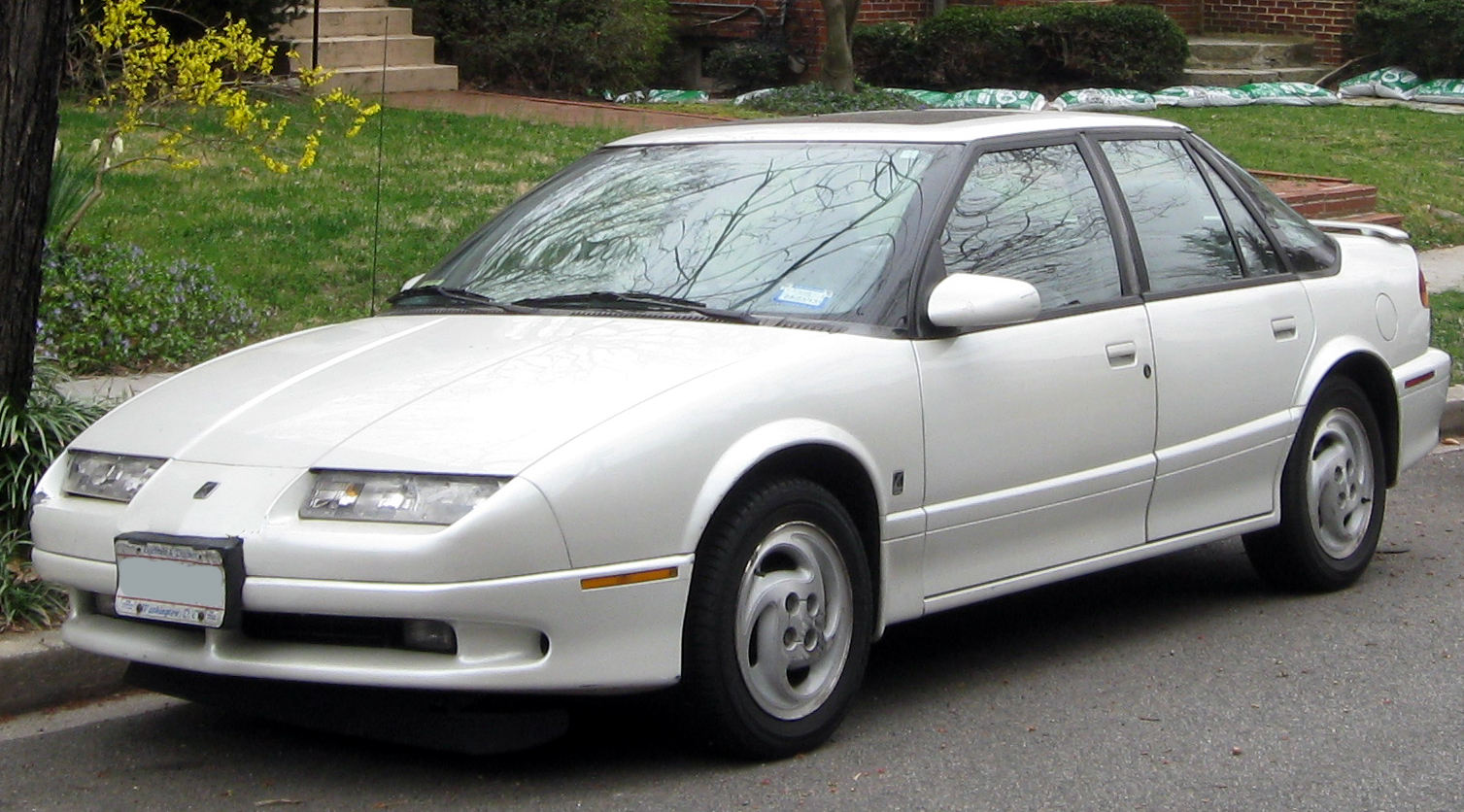
1994 SL2 Homecoming Edition

A special Homecoming edition of the SL2 was released for 1994. It had special Pearl White paint (a "silver-tint" pearl, shared with Cadillac models of this year), black Saturn emblems, spoiler, 15-inch "teardrop" wheels, anti-lock four-wheel disc brakes, grey leather/cloth interior, rear headrests, fog lamps, and power locks and windows. Options included a sunroof, CD player, and the 4-speed automatic with traction control.

In 1998 and 1999, prospective buyers of a red or white SC2 had the option of purchasing the "Black Top Coupe Package". The models were referred to as the "Red Hot Coupe" or "White Hot Coupe", based on the exterior color. The package came with a black roof panel, black outside rearview mirrors, black emblems, white face gauges and black accented teardrop wheels. These are extremely rare.

In 1999, a second Homecoming Edition was produced in a special "Mint Color" with tan leather interior, special off-white gauge faceplates, and black Saturn badges to commemorate the second "Homecoming" visit to the Spring Hill, Tennessee manufacturing facility. The 1999 Homecoming Edition also had the same features offered as the 1994 Homecoming Edition.

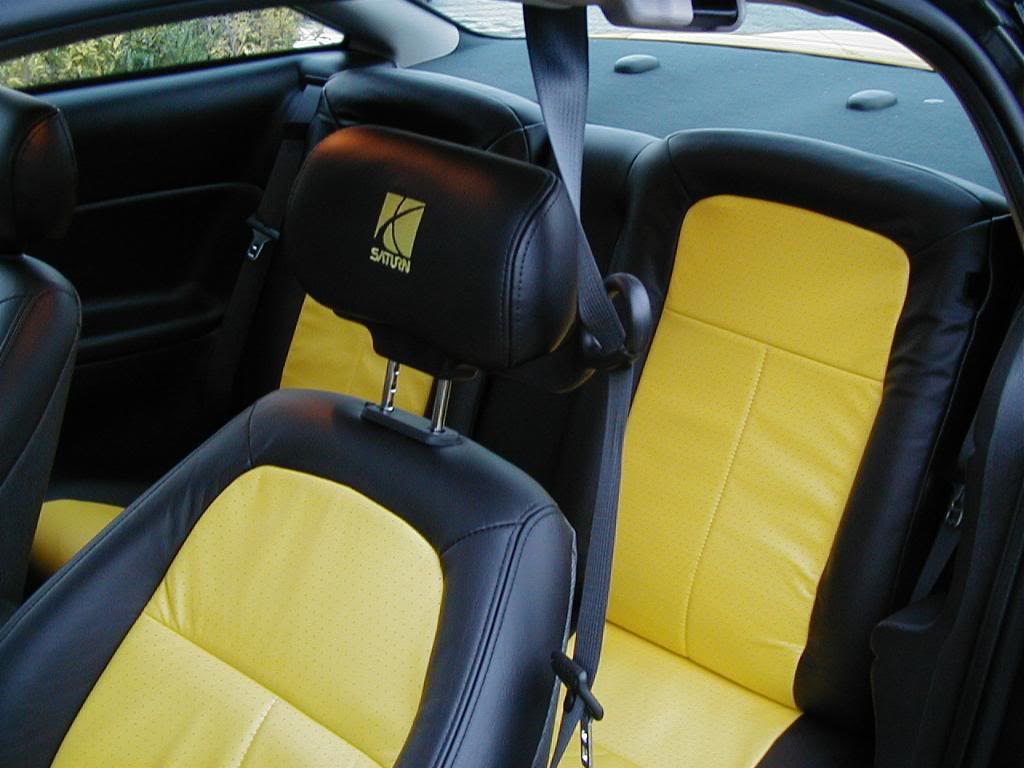
The interior of a Saturn Limited Edition SC2.

In 2001, a special yellow SC2 coupé model was also built. The model was officially named "Limited Edition", but soon became known as the "Bumblebee Edition". 99 were produced, each with a certificate of authenticity. The "Bumblebee Edition" included embroidered headrests, black leather interior with yellow leather inserts on the seats and door panels, black roof and mirrors, number designation inside the fuel filler door, and a certificate of authenticity. These are not to be confused with the regular issue Yellow Sport Coupe.

For the 2001 model year only, a special edition of the Saturn SL2 sedan that was called the Saturn SL2 10th Anniversary Edition (also known as the Silver Anniversary Edition) was made available. The Saturn SL2 10th Anniversary Edition had included several upscale features that were not available on any other Saturn S-Series vehicles like power windows, leather interior, standard side curtain airbags, and several other upscale features. The Saturn SL2 10th Anniversary Edition also had "Saturn 10th Anniversary" stitched onto the front seat adjustable leather headrests. The Saturn SL2 10th Anniversary Edition had also featured a rear spoiler on the vehicle's rear trunk lid.

Special Edition Production Numbers
1994 Homecoming Edition	3,500
1998 White Hot Coupe	213
1998 Red Hot Coupe	657
1999 White Hot Coupe	285
1999 Red Hot Coupe	284
1999 Homecoming Edition	4,000
2001 Limited Edition SC2	99
2001 10th Anniversary Edition	1,000
2001 Bright Red	664

== Theft ==
The 1995 Saturn SL was the most stolen vehicle in 2003, while the 1994 SL took third place in CCC Information Services's 2003 most stolen vehicle report. According to Locksmith Ledger, prior to the middle of the 1995 model year (dubbed "1995-1/2"), GM had not yet rolled out the Passlock system, meaning a filed blank key can be used to open the door and start the engine.

== Racing ==
Saturn SCs competed in the SCCA World Challenge in the 1990s, winning several races from 1995 to 1997. Several S-Series cars have been used as rally and autocross race cars.

== Safety ==
=== Insurance Institute for Highway Safety (IIHS) ===
1995–2002 SL IIHS scores
Moderate overlap frontal offset	Acceptable
Small overlap frontal offset	Not Tested
Side impact	Not Tested
Roof strength	Not Tested

=== NHTSA ===
1991–2002 SL NHTSA scores
Year	Frontal Driver	Frontal Passenger	Side Driver	Side Passenger	4x2 Rollover
1991	3/5 stars	3/5 stars	Not Rated	Not Rated	Not Rated
1992	4/5 stars	3/5 stars	Not Rated	Not Rated	Not Rated
1993	4/5 stars	3/5 stars	Not Rated	Not Rated	Not Rated
1994	4/5 stars	3/5 stars	Not Rated	Not Rated	Not Rated
1995	4/5 stars	4/5 stars	Not Rated	Not Rated	Not Rated
1996	4/5 stars	4/5 stars	Not Rated	Not Rated	Not Rated
1997	4/5 stars	4/5 stars	3/5 stars	3/5 stars	Not Rated
1998	5/5 stars	4/5 stars	3/5 stars	3/5 stars	Not Rated
1999	5/5 stars	5/5 stars	3/5 stars	3/5 stars	Not Rated
2000	5/5 stars	5/5 stars	3/5 stars	2/5 stars	Not Rated
2001	5/5 stars	5/5 stars	3/5 stars	2/5 stars	4/5 stars
2002	5/5 stars	5/5 stars	3/5 stars	2/5 stars	4/5 stars

== Production numbers ==
Listed below is a rough estimate on the numbers of S-Series produced from 1990 to 2002.

Year	Coupe				Sedan				Wagon			Total
	SC	SC1	SC2	Total	SL	SL1	SL2	Total	SW1	SW2	Total	
1991	~10,000	-	-	~20,000				~38,629	-	-	-	~48,629
1992		-	-						-	-	-	169,959
1993	-											244,621
1994	-											267,518
1995	-			62,434				221,102			19,452	302,988
1996	-											294,198
1997	-			70,711				213,182			31,099	314,992
1998	-			38,591				160,759			20,415	219,765
1999	-			52,965				203,578			19,090	275,633
2000	-	8,517	8,724	17,241			68,907	142,992			9,633	169,866
2001	-	23,584	17,414	40,998				73,428			3,416	117,842
2002	-								-	-	-	
