= Saturn MP transmission =

The Saturn MP Transmission were a series of 5-speed manual and 4-speed automatic transmissions that were manufactured by Saturn Corporation exclusively for the S-Series. They were designed for transverse engine applications and was deployed in vehicles that output up to 122 ft·lbf of engine torque.

== Manual Transmissions ==
=== MP2 ===
Gear ratios

Years	1	2	3	4	5	R	Final Gear
1991-1993	3.077	1.810	1.207	0.861	0.643	2.923	4.063
1993-1994	3.250	1.810	1.207	0.861	0.643	2.923	4.063
1995-2002	3.250	1.950	1.172	0.811	0.605	2.923	4.063

Applications

- 1991–2002 Saturn SC1, SL, SL1, SW, SW1

=== MP3 ===
Gear ratios

Years	1	2	3	4	5	R	Final Gear
1991-1994	3.250	2.056	1.423	1.033	0.730	2.923	4.063
1995-2002	3.250	1.950	1.423	1.033	0.730	2.923	4.063

Applications

- 1991–2002 Saturn SC, SC2, SL2, SW2

== Automatic Transmissions ==
=== MP6 ===
Gear ratios

Years	1	2	3	4	Final Gear
1991-1993	2.240	1.170	0.810	0.600	4.133
1993-1997	2.530	1.170	0.810	0.600	4.133
1998-2002	2.530	1.560	0.810	0.600	4.063

Applications

- 1991–2002 Saturn SC1, SL1, SW1

=== MP7 ===
Gear ratios

Years	1	2	3	4	Final Gear
1991-1997	2.530	1.560	1.030	0.700	4.133
1998-2002	2.530	1.560	1.030	0.700	4.063

Applications

- 1991–2002 Saturn SC, SC2, SL2, SW2

== Sources ==
- "S-Series Transmissions". saturnseries.net.
