= Saturn I4 engine =

Saturn engine
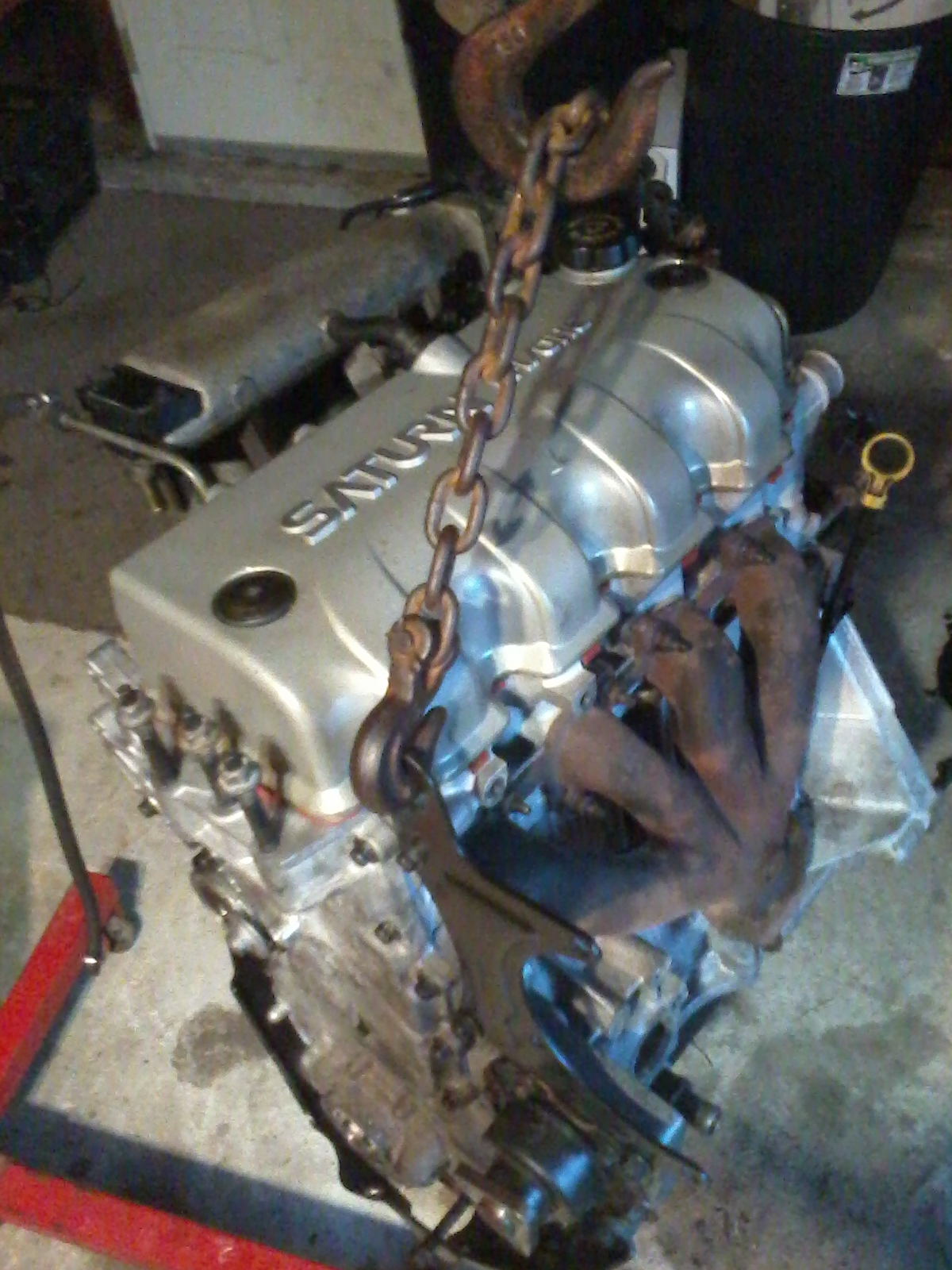

Overview
- Manufacturer: Saturn Corporation
- Also called: Single Cam; Twin Cam

Layout
- Configuration: Straight-4
- Displacement: 1.9 L; 116.0 cu in (1,901 cc)
- Cylinder bore: 82 mm (3.23 in)
- Piston stroke: 90 mm (3.54 in)
- Cylinder block material: Aluminum
- Cylinder head material: Aluminum
- Valvetrain: SOHC 2 valves x cyl.; DOHC 4 valves x cyl.
- Compression ratio: SOHC: 9.3:1; DOHC: 9.5:1

Combustion
- Fuel system: Throttle-body fuel injection; Sequential MPFI
- Fuel type: Gasoline
- Oil system: Wet sump
- Cooling system: Water-cooled

Output
- Power output: LK0: 85 hp (63 kW); L24: 100 hp (75 kW); LL0: 124 hp (92 kW)
- Specific power: LK0: 44.7 hp (33.3 kW)/L; L24: 52.6 hp (39.2 kW)/L; LL0: 65.2 hp (48.6 kW)/L
- Torque output: LK0: 107 lb⋅ft (145 N⋅m); L24: 115 lb⋅ft (156 N⋅m); LL0: 122 lb⋅ft (165 N⋅m)

Dimensions
- Dry weight: SOHC: 196.74 lb (89.24 kg); DOHC: 220.22 lb (99.89 kg)

Chronology
- Successor: Ecotec engine (de facto)

The powerplant used in Saturn S-Series automobiles was a straight-4 aluminum piston engine produced by Saturn, a subsidiary of General Motors. The engine was only used in the Saturn S-series line of vehicles (SL, SC, SW) from 1991 through 2002. It was available in chain-driven SOHC or DOHC variants.

This was an innovative engine for the time using the lost foam casting process for the engine block and cylinder head. Saturn was one of the first to use this casting process in a full-scale high-production environment. Both engine types used the same engine block.

== Engine block ==
The engine utilized a water-cooled aluminum block. The main bearing caps were made of ductile iron and held in place with two bolts each. The cylinder block bores had interference fit cast iron liners for the piston rings to sit against. The engine block was made from 319.1 aluminum alloy and the liners were made from grey iron.

=== Crankshaft ===
The crankshaft was supported by five main bearings with thrust taken at the middle bearing. 1991 and 1992 engines had a different crankshaft from 1993 and later engines, whose crankshafts had reluctor ring slots advanced ten degrees for easier starting. 1991 to 1998 crankshafts incorporated four counterweights, while those from 1999 to 2002 incorporated eight.

=== Connecting rods and pistons ===
From 1991 to 1998 the connecting rods were forged steel with standard type crank pin bearings. SOHC engines during that period used a dished piston design whereas the twin cam engines used a flat top piston with 2 recesses for the intake valves. Twin cam pistons received several re-designs throughout the production run aimed at reducing oil consumption issues. These included reducing the clearance between the top of the piston and the first compression ring, redesigning the skirts on the pistons and the oiling ports on the bottom of the pistons. For the 1999 model year all pistons were totally redesigned. Both engines used the flat top pistons with 2 valve recesses and featured a new hypereutectic design with coated skirts. Also for 1999 all connecting rods switched to a slightly longer powder forged design and cracked bearing caps. The piston pins floated in the connecting rod bushings. The pistons were cast aluminum alloy with the piston pins being retained with snap rings.

=== Timing chain ===
The timing chain was hydraulic tensioned and had a ratchet mechanism to keep the chain tight. The timing chain rode on one pivoting chain guide resting on the ratchet tensioner and one fixed guide attached to the engine block and cylinder head. The 1991 to 1998 DOHC engine had an upper timing chain guide in between the camshaft sprockets. The timing chain was lubricated via cast-off from the top of the cylinder head and one 'squirter' on the oil pump housing. The SOHC, 1991-1998 DOHC, and 1999-2002 DOHC engines all used different timing chain sets.

== SOHC LK0/L24 ==
The SOHC (LK0/L24) cylinder head had 8 valves and was made of lost foam cast aluminum. The camshaft was located in the center of the cylinder head and driven by a chain off the front crankshaft sprocket. Motion from the camshaft was transmitted to the eight valves by the hydraulic lifters and rocker arms.

The SOHC engine was used in the base model S-series vehicles (SC1, SL, SL1, SW1)

The LK0 engine first used TBI (Throttle Body Injection) for fuel delivery and was rated at 85 hp (63 kW) at 5000 rpm and 107 lb⋅ft (145 N⋅m) at 2400 rpm from 1991 to 1994.

The L24 engine received MPFI (Multi-Port Fuel Injection) in 1995 which increased power output to 100 hp (75 kW) at 5000 rpm and 115 lb⋅ft (156 N⋅m) at 2400 rpm. In 1999, these engines switched from the recessed top pistons of the previous models to all new flat top pistons that were also used in the twin cam models. The cylinder head was also redesigned to keep the compression ratio at 8.8:1 even with the flat top pistons and now featured provisions for an air injection reaction system. This engine was used from 1995 to 2002.

Some 1992 through 1998 L24 cylinder heads developed cracks in the fifth camshaft journal, located closest to #4 cylinder. The hairline crack would form between the oil feed port of that journal and the coolant passages in the cylinder head. Symptoms would range from overheating to low coolant, however, most cars affected by this issue exhibited oil migration into the cooling system. The resulting mixture of the two fluids would result in a thick brown "milkshake"-like mixture, visible in the coolant overflow tank.

Saturn released unadvertised policy which would cover this issue, extending the warranty on the cylinder head to 6 years or 100,000 miles (160,000 km). Repair required the replacement of the cylinder head. and flushing of the coolant system. Badly affected cars would see coolant in the oil, as well as oil in the coolant, and would require the replacement of the complete engine assembly. Until the cylinder head casting was redesigned some time in 1998, some vehicles would require this repair more than once, and replacement cylinder heads could develop the same crack.

It was estimated that between 2% and 5% of SOHC Saturn S-Series vehicles were affected by this defect. DOHC engines had a different cylinder head, and did not suffer the same issue.

== DOHC LL0 ==
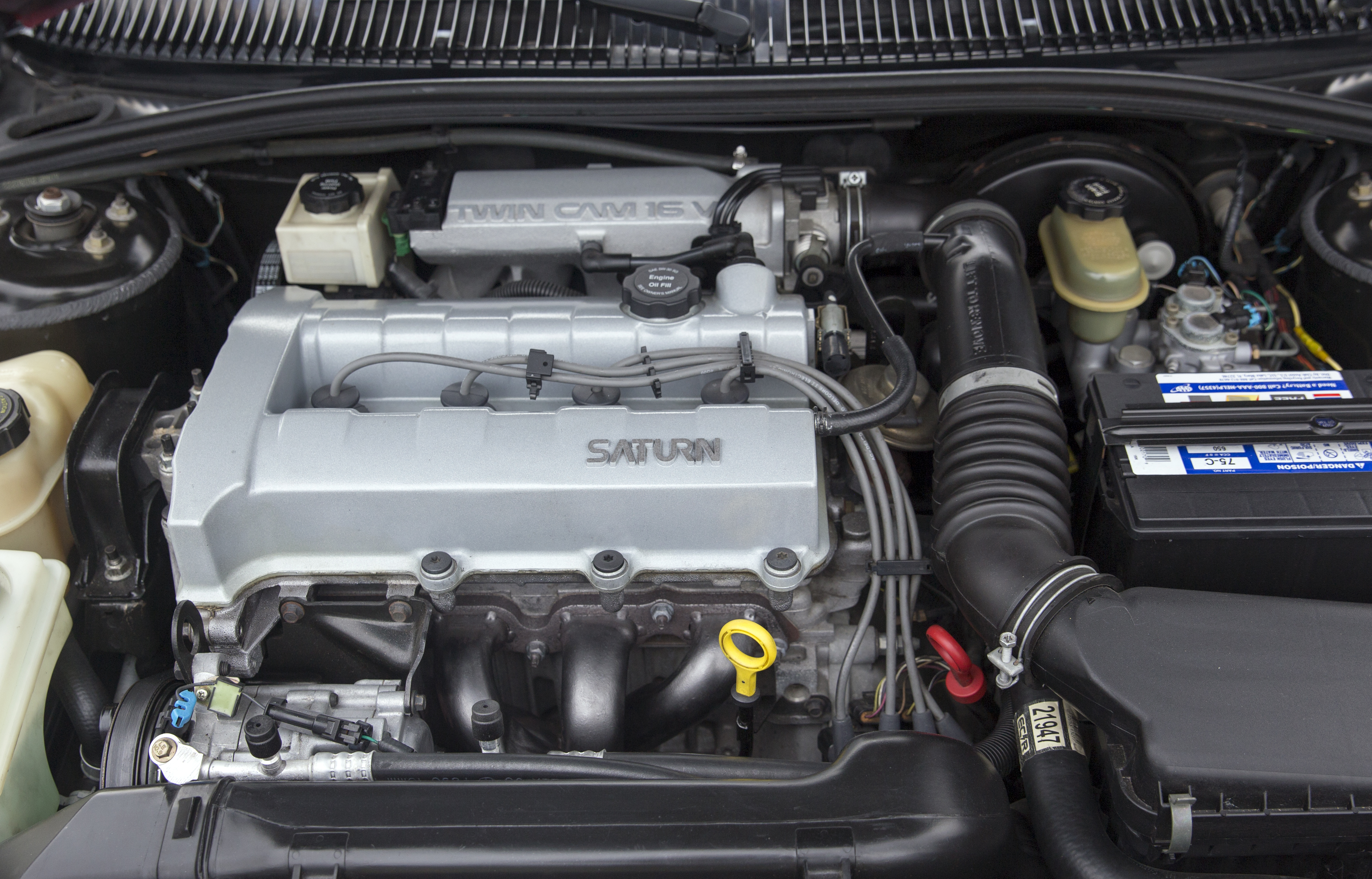
The Twin Cam LL0 engine in a 1992 SC

The 1991-1998 DOHC cylinder head had 16 valves and was made of lost foam cast aluminium. The camshafts were held in the cylinder head with bearing caps and driven by a chain off the front crankshaft sprocket. Motion from the camshafts was transmitted to the 16 valves by direct-acting hydraulic lifters.

LL0 cylinder heads were changed slightly in 1995, when Saturn adopted electronic, linear EGR mechanisms, over the previous vacuum actuated design. The head casting was changed to accommodate different mounting surface of the new valve. (1994 CA emissions engines used an adapter to mount the LEGR valve.)

A new LL0 cylinder head appeared in 1999 using a roller camshaft with hydraulic lifters and rocker arms, but power was unchanged. Also for 1999 provisions for a new air injection reaction system was introduced aimed at improving engine emissions.

All LL0 engines used MPFI and were rated at 124 hp (92 kW) at 6000 rpm and 122 lb⋅ft (165 N⋅m) at 4800 rpm. The DOHC engine was used in the upper-level model S-series vehicles (SC, SC2, SL2, SW2).

== Gallery ==
LK0/L24 head

Crankshafts

1991-1998 connecting rod
