= Buick Skylark =

Series of passenger automobiles produced by Buick

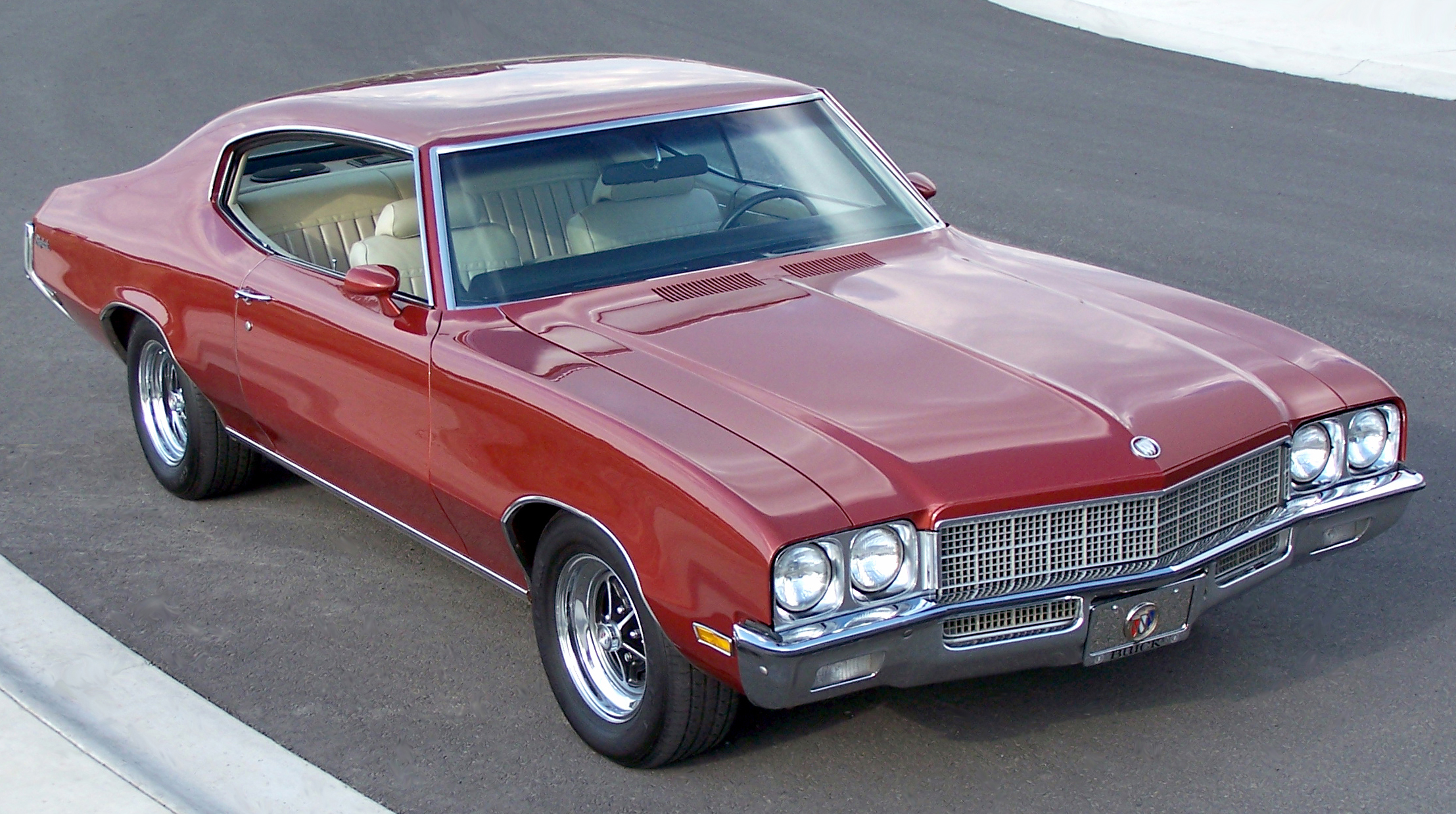
- 1972 Buick Skylark

Overview
- Manufacturer: Buick (General Motors)
- Model years: 1953–1954; 1961–1972; 1975–1998

Body and chassis
- Layout: FR layout (1953–1979); Transverse front-engine, front-wheel drive (1980–1998)

Chronology
- Successor: Buick Century (1973); Buick Verano (2012)

The Buick Skylark is a passenger car formerly produced by Buick. The model was made in six production runs, during 46 years, over which the car's design varied dramatically due to changing technology, tastes, and new standards implemented over the years. It was named for the species of bird called skylark.

The Skylark name first appeared on a limited production luxury convertible using the Buick Roadmaster's chassis for two years, then was reintroduced in 1961 as a higher luxury content alternative to the entry-level Buick Special on which the Skylark was based. It was then positioned as Buick's luxury performance model when the Buick GSX was offered. As GM began downsizing during the late 1970s, the Skylark became the entry-level model when the Special nameplate was used as a trim package designation, then in the 1980s was offered as a front-wheel-drive vehicle where it was both a coupe and sedan for three different generations.

== 1953–1954 ==
Roadmaster Skylark
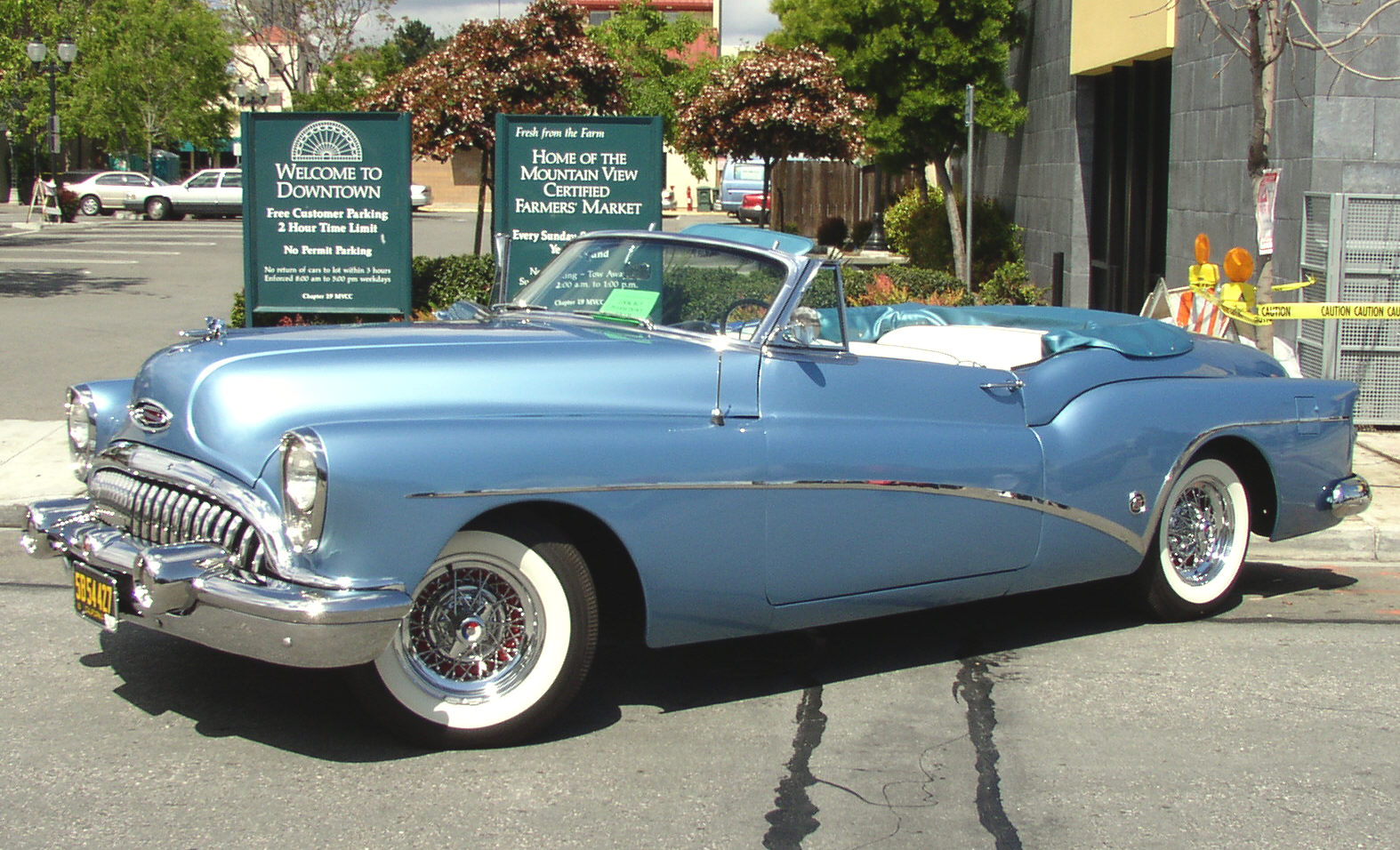
- 1953 Buick Roadmaster Skylark

Overview
- Assembly: United States: Flint, Michigan (Buick City)

Body and chassis
- Body style: 2-door convertible
- Layout: FR layout
- Platform: C-body
- Related: Oldsmobile 98 Fiesta; Cadillac Series 62 Eldorado

Powertrain
- Engine: 322 cu in (5.3 L) Fireball V8

Dimensions
- Wheelbase: 121.5 in (3,086 mm)
- Length: 207.6 in (5,273 mm)
- Width: 79.9 in (2,029 mm)
- Height: 58.9 in (1,496 mm)
- Curb weight: 4,395 lb (1,994 kg)

Created to mark Buick's 50th anniversary, the Roadmaster Skylark joined the Oldsmobile 98 Fiesta and Cadillac Series 62 Eldorado as top-of-the-line, limited-production specialty convertibles introduced in 1953 by General Motors to promote its design leadership. Of the three, the Skylark's run of 1,690 units proved the most successful, and a sales feat considering the car's 1953 list price of slightly in excess of US$5,000 ($60,168 in 2025 dollars) was over 50% more than the US$3,200 Roadmaster convertible on which it was based ($38,507 in 2025 dollars). It was comparable in price to the 1953 Packard Caribbean with a similar retail price.

Production ran for two years. Based on the model 76R two-door Roadmaster convertible, the 1953 Skylark (designated model 76X) had identical dimensions (except height), almost identical appearance, shared its drive train, and had all its standard equipment, plus its few remaining options, including power windows, power brakes, full carpeting, and a "Selectronic" AM radio. Only air conditioning was not offered, unnecessary in either convertible.

Importantly, the new Skylark featured Buick's new 322 in^{3} (5.3 L) Fireball V8 in place of the automaker's longstanding straight 8, and a 12-volt electrical system, both division firsts. It debuted full-cutout wheel openings, a styling cue that spread to the main 1954 Buick line. Accenting its lowered, notched beltline was a new "Sweepspear" running almost the entire length of the vehicle, a styling cue that was to appear in various forms on many Buick models over the years.

The 1953 Skylark was handmade in many respects. Only stampings for the hood, trunk lid, and a portion of the convertible tub were shared with the Roadmaster and Super convertibles. All Skylark tubs were finished with various amounts of lead filler. The inner doors were made by cutting the 2-door Roadmaster's in two then welding the pieces back together at an angle to produce the rakish door dip. An overall more streamlined look was reinforced by cutting the windshield almost 3 inches (7.6 cm) shorter and lowering the side windows and convertible top frame proportionately. Seat frames and steering column were then dropped to provide proper headroom and driving position. Front legroom was 44.7 inches (114 cm). Authentic wire wheels were produced by Kelsey-Hayes, chromed everywhere except the plated and painted "Skylark" center emblem.

The Skylark returned in 1954 with radically restyled styling unique to the Buick line, which included wheel cutouts that could be painted in a contrasting color to the body's. The trunk was sloped into a semi-barrel, and tail lights moved to large chromed fins projecting atop the rear fenders.

Re-designated Buick Skylark Model 100, the car was based on the all-new shorter Century/Special series 40 chassis and not the larger series 60 Roadmaster/Super chassis, also all-new for 1954. Once again, all Skylarks were built as 2-door convertibles and carried the same luxury equipment as before, but front leg room dropped 2.4 inches (6.1 cm). While smaller and lighter, the Skylark received a performance boost by retaining the big Buicks' powertrain, an evolutionary improvement of 1953's with the highest output in the division's lineup.

The 1954 Skylark once again had unique sheet metal stampings for its elongated wheel cutouts and new semi-barrel trunk, though fabrication was done without hand labor. The hood ornament was unique, adopted the following year across the Buick product line.

Sales proved to be poor, reflecting the Skylark's continued high price of US$4,843 ($58,062 in 2025 dollars) coupled with a perceived step-down from the Roadmaster/Super series using the Century's chassis, slumping far enough to cause the model's cancellation at the end of the 1954 model year, with only 836 being manufactured.

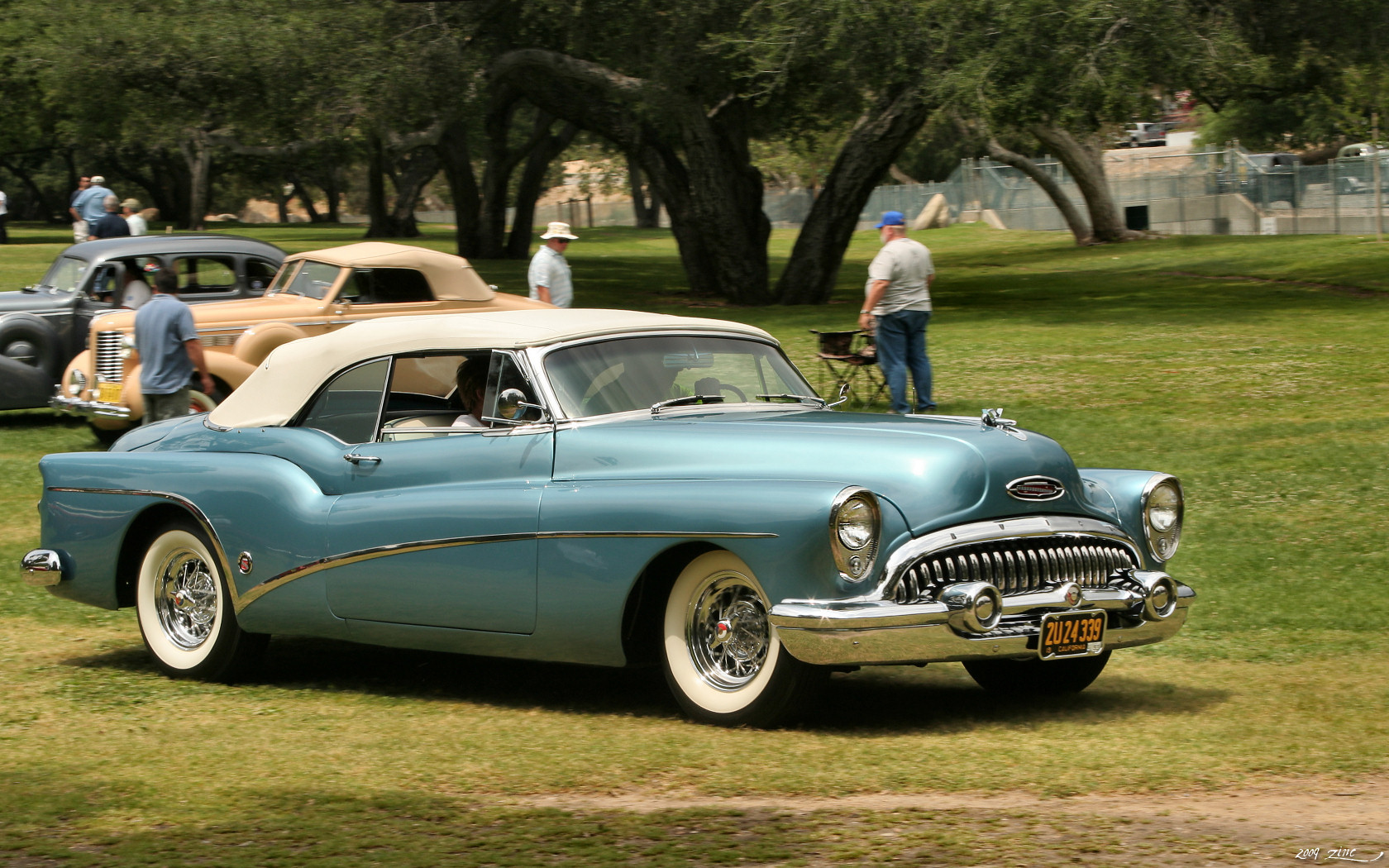
1953 Buick Roadmaster Skylark Series 70

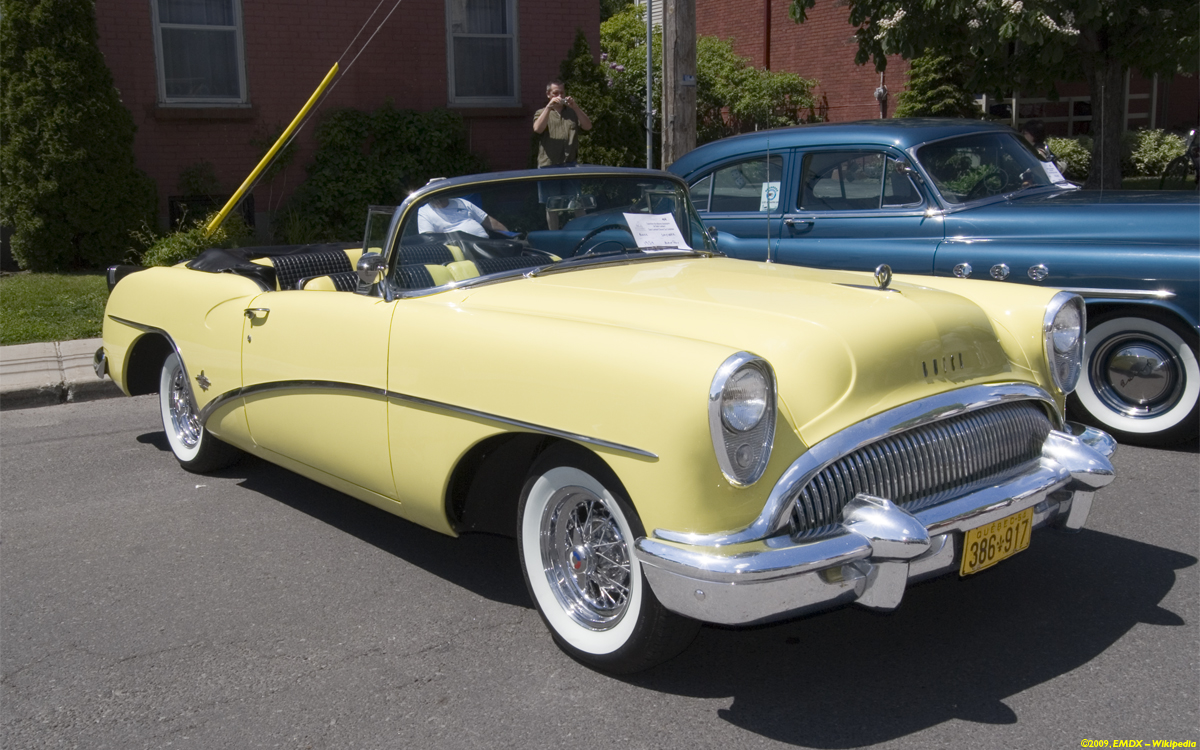
1954 Buick Skylark Model 100

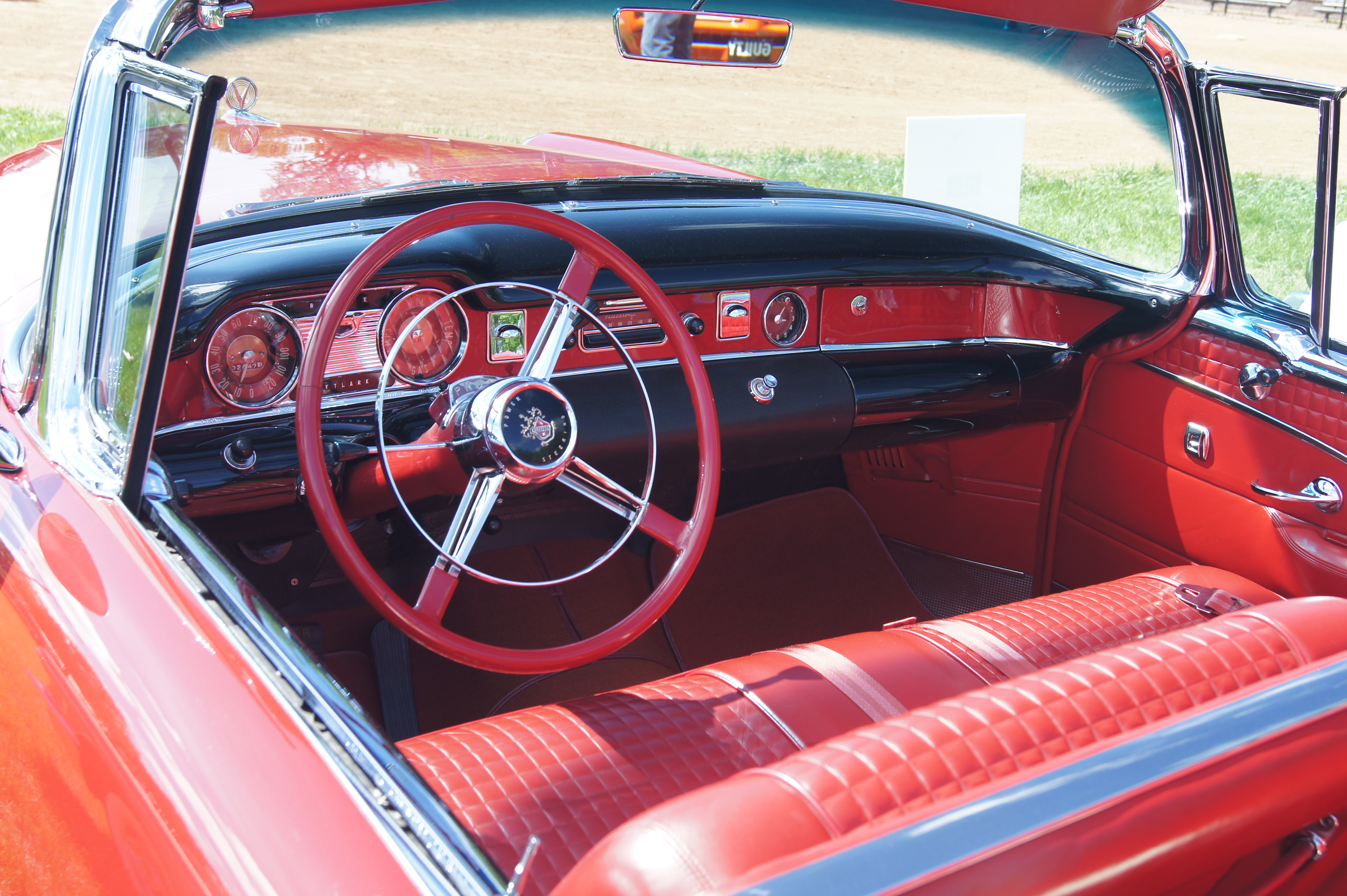
1954 Buick Skylark Model 100 interior

== First generation (1961–1963) ==
First generation
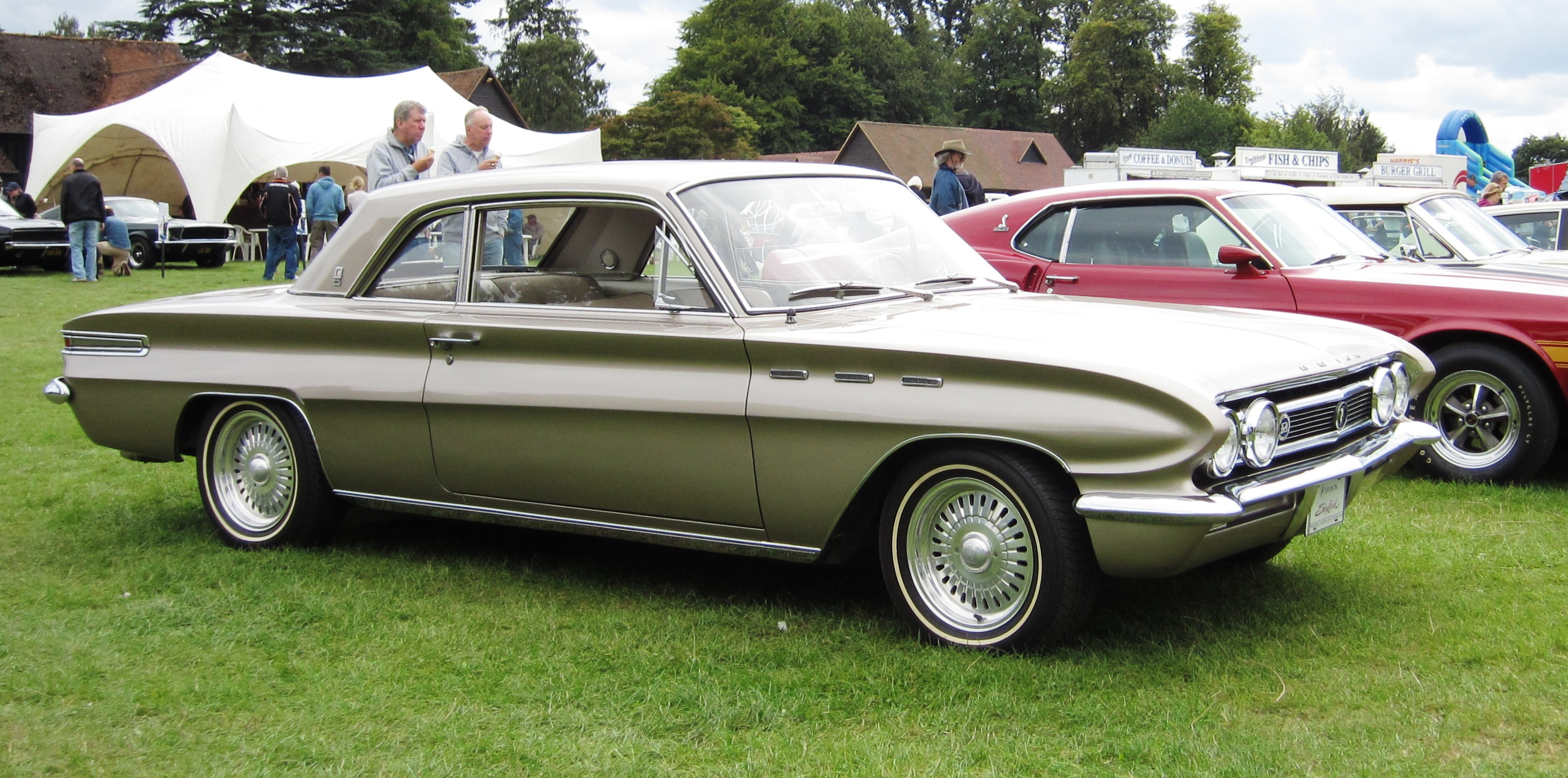
- 1961 Buick Special Skylark

Overview
- Also called: Buick Special Skylark
- Assembly: United States: Flint, Michigan (Buick City); Kansas City, Kansas (Fairfax Assembly); South Gate, California (South Gate Assembly)

Body and chassis
- Class: Compact
- Body style: 2-door convertible 2-door hardtop 2-door coupe 4-door Station wagon
- Layout: FR layout
- Platform: Y-body
- Related: Pontiac Tempest; Oldsmobile F-85

Powertrain
- Engine: 198 cu in (3.2 L) V6; 215 cu in (3.5 L) V8
- Transmission: 2-speed automatic 3-speed manual 4-speed manual

Dimensions
- Wheelbase: 112 in (2,845 mm)
- Length: 193 in (4,900 mm)
- Width: 70.2 in (1,783 mm)

In the fall of 1960, General Motors introduced a trio of new compact cars for the 1961 model year that shared the same chassis, engines, and basic sheet metal: the Buick Special, Pontiac Tempest, and Oldsmobile F-85. The Special's styling was strongly influenced by the new corporate look shared with the larger LeSabre, Invicta, and Electra also introduced in 1961.

In the middle of the 1961 model year the Buick Special Skylark made its debut. Effectively a luxury trim level, it was based on a two-door sedan (also referred to as a coupe), it featured unique Skylark emblems, taillight housings, lower-body side moldings, turbine wheel covers, and a vinyl-covered roof. 1961 Skylarks featured three Ventiports on each fender. A plush "Cordaveen" all-vinyl interior was standard, with bucket seats available as an option. Instrumentation was minimal, consisting of only a speedometer and fuel gauge.

The Skylark replaced the Special's standard aluminum block 215 cu in (3.5 L) two-barrel carburetor V8 with a higher compression ratio four-barrel version that boosted power from 155 hp (116 kW) at 4600 rpm to 185 hp (138 kW).

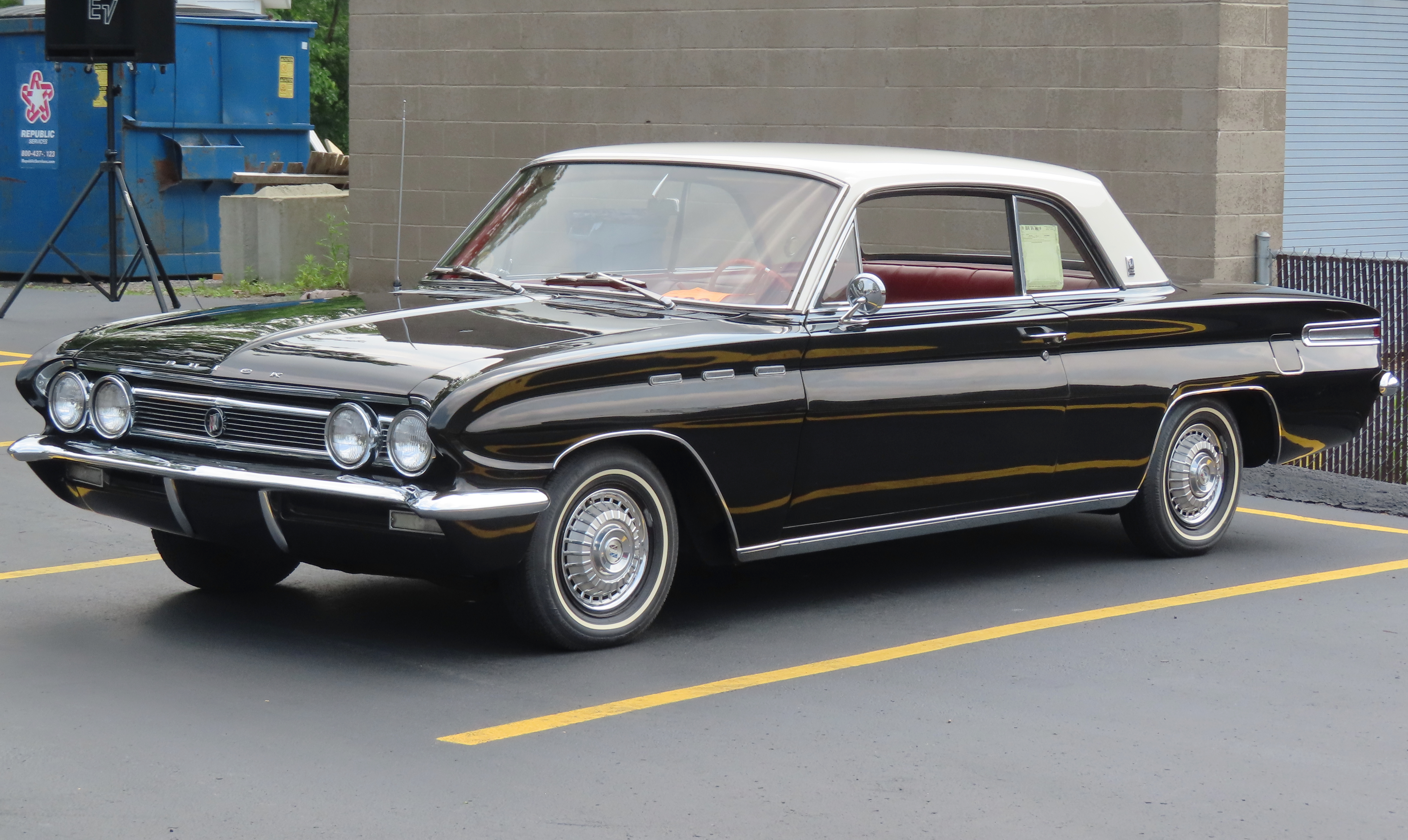
1962 Buick Skylark Sport Coupe

For the 1962 model year, the Skylark became a model in its own right. It used the previous year's basic sheet metal but was available in two new body styles: a two-door convertible coupe (shared with the Special and Special Deluxe models) and a two-door (pillarless) hardtop unique to it. Tuning of the 215-cubic-inch V8 increased power to 190 hp (140 kW) at 4800 rpm. In 1962, the Skylark Special was also the first American car to use a V6 engine in volume production; it earned Motor Trend's Car of the Year for 1962. This 198 cid Fireball V6 was engineered down from the 215 and used many of the same design parameters, but was cast in iron. Output was 135 hp (gross) at 4600 rpm and 205 lb⋅ft (278 N⋅m) at 2400 rpm. In their test that year, Road & Track was impressed with Buick's "practical" new V6, saying it "sounds and performs exactly like the aluminum V8 in most respects."

In 1963, the Special's body was restyled and minor changes made to the interior, particularly to the dash and instrument cluster. The 1963 Special was available as a two-door pillared hardtop coupe, a four dour sedan, a convertible, and a station wagon. Engine choices were a standard 198 cu in (3.2 L) V6 with a twin-barrel carburetor and an optional 215 cu in (3.5 L) V8 with 155 hp (116 kW) (two-barrel) or more powerful four-barrel (190 hp (140 kW) in 1962, 200 hp (150 kW) in 1963). Transmission choices were a 'three on the tree' manual transmission, a floor shift Borg-Warner T-10 four-speed manual, or a two-speed Turbine Drive automatic. The two speed "Dual Path Turbine Drive" automatic was a Buick design and shared no common parts with the better known Chevrolet Power-Glide transmission.

Two prototypes were made for 1962, each with a unique body. One a convertible and the other a hardtop. The prototypes came directly from Buick Engineering, both had been given two 4-barrel carburetors by the engineers thus increasing the prototype's horsepower a little more than 80 hp. They had features from the '61, '62, and the '63 production models. Some features, such as the two 4-barrel carburetors, were left out of the production-line Skylarks. The prototypes were also two inches (51 mm) longer, and wider than the production models. Of the two prototypes, only the hardtop still exists and resides with its owner in Michigan. It is possible the convertible prototype still exists in the Sloan Museum collection.

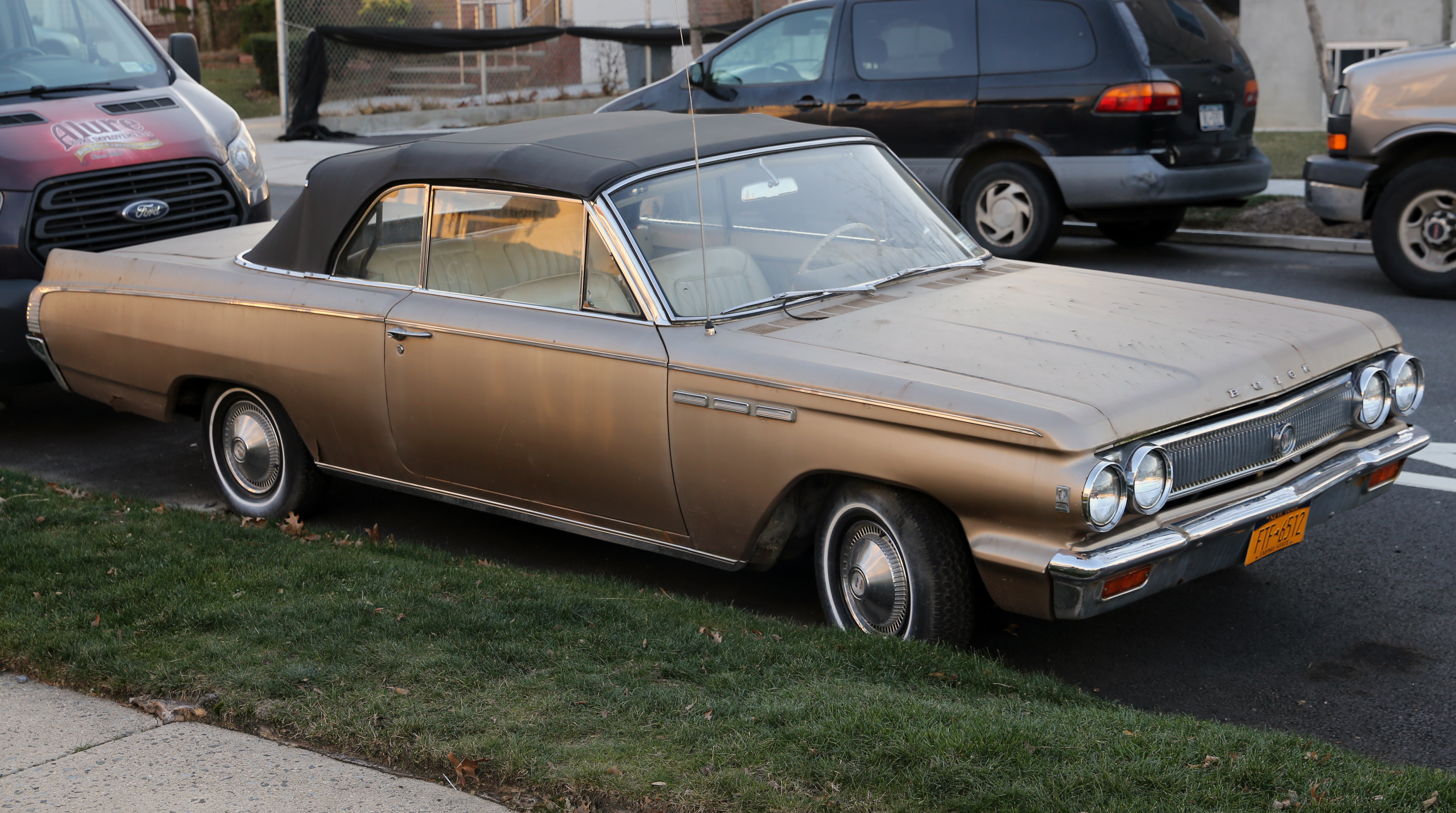
1963 Buick Skylark convertible

The 1963 Skylarks used the same chassis and wheelbase as the previous 1961 and 1962 models, but adopted new sheet metal that featured boxier styling. Length was increased by five inches (130 mm) to 193 in (4,900 mm), and the 215-cubic-inch V8 generated 200 hp (150 kW) at 5,000 rpm. The 1963 Skylark was available as a two-door convertible coupe or a two-door (pillarless) hardtop coupe. The 1963 Special shared most sheet metal with the Skylark, but was available as a convertible, station wagon as well as two- and four-door sedans. Engine choices included a 198 cu in (3.2 L) V6 with two-barrel carburetor, the 215 cu in (3.5 L) V8 with two-barrel or a four-barrel carburetor. Transmission choices were a "three on the tree" manual transmission, a floor-shifted Borg-Warner T-10 four-speed manual, or a two-speed automatic. The two-speed "Dual Path Turbine Drive" automatic was a Buick design and shared no common parts with the Chevrolet Power-Glide transmission. Instrument panel padding and a cigarette lighter was standard.

== Second generation (1964–1967) ==
Second generation
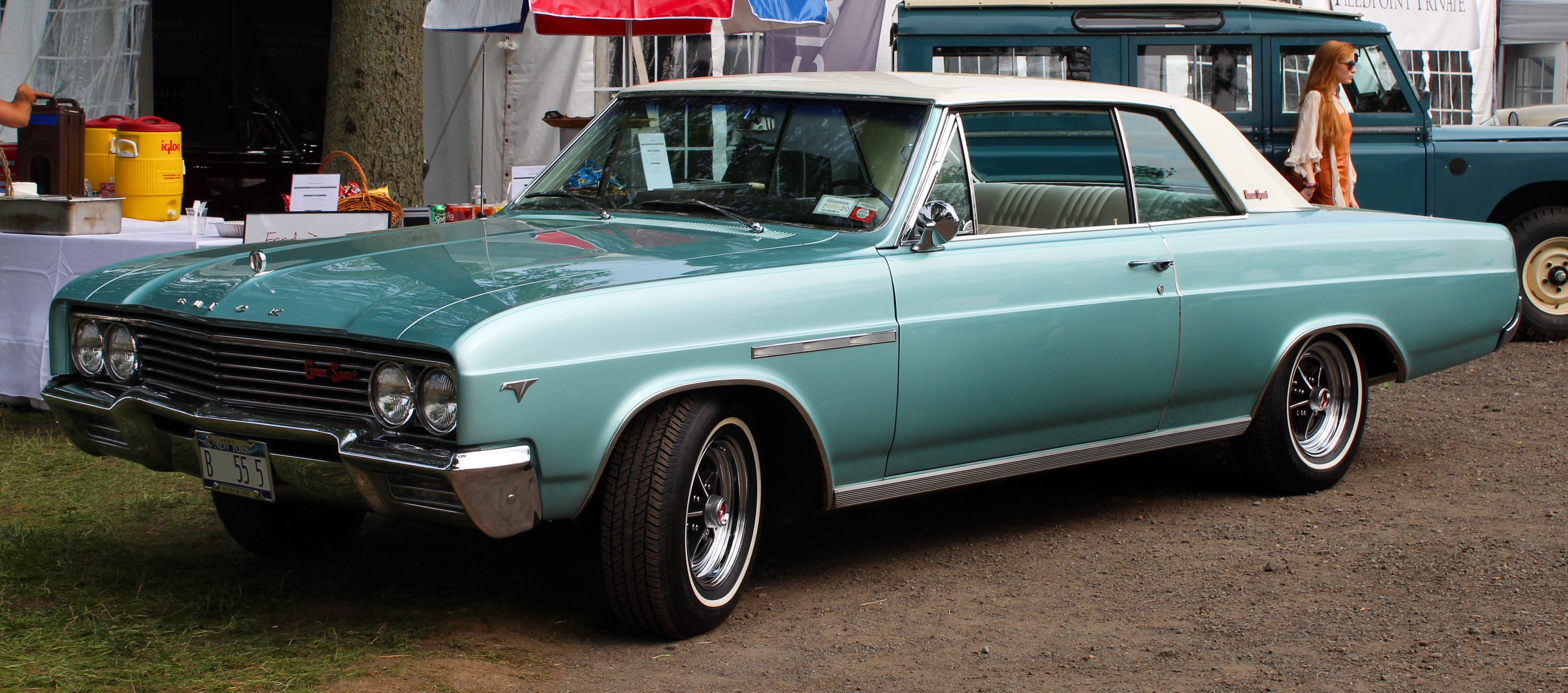
- 1965 Skylark hardtop coupe

Overview
- Production: 1964–1967
- Model years: 1964–1967
- Assembly: United States: Flint, Michigan (Buick City, primary); Baltimore, Maryland (Baltimore Assembly); Fremont, California (Fremont Assembly); Leeds, Missouri (Leeds Assembly)

Body and chassis
- Body style: 2-door convertible 2-door hardtop 4-door hardtop 2-door coupe 4-door sedan
- Layout: FR layout
- Platform: A-body
- Related: Buick Special; Oldsmobile Cutlass; Pontiac Le Mans; Chevrolet Chevelle; Buick Gran Sport; Pontiac GTO; Oldsmobile 442

Powertrain
- Engine: 225 cu in (3.7 L) Buick KH/LH/MH/NH V6; 300 cu in (4.9 L) Buick small-block V8; 340 cu in (5.6 L) Buick small-block V8; 400 cu in (6.6 L) Buick big-block V8; 401 cu in (6.6 L) Buick Nailhead V8
- Transmission: 2-speed Super Turbine 300 automatic 3-speed Roto Hydramatic; 4-speed manual 3-speed manual

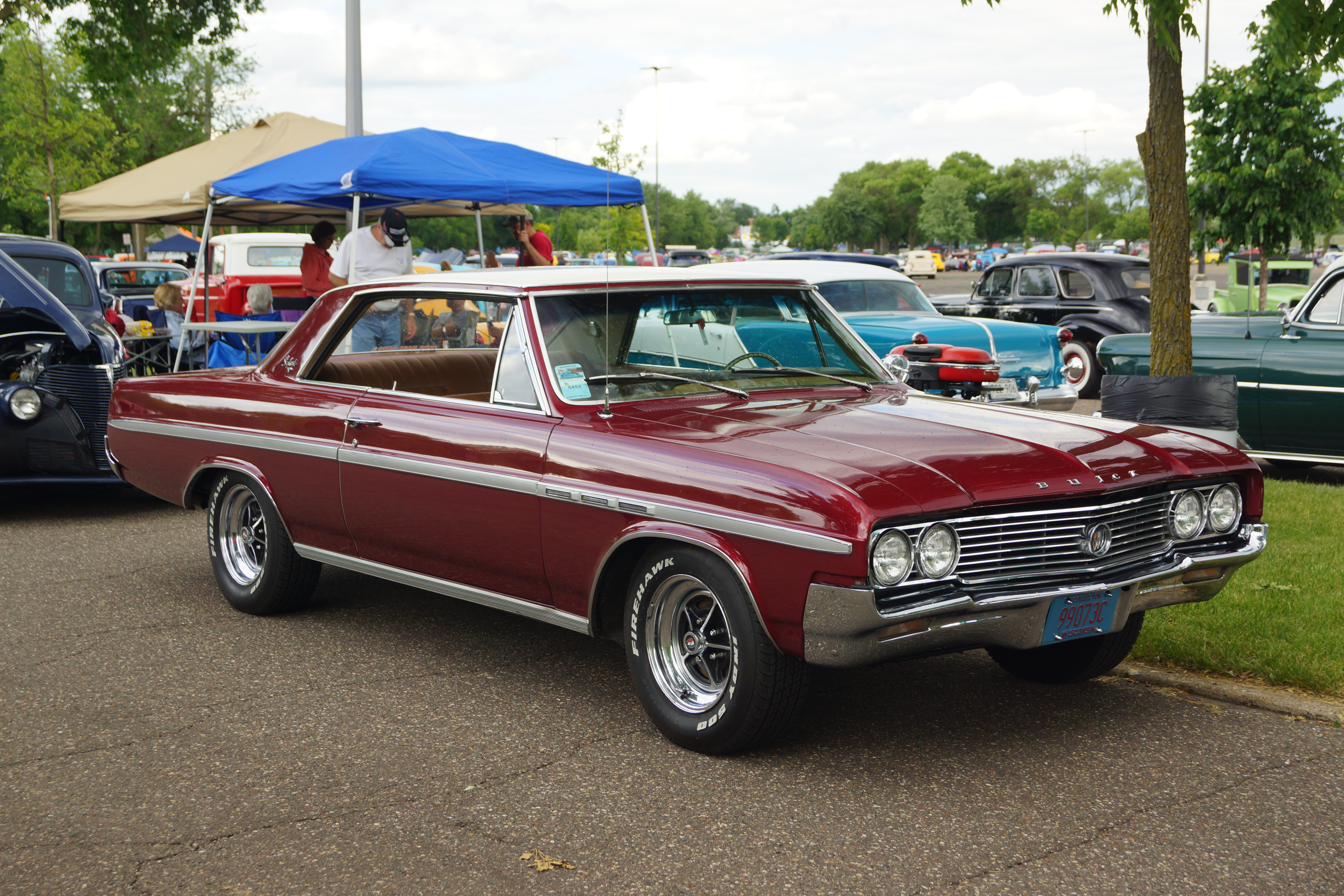
1964 Skylark coupe

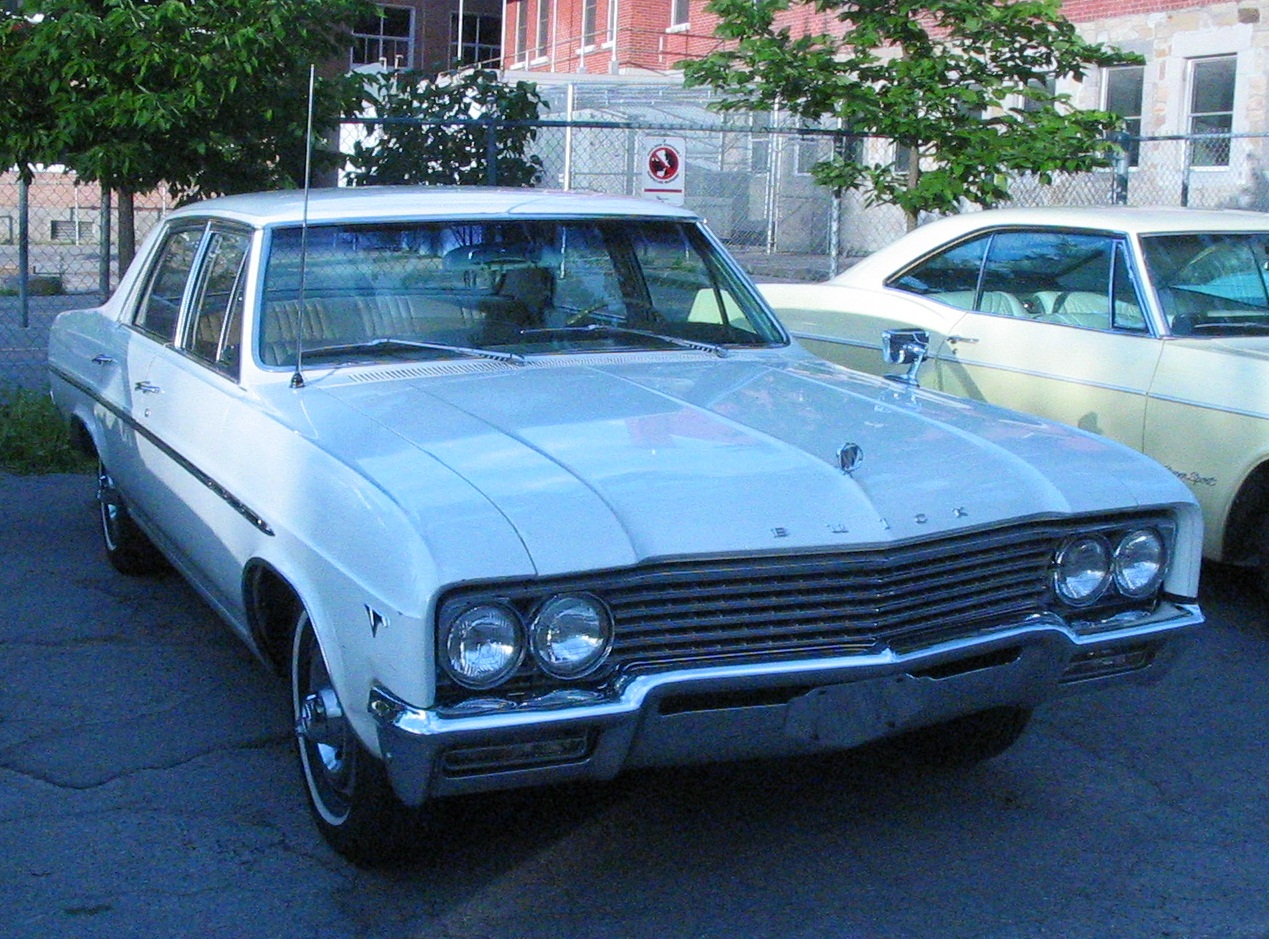
1965 Skylark sedan

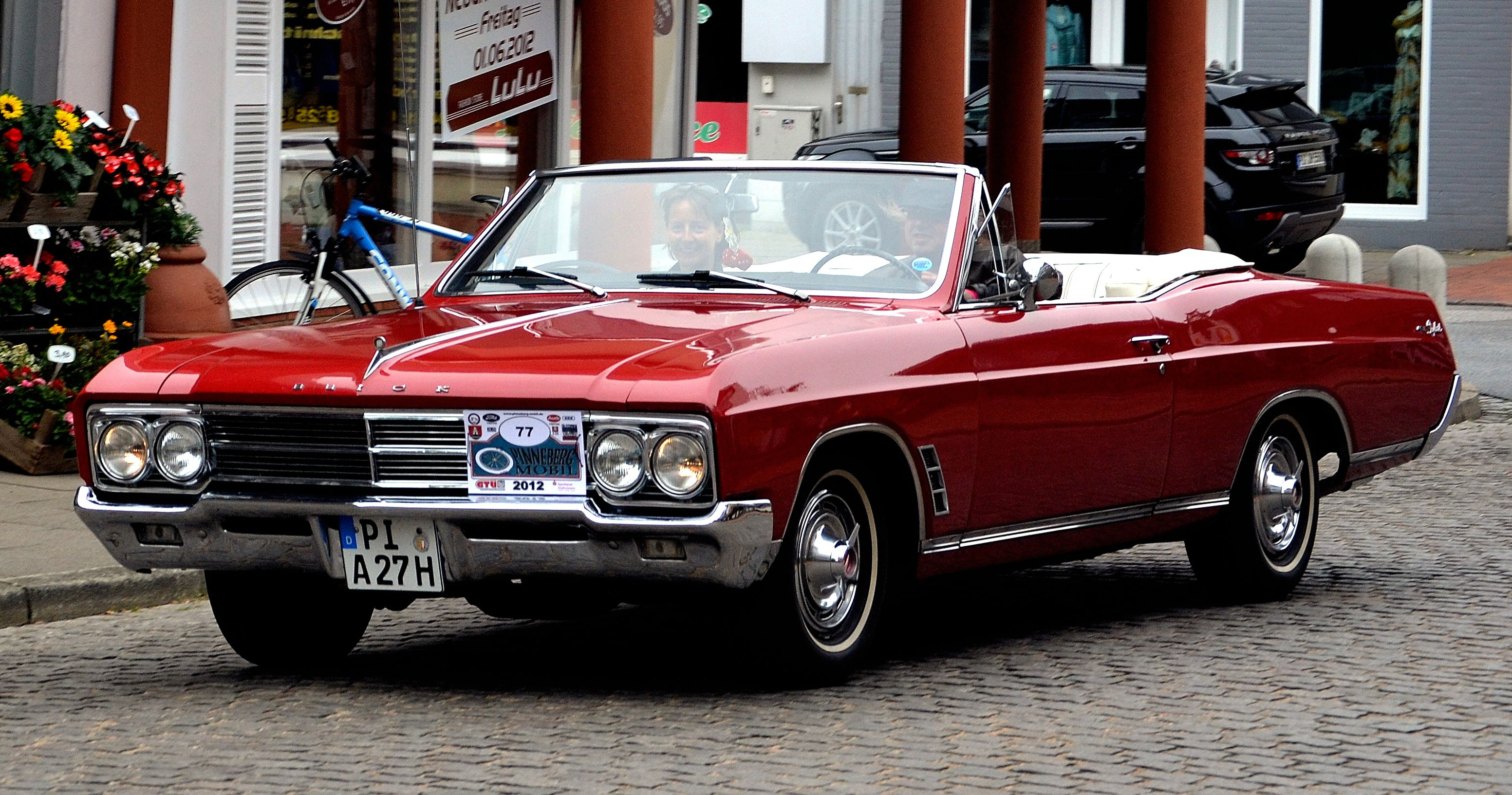
1966 Skylark Convertible

Beginning with the 1964 model year, the Skylark trim level had enough sales to merit its own separate line. Along with the lower-priced Special from which it was derived, the model would move to a new 115 in (2,921 mm) wheelbase intermediate-size chassis shared with the Oldsmobile F-85, Pontiac Tempest, and new Chevrolet Chevelle. Both Buicks had a length of 203.5 in (5,169 mm).

The standard 215-cubic-inch displacement, aluminum-block V8 engine was discontinued (and the associated tooling eventually sold to the British manufacturer Rover, who produced it as the Rover V8 engine until 2006).

In its place was a new 225-cubic-inch (3.7 L) all-cast-iron V6 with a Rochester 1-barrel carburetor that generated 155 hp (116 kW) at 4400 rpm. It is an enlarged version of the prior 198 cubic inches (3,240 cm^{3}) V6 introduced for the 1962 model year. The basic V8 option was a 300-cubic-inch, with cast-iron block, aluminum heads, and a Rochester 2-barrel carburetor that generated 210 hp (160 kW) at 4600 rpm. A high performance version was offered with 11:1 compression and a 4-barrel carburetor, generating 250 hp (190 kW). The V6 and V8 were of similar design and shared the same bore and stroke. A long-throw Hurst shifter was available for the four-speed manual transmission. For the 1965 model, cast-iron blocks and heads were used for all engines.

For the first time, a four-door sedan was offered in addition to the two-door convertible, two-door sedan, and hardtop coupe. Specials and Special Deluxes only came in pillared coupe versions. All Skylarks would have higher levels of exterior and interior trim than the Special and Special Deluxe from which they were derived. The sedan would come with cloth-and-vinyl seats standard, with an all-vinyl "Cordaveen" interior optional. All-vinyl bucket seats were standard on the convertible and optional on the hardtop coupe. The Skylark Coupe had a lower, more road-hugging profile than the other models. Buick's traditional VentiPorts were integrated into the front half rub strip that ran the entire length of the vehicle, with later versions appearing vertically stacked as on the Buick Wildcat.

Inspired by the sales success of the Pontiac GTO, a Gran Sport option became available in mid-1965, offered as a coupe, hardtop or convertible. The Gran Sport featured Buick's 401-cubic-inch "Nailhead" V8 with a Carter 4-barrel carburetor that produced 325 hp (242 kW) at 4400 rpm, listed as 400 cubic inches in sales literature to elude a General Motors limit of 400 cubic inches in intermediate-sized cars. Unique Gran Sport badging, a heavy-duty radiator, and dual exhaust were also added.

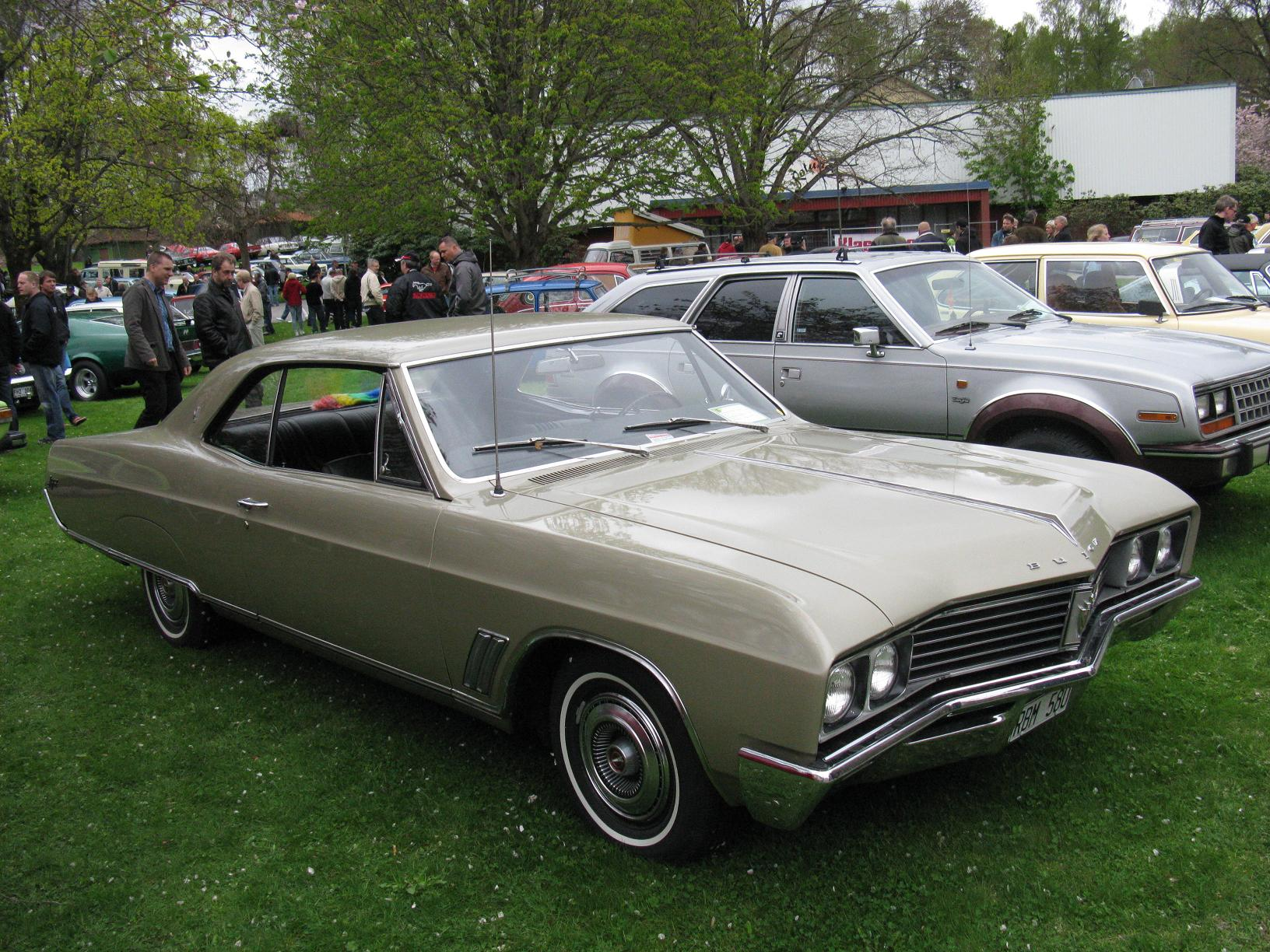
1967 Skylark coupe

In the 1966 model year, the pillared four-door sedan was replaced by a four-door hardtop. The 1966 two-door Skylark was available with the optional 340-cubic-inch "Wildcat 375", engine which produced 260 hp (194 kW) and 365 lb⋅ft (495 N⋅m) torque with a 4-barrel Carter carb. The four-door sedan would rejoin the lineup for the 1967 model year, making a total of five Skylark body styles. The 225 V6 was standard on the two-door sedan, the 300-cubic-inch V8 on all other models, but the four-door hardtop sedan, which came with a 340-cubic-inch V8 engine using a Rochester two-barrel carburetor and producing 220 hp (164 kW) at 4400 rpm.

In 1967 Skylarks included the federally-mandated safety equipment as other U.S. market passenger cars, including a dual-circuit hydraulic brake system, energy-absorbing steering column and wheel, four-way hazard flashers, shoulder belt mounting points for outboard front passengers, softer interior surfaces, and recessed controls on the instrument panel.

The Gran Sport became the Gran Sport 400 to reflect the new, marginally smaller but more modern big-block engine and to set it apart from the new Gran Sport 340, a lower cost model using the 340-cubic-inch V8, available only as a two-door hardtop coupe.

=== Engines ===
- Buick KH/LH/MH/NH 225 cu in (3,692 cc; 3.7 L) V6 (1964–67)
- Buick small-block 300 cu in (4,923 cc; 4.9 L) V8 (1964–67, 1964–65 Sport Wagon)
- Buick small-block 340 cu in (5,574 cc; 5.6 L) V8 (1967 Skylark 4-Door Hardtop Sedan, 1967 GS 340, 1966–67 Sport Wagon)
- Buick Nailhead 401 cu in (6,572 cc; 6.6 L) V8 (1965-66 Gran Sport)
- Buick big-block 400 cu in (6,554 cc; 6.6 L) V8 (1967 GS 400)

== Third generation (1968–1972) ==
Third generation
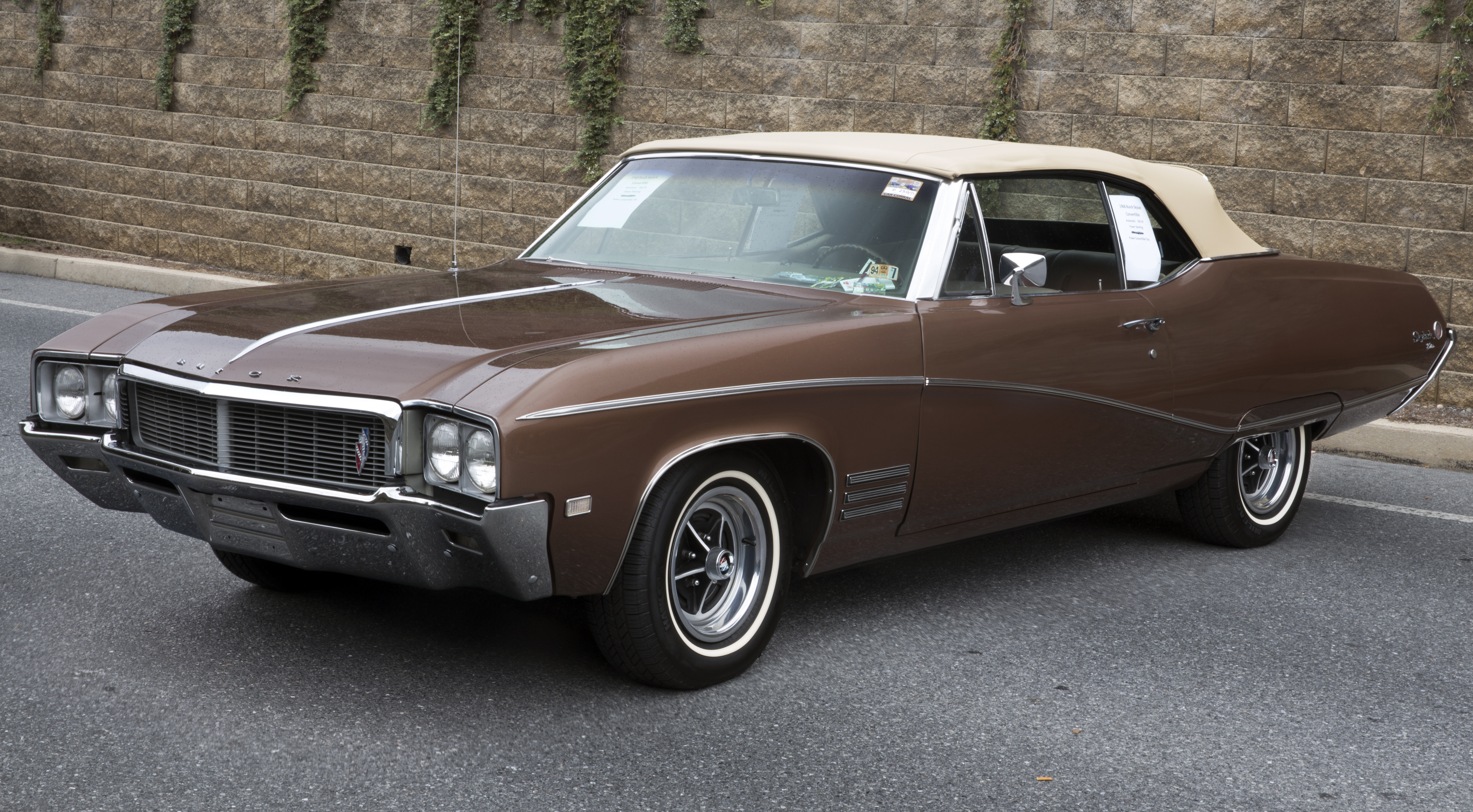
- 1968 Buick Skylark Custom Convertible

Overview
- Model years: 1968–1972
- Assembly: United States: Flint, Michigan (Buick City, primary); Baltimore, Maryland (Baltimore Assembly); Framingham, Massachusetts (Framingham Assembly); Fremont, California (Fremont Assembly); Leeds, Missouri (Leeds Assembly); Wilmington, Delaware (Wilmington Assembly); Canada: Oshawa (Oshawa Assembly)

Body and chassis
- Body style: 4-door sedan 2-door coupe 2-door convertible 2-door hardtop 4-door hardtop 4-door station wagon
- Layout: FR layout
- Platform: A-body
- Related: Acadian Beaumont; Buick Special; Chevrolet Chevelle; Pontiac Tempest; Pontiac LeMans; Oldsmobile F-85; Oldsmobile Cutlass; Oldsmobile Cutlass Supreme (performance coupes); Pontiac GTO; Oldsmobile Hurst/Olds; Buick GSX; Chevrolet Chevelle SS (coupe utility); Chevrolet El Camino; GMC Sprint

Powertrain
- Engine: 250 cu in (4.1 L) Chevrolet I6; 350 cu in (5.7 L) Buick V8; 400 cu in (6.6 L) Buick V8; 455 cu in (7.46 L) Buick V8
- Transmission: 3-speed manual 2-speed Super Turbine 300 automatic 3-speed THM350 automatic (1969 only)

Dimensions
- Wheelbase: 112 in (2,845 mm) 2-door coupe, hardtop and convertible 116 in (2,946 mm) 4-door sedan and station wagon
- Length: 201.9 in (5,128 mm) 2-door coupe, hardtop and convertible 205.9 in (5,230 mm) 4-door sedan 212.6 in (5,400 mm) station wagon
- Width: 76.2 in (1,935 mm) 2-door coupe, hardtop and convertible 76.8 in (1,951 mm) 4-door sedan and station wagon
- Curb weight: 3,515 lb (1,594 kg)

The 1968 model year was one of significant change for the Buick Skylark. Although still using the same basic chassis, all of GM's mid-sized cars adopted a policy of using two different length wheelbases. Two-door models used a shorter wheelbase of 112 in (2,845 mm), while four-door models used a longer wheelbase of 116 in (the Buick Sport Wagon and Oldsmobile Vista Cruiser used an even longer wheelbase of 121 in). All of GM's mid-sized cars received all-new sheet metal, incorporating a semi-fastback appearance, which was a revival of a streamlining on all GM products from 1942 until 1950 as demonstrated on the Buick Super Club Coupe (sedanette), that showed influences from the restyled Riviera. More Federally mandated safety features improved occupant protection and accident avoidance, including side marker lights, shoulder belts (on all models built after January 1, 1968), and parking lights that illuminated with headlights.

The Buick Gran Sport, previously an option package available on the Skylark, became a separate series, starting with the 340 hp/440 lbs torque 400 c.i.d. V8 1968 GS 400, using the 2-door Skylark body and chassis. In a reshuffling of models in the lineup, the Special Deluxe replaced the previous Special. The Skylark nameplate was shuffled down a notch to replace the previous Special Deluxe. The previous Skylark was replaced by a new Skylark Custom.

The basic Skylark was available as a two-door hardtop coupe or a four-door sedan. The Skylark Custom came as a two-door convertible coupe, two-door hardtop coupe, four-door hardtop sedan, or four-door sedan.

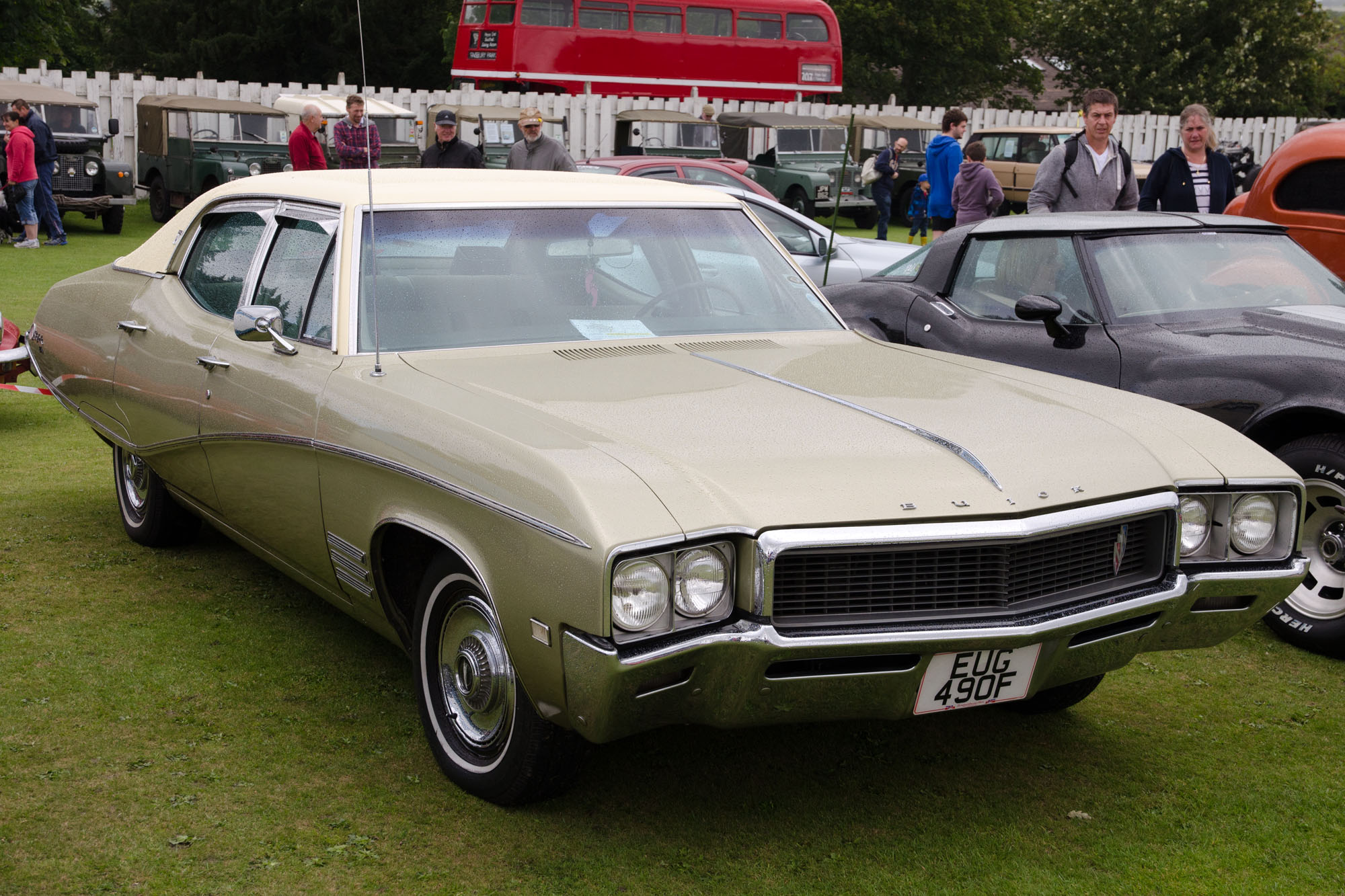
1968 Buick Skylark Custom 4-Door Sedan

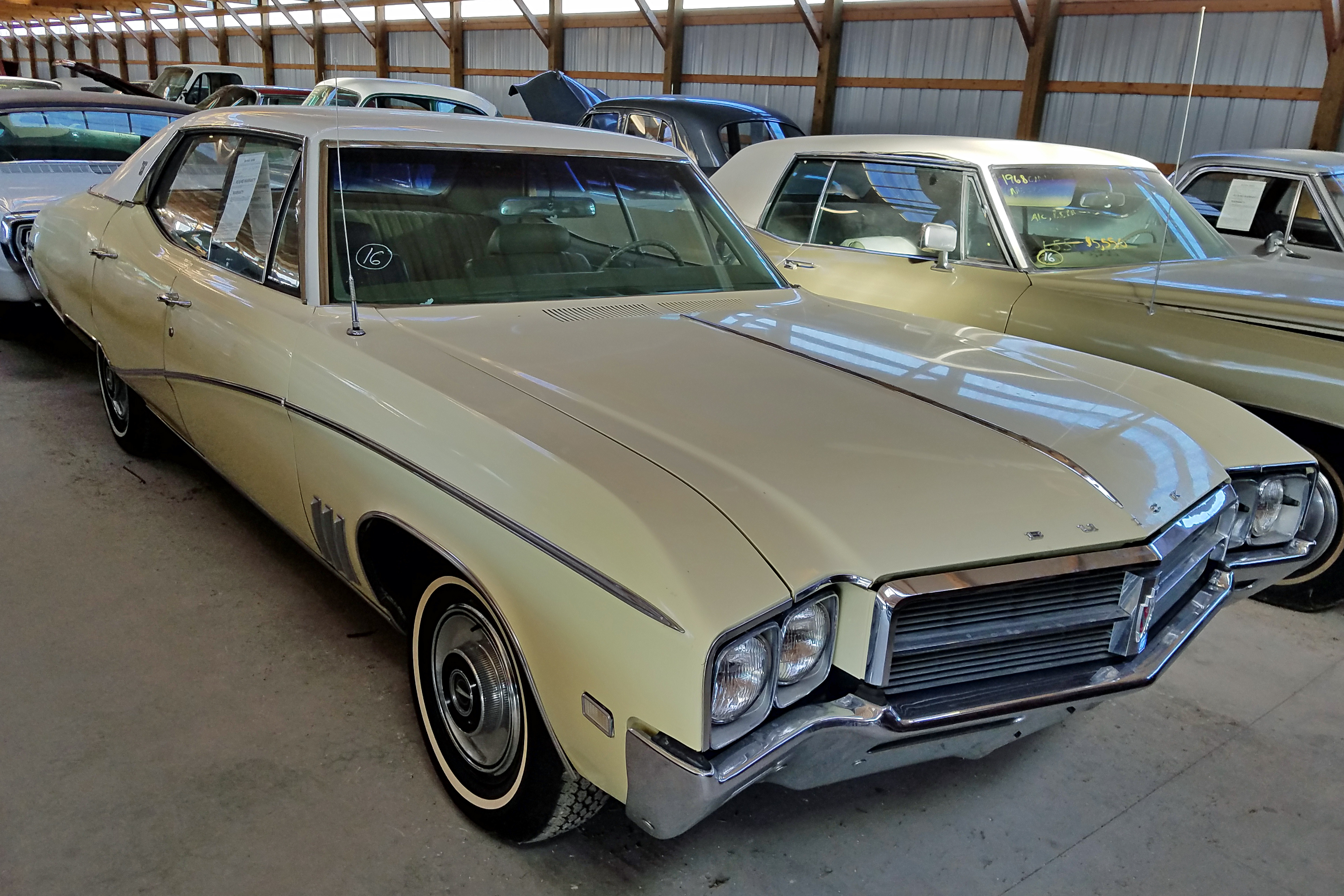
1969 Buick Skylark hardtop sedan

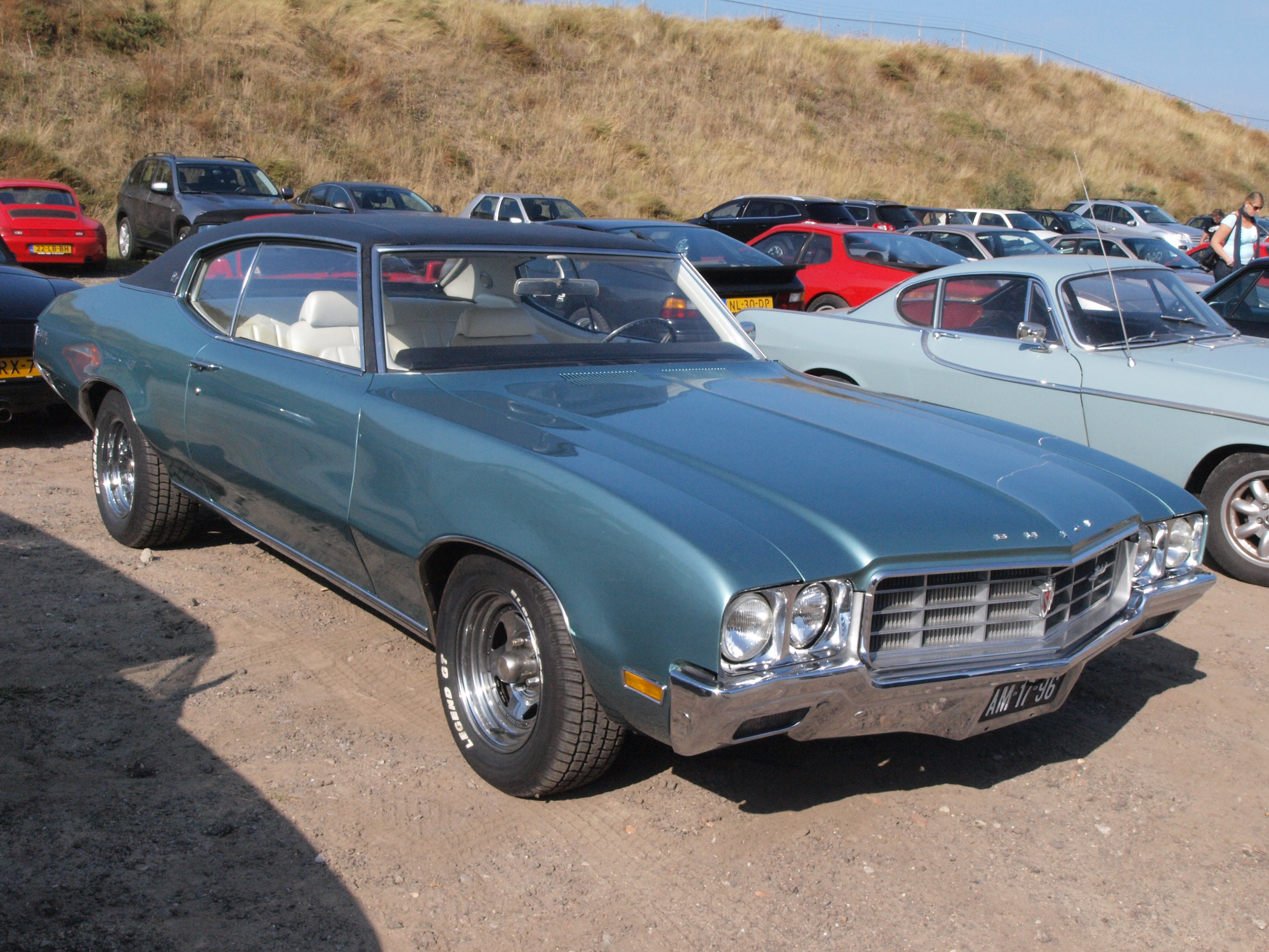
1970 Buick Skylark coupe

The previous V6 was discontinued and the associated tooling was sold to Kaiser Industries, which used the V6 in its Jeep trucks and sport utility vehicles. The base engine in Buick Skylarks (and Buick Special sedans) became a 250-cubic-inch 250 cu in (4.1 L) Chevrolet I6, that produced 155 hp (116 kW) at 4200 rpm using a single-barrel Rochester carburetor.

Optional on the Skylark and standard on the Skylark Custom was a new 350-cubic-inch V8 derived from the 340, using a two-barrel Rochester carburetor that produced 230 hp (170 kW) at 4400 rpm. The Buick Special name was dropped after the 1969 model year. A locking steering column with a new, rectangular ignition key became standard on all 1969 GM cars (except Corvair), one year ahead of the Federal requirement.

For 1970, the mid-sized Buicks once again received new sheet metal and the Buick Skylark name was moved down another notch, replacing the previous entry-level Buick Special. It was available in two- and four-door sedans with the 250-cubic-inch inline-six as standard and the optional 350-cubic-inch V8 (260 horsepower at 4600 rpm). Two-door models shared their roofline with the 1970 Chevelle, distinct from that of the shared Pontiac LeMans and Oldsmobile Cutlass. The two-door sedan was unique to Buick, sharing its roofline as the hardtop but having a thick "B" pillar, with Buick's traditional "Sweepspear" feature appearing as a crease running the length of the vehicle. Chevrolet did not offer a pillared coupe for the Chevelle from 1970 to 1972; all two-doors were hardtops.

Replacing the previous Buick Skylark was the Buick Skylark 350, available as a two-door hardtop coupe or four-door sedan with the 350-cubic-inch V8 as standard equipment. This 350-cubic-inch engine was a different design than the Chevy's 350 CID engine (4.000 in × 3.48 in) the Buick design had a longer stroke and smaller bore (3.80 X 3.85 in) allowing for lower-end torque, deep-skirt block construction, higher nickel-content cast iron, 3.0 in (76 mm) crank main journals, and 6.5 in (165 mm) connecting rods, the distributor was located in front of the engine (typical of Buick), the oil pump was external and mounted in the front of the engine, the rocker arm assembly had all rocker arms mounted on a single rod and were not adjustable. The Skylark Custom continued to be available, also using the 350-cubic-inch V8 as standard equipment and still available as a two-door convertible coupe, two-door hardtop coupe, four-door hardtop sedan, and four-door sedan. Buick Gran Sport models continued to be available as a separate series. The Buick Sport Wagon name was now used on a conventional four-door station wagon that no longer featured a raised roof with glass panels over the cargo area, or a longer wheelbase, as in the past. It now used the same 116 in (2,946 mm) wheelbase as the Buick Skylark four-door sedan and the now-discontinued Buick Special four-door Station Wagon. It became, in effect, a Buick Skylark four-door station wagon in all respects but the name.

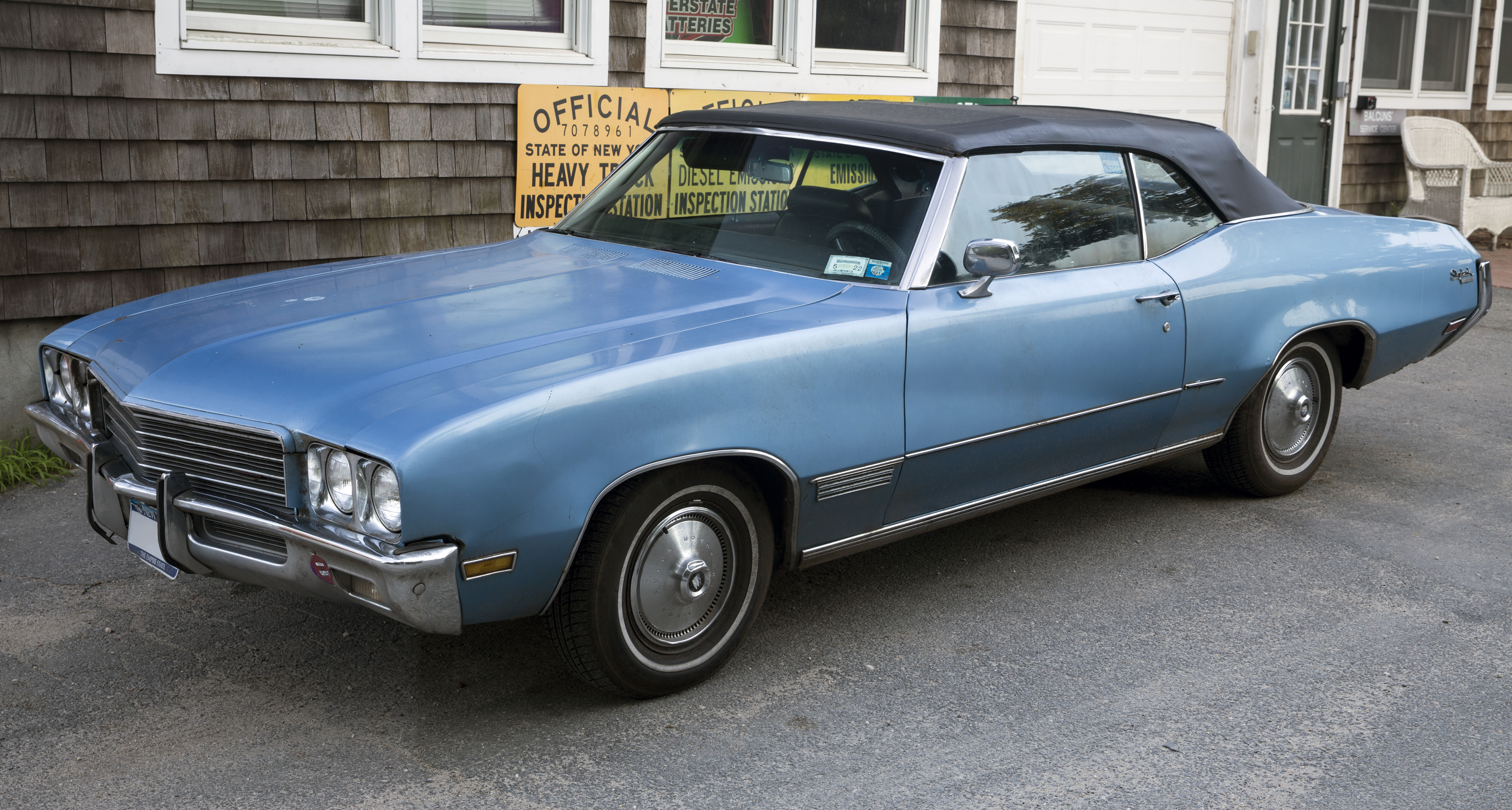
1971 Buick Skylark Custom convertible

For the 1971 model year, the base Skylark was available only with the inline-6, now only putting out 145 hp (108 kW) due to emission control devices, but in a two-door hardtop coupe body-style (in addition to the previous two- and four-door sedans). The Skylark 350 had a V8 engine that put out only 230 hp (170 kW). It was now available as a two-door sedan in addition to the previous two-door hardtop coupe and four-door sedan.

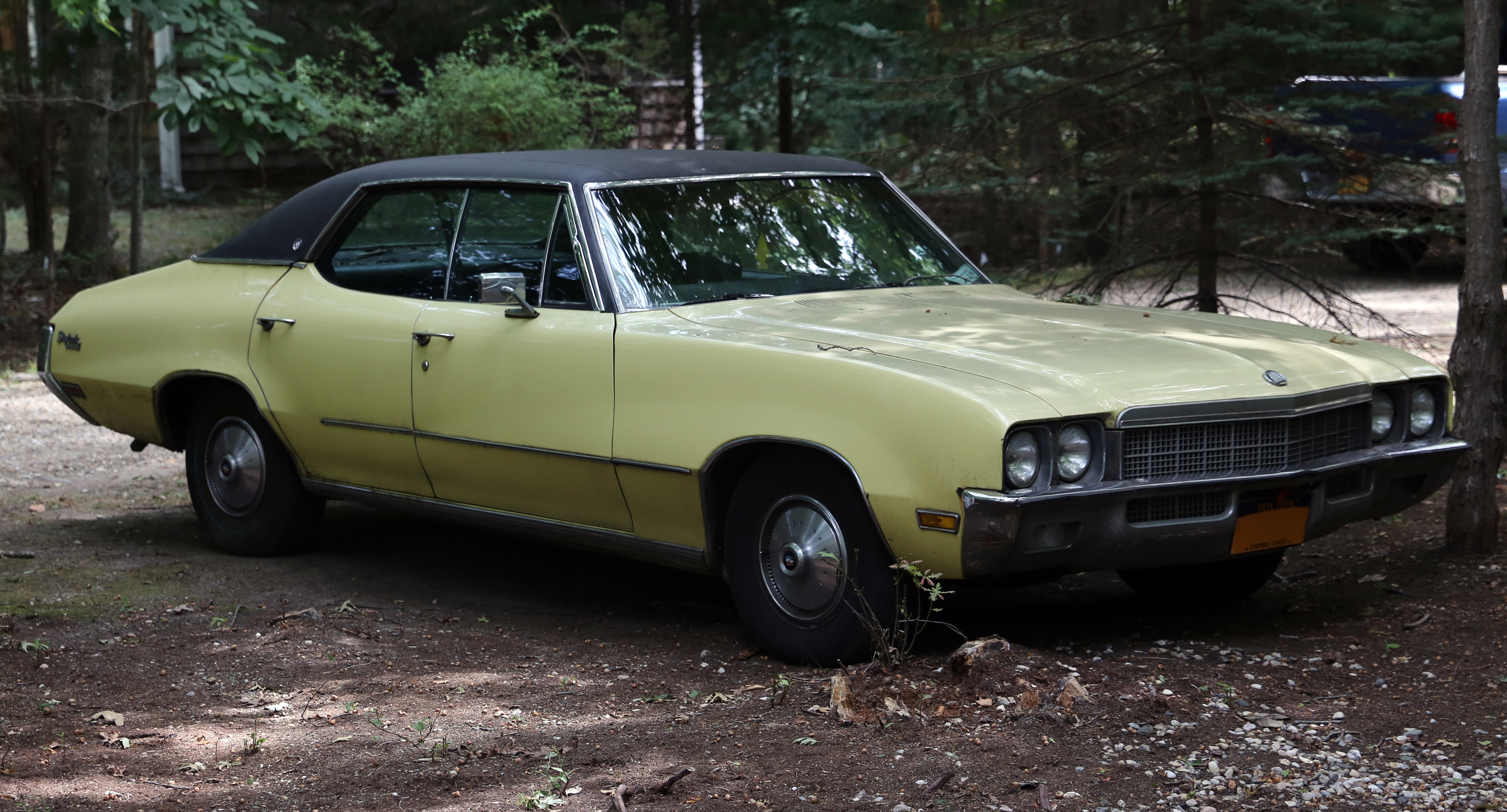
1972 Buick Skylark Custom 4-door Hardtop Sedan

1972 was the last model year for the mid-sized Buick Skylark. During this model year many pollution controls were added to the engines, Compression was lowered, engines had to accept leaded and unleaded gas, and spark timing was retarded (no vacuum advance in lower gears) while driving in lower gears to reduce emissions. For 1972, the base Buick Skylark used the 350-cubic-inch V8 with the 2-barrel Rochester carburetor (now putting out 145 horsepower) as standard equipment. A new federally mandated system to calculate power was put into effect that year, and the actual engine performance was probably comparable but slightly lower because of pollution controls in the 1972 model year to the 230 hp (172 kW) that was listed for the previous year. The Skylark 350 now used a version of the same V8 engine as the base Skylark, but with a 4-barrel Rochester carburetor that generated 180 hp (134 kW).

Skylark Customs were available with the same 350-cubic-inch V8 engines available in the basic Skylark and the Skylark 350. The Custom had an upgraded interior and dash with some extra chrome. Convertibles only came in the Skylark Customs and the Skylark 350s.

=== Engines ===
- Chevrolet "six" 250 cu in (4,093 cc; 4.1 L) I6 (1968–71), supplied by Chevrolet
- Buick small-block 349 cu in (5,724 cc; 5.7 L) V8 (1968–72, 1968–72 Sport Wagon, 1968–69 California Gran Sport, 1968–69 Gran Sport 350, 1970–71 Gran Sport, 1972 Gran Sport 350)
- Buick big-block 400 cu in (6,554 cc; 6.6 L) V8 (1968–69 GS 400, 1968–69 Sport Wagon 400)
- Buick big-block 455 cu in (7,459 cc; 7.5 L) V8 (1970–72 Gran Sport 455)

== (1973–1974) Skylark Hiatus ==
For 1973, GM redesigned the A-body platform, but Buick dropped the Skylark nameplate and revived one of its old ones for their mid-size: the "Century". The Century Estate replaced the Buick Sport Wagon. The Century inherited the Gran Sport performance option, but the Gran Sport name was once again reduced to being an option package.

== Fourth generation (1975–1979) ==
Fourth generation
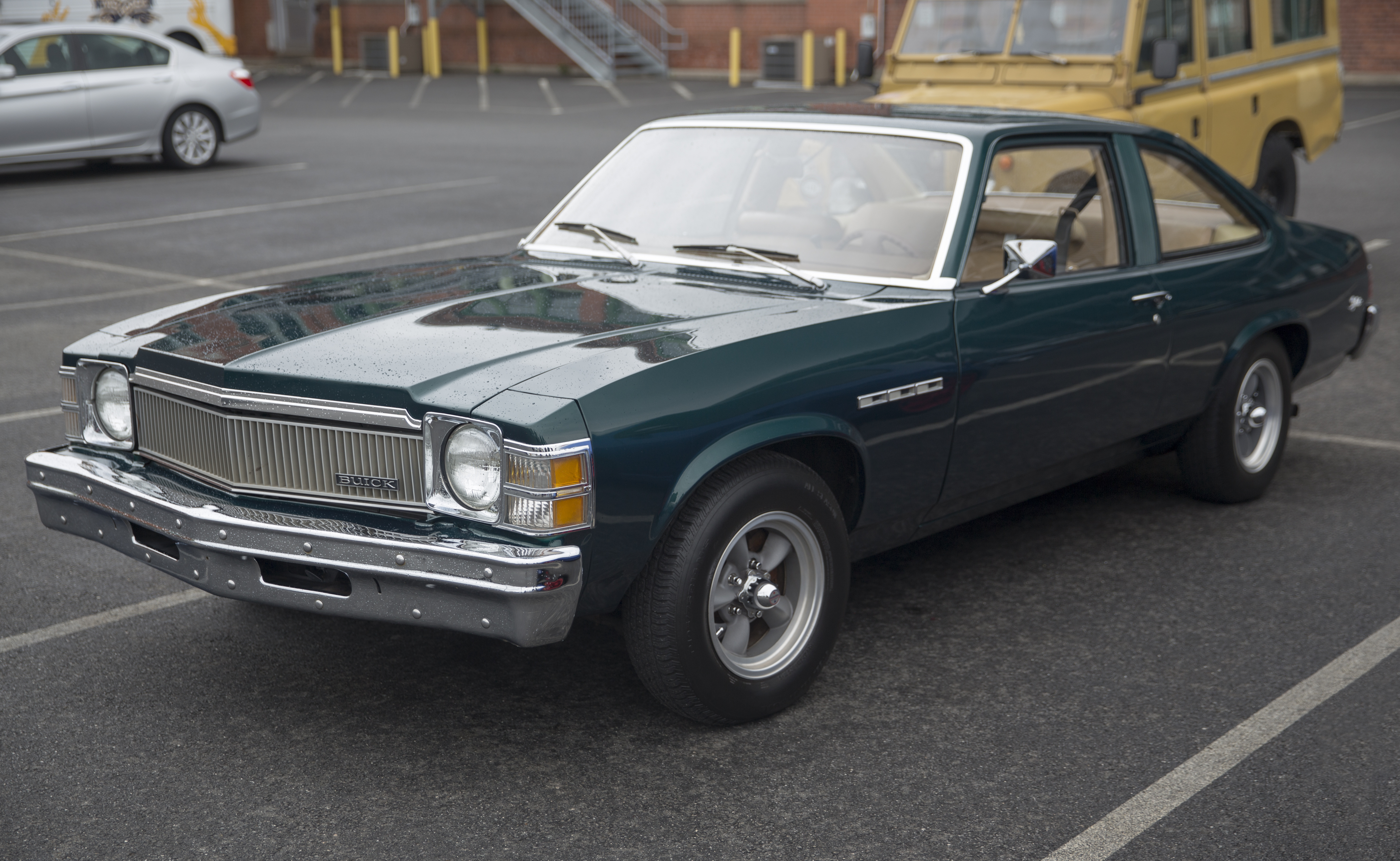
- 1977 Skylark S 2-door coupe

Overview
- Also called: Buick Apollo; Buick Iran
- Model years: 1975–1979
- Assembly: United States: Leeds, Missouri (Leeds Assembly); North Tarrytown, New York (North Tarrytown Assembly); Van Nuys, California (Van Nuys Assembly); Ypsilanti, Michigan (Willow Run Assembly); Canada: Oshawa (Oshawa Assembly); Iran: Tehran (1976–87)

Body and chassis
- Class: Compact
- Body style: 2/4-door sedan 2-door hatchback
- Layout: FR layout
- Platform: X-body
- Related: Chevrolet Nova; Pontiac Ventura; Pontiac Phoenix; Oldsmobile Omega

Powertrain
- Engine: 231 cu in (3.8 L) Buick V6; 260 cu in (4.3 L) Oldsmobile V8; 301 cu in (4.9 L) Pontiac V8; 305 cu in (5.0 L) Chevrolet V8; 350 cu in (5.7 L) Buick V8; 350 cu in (5.7 L) Chevrolet V8
- Transmission: 3-speed manual; 4-speed M-21 manual; 4-speed M-22 manual; 5-speed Borg-Warner T-50 manual; 3-speed THM350 automatic; 3-speed THM400 automatic

When GM's compact X-body platform was extensively restyled for the 1975 model year, Buick retained the Apollo name for their four-door sedan, while their two-doors (hatchback and sedan) were both rechristened "Skylark".

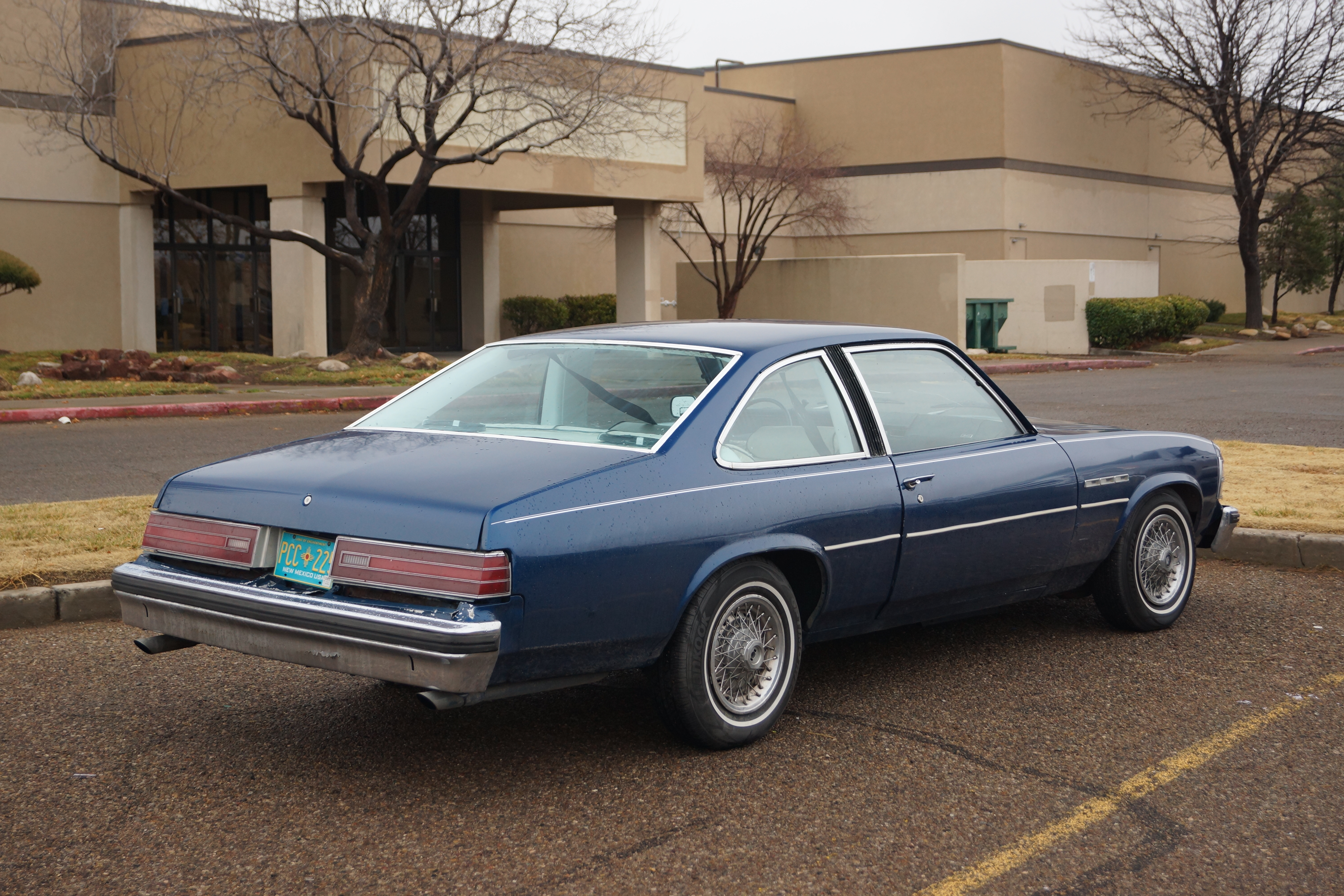
1976 Buick Skylark 2-door

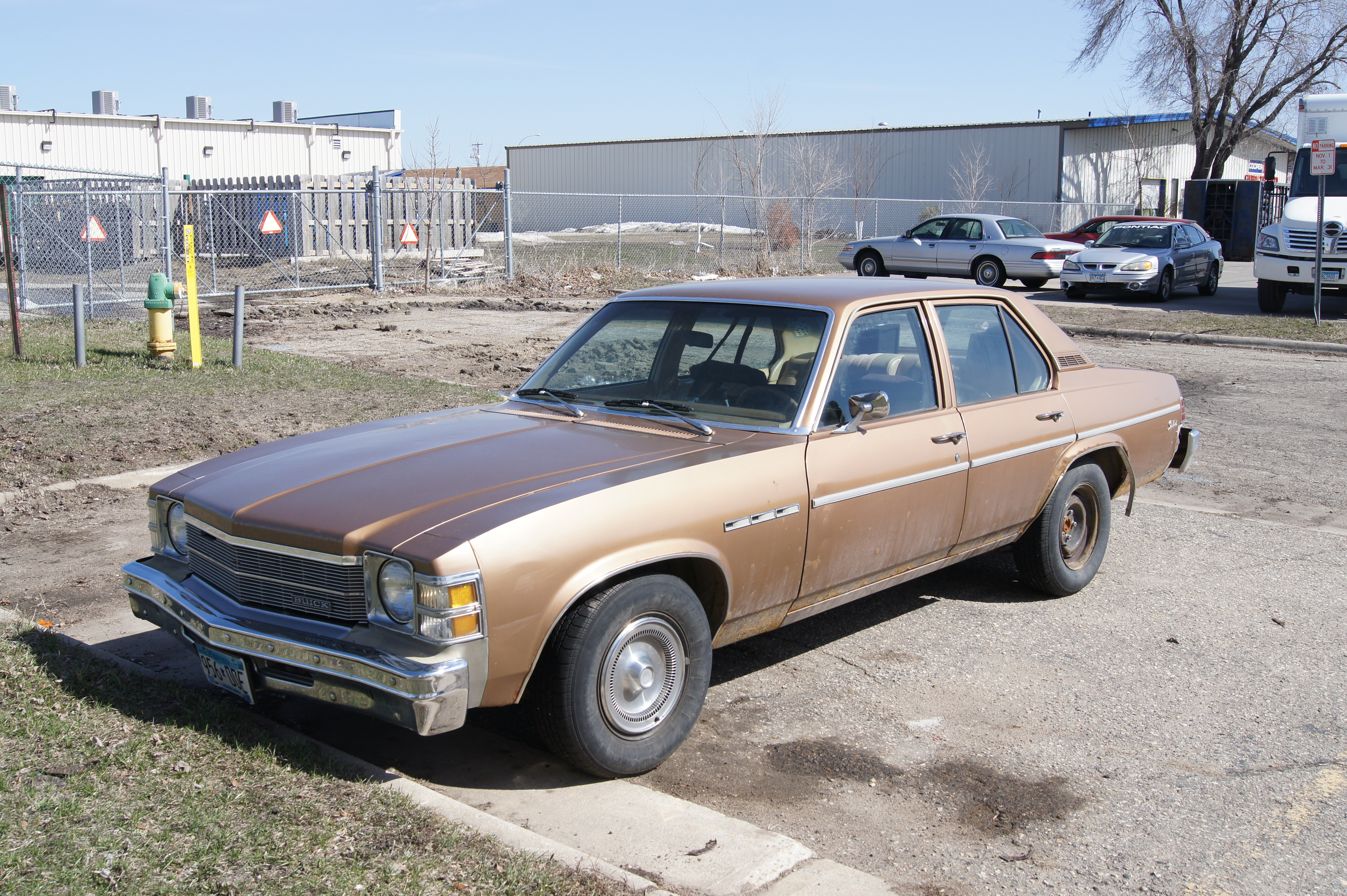
1976 Buick Skylark sedan

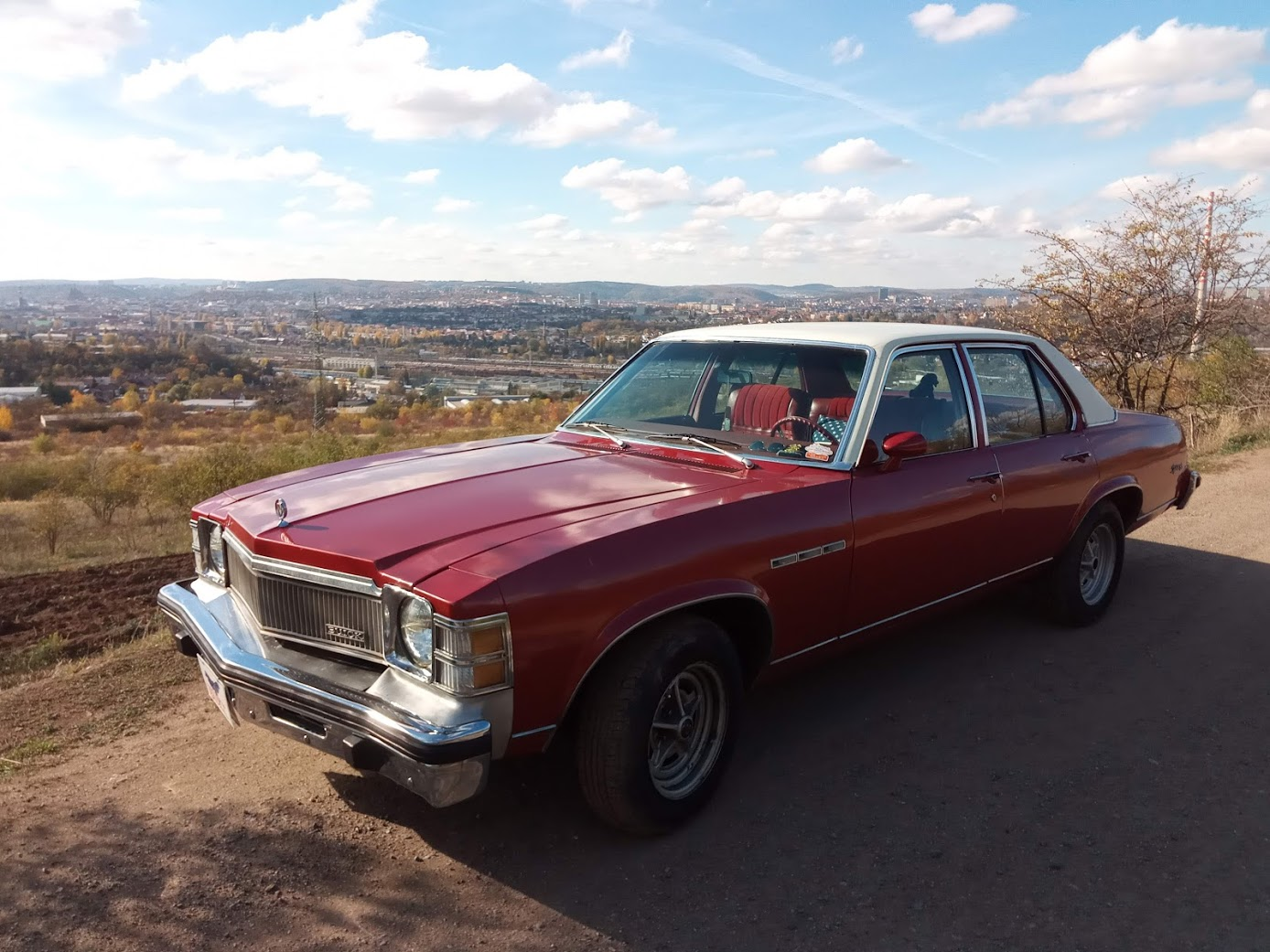
1977 Buick Skylark S/R sedan

Both the Apollo and the Skylark were available in Base and S/R versions; the S/R (Sports/Rallye) being European-inspired and more upscale. The Skylark sedan was also available as a very plain, lower-priced Skylark "S" with minimal interior and exterior trim.

Gone since 1968, the "VentiPorts" design element reappeared, integrated into the front half of the rub strip that ran the length of the vehicle.

The standard engine for the Buick Skylarks was Buick's own 231-cubic-inch (3.8 L) V6 engine with a 2-barrel carburetor creating 110 hp (82 kW) at 4000 rpm. Buick purchased back the tooling for the engine from American Motors, which acquired them when the company purchased the Kaiser Jeep division from Kaiser Industries. The Apollo used Chevrolet's 250-cubic-inch (4.1 L) inline 6-cylinder engine. Optional engines included the Oldsmobile 260-cubic-inch (4.3 L) V8 with a two-barrel carburetor producing 110 hp (82 kW) at 4,000 rpm, and the Buick 350-cubic-inch (5.7 L) V8 with either a 2- or 4-barrel carburetor. In 1976, the 5.7 L V8 engines produced 140 hp (100 kW) at 3,200 rpm with the 2-barrel carburetor, and 155 hp (116 kW) at 3,400 rpm with the 4-barrel carburetor.

Beginning with the 1976 model year, the four-door sedans used the Skylark and Skylark S/R names instead of the previous Apollo badge, and came with the 3.8 L V6 engine as standard. The 260-cubic-inch (4.3 L) V8 was discontinued after the 1976 model year. For the 1977 model year, it was replaced by a pair of V8 engines. The grille was also modified lightly for 1977, without the horizontal division and with a somewhat heavier appearance.

To commemorate the Bicentennial of the United States, the standard colors available on all Buicks were Judicial Black, Liberty White, Pewter Gray, Potomac Blue, Continental Blue, Concord Green, Constitution Green, Mount Vernon Cream, Buckskin Tan, Musket Brown, Boston Red and Independence Red, with specially available colors on select models Congressional Cream, Revere Red, Colonial Yellow and Firecracker Orange.

Available as an option in 1977 was a 301-cubic-inch (4.9 L) V8 with a 2-barrel carburetor, which produced 135 hp (101 kW) at 4000 rpm (supplied by Pontiac). Also available was a 305-cubic-inch (5.0 L) V8 with a 2-barrel carburetor, which produced 145 hp (108 kW) at 3800 rpm (supplied by Chevrolet). The Buick-built 5.7 L V8 was still available, but only with the 4-barrel carburetor.

Beginning with the 1978 model year, Chevrolet's 5.7 L (350-cubic-inch) V8 with a four-barrel carburetor, which produced 170 hp (130 kW) at 3,800 rpm, also was available. Also in that year, the Skylark Custom replaced the Skylark S/R as the most luxurious variant. The 1978s also received some very light cosmetic changes to the corner lights and grille.

The 1979 model year saw the discontinuance of the Skylark Custom two-door hatchback coupe (the base V6 produced 10 hp (7.5 kW) more than 1978's version). The 1979 model year was short because, midway through it, the all-new 1980 models were introduced early.

=== Buick Skylarks in Iran ===
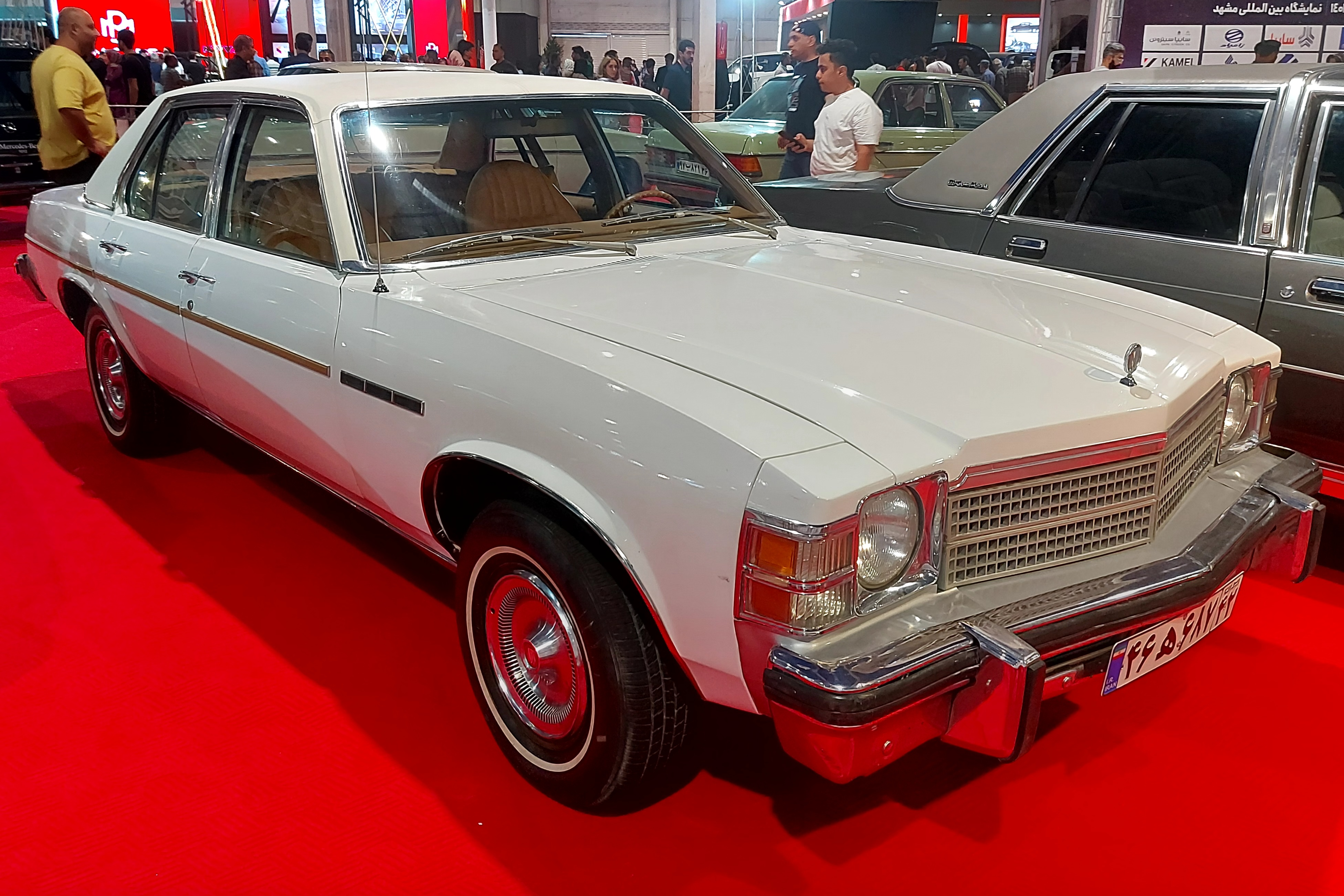
Buick Iran, Made by GM Iran

Buick Skylarks were assembled in Iran (four-door sedans only) from 1977 to 1981 and again from 1986 to 1988 under the brand name of "Buick Iran". The first generations were known as B1, B2, B3, B4, B5, from 1977 until 1981, and the second and last generation was known as the B2 and B3 from 1986 until 1988. The later models were made after GM released the kits and parts to Iran following the GM's debt to Iran General Motors. These cars were equipped with a 5.7L engine (small block 350 Chevrolet, L engine, 4 barrel carburettor), and were fully equipped (power door locks, power window, power steering, automatic transmission, a/c, vinyl top). The Cadillac Seville and Chevrolet Nova were manufactured in Iran during the same period. A total of 40,000 GM cars were produced between 1977 and 1987 in Iran. These models were basically the same as those built in the U.S. from 1975 to 1979 (Islamic Revolution).

GM Iran changed its name to Pars Khodro (meaning "Pars Automobile" in Iranian, "Pars" being the ancient, original name of Persia) after 1979. The production continued from 1979 to 1987 on a part-time, occasional basis. Since the spare parts and the assembly-line equipment were not used between 1979 and 1986.

GM ceased the production of all vehicles in Iran in 1987.

=== Engines ===
- 231 cu in (3,791 cc; 3.8 L) Buick "231" V6 (1975–1979)
- 261 cu in (4,269 cc; 4.3 L) Oldsmobile "260" V8 (1975–1976)
- 302 cu in (4,942 cc; 4.9 L) Pontiac "301" V8 (1977–1979)
- 305 cu in (5,001 cc; 5.0 L) Chevrolet "305" V8 (1977–1979)
- 349 cu in (5,724 cc; 5.7 L) Buick "350" V8 (1975–1979)
- 350 cu in (5,733 cc; 5.7 L) Chevrolet "350" V8 (1978–1979)

== Fifth generation (1980–1985) ==
Fifth generation
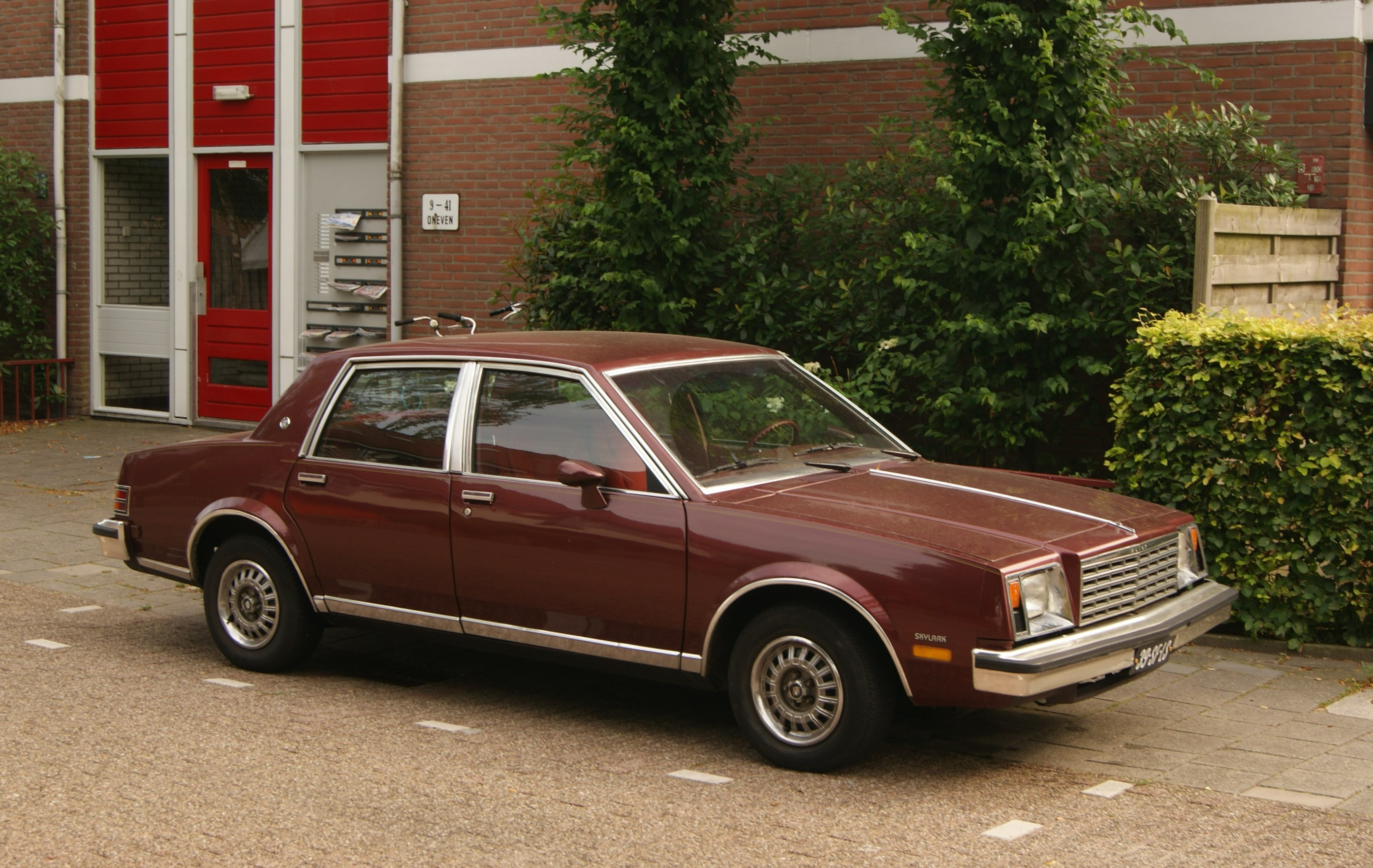
- 1980 Skylark

Overview
- Production: 1979–1985
- Model years: 1980–1985
- Assembly: United States: North Tarrytown, New York (North Tarrytown Assembly); Ypsilanti, Michigan (Willow Run Assembly)

Body and chassis
- Class: Compact
- Body style: 2-door coupe 4-door sedan
- Layout: Transverse front-engine, front-wheel drive
- Platform: X-body
- Related: Chevrolet Citation; Pontiac Phoenix; Oldsmobile Omega

Powertrain
- Engine: 2.5 L LR8 I4; 2.8 L LE2 V6; 2.8 L LH7 V6
- Transmission: 3-speed Turbo-Hydramatic 125 automatic; 4-speed manual

The 1980–1985 Skylark was Buick's badge engineered version of GM's new X-body architecture, shared with the Chevrolet Citation, Pontiac Phoenix, and Oldsmobile Omega and would bear some resemblance to the larger G-body mid-size cars. GM's X-body would also become the basis for GM's A-body mid-size cars that would be introduced as 1982 models. The new Skylark was introduced in the spring of 1979 as an early 1980 model featuring front-wheel drive, MacPherson strut front suspension and transversely mounted engine, items that had never appeared on Buick products. The new optional 60 degree 2.8 L V6 engine was developed specifically for the X-cars. This platform became the basis for nearly all following GM front-wheel drive vehicles, but like the other X-body cars was noted for numerous reports of a tendency to lock the rear wheels upon emergency braking, potentially causing the driver to lose control and crash (1980 models only). It was the first post-World War II Buick to offer a four-cylinder engine since the Buick Four was discontinued in 1918. The Skylark was available in two- or four-door sedan bodystyles, and in base, Sport, or Limited trims. The standard 2.5 L Iron Duke 4 used a 2-barrel Rochester carburetor and produced 90 hp (67 kW) at 4000 rpm. The optional 2.8 L V6 also used a 2-barrel Rochester carburetor and produced 115 hp (86 kW) at 4800 rpm. A four-speed manual overdrive transaxle was standard with a three-speed automatic transaxle as an option.

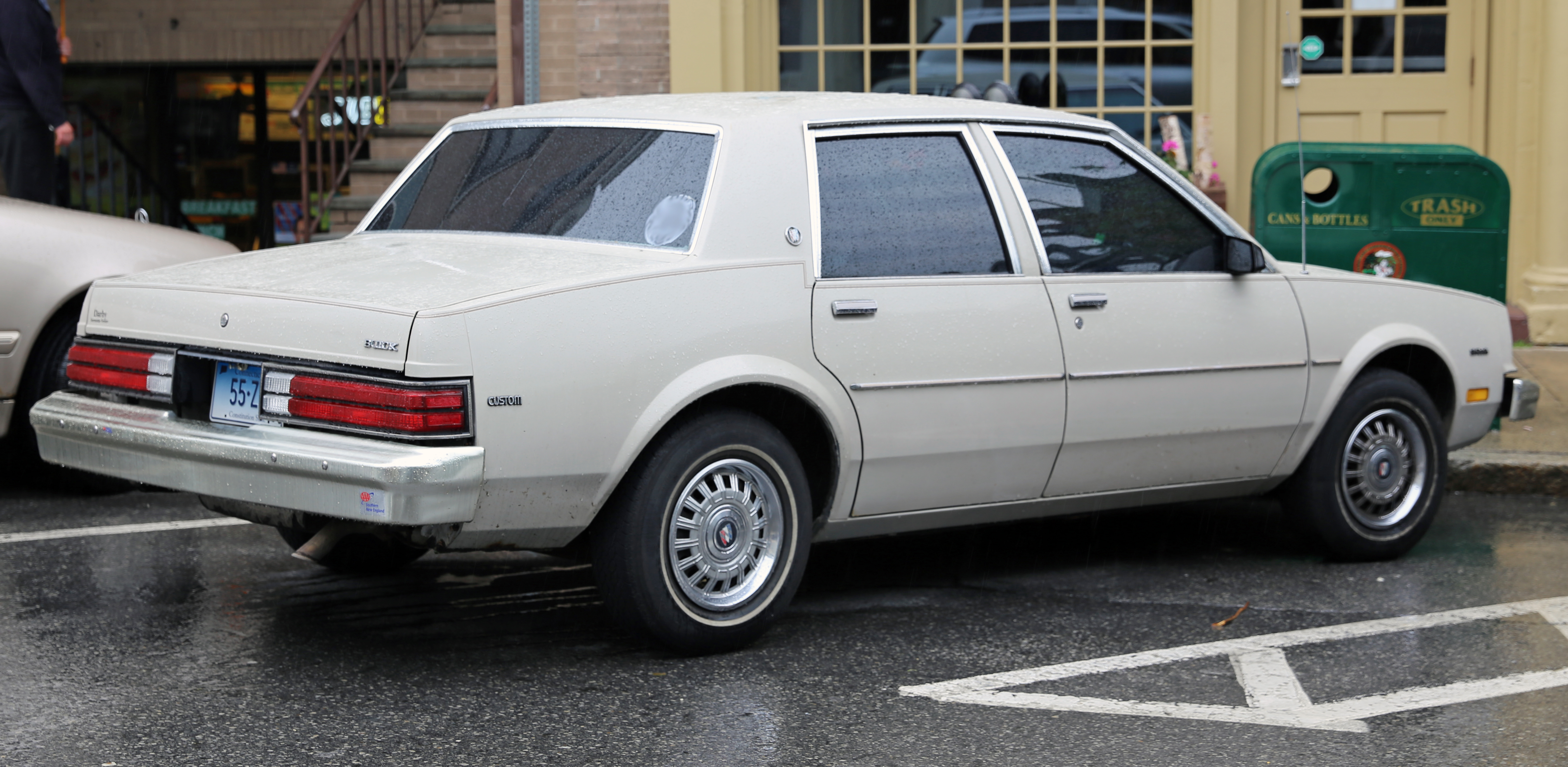
1983–1984 Buick Skylark Custom, rear view

For the 1982 model year, the base 2.5 L engine received throttle body fuel injection (TBI). The optional 2.8 L V6 was joined by a more powerful high-output version that produced 135 hp (101 kW) at 5400 rpm. Also for the 1982 model year, the Skylark received a mild facelift in the form of a new grille (the front parking lamps moved from outside the headlights to inside). In model year 1983, the base Skylark became the Skylark Custom. The Sport model was replaced by the T-Type, which was available only as a two-door coupe and came with the high-output version of the 2.8 L V6 engine as standard equipment.

In 1985, the last year of production, the X-body Skylark was available only as a four-door sedan in Custom or Limited trim, as the two-door coupe was replaced by Buick's new Somerset Regal coupe, built on GM's new N-body platform, shared with Pontiac's revived Grand Am and the new Oldsmobile Calais. For 1985 the grille was again redesigned, as was the rear. The taillights were wider and the license plate was moved down to the bumper, while a "Buick" plate appeared where the license plate had been on previous model years.

Production Figures

Buick Skylark Production Figures
	Coupe	Sedan	Yearly Totals
1980	97,766	167,888	265,654
1981	76,595	185,733	262,328
1982	34,729	109,831	144,560
1983	22,023	82,624	104,647
1984	20,921	90,290	111,211
1985	-	93,157	93,157
Total	252,034	729,523	981,557

=== Engines ===
- 1980–1985 Tech-4, 2.5 L (151 cu in; 2,471 cc) I4, supplied by Pontiac
- 1980–1985 LE2, 2.8 L (173 cu in; 2,837 cc) V6, supplied by Chevrolet
- 1982–1985 LH7, 2.8 L (173 cu in; 2,837 cc) V6, supplied by Chevrolet

== Sixth generation (1985–1991) ==
Sixth generation
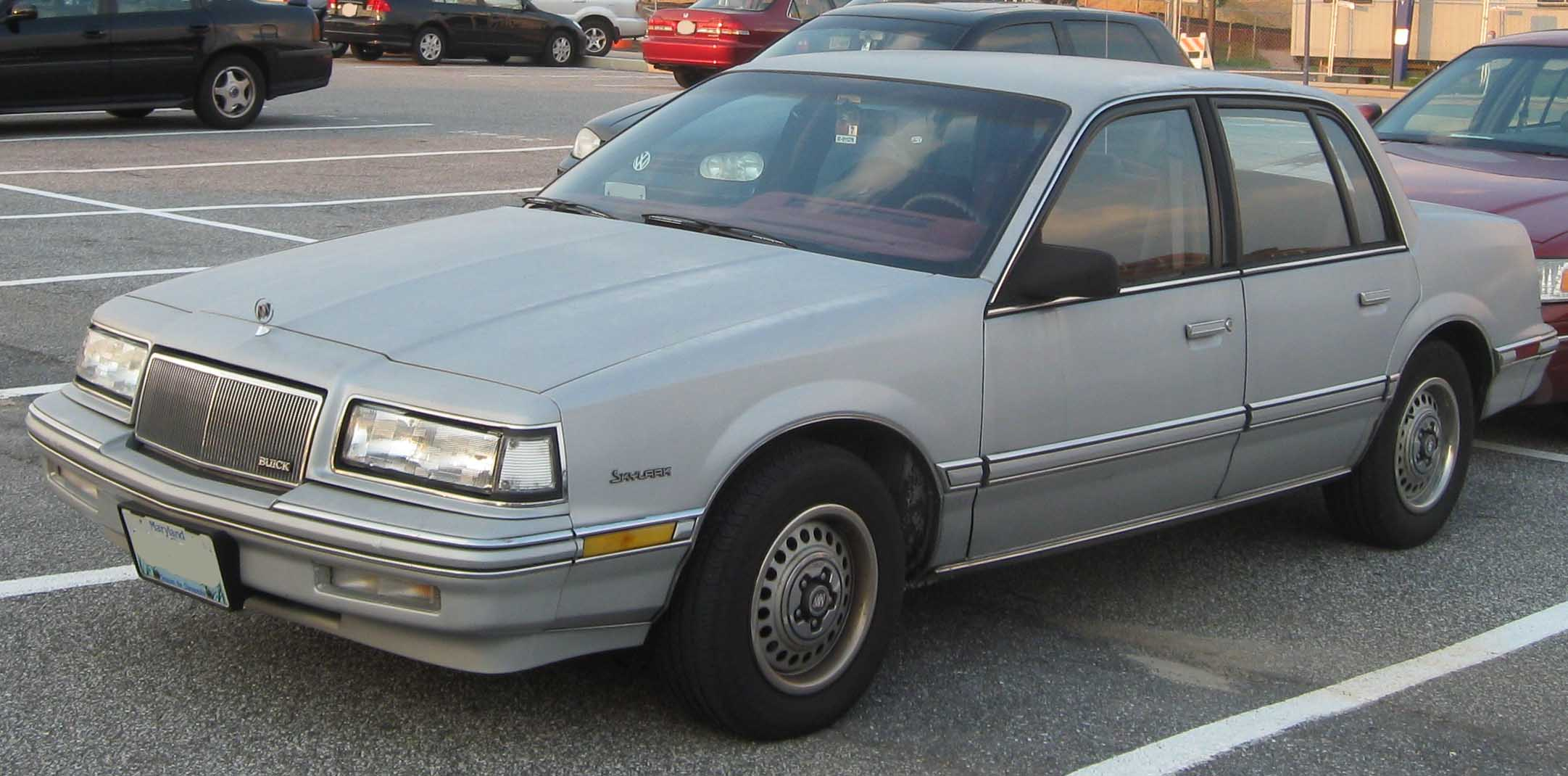
- 1986–1991 Skylark

Overview
- Also called: Buick Somerset
- Model years: 1985–1991
- Assembly: United States: Lansing, Michigan (Lansing Car Assembly)

Body and chassis
- Class: Compact
- Body style: 2-door coupe; 4-door sedan
- Layout: Transverse front-engine, front-wheel drive
- Platform: N-body
- Related: Oldsmobile Cutlass Calais; Pontiac Grand Am

Powertrain
- Engine: 2.3 L LD2 I4; 2.5 L L68 I4; 3.0 L LN7 V6; 3.3 L LG7 V6
- Transmission: 3-speed THM125 automatic; 5-speed Isuzu manual

Dimensions
- Wheelbase: 103.4 in (2,626 mm)
- Length: 180.0 in (4,572 mm)
- Width: 66.6 in (1,692 mm) (1986–88); 66.7 in (1,694 mm) (1989–1991)
- Height: 52.2 in (1,326 mm)

For the 1985 model year, the two-door Skylark coupe was replaced by the Somerset Regal, built on the Oldsmobile-developed N-body platform. The "Somerset" name had previously been used as a trim package on the Regal. This generation of compact Buicks featured a more upscale and aerodynamic design than its predecessor, incorporating the long-hood/short-deck look popular at the time. The Pontiac-produced Iron Duke engine continued from the Skylark, but an Isuzu-sourced five-speed manual transmission replaced the four-speed as standard equipment. A new 3.0 L (181 cu in) multi-port fuel-injected Buick V6, generating 125 hp (93 kW) at 4900 rpm, replaced the Chevrolet-designed 2.8 L V6 and was paired only with a three-speed automatic transmission. The Somerset featured an all-digital instrument cluster.

For 1986, the Skylark sedan was shifted to the N platform and redesigned to match its coupe stablemate, which dropped the "Regal" suffix from its same. It remained available in either Custom or Limited trim levels, and gained the powertrain options from the Somerset but retained conventional analog gauges.

Beginning with the 1987 model year, the four-door Skylark was available as a sporty T-Type model installed with the 3.0 L LN7 V6 engine. In mid-model year, 1987 Skylark models had door-mounted automatic seat belts.

For 1988 models, the Somerset name was dropped and Buick's two-door N-body compact would share the Skylark nameplate with its four-door counterparts. A new engine option for 1988 models was the fuel-injected, Oldsmobile-designed 2.3 L DOHC Quad-4 4-cylinder engine that produced 150 hp (110 kW) at 5200 rpm. An S/E package for Custom models replaced the previous T-Type trim. On 1989 models, a fuel-injected 3.3 L V6 (160 hp at 5200 rpm) replaced the previous 3.0 L V6, which was also Buick-built. A new LE package become available on four-door sedans that featured a vinyl roof that covered part of the rear side windows. The three-speed automatic transaxle became standard for 1989. For 1990, a new base Skylark was added, moving the Custom model up to replace the Limited. The S/E package was replaced by a new Gran Sport two-door sedan, reviving a name that had not been connected with the Skylark for many years. The LE ("Luxury Edition") sedan would become a full-fledged model.

The 1991 Skylark was a continuation of the 1990 lineup, with virtually no change made to the outward appearance of the car. There were minor mechanical changes made to the Skylark's optional 3.3 L V6 power plant, including a one-piece rear main bearing seal to replace the rope type previously used, and a redesigned camshaft flange.

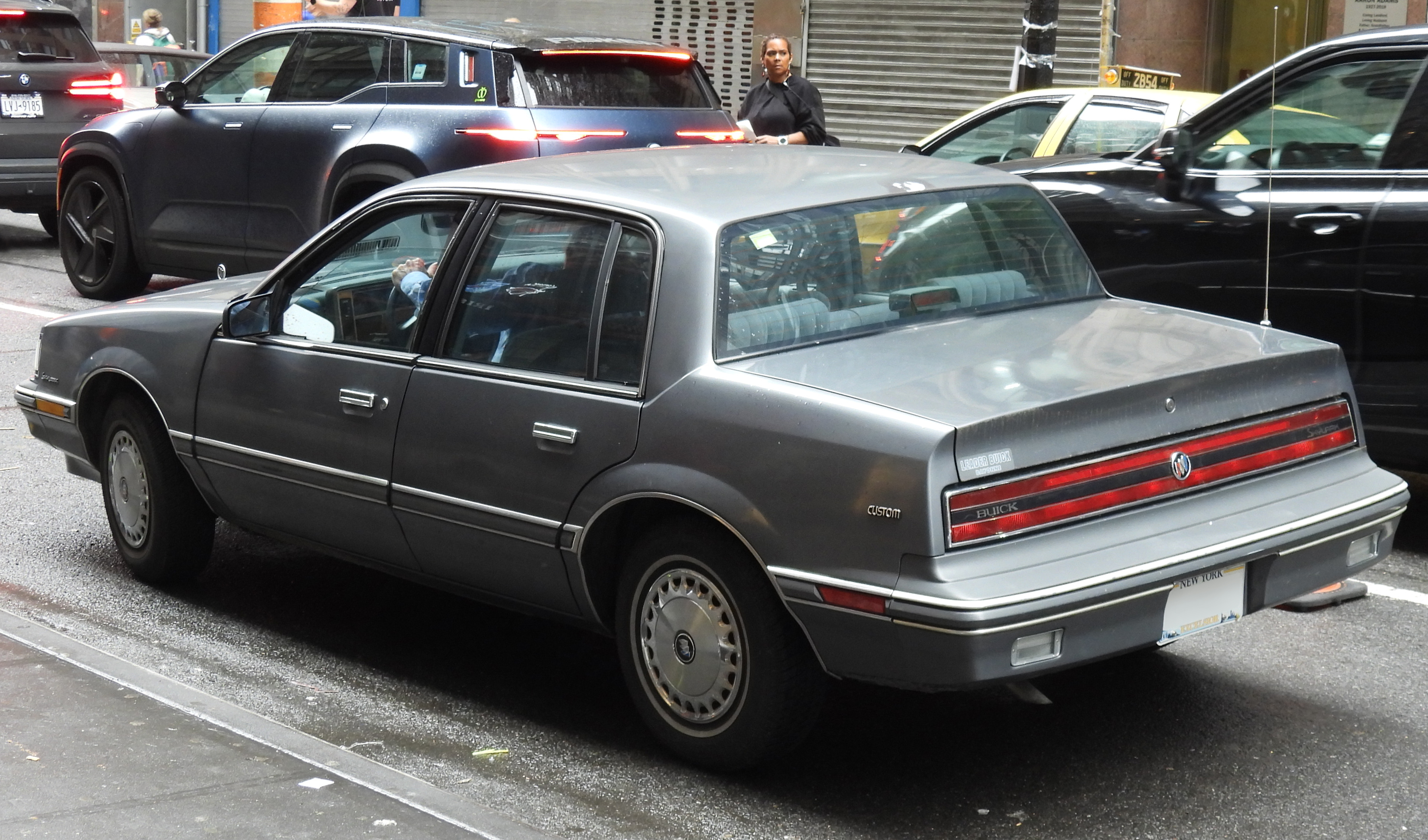
1989 Buick Skylark Custom sedan (rear)

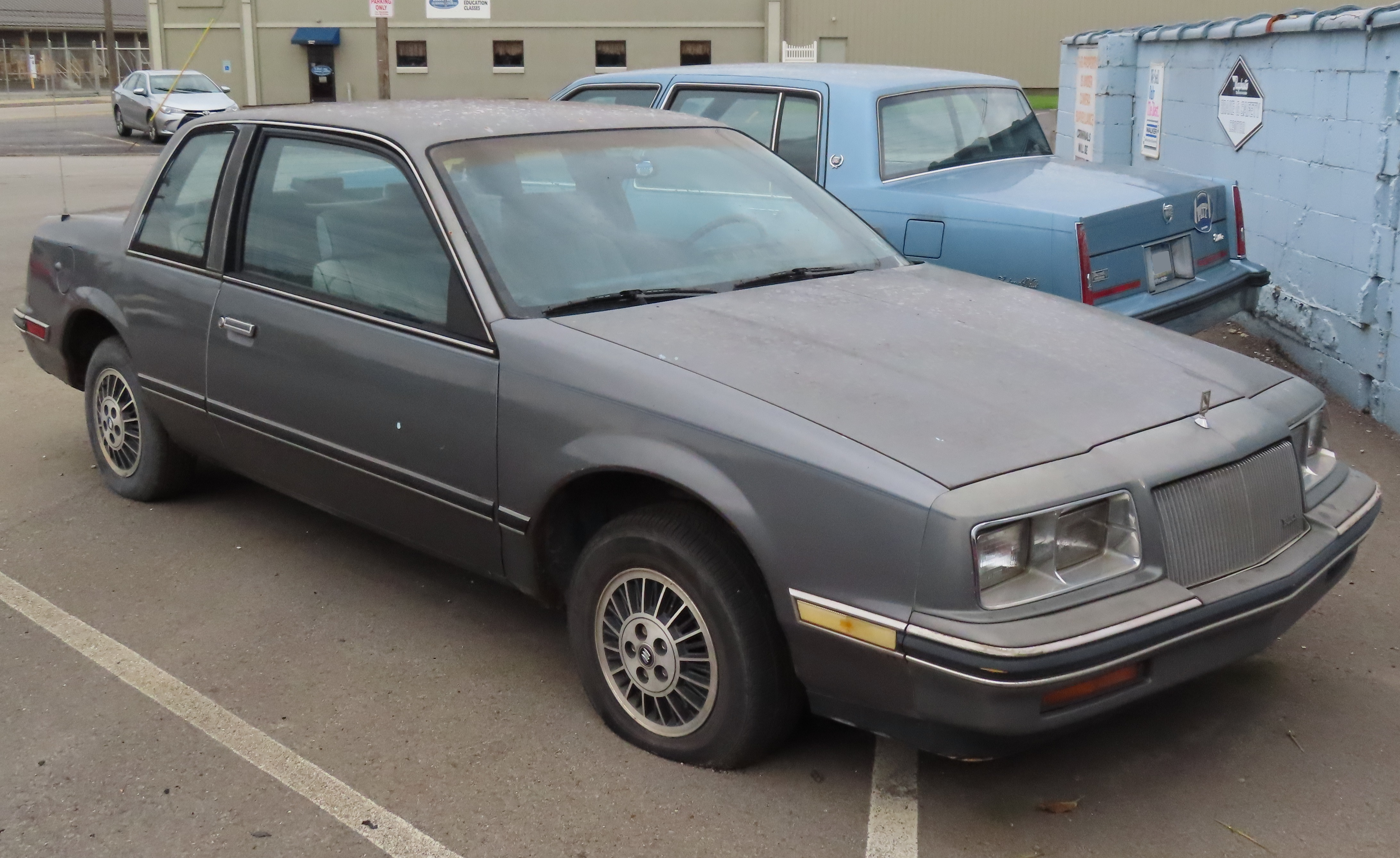
1986-1987 Buick Somerset coupe

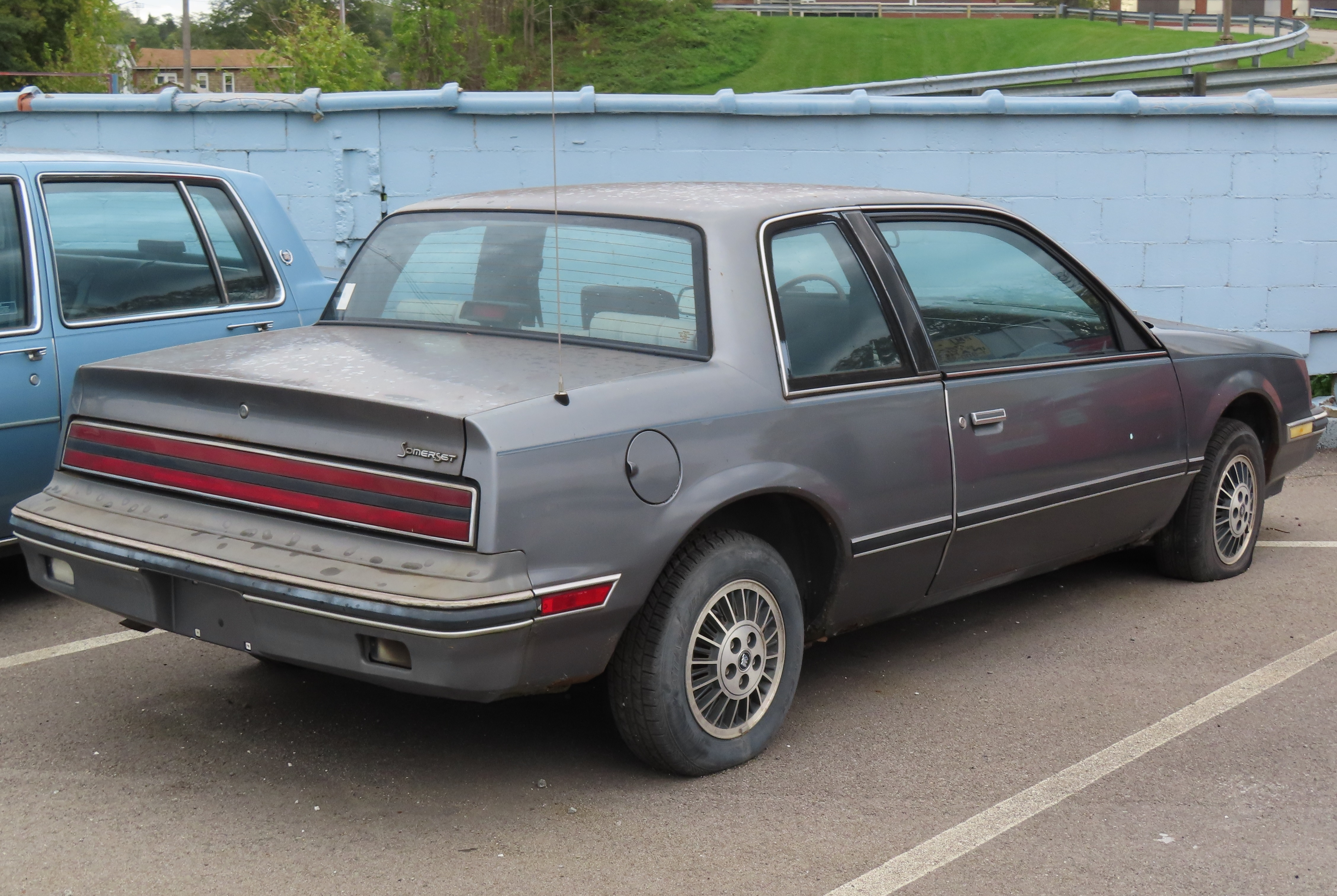
Somerset coupe (rear view)

Production Figures

Buick Skylark/Somerset Production Figures
	Coupe	Sedan	Yearly Total
1985	86,071	-	86,071
1986	75,620	62,235	137,855
1987	46,501	33,705	80,206
1988	24,536	30,256	54,792
1989	14,130	47,410	61,540
1990	11,375	74,193	85,568
1991	7,100	68,686	75,786
Total	265,333	409,642	674,975

=== Engines ===
- 1986–1991 2.5 L L68 I4, supplied by Pontiac
- 1988–1991 2.3 L LD2 I4, supplied by Oldsmobile
- 1986–1988 3.0 L LN7 V6
- 1989–1991 3.3 L LG7 V6

== Seventh generation (1992–1998) ==
Seventh generation
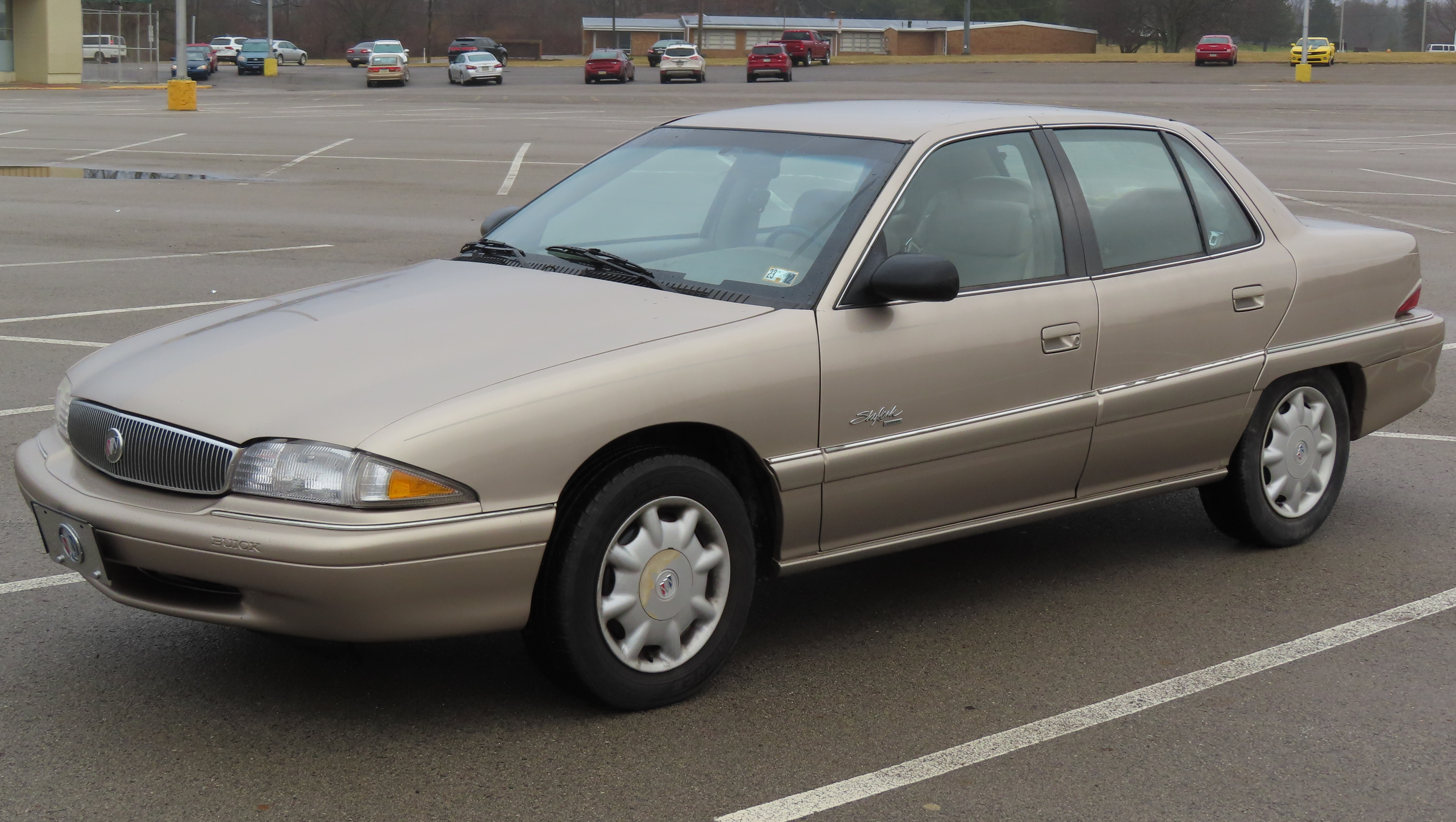
- 1996 Buick Skylark Limited Sedan (Facelift)

Overview
- Model years: 1992–1998
- Assembly: United States: Lansing, Michigan (Lansing Car Assembly)
- Designer: Wayne Kady

Body and chassis
- Class: Compact
- Body style: 2-door coupe; 4-door sedan
- Layout: Transverse front-engine, front-wheel drive
- Platform: N-body
- Related: Oldsmobile Achieva; Oldsmobile Cutlass; Pontiac Grand Am; Chevrolet Beretta; Chevrolet Corsica; Chevrolet Malibu

Powertrain
- Engine: 2.3 L L40 I4; 2.3 L LD2 I4; 2.4 L LD9 I4; 3.1 L L82 V6; 3.3 L LG7 V6
- Transmission: 3-speed 3T40 automatic; 4-speed 4T60-E automatic

Dimensions
- Wheelbase: 103.4 in (2,626 mm)
- Length: 189.1 in (4,803 mm) (1992–95); 188.4 in (4,785 mm) (1996–97 coupe); 188.5 in (4,788 mm) (1996–98 sedan)
- Width: 67.5 in (1,714 mm) (1992–93); 68.7 in (1,745 mm) (1994–95); 68.2 in (1,732 mm) (1996–98)
- Height: 53.2 in (1,351 mm) (1992–93); 53.3 in (1,354 mm) (1994–95); 53.5 in (1,359 mm) (1996–98)

Buick presented the Bolero concept in 1990, previewing numerous styling elements used in the 1992 Skylark, including its wedge-shape, chromed feature line rising along each body side and wrapping around the rear, along with a prominent pointed grille — reminiscent of 1930s Buick Special. The Skylark's bodwork achieved a 0.319 coefficient of drag, compared to 0.374 for the previous version. The pointed grille had been used by Buick during the mid-1960s.

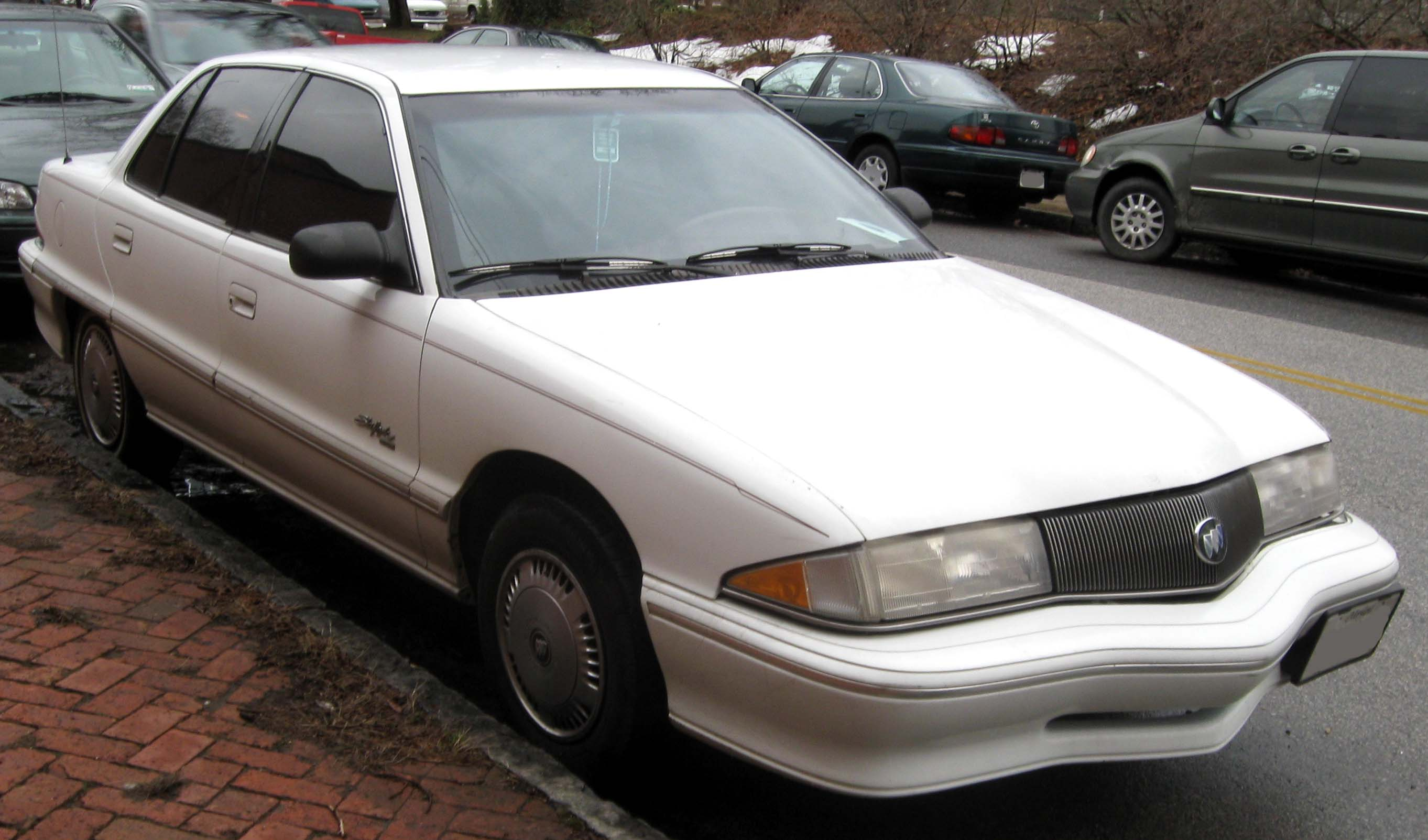
Pre-facelift (1992–1995)

It was initially offered in two- and four-door body styles and in base and Gran Sport versions. The base engine was the 2.3 L Quad OHC, which produced 120 hp (89 kW) at 5200 rpm. The optional 3.3 L V6 (standard on the GS) produced 160 hp (119 kW) at 5200 rpm. All Skylarks came with the three-speed automatic transaxle.

For the 1993 model year, the base model was replaced by Custom and Limited trims. For 1994, a new 3.1 L V6 (160 hp (120 kW) at 5200 rpm) replaced the previous 3.3 L V6 as standard on the GS and optional on the others. The Limited coupe was dropped for 1994, but returned for 1995.

Mechanical changes for the 1995 model year included the upgrading of the standard 2.3 L Quad 4 engine from a SOHC design to a DOHC design, increasing power to 150 hp (112 kW) at 6000 rpm. The three-speed automatic transaxle continued to be standard with the base four-cylinder engine, but a new four-speed automatic (electronically controlled 4T60-E) was optional with the 4-cylinder engine and standard with the V6.

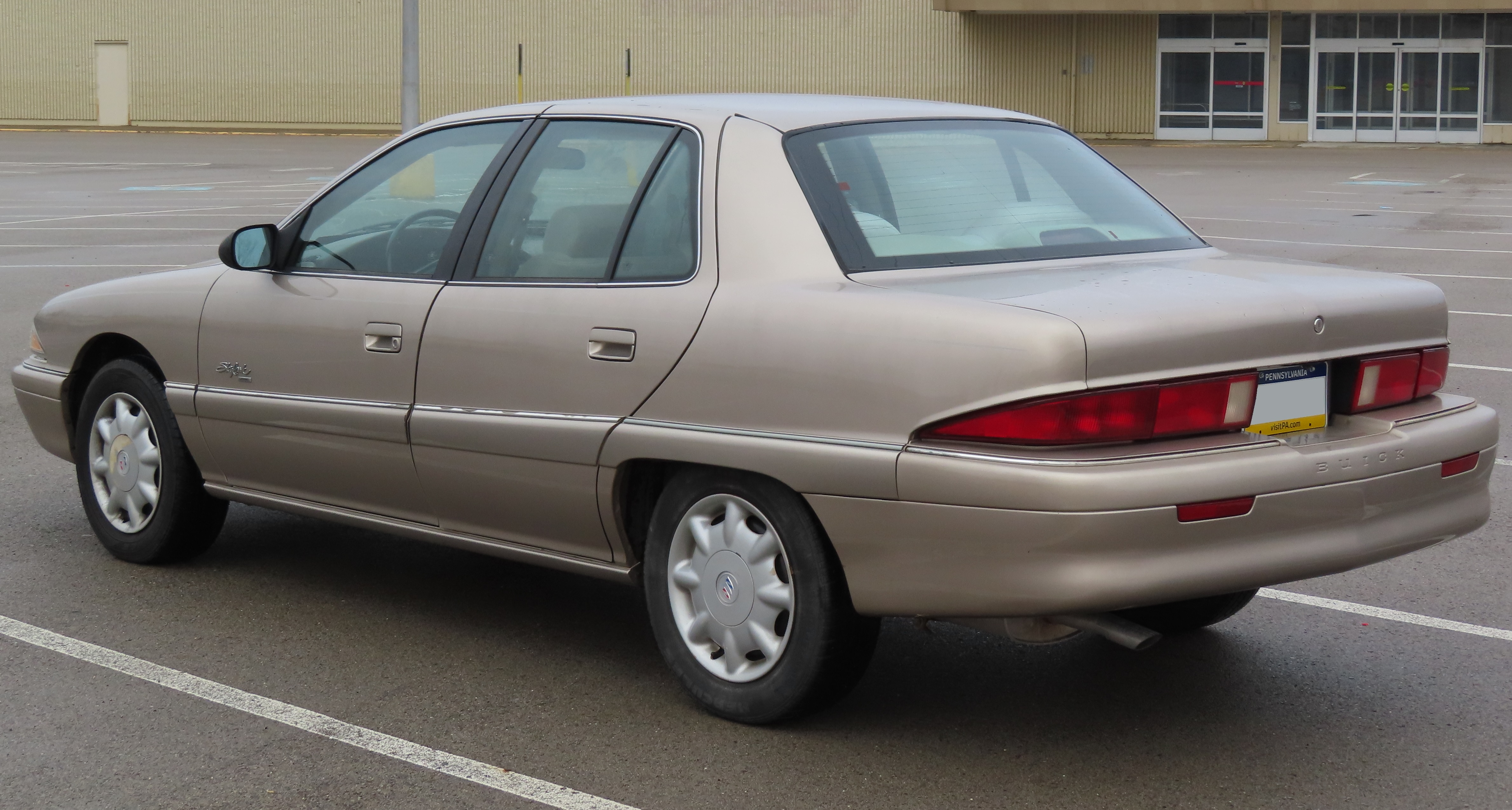
Rear view (1996 Skylark Limited Sedan)

Skylark received a facelift for the 1996 model year in the form of a more conventional-looking grille. The previous 2.3 L I4 was replaced by a new 2.4 L DOHC I4 that produced 150 hp (112 kW) at 6000 rpm. The previous three-speed automatic transaxle was discontinued and the four-speed automatic became standard on all Skylarks. An on-board diagnostic system (OBD II) was standard. Buick offered an "Olympic Gold" edition of the 1996 Skylark to commemorate the 100th anniversary of the Olympic Games (also available on Regal). It featured gold USA/5-ring badging on the fenders, gold "Skylark" badges, gold-accented wheel covers, and gold accent trim.

There were only minor changes to the lineup for the 1997 model year, which was the last year that it would be available to the public in showrooms. A single-model 1998 Skylark sedan was produced for fleet-only sales, mostly to auto rental companies. Most of these 1998 models, the last year that Buick used the Skylark name, were eventually resold to the general public as used cars. After the Skylark's discontinuation, Buick did not produce another compact car until 2012 Buick Verano.

Production ended on December 4, 1997.

The Skylark production line in Lansing was retooled to build the 2000–2003 Chevrolet Malibu.

Production Figures:

Buick Skylark Production Figures
	Coupe	Sedan	Yearly Total
1992	11,639	44,061	55,700
1993	14,498	41,914	56,412
1994	9,558	47,000	56,558
1995	9,725	43,707	53,432
1996	6,783	35,089	41,872
1997	4,041	53,683	57,724
1998	*	*	*

*Production figures for 1998 were not provided

=== Engines ===
Years	Engine
1992–1994	2.3 L Oldsmobile L40 I4
1995	2.3 L Oldsmobile LD2 I4
1996–1998	2.4 L Oldsmobile LD9 I4
1992–1993	3.3 L Buick LG7 V6
1994–1998	3.1 L Chevrolet L82 V6
