= Buick Skyhawk =

American automobile built by Buick from 1974 to 1989

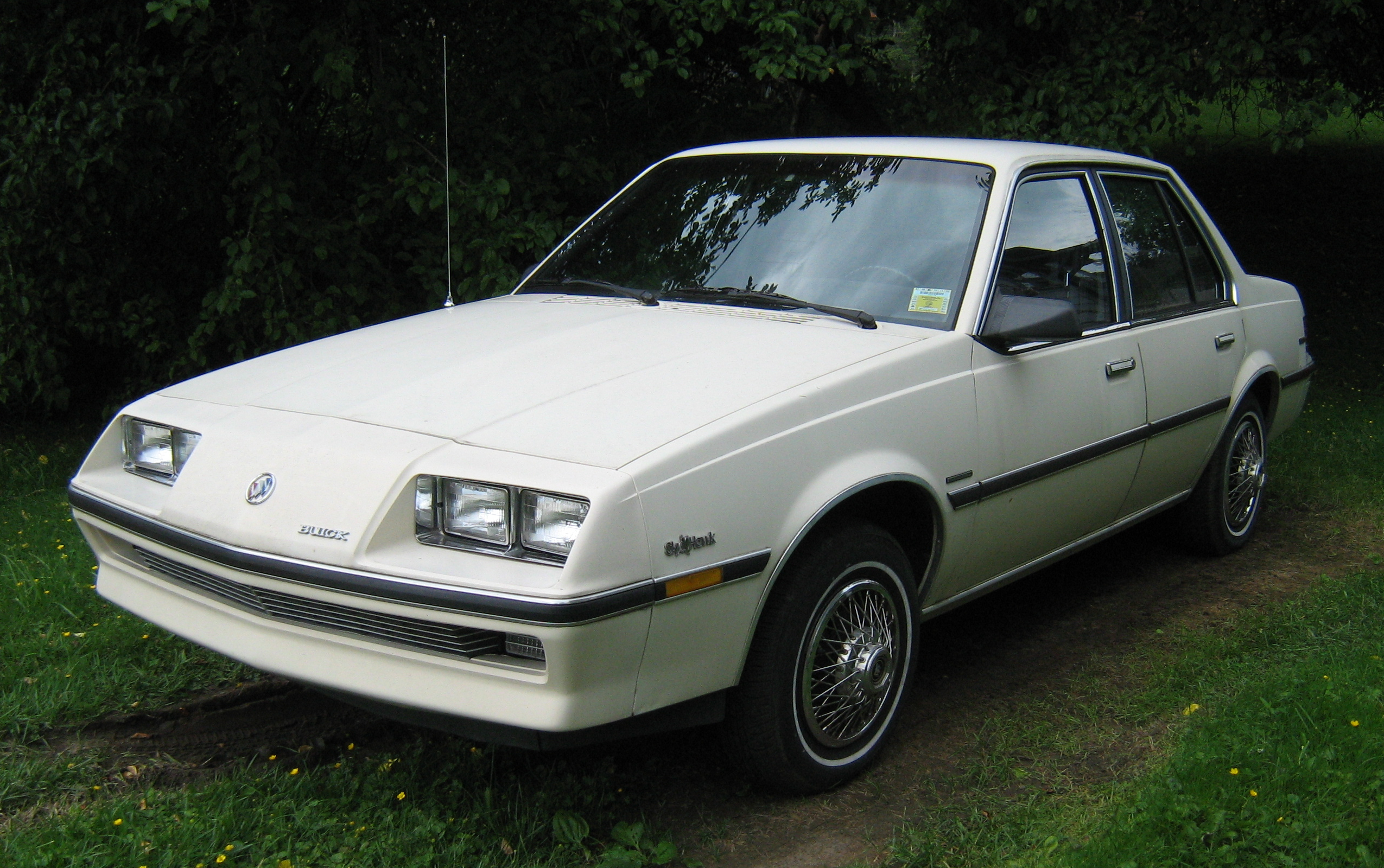
- 1986 Buick Skyhawk Custom 4-door sedan

Overview
- Manufacturer: Buick (General Motors)
- Production: 1974–1989
- Model years: 1975–1980; 1982–1989

Body and chassis
- Class: Subcompact (1975–1980) compact (1982–1989)

The Buick Skyhawk is an automobile produced by Buick in two generations for the 1975 through 1989 model years.

The first generation (1975–1980) were two-door hatchbacks using the subcompact, rear-wheel drive H-body platform, a badge engineered entry-level version of the Chevrolet Monza, which was based on the Chevrolet Vega while the only engine available was a V6.

Introducing a subcompact was a new approach for Buick and GM, with a similar approach from Oldsmobile with the Starfire hatchback.

The second generation (1982–1989) Skyhawks were built on the compact, front-wheel drive J-car platform that was available in four body styles: two-door sedan and hatchback, as well as four-door sedan and station wagon — manufactured alongside its rebadged variants, the Chevrolet Cavalier, Cadillac Cimarron, Oldsmobile Firenza, and Pontiac J2000/2000/Sunbird at GM's South Gate Assembly and Janesville Assembly plants.

== First generation (1975–1980) ==
Skyhawk (Series 4H)
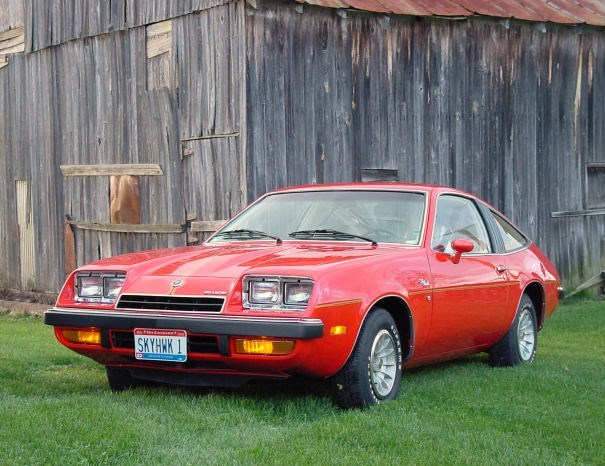
- 1975 Buick Skyhawk hatchback coupe

Overview
- Production: 1974–1979
- Model years: 1975–1980
- Assembly: Lordstown, Ohio, U.S. (Lordstown Assembly); South Gate, California, U.S. (South Gate Assembly); Sainte-Thérèse, Quebec, Canada (Sainte-Thérèse Assembly)

Body and chassis
- Class: Subcompact
- Body style: 2-door hatchback
- Layout: FR layout
- Platform: H-body
- Related: Chevrolet Monza; Pontiac Sunbird; Oldsmobile Starfire

Powertrain
- Engine: 3.8 L 231/LD5 V6
- Transmission: 4-speed Saginaw or Muncie manual 5-speed T-50 manual 3-speed THM-200 automatic 3-speed THM-250 automatic

Dimensions
- Wheelbase: 97.0 in (2,464 mm)
- Length: 179.3 in (4,554 mm) (2+2)
- Width: 65.4 in (1,661 mm)
- Height: 50.2 in (1,275 mm) (2+2)
- Curb weight: 2,800 lb (1,270 kg)

The "first generation" Buick Skyhawk is a subcompact, four passenger, hatchback automobile that was introduced September 1974, and produced for the 1975 through 1980 model years. It was based on the Chevrolet Vega, and shares its wheelbase and width. The Skyhawk was produced with H-body variants Chevrolet Monza, Oldsmobile Starfire, and Pontiac Sunbird. In North America, it competed with other small sporty cars, such as the Toyota Celica, Datsun 200SX, VW Scirocco, Mercury Capri, and the Ford Mustang II. The Buick Skyhawk was the smallest car to wear the Buick badge in more than 60 years.

=== Overview ===
The Skyhawk has a 97.0-inch (2,460 mm) wheelbase and a 65.4-inch (1,660 mm) width. The Skyhawk, Chevrolet Monza, and Oldsmobile Starfire were among the first vehicles to adopt the newly approved quad rectangular headlamps. The body style is noted for having a resemblance to the Ferrari 365 GTC/4. The Skyhawk is a rear-wheel drive vehicle with a live rear axle design. Throughout its production, the H-body Skyhawk was offered only with the Buick-designed 3.8 liter (231 cid) V6 engine, using a two-barrel carburetor that generated 110 hp (82 kW) at 4000 rpm in comparison to its siblings which offered a variety of engines. A four-speed manual transmission was standard; with a three-speed automatic offered as an option. The front suspension is short and long control arms with coil springs, and anti-roll bar; the rear suspension is a torque-arm design with coil springs and an anti-roll bar. Its design was later incorporated into GM's third- and fourth-generation F-bodied (Camaro and Firebird). Variable-ratio power steering was standard and of a recirculating ball design. The brake system features standard power assist including front disc brakes with solid rotors, and rear drum brakes.

=== Changes ===
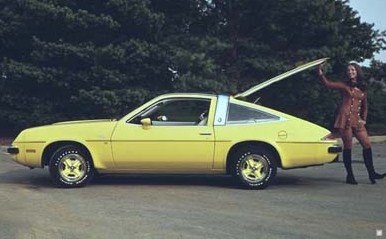
1976 Buick Skyhawk hatchback coupe

Following the introduction of the Skyhawk, in mid-1975, it was joined by a lower-priced and less well-equipped Skyhawk S.

In 1976, a five-speed manual transmission became available as an option. Starting with the 1976 models, the front brake rotors were of the vented type. Another new option was the Astroroof, which was a large, heavily tinted, overhead glass roof combined with a wide aluminum band that extended from one B-pillar across the roof to the opposite B-pillar. In 1977, a conventional sliding sunroof became optional and also could be ordered with the aluminum band.

To commemorate the Bicentennial of the United States, the standard colors available on all Buicks were Judicial Black, Liberty White, Pewter Gray, Potomac Blue, Continental Blue, Concord Green, Constitution Green, Mount Vernon Cream, Buckskin Tan, Musket Brown, Boston Red and Independence Red, with specially available colors on select models Congressional Cream, Revere Red, Colonial Yellow and Firecracker Orange.

For the 1979 model year, the Skyhawk received a facelift that incorporated single rectangular headlamps, replacing the previous dual rectangular headlamps that all models had used. A new option was the "Road Hawk" package that included a Rallye ride and handling package consisting of larger front and rear stabilizer bars, larger tires, and special interior and exterior trim. There was also a "Skyhawk Designers' Accent Edition" that was primarily an exterior trim package available in bright yellow or red with black trim.

There were few changes for 1980, the last model year for the GM H-body platform, most notably the discontinuance of the five-speed manual transmission as an option and revisions to the interior decor. Only the four-speed manual and three-speed automatic transmissions were offered for 1980.

The Skyhawk and Starfire failed to achieve the sales success of the Monza and Sunbird possibly because small sporty coupes seemed out-of-place in a Buick or Oldsmobile showroom. They were discontinued on December 21, 1979, to allow for more production of Monza and Sunbird hatchbacks.

A total of 125,311 H-body Skyhawks were produced in six model years.

See also

- General Motors H-platform
- Chevrolet Vega

== Second generation (1982–1989) ==
Skyhawk (Series 4J)
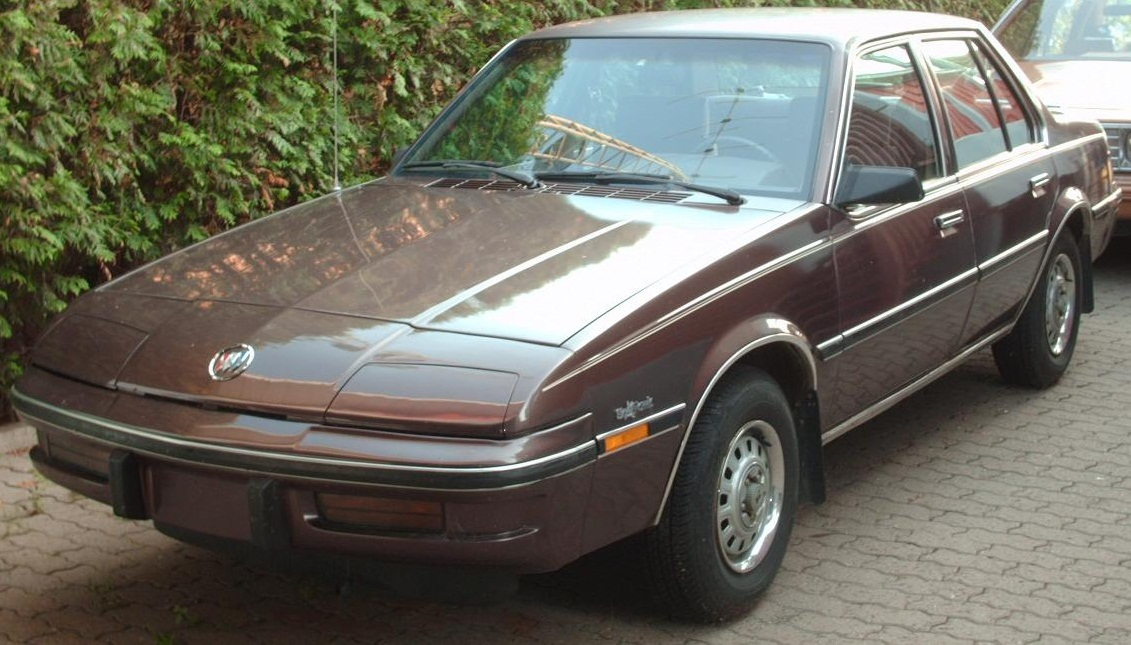
- 1987 Buick Skyhawk Limited 4-door sedan

Overview
- Production: 1981–1989
- Model years: 1982–1989
- Assembly: United States: Kansas City, Missouri (Leeds Assembly; 1982–1988); Janesville, Wisconsin (Janesville Assembly; 1988–1989)

Body and chassis
- Class: Compact
- Body style: 2-door coupe 3-door hatchback 4-door sedan 4-door station wagon
- Layout: Transverse front-engine, front-wheel drive
- Platform: J-body
- Related: Cadillac Cimarron; Oldsmobile Firenza; Pontiac Sunbird; Chevrolet Cavalier

Powertrain
- Engine: 1,841 cc (112.3 cu in) L46 OHV I4; 1,796 cc (109.6 cu in) LH8 SOHC I4; 1,796 cc (109.6 cu in) LA5 turbo SOHC I4; 1,991 cc (121.5 cu in) LQ5/LL8 OHV I4; 1,998 cc (121.9 cu in) LT2 SOHC I4; 1,998 cc (121.9 cu in) LT3 turbo SOHC I4
- Transmission: 4-speed Muncie M17 manual 5-speed Getrag 282 manual 3-speed Turbo-Hydramatic 125 C automatic

Dimensions
- Wheelbase: 101.2 in (2,570 mm)
- Length: 179.6 in (4,562 mm) (Sedan & coupe)
- Width: 66.3 in (1,684 mm); 1988–89 Sedan/Coupe/Wagon: 66.0 in (1,676 mm)
- Height: 52.3 in (1,328 mm) (Coupe)

The 1982–1989 front-wheel drive Skyhawk (J-body) debuted in February, at the 1982 Chicago Auto Show. The Skyhawk was originally available as a two-door and four-door sedan in both Custom and Limited trim packages. The standard engine was a corporate 1.8 liter "122" OHV carbureted four-cylinder (88 hp), with a Brazilian-built 1.8 liter overhead-cam TBI four (84 hp) as an option. A carbureted, 90 hp OHV two-liter also appeared soon after the Skyhawk went on sale, along with an optional five-speed manual. The 1982 Skyhawk Limited sedan was listed at $7,931 ($26,459 in 2025 dollars) before optional equipment. The suspension was shared with the front-wheel-drive Skylark and Century, which consisted of MacPherson struts, lower control arms, coil springs and a stabilizer bar for the front, and a torsion-beam rear axle, along with coil springs and rear stabilizer bars. The unique dashboard unit was shared only with the Oldsmobile Firenza.

The Skyhawk was an entry-level compact platform for a luxury brand, Buick, and was a refocused effort from the previous generation introduced. It followed many economic factors. The United States had entered into a recession, following the effects of the 1970s energy crisis, and the United States Congress having passed the Energy Policy and Conservation Act, establishing Corporate Average Fuel Economy standards. Sales of large luxury sedans declined in favor of smaller, fuel efficient products with luxury features installed. Smaller luxury vehicles were imported into North America from both Europe and Japan, and GM responded with a small luxury sedan that included power windows, power adjustable drivers seat, air conditioning, upgraded stereo system, available automatic transmission, velour cloth interiors and other appearance features. The station wagon was available with 60/40 split folding second row seat to accommodate passengers and cargo.

For 1983, the Chevrolet-built OHV 1.8 was replaced by a Chevrolet-built OHV 2.0 with 86 hp. A four-door station wagon was also introduced, Buick's first front-wheel drive wagon. The next year there was a minor facelift, with bigger cooling openings and larger bumper rub strips. Shortly after the introduction of the '84s, a turbocharged MPFI version of the Brazilian 1.8 became available on the T-Type model, offering 150 hp (112 kW) and 150 lb⋅ft (203 N⋅m) of torque and the performance oriented Gran Touring suspension, provided by a Garrett T25 turbocharger and shared with the Pontiac Sunbird GT, but was only offered in the two-door coupe or hatchback, and the turbo T-Type was not available with the five-speed manual. The turbocharged engine was optional on the T-Type trim package, and was listed at $800 ($2,479 in 2025 dollars). The Skyhawk set a sales record in 1984 with 134,076 built. There was not much change for 1985, but for 1986 a new two-door hatchback was added, in "Sport" or T-Type trim. Also, the 2.0 now had 88 hp.

The 1.8-liter engines were replaced by two SOHC multi-port injected 2.0 liter versions for 1987, one naturally aspirated (96 hp/71 kW) and one 165 hp (123 kW) turbocharged version known as RPO LT3. The OHV two-liter remained, still with 88 hp. For 1988, only Skyhawk Sports remained, and the hatchback was discontinued. There was also a "Sport S/E" two-door coupe. The OHV and turbocharged engines were no longer available.

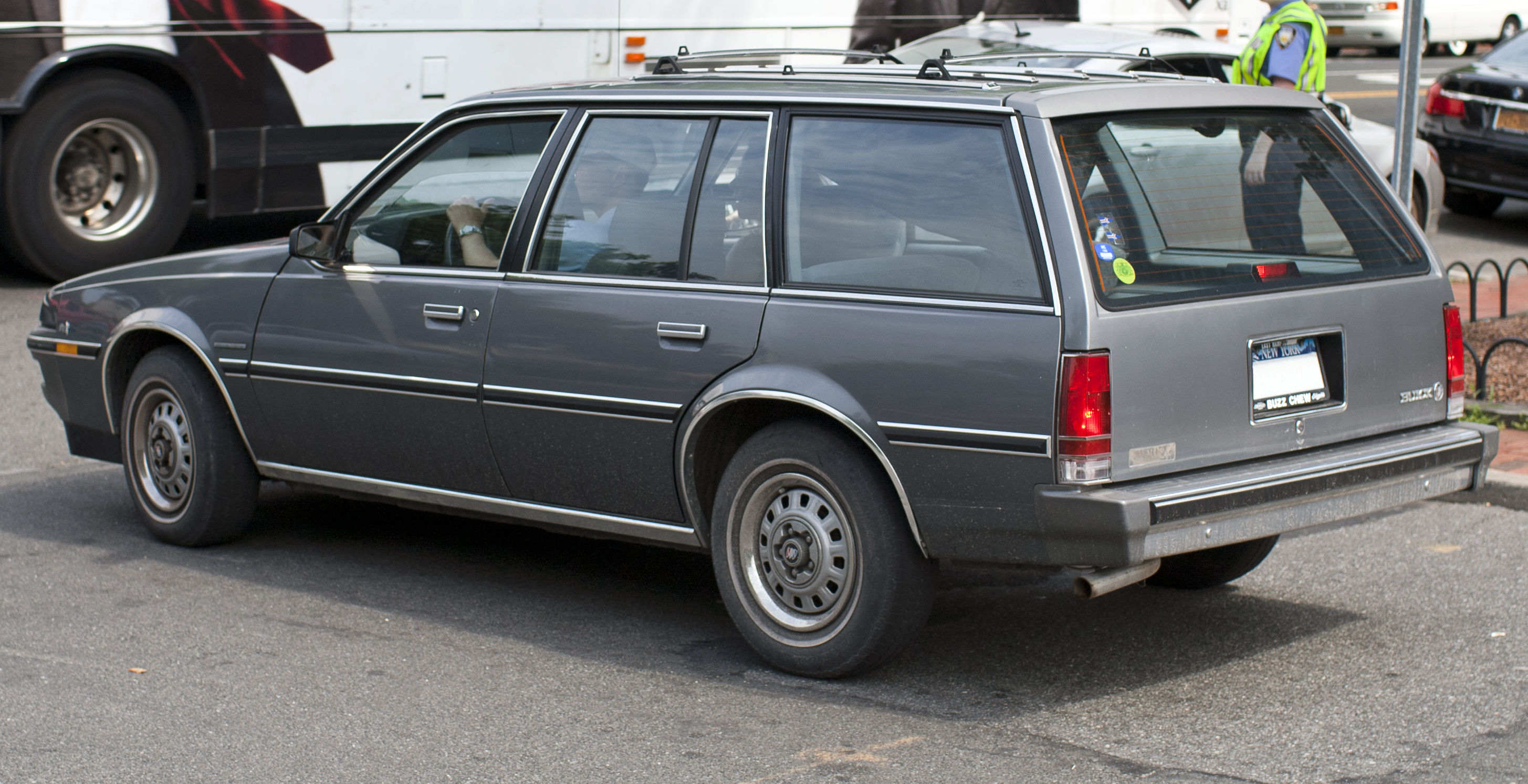
Facelifted Skyhawk station wagon

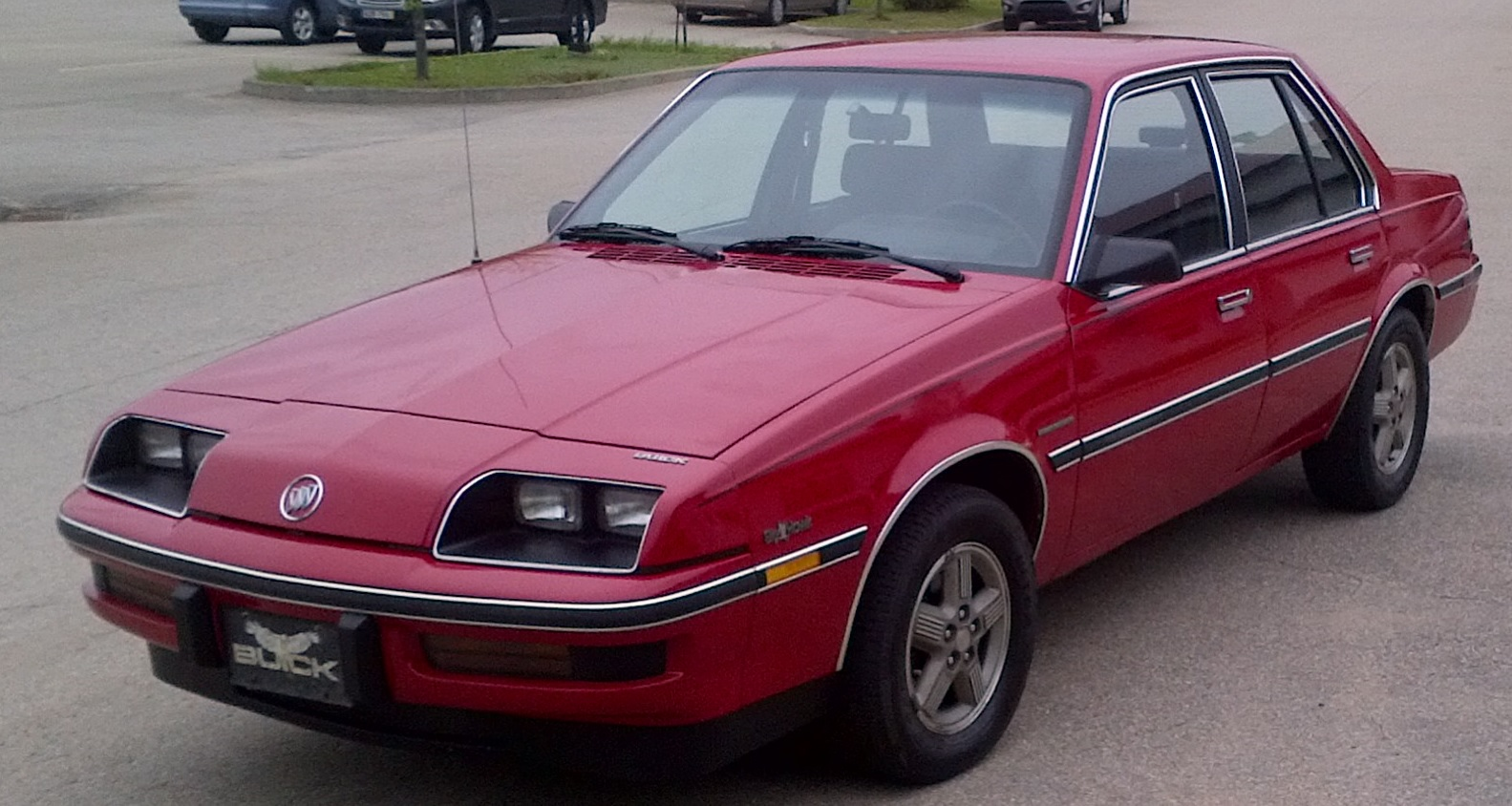
1987 Buick Skyhawk Custom sedan

Starting in 1986 the front facia was updated with a more rounded appearance, and the T-Type and Limited coupes, sedans, station wagons and hatchbacks received headlight covers that concealed dual sealed beam halogen headlights that retracted underneath the headlights, while the base model had exposed headlights.

1989 was to be the last year of the Skyhawk, but nonetheless the car received updates such as standard electronic fuel injection, better acoustical insulation and body colored door and window frames on the station wagon. The only engine was the Chevrolet OHV two-liter, now with 90 hp. A total of 23,366 of the 1989s were built, for a total of 529,564 second generation Skyhawks.

The Skyhawk, along with the variant Oldsmobile Firenza, were built in Leeds, next of Kansas City, Missouri from 1982 through 1988. 1988 was the last year of Oldsmobile Firenza production and Leeds Assembly was then closed. For 1989, GM moved Skyhawk production to its Janesville, Wisconsin, assembly plant. Production of the Skyhawk ceased after the 1989 model year. The Chevrolet Cavalier was also produced at Leeds for some of these model years.

The Skyhawk was the last Buick vehicle to offer a manual transmission option, until the introduction of the Opel Insignia-based 2011 Buick Regal Turbo.

Production figures:

Buick Skyhawk Production Figures
	Coupe	Sedan	Wagon	Hatchback	Yearly Total
1982	25,378	22,540	-	-	47,918
1983	32,652	19,847	10,653	-	63,152
1984	86,077	45,648	13,668	-	145,393
1985	49,325	27,906	5,285	-	82,516
1986	45,884	29,959	6,079	9,499	91,421
1987	21,370	17,978	3,559	3,757	46,664
1988	13,156	14,271	1,707	-	29,134
1989	7,837	13,841	1,688	-	23,366
Total	281,679	191,990	42,639	13,256	529,564

=== Engines ===
- 1982: 1.8 L L46 carbureted OHV I4
- 1982–1986: 1.8 L LH8 TBI SOHC I4
- 1983–1986: 2.0 L LQ5 TBI OHV I4
- 1984–1986: 1.8 L LA5 turbocharged MPFI SOHC I4, 150 hp
- 1987–1988: 2.0 L LT2 TBI SOHC I4
- 1987: 2.0 L LT3 turbocharged MPFI SOHC I4, 165 hp
- 1987, 1989: 2.0 L LL8 TBI OHV I4
