= Oldsmobile Firenza =

Oldsmobile Firenza (Series 3J)
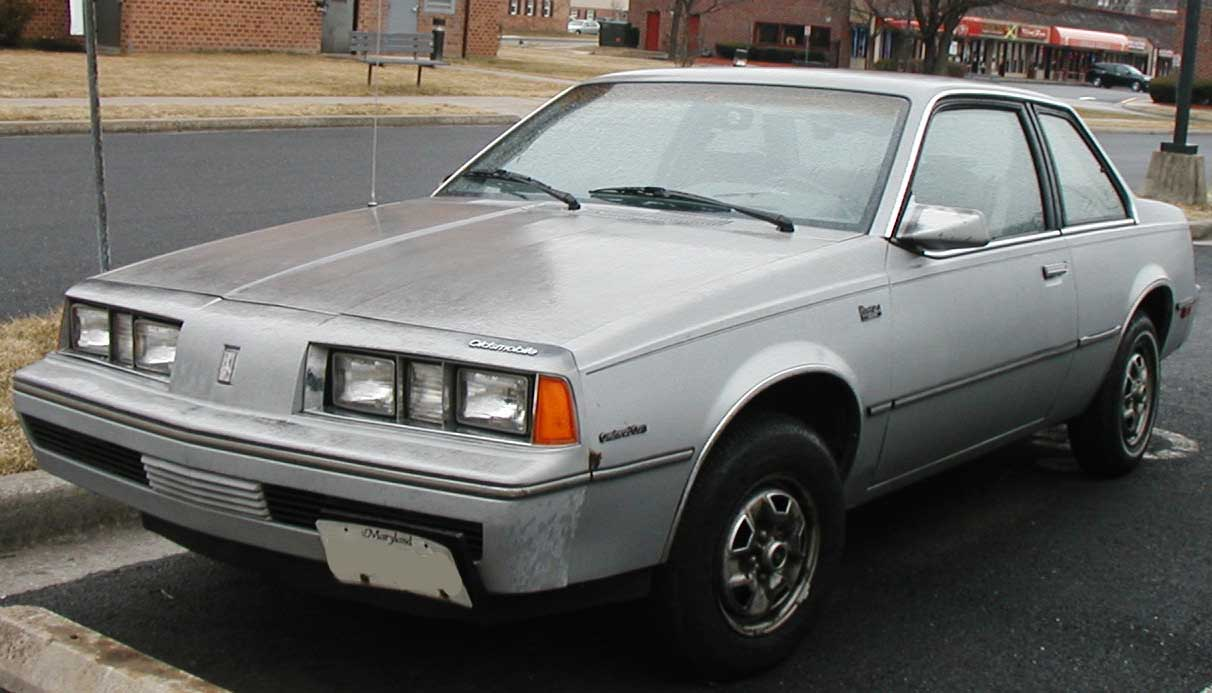

Overview
- Manufacturer: Oldsmobile (General Motors)
- Production: 1982–1988
- Model years: 1982–1988
- Assembly: Leeds, Missouri (Leeds Assembly)

Body and chassis
- Class: Compact car
- Body style: 2-door coupé 2-door hatchback 4-door sedan 4-door station wagon
- Layout: Transverse front-engine, front-wheel drive
- Platform: J-body
- Related: Cadillac Cimarron; Buick Skyhawk; Pontiac Sunbird; Chevrolet Cavalier

Powertrain
- Engine: 1,841 cc (112.3 cu in) OHV L46 I4; 1,796 cc (109.6 cu in) SOHC LH8 I4; 1,991 cc (121.5 cu in) OHV LQ5 I4; 1,991 cc (121.5 cu in) OHV LL8 I4; 1,998 cc (121.9 cu in) SOHC LT2 I4; 2,837 cc (173.1 cu in) LB6 V6
- Transmission: 4-speed Muncie M17 manual 5-speed Getrag 282 manual 3-speed Turbo-Hydramatic 125 C automatic

Dimensions
- Wheelbase: 101.2 in (2,570 mm)
- Length: 169.9 in (4,315 mm) (hatchback); 171.9 in (4,366 mm) (sedan); 179 in (4,547 mm) (wagon)
- Width: 65.0 in (1,651 mm)
- Height: 52.3 in (1,328 mm) (hatchback); 53.8 in (1,367 mm) (sedan); 54.4 in (1,382 mm) (wagon)
- Curb weight: 2343-2604lb (1063-1181kg)

Chronology
- Predecessor: Oldsmobile Starfire

The Oldsmobile Firenza was a compact car which was produced by Oldsmobile from 1982 to 1988. It was based on the front-wheel drive GM J platform, which was shared with the Buick Skyhawk, Cadillac Cimarron, Chevrolet Cavalier and Pontiac Sunbird. It was not based on the European market Vauxhall Firenza, but on the same platform as the Vauxhall Cavalier Mk 2 / Opel Ascona C. The Firenza name was previously used as a performance package on the previous generation Oldsmobile Starfire hatchback.

== Overview ==
The all-new Firenza was introduced in March 1982, as a replacement for the departed rear-wheel drive Starfire. Initially available as a two-door hatchback and four-door sedan, the lineup was expanded to include a 4-door "Cruiser" wagon in 1983, and a two-door notchback coupe in 1986. The name "Cruiser" was applied to all Oldsmobile station wagons at the time; this included the mid-sized Cutlass Cruiser and full-size Custom Cruiser. The Firenza was positioned as Oldsmobile's entry-level compact car, priced below the slightly larger Omega and later Calais/Cutlass Calais. Despite this, the Firenza could be equipped with premium options such as power windows, power locks, and 14-inch alloy wheels. The 1982 Firenza LX sedan was listed for $8,080 ($26,957 in 2025 dollars). It is named for the Italian translation of the city of Florence.

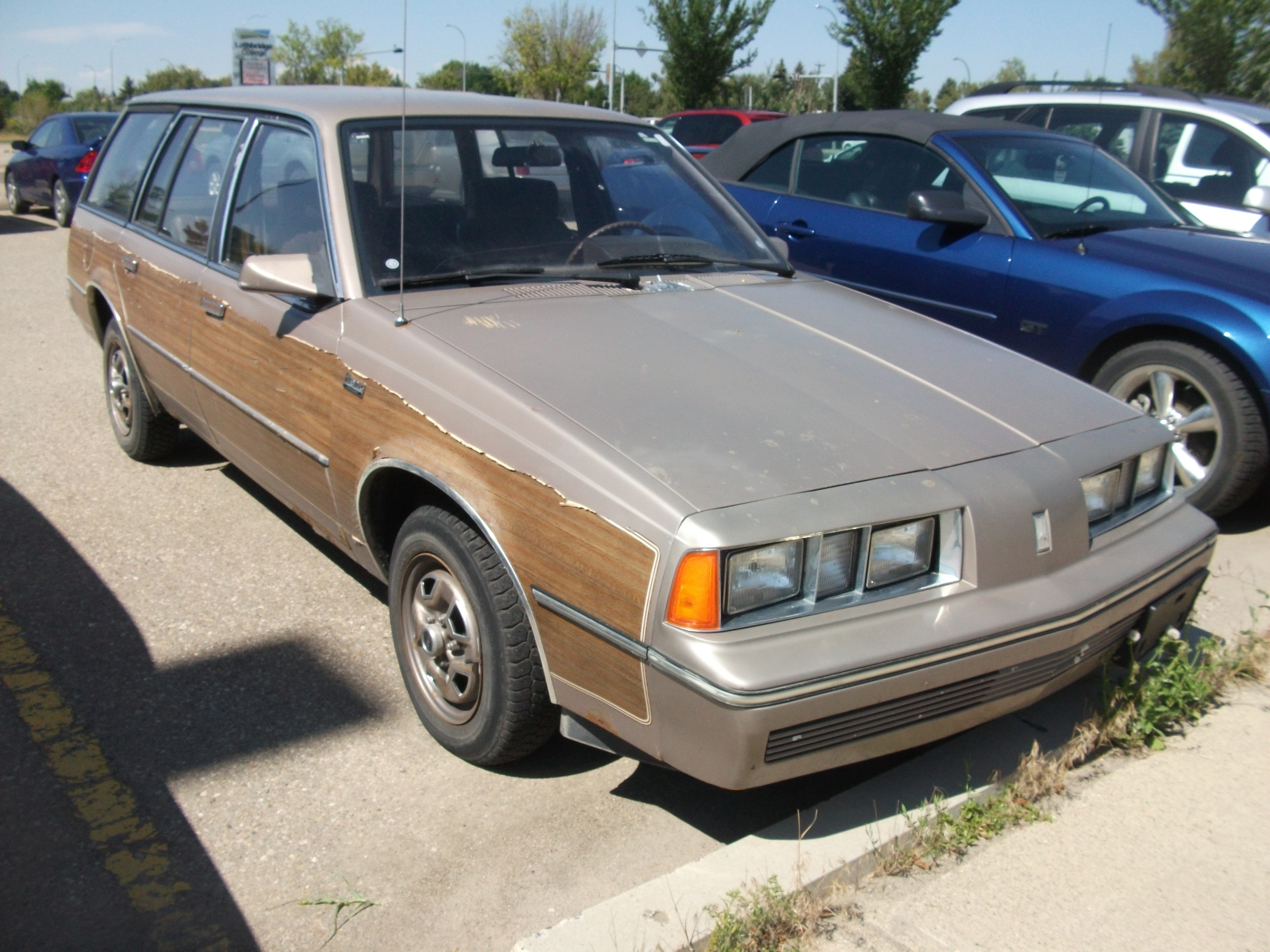
1984 Firenza Cruiser

As a badge engineered, variant of the GM J-car platform, the Firenza received its own front and rear-end styling. The upper portion of the Firenza front end featured quad rectangular headlights separated by signal lights in recessed housings, with a sloped body-color panel between the headlights. Grille inserts with vertical slats were located below the headlights in the front bumper fascia. The rear fascia of all but the wagon featured nearly square taillights with a slight wraparound at the outboard ends of the upper rear panel, while the wagon featured vertically-oriented rectangular taillights (as did the other J-body wagons). The Firenza dashboard assembly was shared only with the Buick Skyhawk, while the Chevrolet Cavalier, Pontiac Sunbird, and Cadillac Cimarron shared a markedly different dashboard assembly. The suspension was shared with the front-wheel-drive Omega and Cutlass Ciera, which consisted of MacPherson struts, lower control arms, coil springs and a stabilizer bar for the front, and a torsion-beam rear axle, along with coil springs and rear stabilizer bars.

The Firenza was launched with a 1.8-liter OHV inline four-cylinder engine as the sole powerplant, but a Brazilian-built overhead-cam 1.8-liter engine was added during the model year. The displacement of the OHV engine was increased to 2 liters for 1983. Oldsmobile did not utilize a turbocharger on these engines, while Buick and Pontiac offered a turbocharger on the overhead-cam engine. Wraparound amber turn signal lights were added immediately outboard of the headlights for 1984, while the grille insert was changed to a full-width unit with horizontal slats. In 1985, the 2.8 L LB6 V6 was added as an option with the GT package. The displacement of the overhead-cam engine increased to 2 liters in 1987.

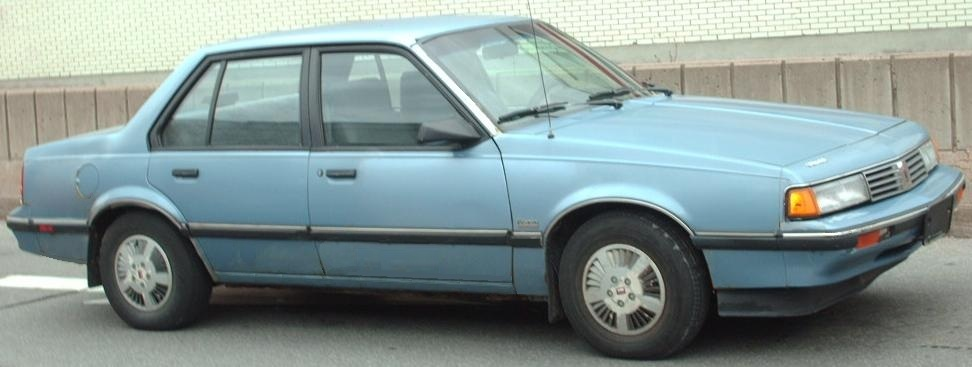
1988 Firenza sedan

For the Firenza's last model year in 1988, it received a chromed horizontal bar grille between new aerodynamic composite headlamps and new tail lights, styled similar to the Cutlass Ciera. Also for the Firenza's final year, the hatchback was dropped along with the V6 and the overhead-cam engine, leaving just the four-cylinder OHV engine and notchback coupe, sedan, and wagon models. Also for 1988, all previous trim-level designations were dropped. All Firenza body styles came in a single unnamed base model that could be equipped with six various option packages.

Sales of the Cavalier and Sunbird annually dwarfed the Firenza. Due to this, the Firenza was not replaced in Oldsmobile's lineup, leaving the Cutlass Calais as the division's smallest car. The Cimarron was discontinued that year as well. Leeds Assembly, which built the Firenza, was closed. The Skyhawk lasted another year, while GM kept the first-generation Sunbird and Cavalier in production until 1994.

=== Trims and options ===
- Sedan:
  - base • 1982–1988
  - LX • 1982–1987
- Hatchback:
  - S • 1982–1987
  - SX • 1982–1985
  - GT • 1983-1987
- Wagon:
  - Cruiser • 1983–1988
  - LX Cruiser • 1983–1985
- Coupe:
  - base • 1986–1988
  - LC • 1986–1987

== GT ==
The Firenza GT was only available on the S Coupe hatchback, unlike the Chevy Cavalier Z24, Buick Skyhawk T-Type, and Pontiac Sunbird GT, which could be had as either two-door hatchbacks, two-door and four-door sedans. Four door hatchbacks of the J-platform were offered in Europe.

GTs first were introduced in 1983, 65 were built; red with silver lower panel accent color, sold as "Brass Hat" promotional cars for dealerships, most were equipped with the "new" 1.8-liter overhead cam motor, with either a three-speed automatic or five-speed manual transmission. FE3 suspension was included in the package with a rear-stabilizer bar, heavier struts all the way around, and a wider 205/60 tire offering on the 14" polycast wheels as standard for the GT package. 1984; red/silver carried over plus white with silver lower body color was added. 2312 GTs were produced, less than 20% were white. Engines either were the 2.0-liter (four-speed manual or three-speed auto) or the 1.8-liter (five-speed manual or three-speed auto).

For 1985, 498 GTs were built, body colors were changed to either black or gray with silver trim (not as pronounced as with the 1983-84s.) A fiberglass hood with a pronounced center bulge was included, the 2.8-liter V6 was offered with only the four-speed manual or the three-speed auto, the wheels were changed to aluminum from the previous polycast wheel, this was to be the same for 1986 GT. 1986 was the only year the GT as its own separate trim level (with 1032 built), and the body color red became available again with silver accent. For 1987, the GT model (of 783 built), went back to an option on the hatchback and was the last year offered, essentially same as 1986, but added the availability of the heavier five-speed manual transmission that was on the 1.8-liter offering three years previous, along with the three-speed auto. The LB6 2.8-liter V6, 5-speed Getrag manual equipped 1987 Firenza GT performed 0-60mph in 8.6 seconds (0-100 km/h 9.1 seconds), with a top speed of 124mph (200km/h), doing the 1/4 mile (402m) drag in 16.6 seconds. The 3-speed automatic equipped GT did 0-60mph in 9.6 seconds (0-100 km/h 10.2 seconds), with a top speed of 109mph (175 km/h), doing the 1/4 mile (402m) in 17.3 seconds. Interesting note; The "GT" was used on the Calais and Ciera in 1987, replacing the "ES" (EuroSport) designation the previous two years, 1984-1985.

The Firenza ES (EuroSport) sedan was introduced in Canada for 1984, and the U.S. in 1985. Not much is known of this offering, it had blacked out headlight bezels and blacked out trim on the tail lights, the interior upholstery used the same two color gray combo and red piping as with all the GTs. This was offered as a four-door GT trim, with the same polycast wheels, heavier suspension, used on the 1983 and 1984 GT hatchbacks. They were only offered in a dark-silver body color.

== Sales ==
Year	Coupe	Hatchback	Sedan	Wagon	Yearly Total
1982	-	14,911	15,197	-	30,108
1983	-	11,975	16,345	12,432	40,752
1984	-	17,990	46,325	18,160	82,475
1985	-	7,684	27,929	8,727	44,340
1986	14,870	3,563	22,852	5,416	46,701
1987	6,209	1,774	14,985	2,860	25,828
1988	2,724	-	8,612	920	12,256
Total	23,803	57,897	152,245	48,515	282,460

== Engines ==
- 1982: 1.8 L L46 carbureted OHV I4
- 1982–1986: 1.8 L LH8 TBI SOHC I4
- 1983-1986: 2.0 L LQ5 TBI OHV I4
- 1987–1988: 2.0 L LT2 TBI SOHC I4
- 1987–1988: 2.0 L LL8 TBI OHV I4
- 1985–1987: 2.8 L LB6 MPFI OHV V6
