= MG2 =

MG2 may refer to:

- MG2 (company), an architecture firm based in Seattle, Washington, United States
- Metal Gear 2: Solid Snake, video game
- Rheinmetall MG3
- MG2 electric motor, Motor Generator No. 2 in Toyota Hybrid System
- Mg^{2+}, magnesium
- A General Motors RPO code for the Getrag 282 transmission
- Meteor Garden II
- Moto G (2014 version), a smartphone made by Motorola

== See also ==
- MG1 (disambiguation)
