= MG1 =

MG1 may refer to:

- Realistic Concertmate MG-1, an analog synthesizer
- MG1 electric motor, Motor Generator No. 1 in Toyota Hybrid System
- A General Motors RPO code for the Getrag 282 transmission.
- Metal Gear 1

== See also ==
- MG2 (disambiguation)
