= Cadillac Cimarron =

1982-1988 U.S. motor vehicle from General Motors

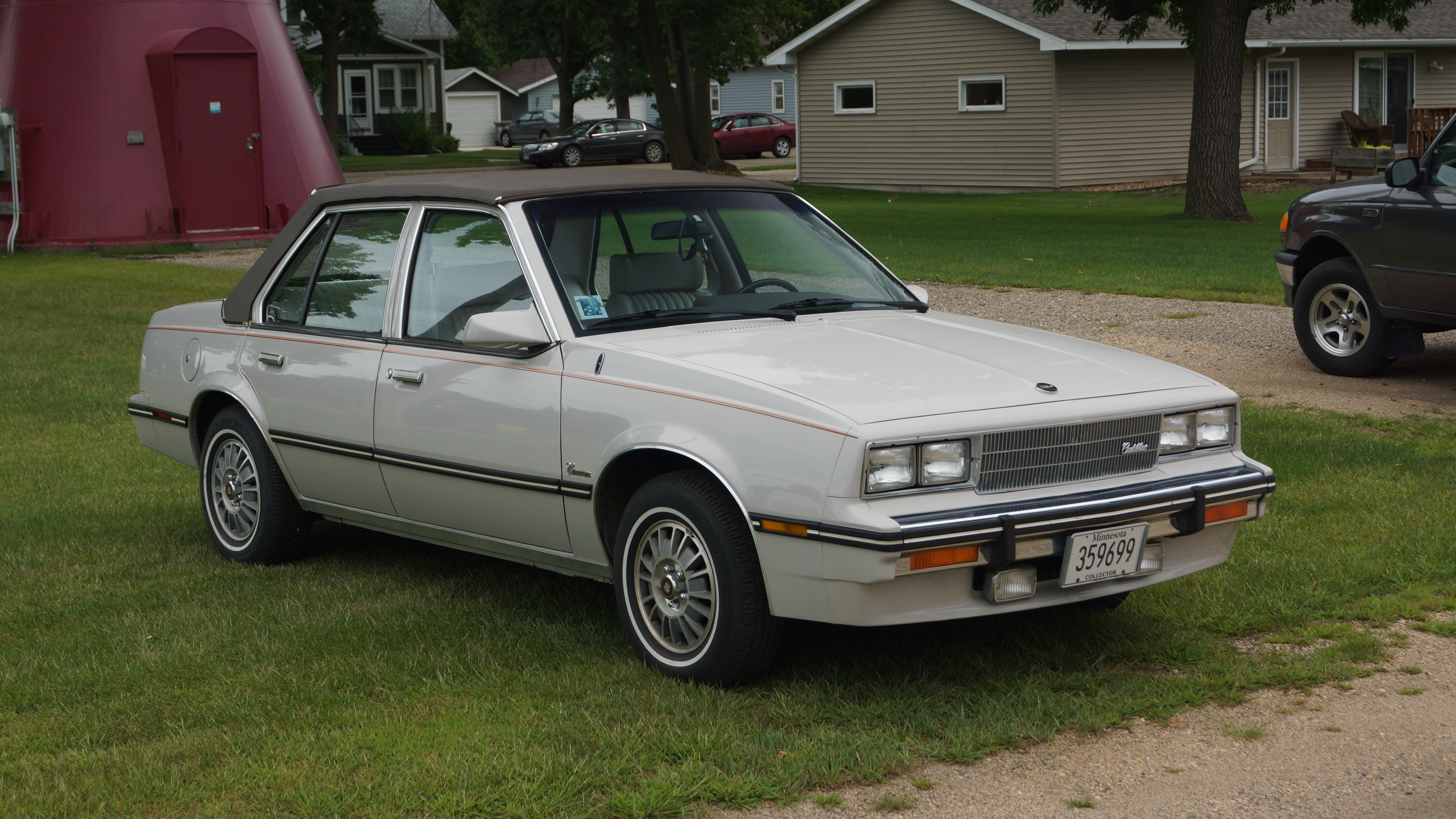
- 1983 Cadillac Cimarron

Overview
- Manufacturer: Cadillac (General Motors)
- Production: 1981–1988
- Model years: 1982–1988
- Assembly: United States: Janesville, Wisconsin (Janesville GM Assembly Plant); South Gate, California (South Gate Assembly)
- Designer: John Manoogian II, Irv Rybicki (1977)

Body and chassis
- Class: Compact luxury car
- Body style: 4-door sedan
- Layout: Transverse front-engine, front-wheel drive
- Platform: J-body (Series 6J)
- Chassis: unibody
- Related: Opel Ascona; Buick Skyhawk; Chevrolet Cavalier; Oldsmobile Firenza; Pontiac J2000/2000/Sunbird

Powertrain
- Engine: 1,841 cc (112.3 cu in) L46 I4; 1,991 cc (121.5 cu in) LQ5 I4; 2,837 cc (173.1 cu in) LB6 V6 (1985–1988)
- Transmission: 4-speed Muncie M17 manual 5-speed Getrag 282 manual 3-speed Turbo-Hydramatic 125 C automatic

Dimensions
- Wheelbase: 101.2 in (2,570 mm)
- Length: 177.8 in (4,516 mm)
- Width: 66.3 in (1,684 mm)
- Height: 54.0 in (1,372 mm)
- Curb weight: 2,639 lb (1,197 kg)

The Cadillac Cimarron is an entry-level luxury car manufactured and marketed by the Cadillac division of General Motors for model years 1982–1988 over a single generation, with a mild facelift in 1985.

The first post-war compact car offered by the brand, the four-door was developed to compete with similarly-sized premium sedans marketed by European automakers in North America.

The flagship offering of the GM J platform, the Cimarron had joined the project just eleven months prior to the J-Cars' arrival in showrooms, and Cadillac had very little involvement in the program. Marketed with counterparts from Chevrolet, Pontiac, Oldsmobile, and Buick, the Cimarron was to become one of the most controversial examples of badge engineering in the American automotive industry, sharing much of its entire design, including its exterior, with the Chevrolet Cavalier and GM's other brand variants.

Through its entire production, the Cimarron was manufactured at South Gate Assembly (1981–1982) and Janesville Assembly (1982–1988); both facilities produced the model alongside the Chevrolet Cavalier and its J-platform badge-engineered variants. In North America, the Cimarron was not replaced directly.

The Cimarron is noted as a nadir of GM's product planning – for its low sales, poor performance, and ill-conceived badge engineering.

== Background ==
As General Motors prepared for the 1980s, Cadillac product planners considered introducing a sedan smaller than the Seville. While the Seville model had sold well following its 1975 introduction, in its research, Cadillac discovered a growing proportion of buyers of the Seville were not conquest customers of European brands, but American-brand customers seeking a smaller sedan. To further diversify and modernize their product range to compete with European luxury sedans, Cadillac dealers were demanding a smaller car below the Seville that could compete with the compact offerings of European brands.

In early 1980, General Motors commenced development of a Cadillac version of the GM J-car platform, leading to one of the shortest development programs ever undertaken by the company. Ultimately, the Cimarron's development window was confined to 10 months, and aside from modest interior changes, exterior modifications were confined to reworking the grille, adjacent composite (plastic) panels, and taillights.

Originally scheduled for mid-1980s release, the launch of the Cimarron was pushed to early 1981 in order to match the 1982 model-year release of its J-car counterparts for the Chevrolet, Buick, Oldsmobile, and Pontiac divisions. In development since 1976 to replace the H-body, the J-car marked two major changes: shifting to front-wheel drive and expanding into the compact car segment. In line with its predecessor, the J-car was to be the Chevrolet Cavalier (replacing the Monza), Buick Skyhawk, Oldsmobile Firenza (a premium trim of the previous Starfire), and Pontiac J2000 (replacing the Sunbird, eventually taking on the Sunbird name); the J-car was also to be sold by Opel/Vauxhall, Holden, and Isuzu worldwide.

While the creation of the Cadillac Cimarron was intended to give the division a compact sedan that matched multiple European premium brands, the selection of the J-car platform within 14 months of its launch was met with heavy resistance. Pete Estes, GM president at the time, warned Cadillac general manager Edward Kennard: "Ed, you don't have time to turn the J-car into a Cadillac." The original design offered little more than a well-equipped Chevrolet Cavalier, but cost twice as much.

In 1976, Cadillac had previous success with the Seville on a dedicated GM "K" platform which was a stretched version of the GM "X" platform used for the Chevrolet Nova.

== Model name ==
At its May 21, 1981 introduction, the copy text of original sales brochures associated the Cimarron nameplate with "fortitude, adventure and pioneering". The nameplate was chosen from a list that included J2000 (used on predecessor of Pontiac Sunbird); Carmel; Cascade; Caville (blend of "Cadillac" and "De Ville"); Envoy (used decades later on an unrelated SUV by sister division GMC); and Series 62 (predecessor of Cadillac Calais).

For 1982, the model was marketed as "Cimarron by Cadillac"; the Cadillac name did not appear anywhere on the car. Cadillac salespeople were even admonished not to refer to the car as the Cadillac Cimarron, but merely as the Cimarron. For 1983, the naming was revised to Cadillac Cimarron; for the rest of its production, the Cadillac script appeared only on the grille.

== Design ==
The Cimarron used the front-wheel drive GM J platform with a 101.2 in (2,570 mm) wheelbase. Employing unibody construction, the suspension, which was calibrated with GM's "F41" suspension, used front MacPherson struts which were mounted to a subframe, lower control arms, coil springs and a stabilizer bar, while a torsion-beam rear axle, along with rear stabilizer bars, was shared with the Buick Skyhawk and Oldsmobile Firenza and was borrowed from the GM X and A platforms.

To distinguish the Cimarron from the Chevrolet Cavalier and its Buick, Oldsmobile, and Pontiac counterparts, Cadillac standardized many of the available features offered on J-platform cars at the time. The listed retail price for 1982 was $12,181 (equivalent to $40,600 in 2025) and the standard equipment were air conditioning, additional sound insulation, Trianon deep-pile carpeting including the trunk, aluminum alloy wheels on steel-belted radial tires, twin power adjustable side view mirrors, leather-wrapped steering wheel, full instrumentation including tachometer (the only Cadillac to have this at the time), courtesy lights, intermittent wipers, rear window defogger, and AM/FM stereo. Its interior featured simulated aluminum trim, notably initially foregoing simulated wood trim, which was added in later years with appearance updates. Leather was offered for the upholstery and door panels only in the Cimarron, and the name "Cimarron" was embroidered on the seatback surface. Digital instruments were offered in 1986 along with Touch Climate Control air conditioning, and a leather and faux suede upholstery option was later offered. The dashboard assembly was shared with the Cavalier and the Sunbird, while the Firenza and Skyhawk shared an entirely different design. Twilight Sentinel and fog lights were added as standard equipment in 1983.

Available options for 1982 included automatic transmission for $370, cruise control for $155, tilt steering wheel for $88, power windows for $216, power door locks for $12, power driver and passenger seats for $366 for both, Vista Vent with rear tilt sunroof for $261, and a choice of a cassette player, $153 with a separate choice offering a CB radio for $560. Additional convenience and appearance options available were twin lighted vanity mirrors for $92, power trunk release for $29, door edge guards for $22, license plate frame for $12, trunk lid luggage rack for $98, carpeted floor mats front for $38 and rear for $22, trunk mat for $18 and whitewall tires for $55. With the exception of its upholstery and model-specific special suspension tuning, J-platform sedans from other GM divisions could be optioned nearly identically to a Cimarron, though doing so would raise prices close to the Cimarron's base price.

=== Powertrain ===
For 1982, the Cimarron was equipped with a Chevrolet-built 1.8 L four-cylinder engine, producing 88 hp (66 kW) (the first four-cylinder Cadillac since the 1914 Cadillac Model 1914 and the first engine below 2.0 L displacement since 1908). For 1983, the engine was enlarged to a Chevrolet-built 2.0 L and given throttle-body fuel injection, though engine tuning would drop peak output to 86 hp (64 kW). For 1985, a Chevrolet-built 2.8 L V6, which was shared only with the Chevrolet Cavalier coupe and Oldsmobile Firenza hatchback, was added as an option, producing 130 hp (97 kW); the V6 became the standard engine for 1988 but was not available in the Cavalier or Firenza sedans. Both engines were paired with a four-speed or five-speed manual depending on model year, with a three-speed automatic as an option, shared with other division vehicles.

== Model history ==
For 1983, the model underwent minor visible revisions. An offset "Cadillac" script replaced the crest emblem in the grille (a flat-mounted crest is mounted above the grille); the aluminum wheels were redesigned. The hard plastic storage bin was removed from the rear passenger seat (giving the model line a fifth seat).

For 1984 and 1985, Cimarron was offered with a special option package called d’Oro. Essentially a gold trim package (d’Oro translates to "golden" from Italian and Spanish) with a unique hood badge, the option added gold accents to the aluminum alloy wheels, grille, and bumper rub strips, along with accent stripes on the belt line and hood centerline. The interior featured a d’Oro instrument panel plaque and gold-finish steering wheel spokes. For 1984, the option was offered only with a black exterior and a tan leather interior; all trim on the bumpers was black, along with smoke-grey foglamp covers. For 1985, the d’Oro option added white and red exterior colors, and grooved lower-body trim was color-keyed to match the body.

For 1985, the exterior underwent a more visible update. Alongside a new grille which distanced the appearance from the Cavalier, a "power dome" hood was introduced; silver-color grooved lower-body trim was introduced. Depending on the trim, grille badging featured either the Cadillac script or the return of the Cadillac crest.

For 1986, the rear fascia underwent a separate revision, including wraparound tail lamps. A premium Delco–Bose "Symphony Sound" with integrated equalizer and cassette player was introduced as an option. This was the final year for the Cimarron in Canada.

For 1987, the front fascia underwent a second revision, receiving composite-lens headlamp units (the first American J-body to do so) and redesigned alloy wheels.

For its last year in the United States, the 1988 Cimarron received several engineering updates.

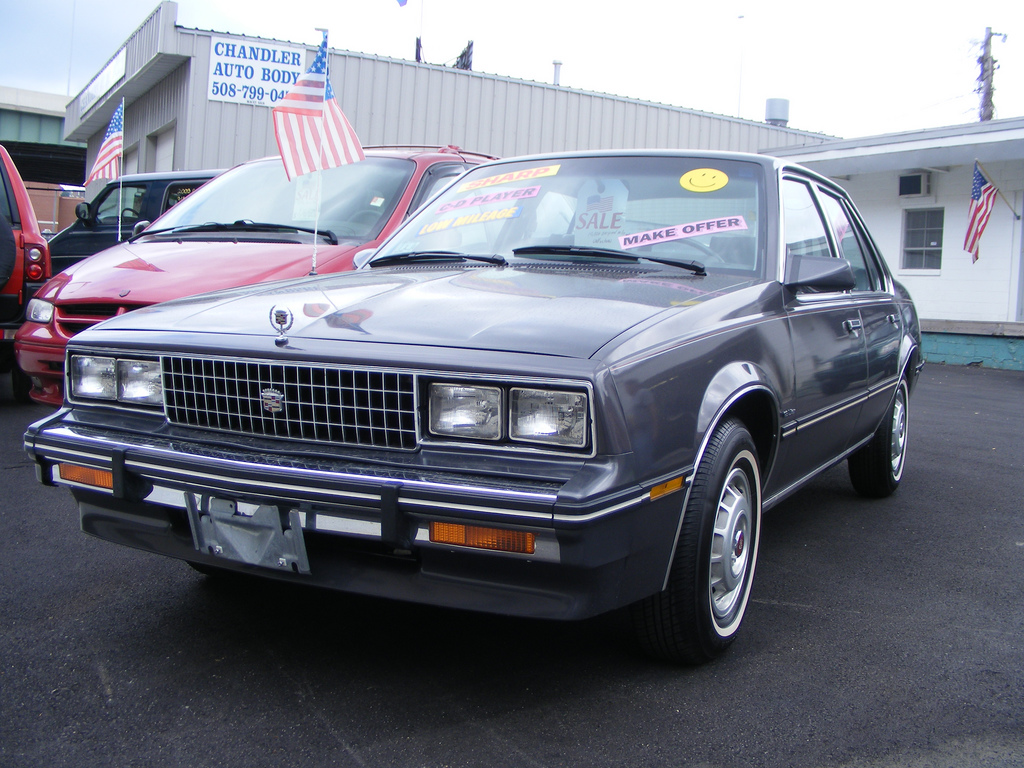
1982 Cimarron, front

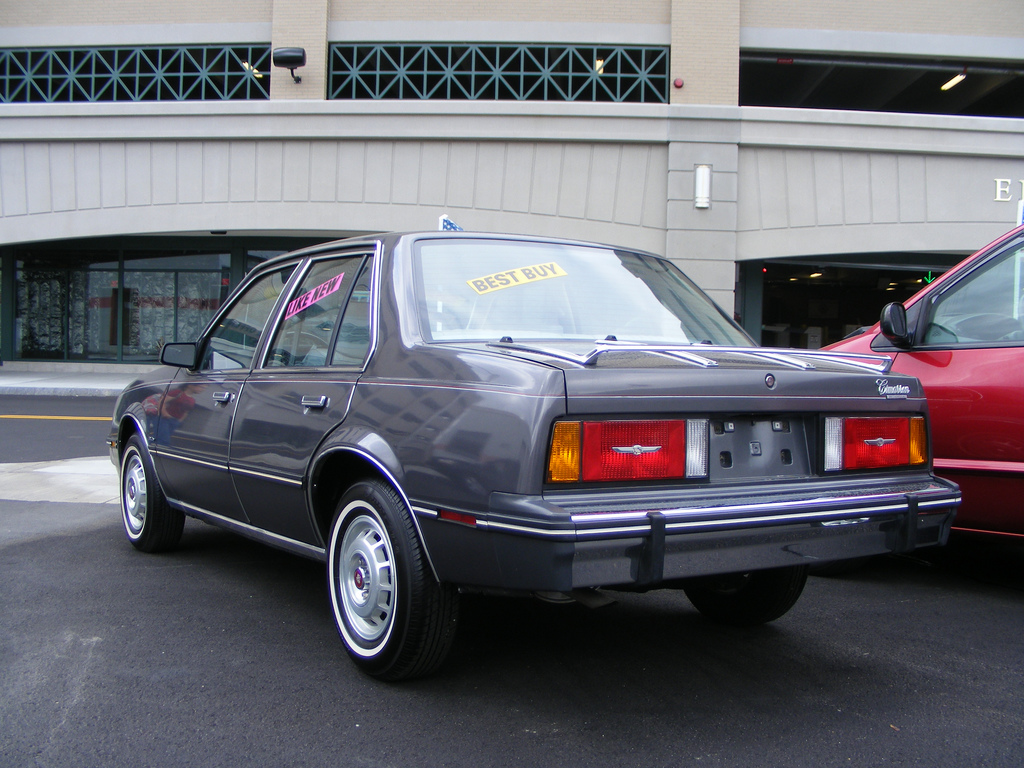
1982 Cimarron, rear

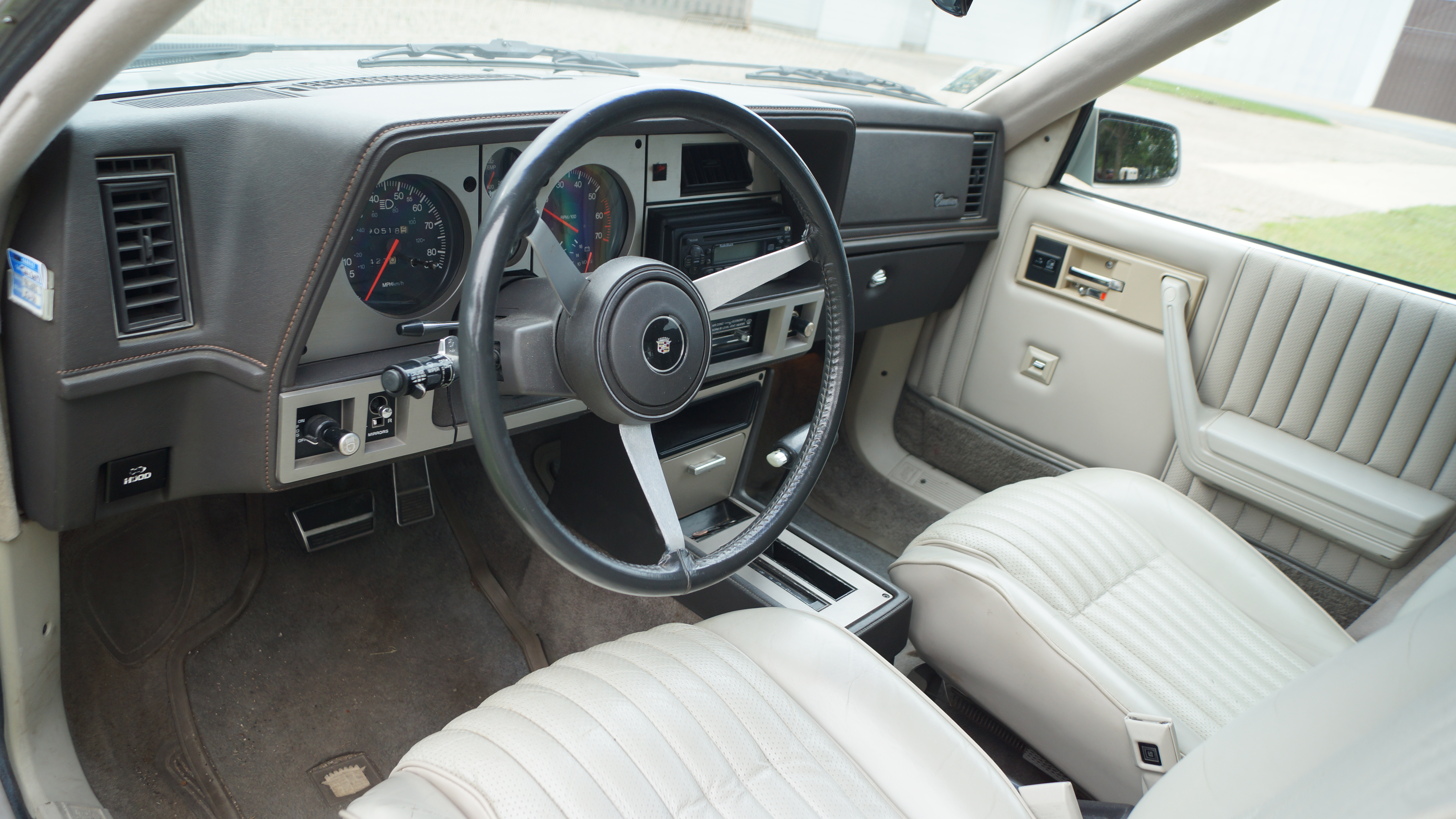
1983 Cimarron, dashboard

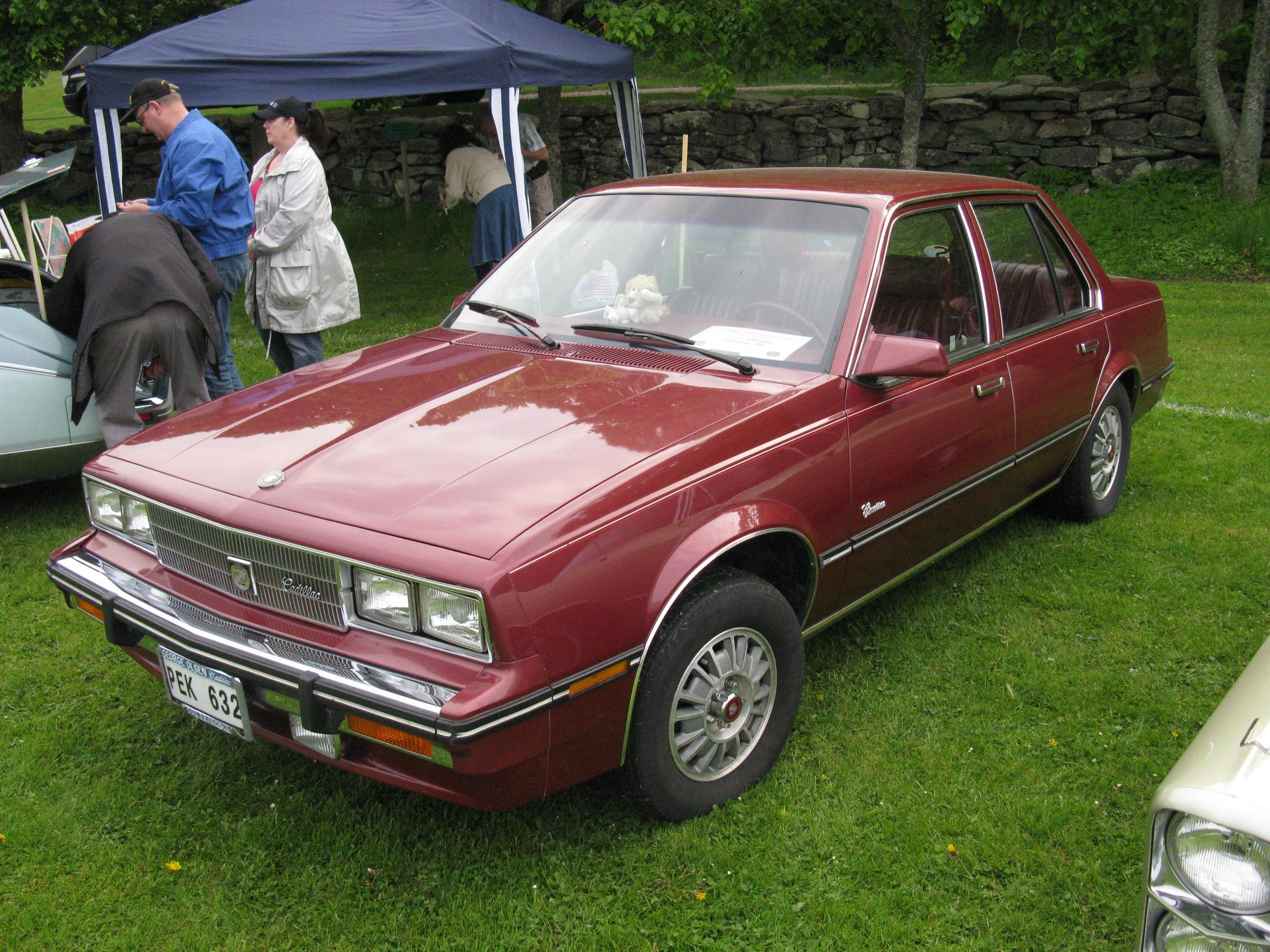
1985 Cimarron d'Oro

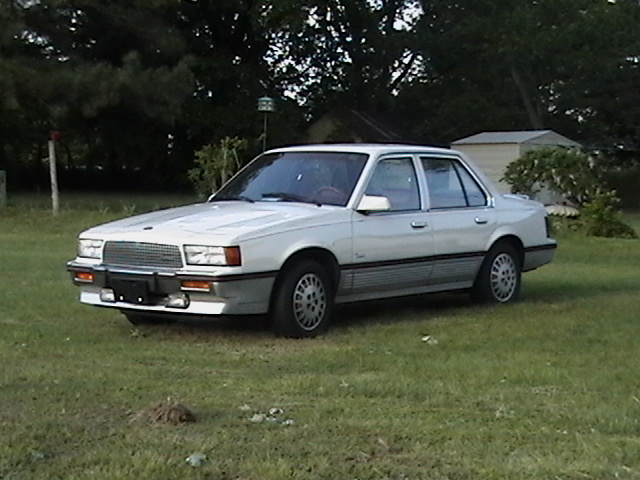
1988 Cimarron

=== Discontinuation ===
As the Cimarron was still selling 15,000 to 20,000 units annually, Cadillac initially sought to keep the model in production. While Cimarron sales had been lower than predicted, many of them were to conquest buyers new to Cadillac and younger in age than the typical Cadillac buyer of the time.

In a 9-to-1 vote, General Motors management instead decided to discontinue the model for multiple reasons including Cimarron's disappointing sales and the company wanting to prioritize its resources towards major updates of the 1988 Eldorado and Seville and 1989 Sedan de Ville and Fleetwood. While the larger Brougham was ultimately redesigned for 1993 (becoming the Fleetwood Brougham), GM saw no upside towards continuation of the Cimarron, as it also sought to limit the price overlap between Cadillac, Buick, and Oldsmobile.

== Reception and legacy ==
The Cimarron's market failure is one in a series of events throughout the 1980s and 1990s which caused Cadillac's share of the US market to decline from 3.8% in 1979 to 2.2% in 1997; it is routinely cited as the nadir of GM's product planning:

- Noted automotive journalist Dan Neil included the Cimarron in his 2007 list of Worst Cars of all Time, saying "everything that was wrong, venal, lazy, and mendacious about GM in the 1980s was crystallized in this flagrant insult to the good name and fine customers of Cadillac." He added that the Cimarron "nearly killed Cadillac and remains its biggest shame."
- Forbes placed the Cimarron on its list of "Legendary Car Flops", citing low sales, poor performance and the fact the car "didn't work, coming from a luxury brand."
- CarBuzz called the Cimarron a "textbook example of what goes wrong when a carmaker tries to badge engineer an economy car into a luxury car."
- Forbes magazine said the Cimarron "appealed neither to Cadillac's loyal followers, who appreciated powerful V8s and Cadillac's domestic luxury edge, nor to buyers who favored Europe's luxury brands, whose cars out-handled and out-classed the Cimarron in every way."
- CNN Money described the Cimarron as "in all important respects, a Chevrolet Cavalier. It also added thousands to the price tag. In all, it was neither a good Cadillac nor a good value. Today, GM executives will readily admit that this was a bad idea."
- In its introduction of the Cadillac BLS, Car and Driver said that Cadillac product director John Howell kept a picture of a Cimarron on his wall, captioned "Lest we forget".

Since the withdrawal of the Cimarron after the 1988 model year, Cadillac has not produced a direct successor to the model line. Subsequent Cadillac sedans derived from other GM vehicles, including the Catera (Opel Omega) and the BLS (Saab 9-3) were not compact executive cars, in terms of size. The smallest current Cadillac sedan (the CT4 and its ATS predecessor) is a compact executive car larger than the Cimarron, sharing no common body panels with other GM sedans.

The Cimarron had some firsts for Cadillac: first four-cylinder engine since 1914, first manual transmission since 1951, first-ever "export" style taillamps with separate amber turn signal indicators (for the US market), first compact-sized car, etc.

== Yearly American sales ==
GM ended sales of the Cimarron following the 1988 model year. Oldsmobile's J-car variant, the Firenza, was also discontinued that year, followed by the J-car Buick Skyhawk in 1989. By 1990, the sub-compact, J-car economy model range in North America was pared down solely to Chevrolet and Pontiac. The turbocharged engine was not available in the Buick sedan and the V6 engine was not available in the Firenza sedan while the V6 became optional in the Cimarron starting 1985.

Model Year	Cimarron sedan	Buick Skyhawk sedan	Oldsmobile Firenza sedan
1982	25,968	22,540	15,197
1983	19,194	19,847	16,345
1984	21,898	45,648	46,325
1985	19,890	27,906	27,929
1986	24,534	29,959	22,852
1987	14,561	17,978	14,985
1988	6,454	14,271	8,612
TOTAL	132,499	178,149	152,245
