= General Motors 122 engine =

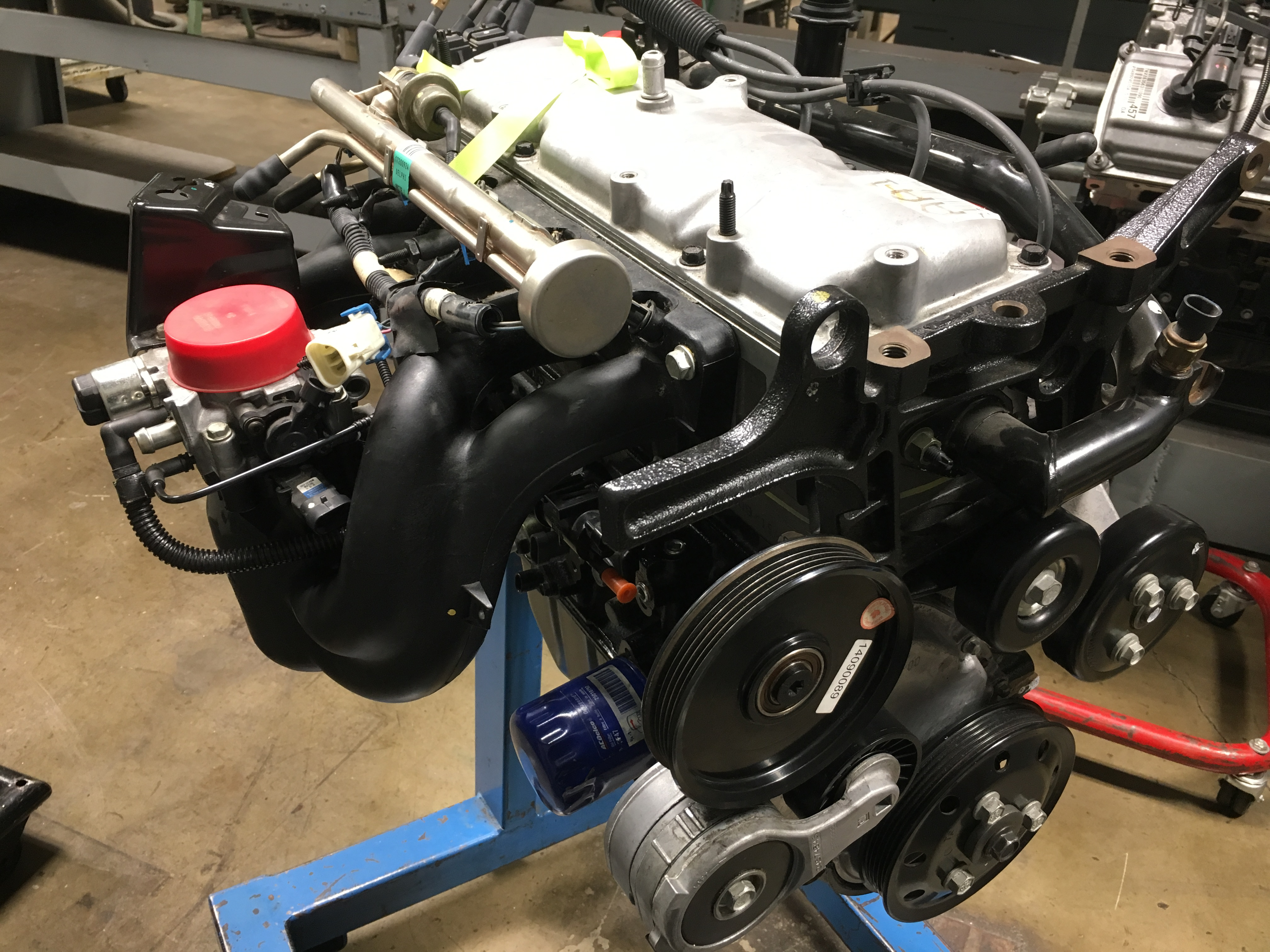

Overview
- Manufacturer: General Motors
- Production: 1982–2003

Layout
- Configuration: Naturally aspirated straight-four engine
- Displacement: 1.8 L (1,841 cc; 112.3 cu in); 2.0 L (1,991 cc; 121.5 cu in); 2.2 L (2,189 cc; 133.6 cu in)
- Cylinder bore: 89 mm (3.5 in)
- Piston stroke: 74 mm (2.91 in); 80 mm (3.15 in); 88 mm (3.46 in)
- Cylinder block material: Cast iron
- Cylinder head material: Cast iron (1982–1986); Aluminum (1987–2003)
- Valvetrain: OHV 2 valves × cyl.
- Compression ratio: 9.0:1

Combustion
- Fuel system: Rochester carburetor Throttle-body fuel injection Multi-point fuel injection Sequential multi-port FI
- Fuel type: Gasoline, E85, LPG
- Oil system: Wet sump
- Cooling system: Water-cooled

Output
- Power output: 83–120 hp (62–89 kW)
- Torque output: 108–140 lb⋅ft (146–190 N⋅m)

Chronology
- Predecessor: GM Iron Duke engine
- Successor: Ecotec engine (Cars); GM Atlas engine (Trucks)

The 122 engine was designed by Chevrolet and was used in a wide array of General Motors vehicles. The 122 was similar to the first two generations of the General Motors 60° V6 engine; sharing cylinder bore diameters and some parts. The 122 was available in the U.S. beginning in 1982 for the GM J platform compact cars and S-series trucks.

For the J-cars, it evolved through 2002 when it was replaced by GM's Ecotec line of DOHC 4-cylinder engines. In the S-10 related models, it evolved through 2003 and was known as the Vortec 2200. Production ceased consistent with the replacement of the S-series trucks with the GMT 355 sub-platform.

== Generation I ==
=== 1.8 ===
==== L46 ====
The 1.8-liter pushrod engine was the first engine to power the J-body cars. Introduced with the models in 1982, the 1.8 used a two-barrel Rochester carburetor and produced 88 hp (66 kW) and 100 lb⋅ft (140 N⋅m) of torque. Since peak output came on at higher RPM, acceleration in these cars was quite sluggish, with a test 1982 Pontiac J2000 accelerating from 0–60 mph (0–97 km/h) in 16.3 seconds, with a 1/4 mile (402 m) time of 20.6 seconds.

Applications:

- 1982 Buick Skyhawk
- 1982 Cadillac Cimarron
- 1982 Chevrolet Cavalier
- 1982 Oldsmobile Firenza
- 1982 Pontiac J2000

=== 2.0 ===
==== LQ5 ====
A stroked version of the 1.8-liter engine, displacing 2.0 liters, was introduced midway through 1982, to provide more low-end power for the J-cars. This engine replaced the 1.8-liter engine altogether and had throttle-body fuel injection. It produced 86 hp (64 kW), and 110 lb⋅ft (150 N⋅m).

Applications:

- 1983–1986 Buick Skyhawk
- 1983–1986 Cadillac Cimarron
- 1983–1986 Chevrolet Cavalier
- 1983–1986 Oldsmobile Firenza
- 1983–1985 Pontiac J2000/2000/Sunbird

==== LQ2 ====
This engine was similar to the LQ5, except that it used a two-barrel carburetor instead of a throttle-body fuel injection system. This engine was used in the Chevrolet S-10 and GMC S-15 compact pickup trucks and their Blazer and Jimmy counterparts from the fall of 1983 until the spring of 1984. It was replaced by the 2.5-liter Tech IV engine in the fall of 1984 when production resumed for the 1985 model year. This engine produced 83 hp (62 kW) at 4600 rpm and 108 lb⋅ft (146 N⋅m) at 2400 rpm. Redline was 4750 rpm so full horsepower could never be sustained. The rear end of the S-series truck was geared so low that GM had to make the new overdrive transmission standard because without the 4th gear this engine could only propel the truck safely to 50 mph without overheating. The trucks got 40% better gas mileage than the J-cars (all equipped with the 3 speed automatic) because of the 4 speed automatic overdrive. This engine was also the only S10 engine to have a direct-to-shaft non-clutched engine-driven fan, and wasn't ecm controlled (so it had no service engine soon light).

Applications:

- 1983–1984 Chevrolet S-10 and GMC S-15
- 1983–1984 Chevrolet S-10 Blazer and GMC S-15 Jimmy

== Generation II ==
=== 2.0 ===
==== LL8 ====
This engine replaced the LQ5 and was used from 1987 until 1989. It featured throttle-body fuel injection and produced 90 hp (67 kW) and 108 lb⋅ft (146 N⋅m) of torque.

Applications:

- 1987–1989 Buick Skyhawk
- 1987–1989 Chevrolet Beretta
- 1987–1989 Chevrolet Cavalier
- 1987–1989 Chevrolet Corsica
- 1987–1988 Oldsmobile Firenza
- 1987–1989 Pontiac Tempest

=== 2.2 ===
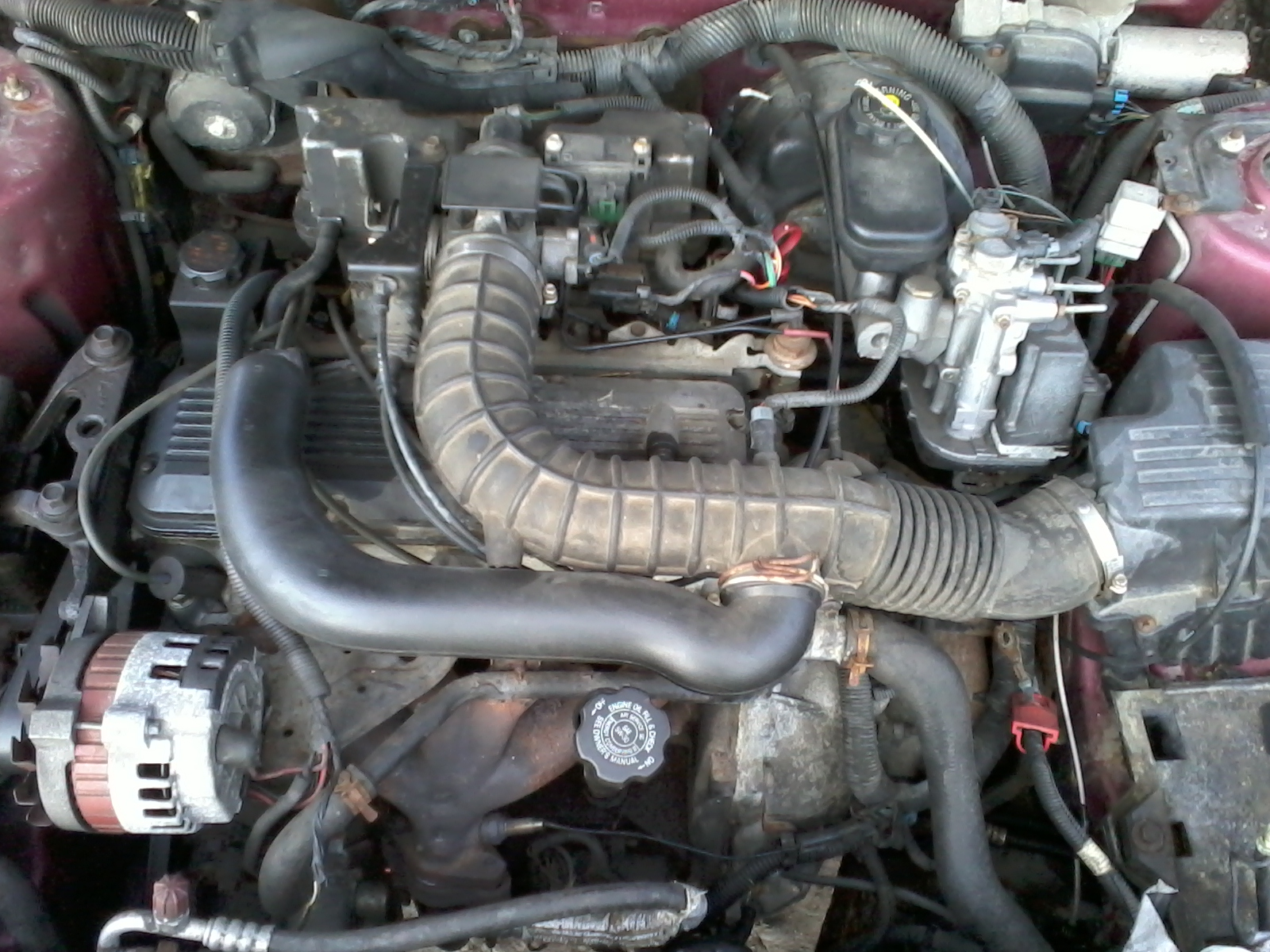
2.2-liter OHV I4 engine

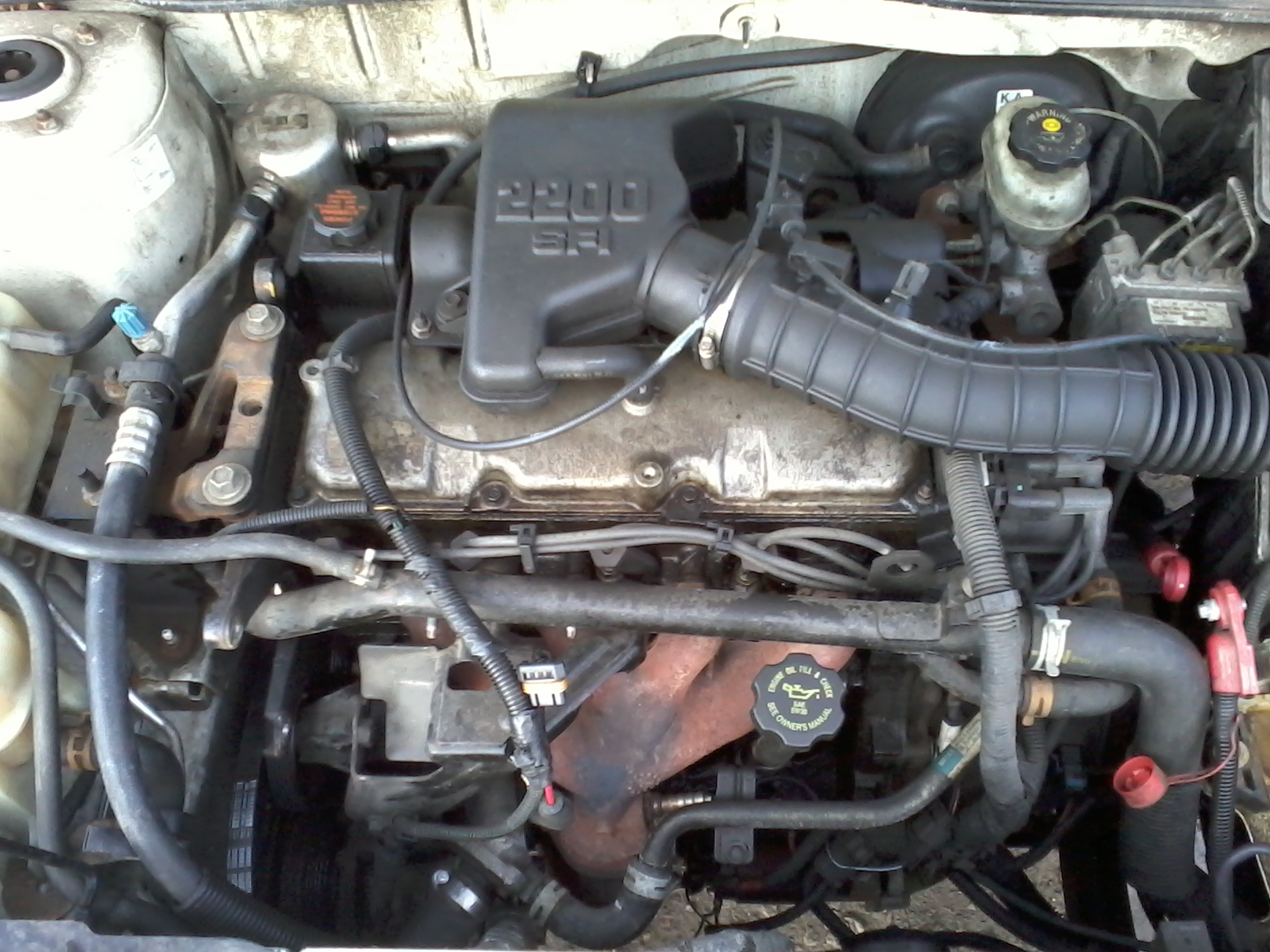
2200 OHV I4 engine

==== LM3 ====
For the 1990 model year, GM replaced the 2.0-liter engine with a stroked version displacing 2.2 liters and using throttle-body fuel injection (TBI). Commonly called the 2.2, it produced 95 hp (71 kW) and 120 lb⋅ft (163 N⋅m) of torque.

Applications:

- 1990–1991 Chevrolet Beretta
- 1990–1991 Chevrolet Cavalier
- 1990–1991 Chevrolet Corsica
- 1990–1991 Pontiac Tempest

==== LN2 ====
For 1992, the 2.2 received multi-port fuel injection (MPFI), replacing the TBI version in the J-body cars and increasing power to 110 hp (82 kW) and 130 lb⋅ft (176 N⋅m) of torque. In the L-body cars, it was converted straight to Sequential Fuel Injection. In 1994, all 2.2-liter engines were updated to sequential multi-port fuel injection and power increased to 120 hp (89 kW), with torque increasing to 140 lb⋅ft (190 N⋅m). The MPFI and SFI versions produced enough power to allow the 2.2 to replace the old Pontiac Iron Duke engine as the 4-cylinder offering in the S/T trucks and A-body cars. For 1996, it became known as the Vortec 2200 in the S/T trucks.

For 1998, the engine was revised for emissions regulations and became known as the 2200. This revision lowered power to 115 hp (86 kW) at 5000 rpm, and torque to 135 lb⋅ft (183 N⋅m) at 3600 rpm. The engine was discontinued in 2003, replaced by the 2.2-liter DOHC Ecotec engine. Although it displaces 134 cu. in, the 2.2-liter OHV is still commonly referred to as the GM 122 today, and has been reputed for its simplicity, reliability, and ease of maintenance in the J-body cars and S-series trucks, and a few L-body cars. The 2003 model LN2 is equipped with secondary air injection.

Applications:

- 1993–1996 Buick Century
- 1992–1996 Chevrolet Beretta
- 1992–2002 Chevrolet Cavalier
- 1992–1996 Chevrolet Corsica
- 1993 Chevrolet Lumina
- 1994-1997 Chevrolet S-10, GMC Sonoma, and Isuzu Hombre
- 1993–1994 Grumman LLV
- 1993–1996 Oldsmobile Cutlass Ciera
- 1995–2002 Pontiac Sunfire

==== L43 ====
The Vortec 2200 (RPO code L43) is an OHV straight-4 truck engine. This engine is equipped with secondary air injection, and is flex-fuel capable. It is entirely different from the Iron Duke, and was the last North American iteration of the GM 122 engine. The 2200 uses an iron block and aluminum two-valve cylinder head. Output is 120 hp (89 kW) at 5000 rpm and 140 lb⋅ft (190 N⋅m) at 3600 rpm. Displacement is 2.2 L; 133.6 cu in (2,189 cc) with an 89 mm × 88 mm (3.50 in × 3.46 in) bore and stroke. 2200s were built at GM's Tonawanda engine plant in Buffalo. This engine was replaced by the LN2 in September 2002. This engine did not commonly come with an EGR valve from 1998-2002 on the S-series trucks despite earlier versions using one. Instead a block off plate is on the back of the cylinder head.

Applications:

- 1998–2002 Chevrolet S-10, GMC Sonoma, and Isuzu Hombre
