= Chevrolet Beretta =

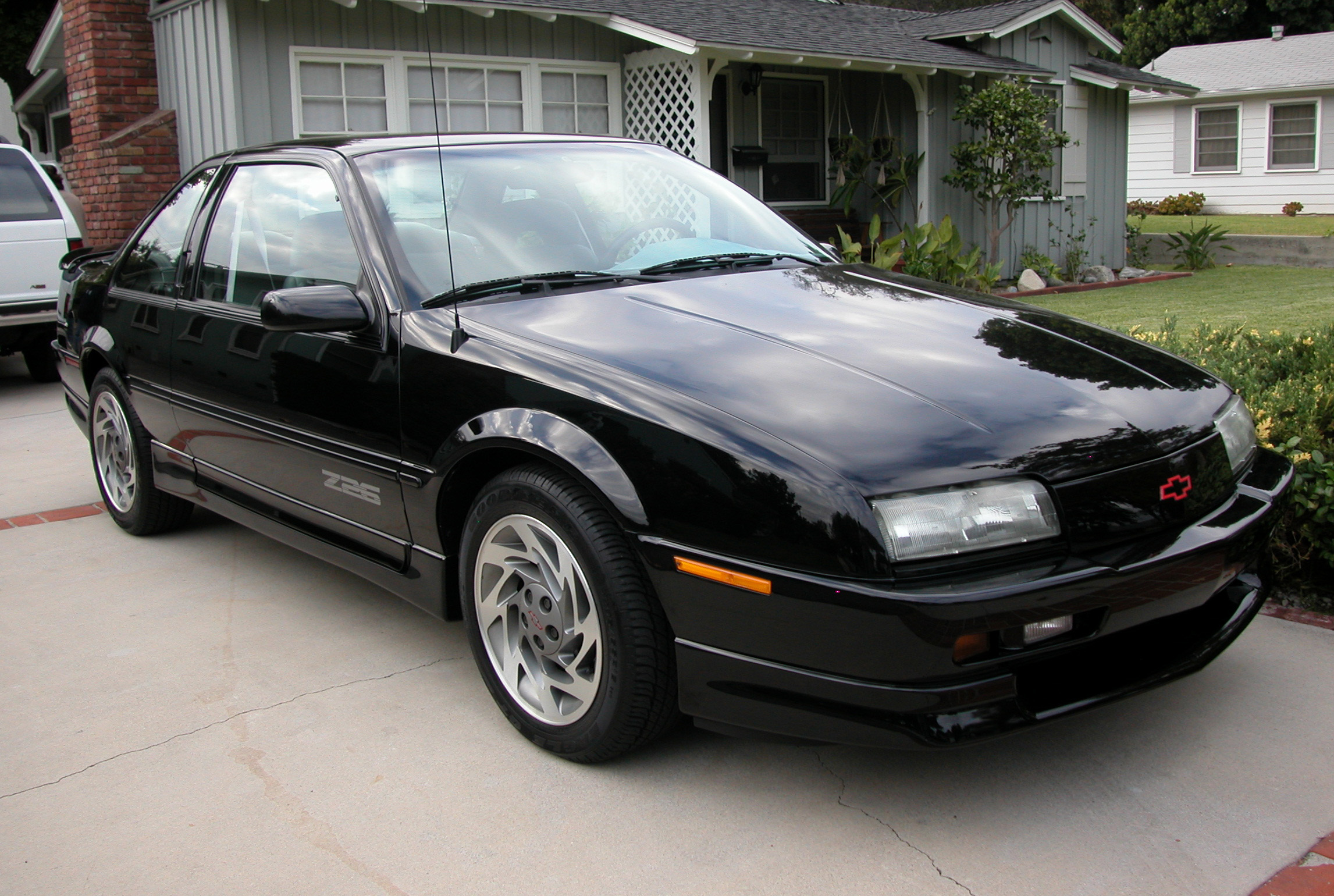
- 1996 Chevrolet Beretta Z26

Overview
- Manufacturer: Chevrolet
- Production: 1987–1996
- Model years: 1987–1996
- Assembly: United States: Wilmington, Delaware; United States: Linden, New Jersey
- Designer: Jerry Palmer

Body and chassis
- Class: Sport compact (C)
- Body style: 2-door coupe
- Layout: Transverse front-engine, front-wheel drive
- Platform: L-body
- Related: Chevrolet Corsica; Pontiac Tempest

Powertrain
- Engine: 2.0 L LL8 OHV I4; 2.2 L LM3/LN2 OHV I4; 2.3 L LG0 DOHC 16V I4; 2.8 L LB6 OHV V6; 3.1 L LH0 OHV V6; 3.1 L L82 OHV V6
- Transmission: 3-speed 3T40 automatic 4-speed 4T60-E automatic 5-speed Getrag 282 manual

Dimensions
- Wheelbase: 103.4 in (2,626 mm)
- Length: 187.2 in (4,755 mm)
- Width: 1988–1990: 68.2 in (1,732 mm); 1991–1996: 67.9 in (1,725 mm)
- Height: 1988–1990: 55.3 in (1,405 mm); 1991–1996: 53.2 in (1,351 mm)

Chronology
- Predecessor: Chevrolet Citation coupe Chevrolet Celebrity coupe
- Successor: Chevrolet Malibu; Chevrolet Monte Carlo

The Chevrolet Beretta is a coupé that was produced by Chevrolet from 1987 until 1996. Alongside the four-door Chevrolet Corsica, the Beretta served as the successor to the Chevrolet Citation. Slotted between the Cavalier and Lumina/Monte Carlo coupes, the Beretta was distinguished by its vertical door handles mounted on the B-pillar, a design feature later used by the Chevrolet Lumina coupe and its GM W-body counterparts.

The Beretta shared the front-wheel drive GM L platform with the Corsica; replacing the X-body platform, the L-body was designed by Chevrolet, with the rest of General Motors using the Oldsmobile-designed N-body. The body was designed in the same design studio as the contemporary Camaro and Corvette. For 1990, a Beretta convertible conversion was selected as the Indianapolis 500 pace car; though a replica was initially considered as a convertible, the production replica was offered as a coupe.

During its production, the Beretta was assembled alongside the Corsica and Pontiac Tempest sedans (the latter sold only in Canada) in GM facilities in Wilmington, Delaware, and Linden, New Jersey.

== Models and changes ==
Base model Berettas were equipped with the same powertrain as the Chevrolet Cavalier, the 2.2 L OHV 4-cylinder engine and the 3-speed automatic transmission by default, or the 60-degree V6. A 5-speed manual was available only by special order if paired with the 2.2 L OHV, however very few special orders ever took place, and the 3-speed automatic was the default option.

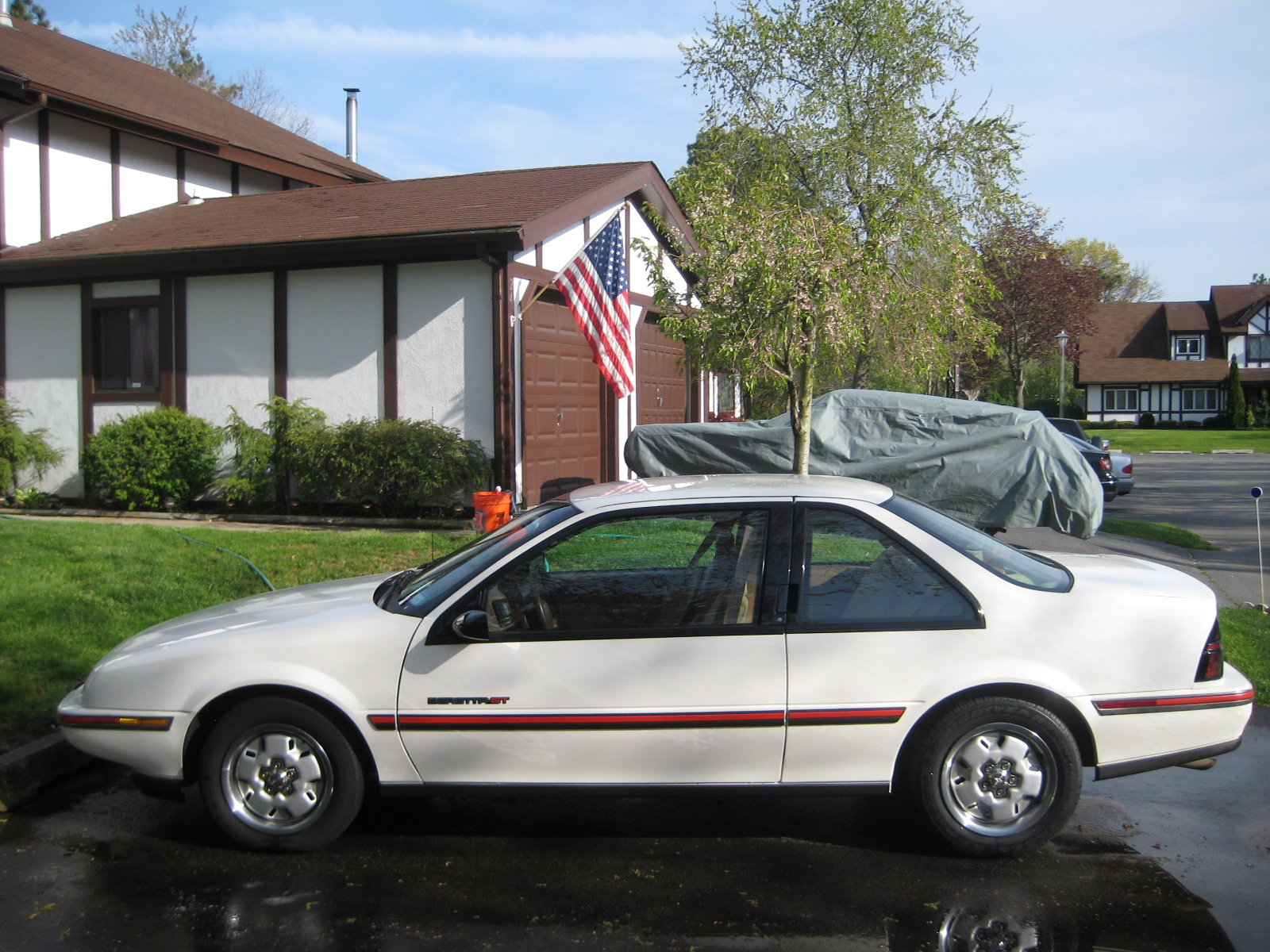
1989 Chevrolet Beretta GT

The GT included a 125 hp 2.8-liter V6, which grew to a 3.1 L in 1990, and the Z51 suspension package (1988 only) with 15-inch styled steel wheels and Goodyear Eagle GT tires. Also included was a sport cloth interior and sport steering wheel.

The Beretta GTU was available for 1988 and 1989. Beretta GTs (with the FE3 suspension package) were shipped to Cars and Concepts where they were equipped with 16x7-inch aluminum alloy wheels, custom ground effects, a unique rear spoiler, mirrors and GTU decals to create the Beretta GTU. With the FE3 suspension package and Z51 RPO, Chevrolet claimed the 1988 Beretta GTU would deliver 0.92 g on the skid pad. GTUs were only available in black, red and white.

The GTZ, which replaced the GTU, took over as the high-performance version of the Beretta. It was produced from 1990 until 1993. It came standard with Oldsmobile's 2.3-liter, high output Quad 4 inline-four, which produced 180 hp (134 kW) and 160 lb⋅ft (217 N⋅m) of torque, giving it a 0–60 mph time of 7.6 seconds. Also standard was a Getrag 5-speed manual transmission and GM's FE7 performance suspension.

Motor Trend's only complaint was the Quad 4's noise, vibration and harshness (NVH) and noted it was one of the most raucous engines of its time. Beginning in 1991, the 3.1 L V6 could be had as an option on the GTZ, but it was only available with a 3-speed automatic transmission that increased the 0-to-60 mph time to around 9.0 seconds. The 3.1 L V6 was standard on 1990–1992 GT models and optional for all base models and GTs in 1992. Starting in the 1994 model year, the 3.1 L V6 could only be ordered with an automatic transmission.

The 1991 model year saw major interior updates, including a new dashboard and center console and the addition of a driver's side airbag.

In 1994, the GT and GTZ were replaced by the Beretta Z26, which put it squarely between the Cavalier Z24 and Lumina Z34 in Chevrolet's lineup. The Z26 had a 0–60 mph time of 8.3 seconds. The 3.1 L V6 was redesigned and became the 3100 V6 and gained 20 hp at 160. The new 3100 V6 was only available with a new 4-speed automatic transmission. The Quad 4 HO lost a total of 10 hp (7 kW) in 1994, its last year of production, down to 170 hp (127 kW). The 2.3 L Quad 4 was only available with a 5-speed manual transmission. In 1995, the 3100 V6 lost 5 hp, down to 155 hp (116 kW), which also carried on to the 1996 model.

Beretta sales steadily declined every year of production as the market turned away from 2-door models. In 1996, Chevrolet ended production of both the Beretta and Corsica after 10 model years. The Corsica was replaced by the Chevrolet Malibu in 1997. The last Beretta was assembled on July 30, 1996.

Production figures
	Total
1987	8,072
1988	275,098
1989	180,242
1990	99,721
1991	69,868
1992	52,451
1993	42,263
1994	64,277
1995	71,762
1996	42,476
Total	906,230

== Models ==
- 1987–1996 base/CL
- 1988–1993 GT
- 1988–1989 GTU
- 1990 Indy
- 1990–1993 GTZ
- 1994–1996 Z26

== Gallery ==
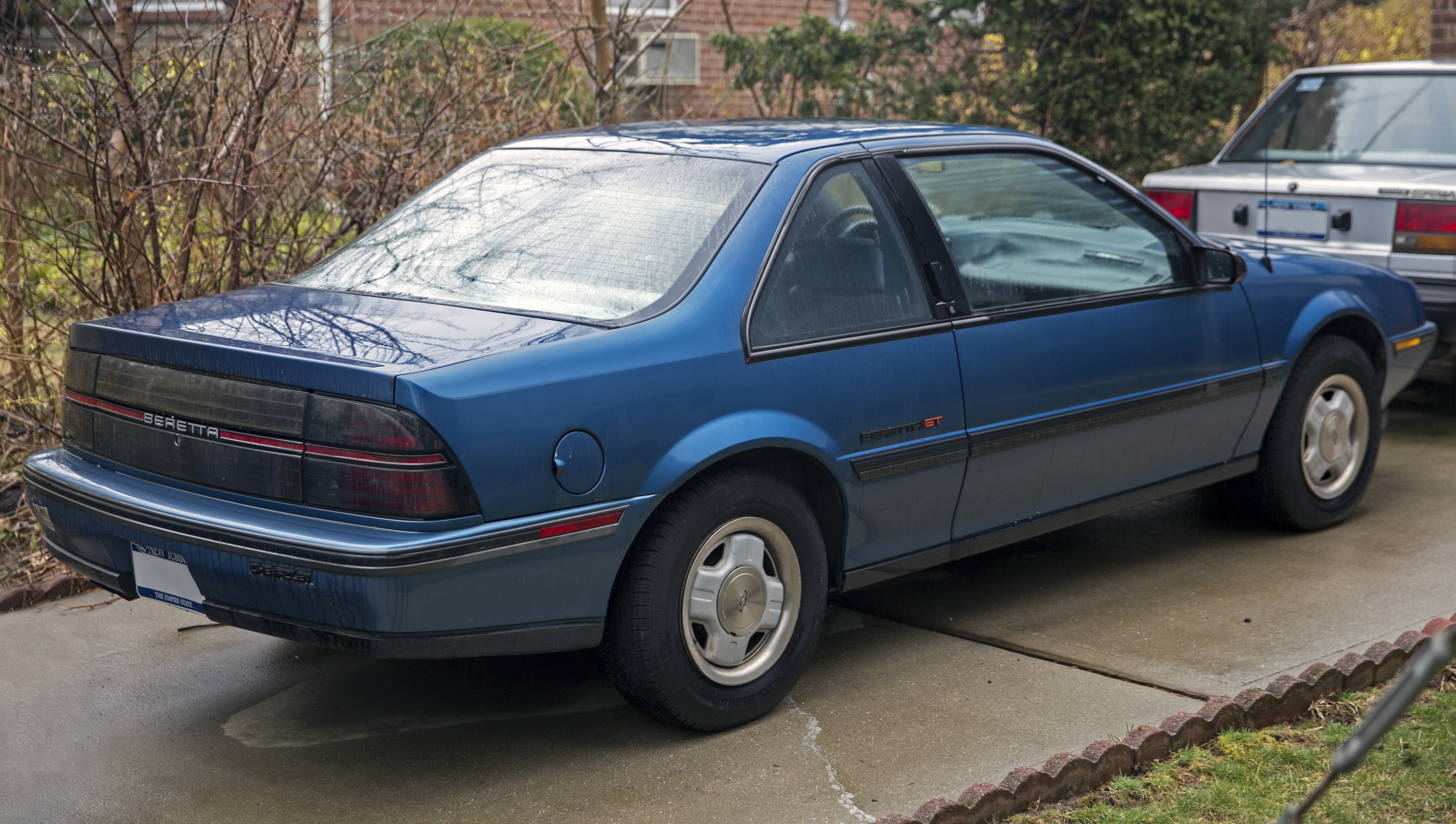
1988 Beretta GT, rear view

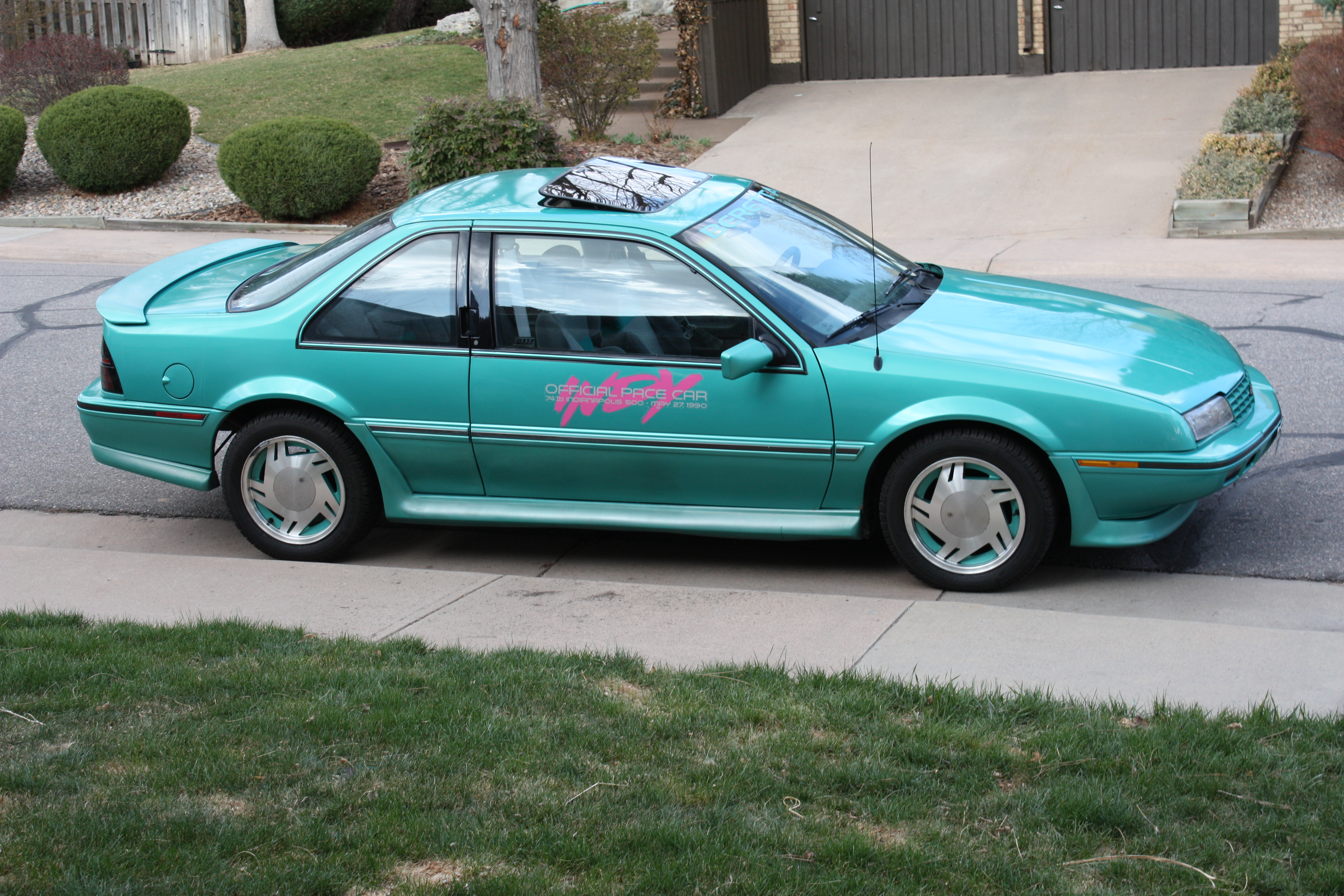
1990 Indianapolis 500 pace car replica

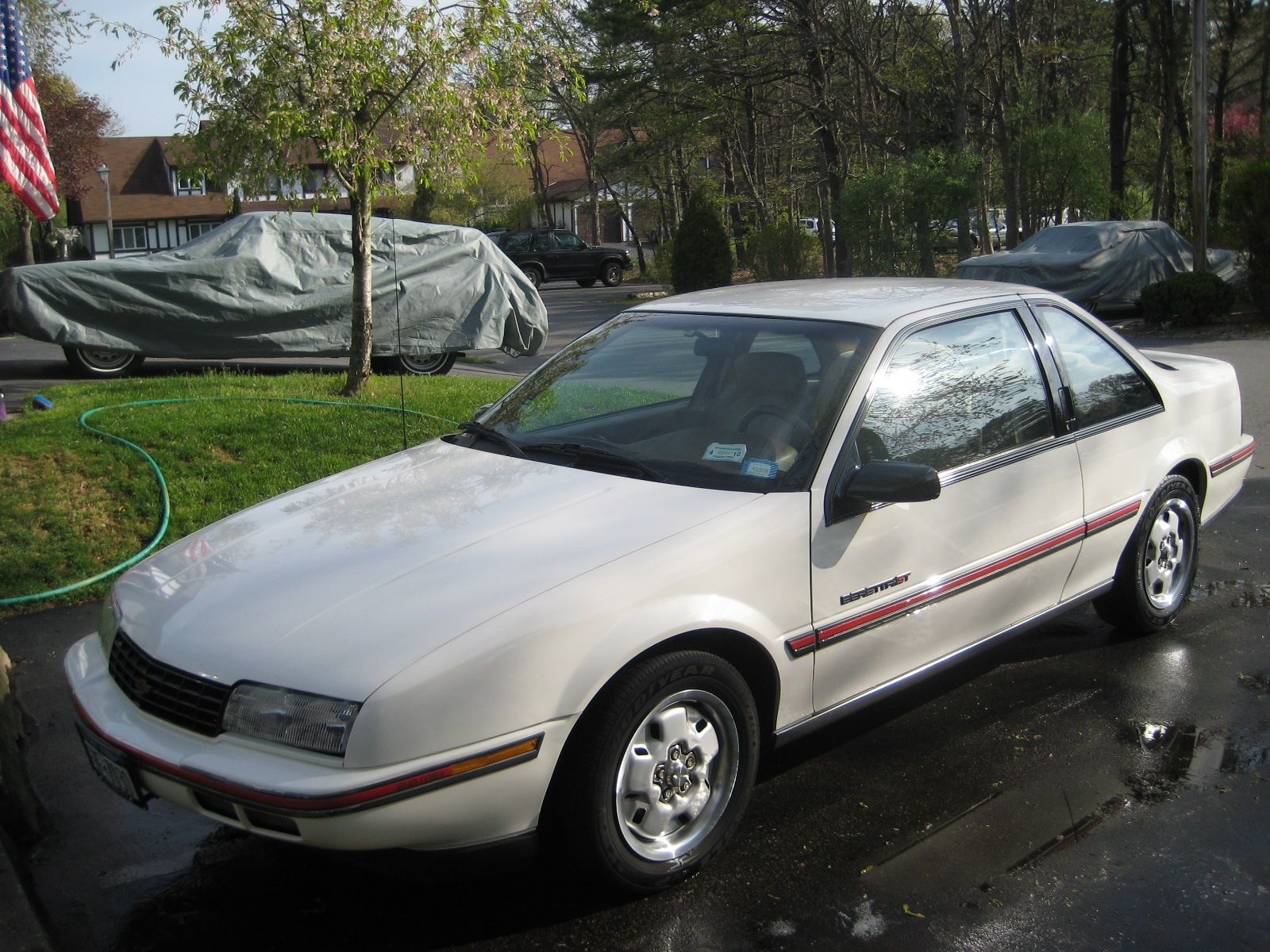
1989 GT

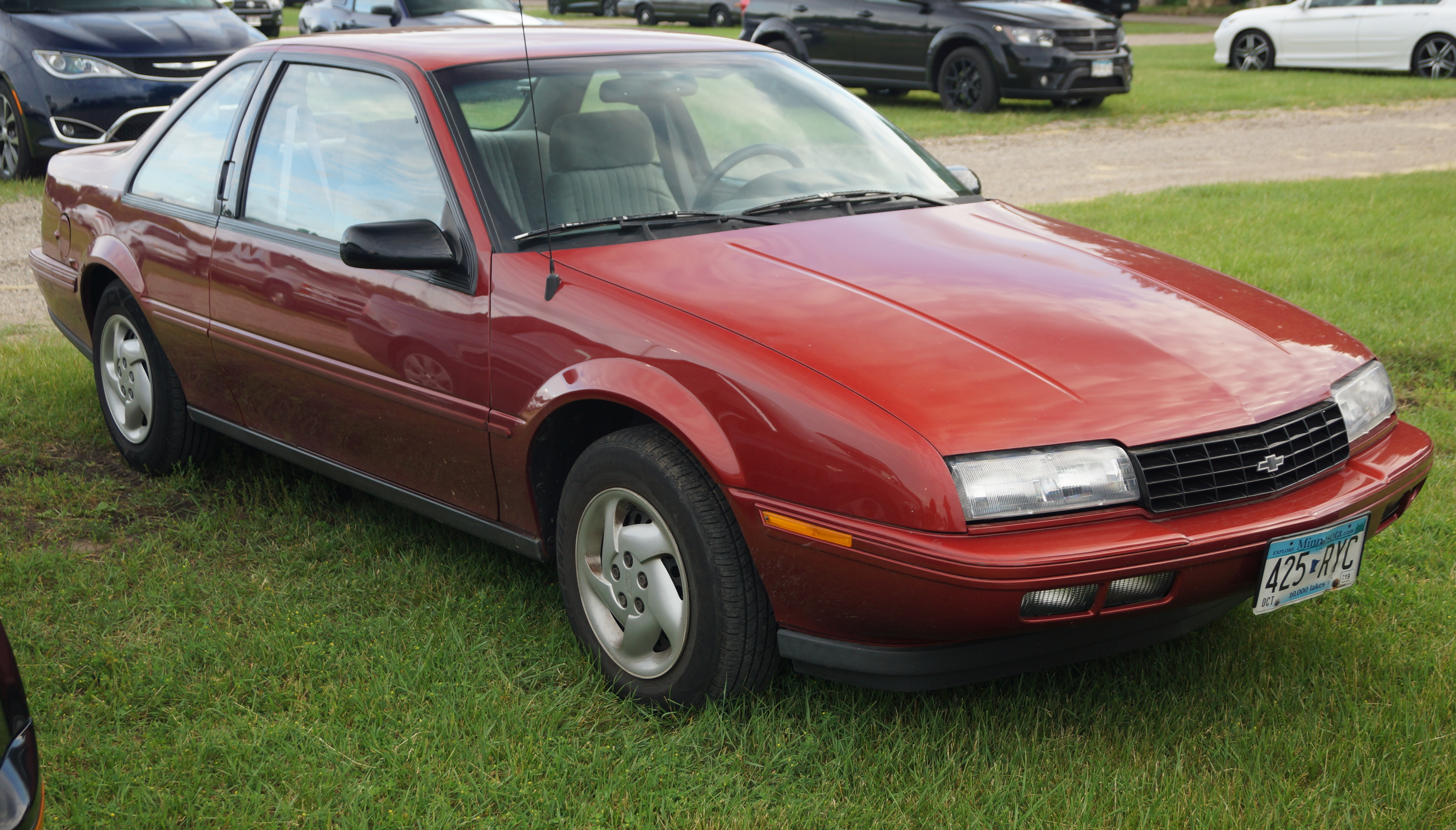
1995 Beretta

== Trademark issue ==
General Motors was sued by Fabbrica d'Armi Pietro Beretta for trademark infringement involving their use of the Beretta name for a car. The suit was settled out of court in 1989; GM and Beretta exchanged symbolic gifts: a Beretta GTU coupe and a pair of Beretta shotguns. General Motors donated US$500,000 to a Beretta-sponsored charity which was also affiliated with the GM Cancer Research Foundation.

== Motorsport ==
A Chevrolet Beretta, fitted with a splayed valve, 4.5 liter 90-degree V6 engine, won the Trans Am Series championship in 1990.
