= Chevrolet Corsica =

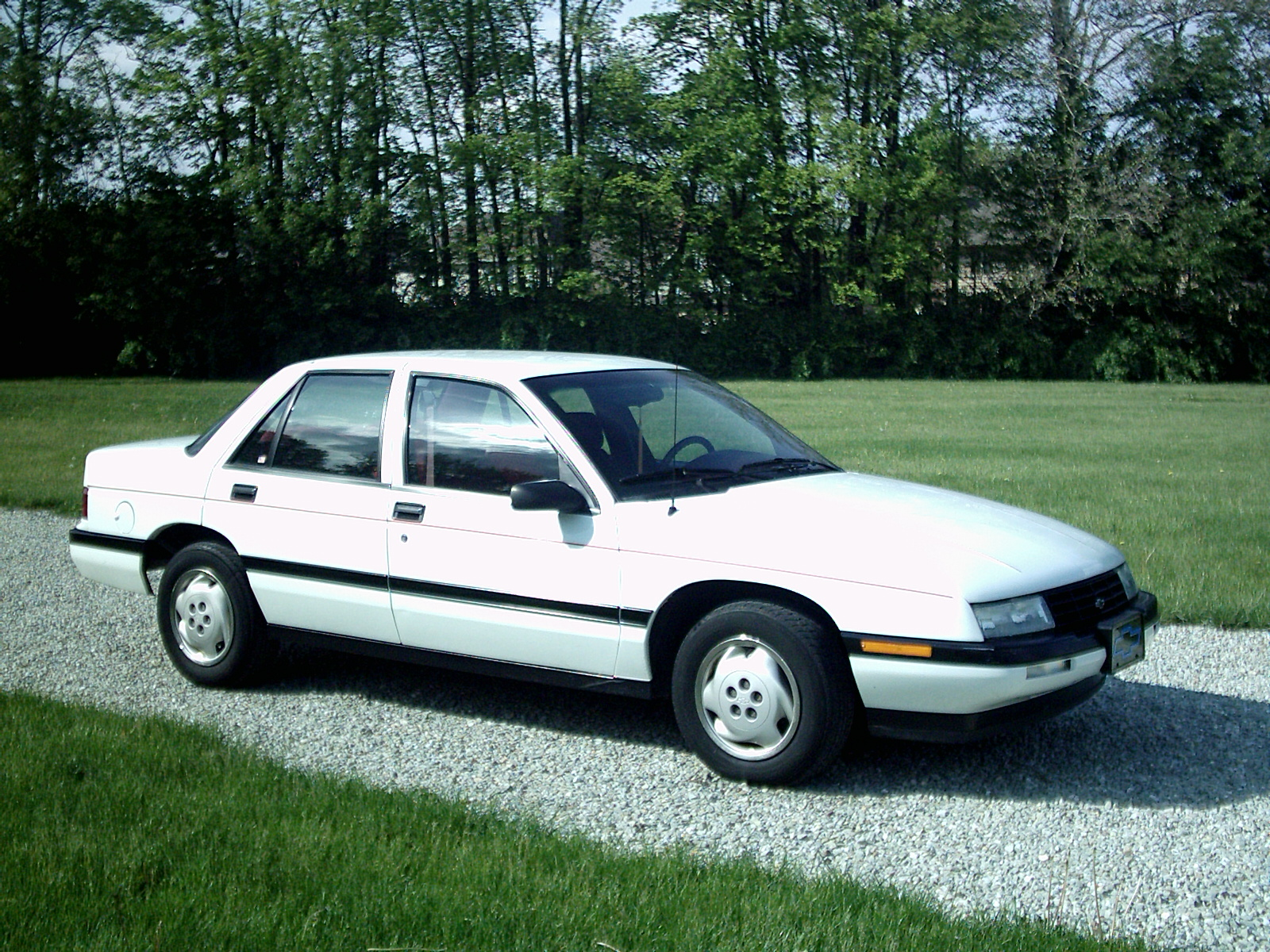

Overview
- Manufacturer: Chevrolet
- Also called: Pontiac Tempest (Canada, 1987–1991)
- Production: 1987–June 1996
- Model years: 1987–1996
- Assembly: United States: Wilmington, Delaware; United States: Linden, New Jersey
- Designer: Irv Rybicki (1983)

Body and chassis
- Class: Compact car (C)
- Body style: 4-door sedan 5-door hatchback
- Layout: Transverse front-engine, front-wheel drive
- Platform: L-body
- Related: Pontiac Tempest; Chevrolet Beretta

Powertrain
- Engine: 2.0 L LL8 I4; 2.2 L LM3/LN2 I4; 2.8 L LB6 V6; 3.1 L LH0/L82 V6
- Transmission: 3-speed 3T40 automatic 4-speed 4T40-E automatic 4-speed 4T60-E automatic 5-speed manual

Dimensions
- Wheelbase: 103.4 in (2,626 mm)
- Length: 183.4 in (4,658 mm) (1987–1993); 183.5 in (4,661 mm) (1994–1996)
- Width: 68.2 in (1,732 mm) (1987–1993); 68.5 in (1,740 mm) (1994–1996)
- Height: 53.8 in (1,367 mm) (1987–1993); 54.2 in (1,377 mm) (1994–1996)

Chronology
- Predecessor: Chevrolet Citation
- Successor: Chevrolet Malibu

The Chevrolet Corsica is a compact car that was produced by Chevrolet from the 1987 to 1996 model years. Taking its name from the French Mediterranean island, the Corsica was the successor of the Chevrolet Citation. Sold initially as a four-door sedan, a 5-door hatchback was offered from the 1989 to 1991 model years; the Chevrolet Beretta two-door coupe was sold as its companion model line for its entire production. The model line was sold in the United States, Canada, and the Middle East; in Canada, Pontiac sold the Corsica as the Pontiac Tempest from 1987 to 1991.

Produced for a single generation, the Corsica utilized the GM L platform. Developed by Chevrolet (in tandem with the Oldsmobile-designed N platform) in an effort to start over from the X-car architecture, the L platform again used front-wheel drive, but in place of downsizing, GM expanded upon its subcompact J car line.

For its entire production, the Corsica was produced alongside the Beretta by Wilmington Assembly (Wilmington, Delaware) and Linden Assembly (Linden, New Jersey). For 1997, Chevrolet replaced the Corsica (but not the Beretta) with the Chevrolet Malibu.

== Year-to-year changes ==
=== 1987–1989 ===
The Corsica was first sold as a fleet car to rental agencies and large companies in 1987, prior to mainstream release. The Corsica and Beretta were the second best-selling passenger cars in America in calendar year 1988, right behind the Ford Escort. Much of the suspension components were borrowed from the J-body Chevrolet Cavalier, and the chassis was an extension of that of the J-body, but modeled with similar proportions to the N-body. The L-body platform however, was engineered by Chevrolet rather than Oldsmobile. The car was equipped with either the 2.0 L TBI OHV I4 from the Cavalier, or the 2.8 L MPFI OHV V6 from the Chevrolet Celebrity. The base Corsica's door handles were colored silver, while the Corsica LT/LTZ had black-colored handles. Some earlier models had a column shifter with a handbrake between the front seats, an uncommon configuration for most compact cars of the time. A 5-door hatchback model was introduced for 1989, as was an LTZ performance package that included many suspension parts from the Beretta. A rare XT trim included all the performance parts from the LTZ trim as well as a leather interior, special body kit and spoiler package designed for GM by a third party supplier.

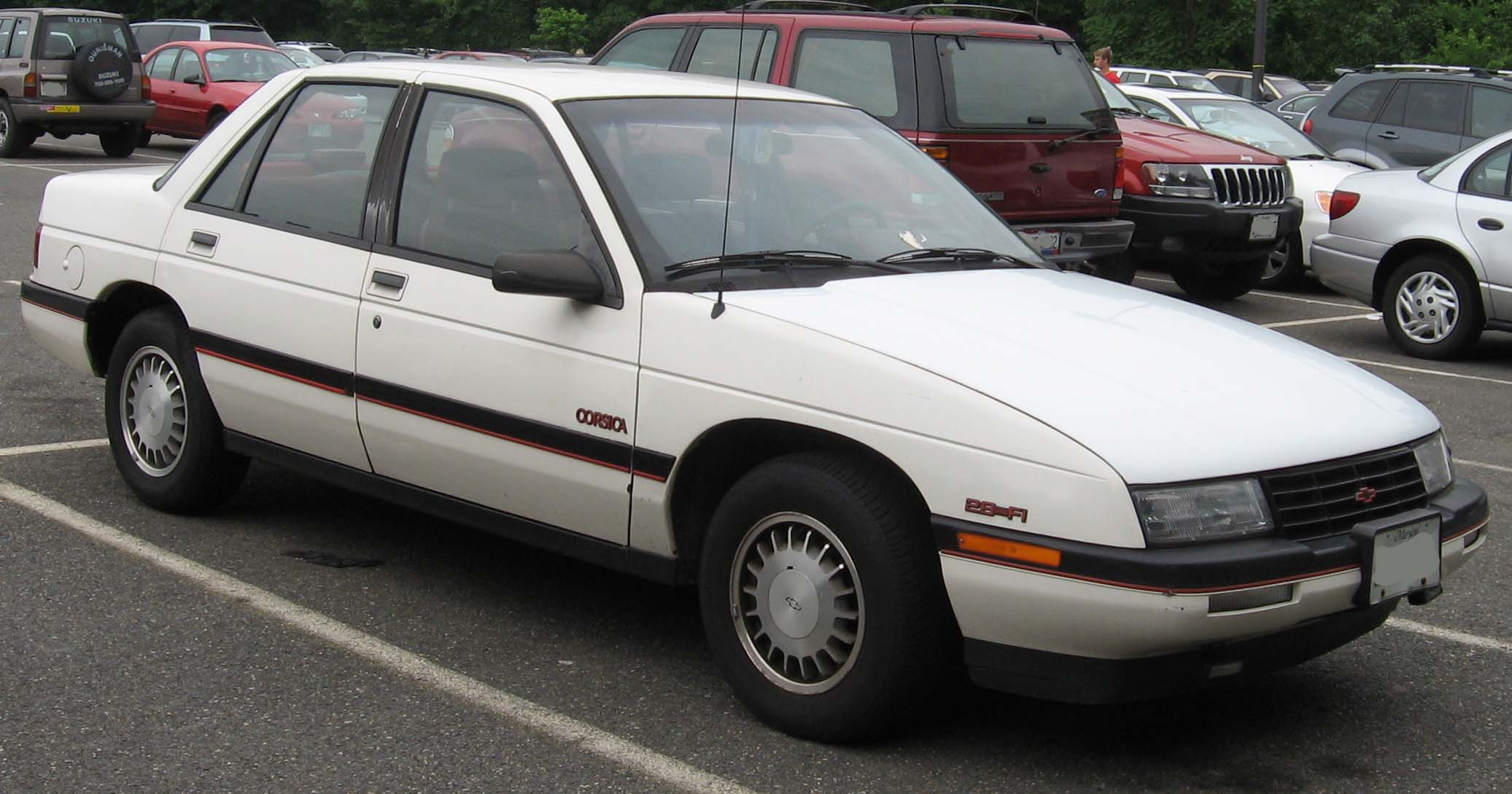
1987–1989 Chevrolet Corsica LT

=== 1990 ===
The base model Corsica was dropped, leaving the LT and LTZ. Both engines offered were increased in displacement. The Corsica now either used the same 2.2 L 4-cylinder engine and 3-speed automatic transmission as the Cavalier, or the 3.1 L V6 and 3-speed automatic from the Lumina. Minor changes were made to the interior, mostly around the driver controls.

=== 1991 ===
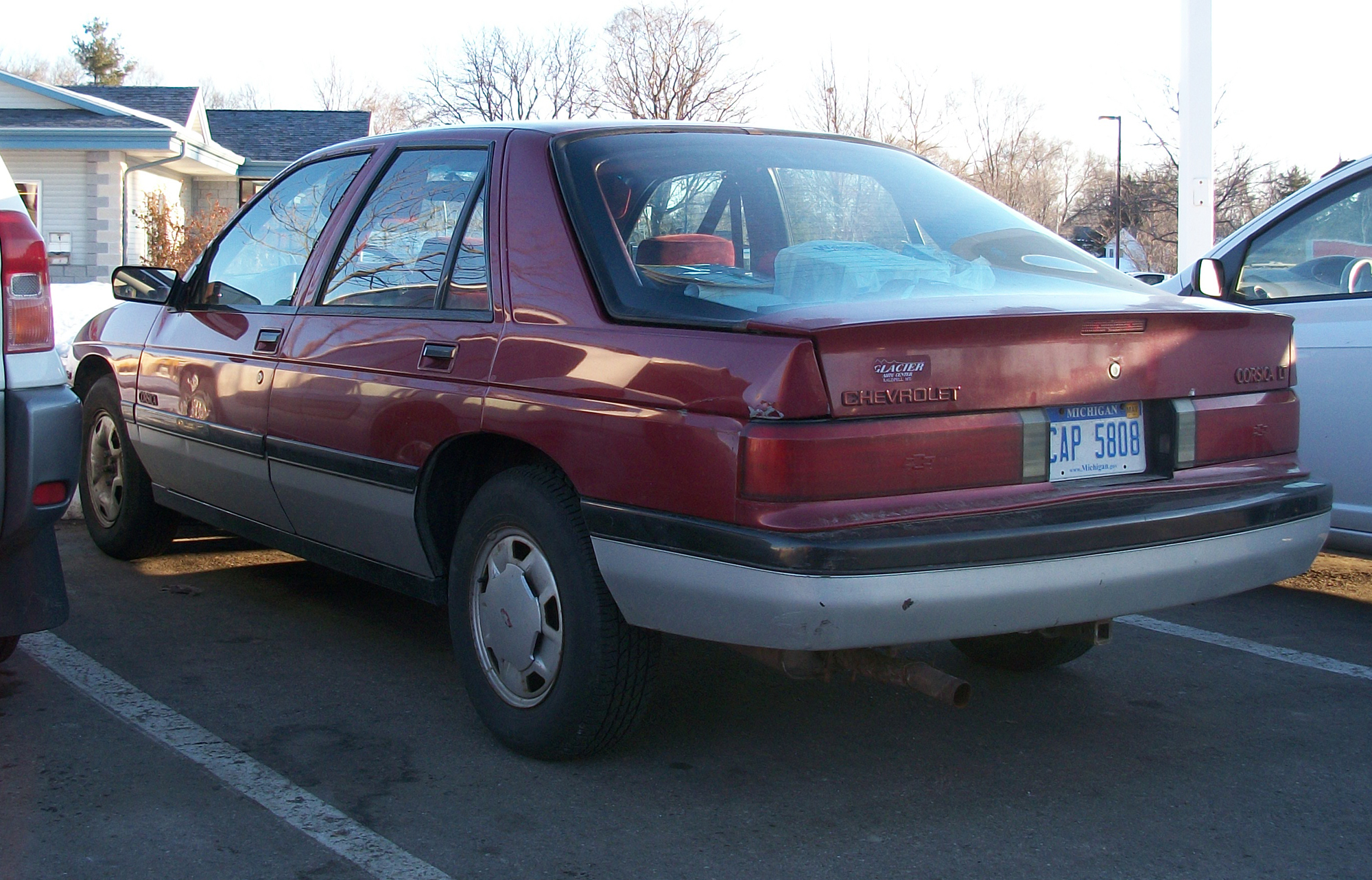
1989–1991 Chevrolet Corsica 5-door

For 1991 the Corsica received an extensively updated interior with a standard driver's side airbag and cup holders. The front seatbelts were moved from the doors to the B-pillars. The taillights also received a redesign, going from smooth to ridged. This would also be the last year for the five-door hatchback.

=== 1992 ===
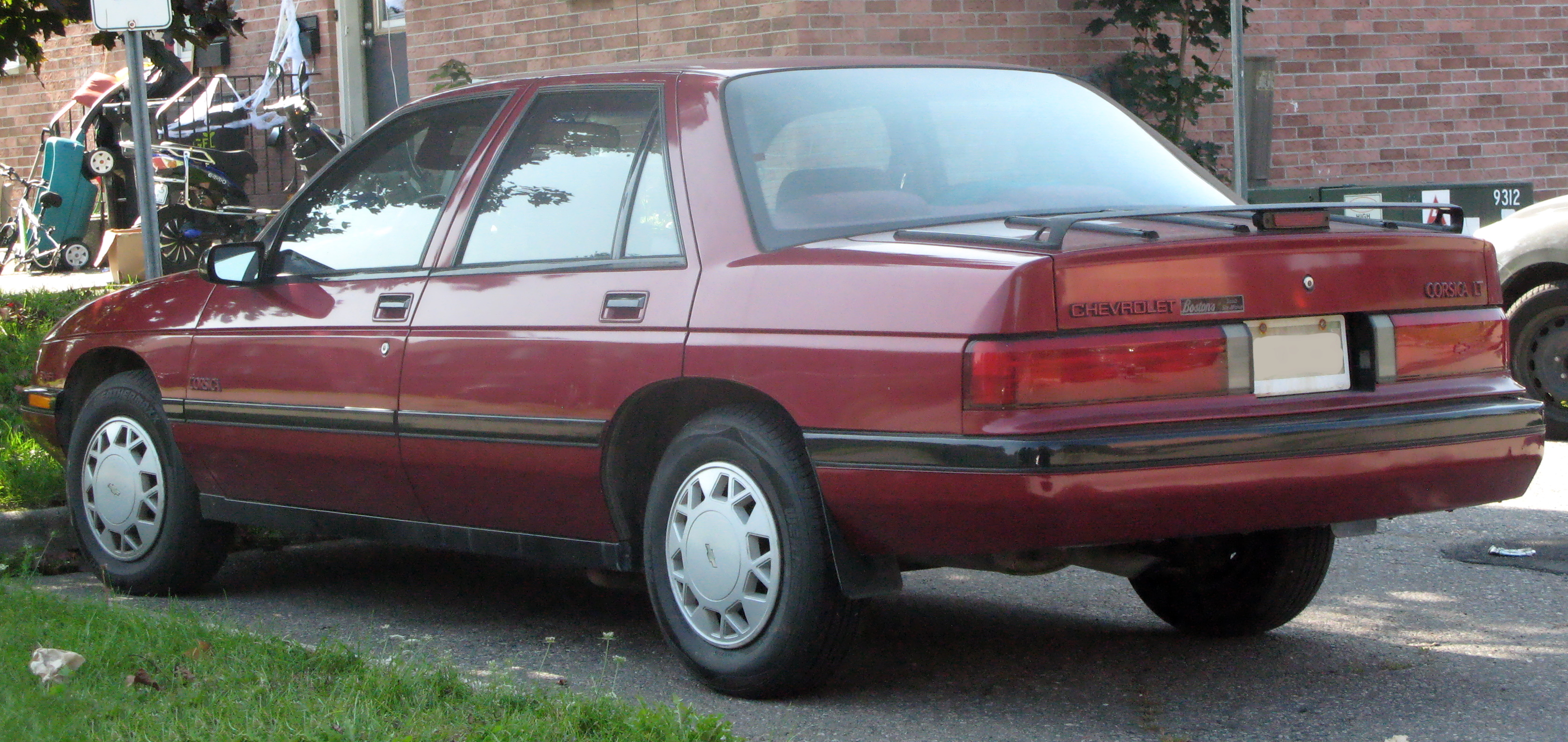
Rear view (1991 Corsica LT)

The only trim level was the LT. The manual transmission was dropped for the V6; it remained available for the four-cylinder engine, although it was only available through special order (few of which ever took place). The 2.2 L OHV engine was now upgraded with sequential fuel-injection (SFI) in the Corsica, unlike the version in the Cavalier which used multi-point fuel injection (MPFI).

=== 1993 ===
On automatic transmission vehicles, a shift interlock, which required the brake pedal to be applied before the transmission could be taken out of the park position, as well as a low oil level light was added. The 3.1 L V6 equipped cars also lost the "3.1L Multi-Port V6" fender badge.

=== 1994 ===
The LT model took the place of the base model once again. The 2.2 L engine's power output was increased to 120 hp. The 3.1 L V6 was replaced with the updated Gen III "3100-series" engine (Option code L82) with SFI and an output of 160 hp along with an OBD-1.5 System. This new OBD system was not compatible with either OBD-I or OBD-II but included some features from both systems.

The air conditioning system was upgraded to use R-134a refrigerant, replacing the environmentally-harmful R-12.

The 3-speed automatic transmission on V6 models was replaced with a 4-speed electronically controlled automatic transmission with overdrive, and lubricated with 100,000 mile long-life fluid. The 2.2 L engine retained the same 3-speed automatic, but the 4-speed automatic could be special ordered. The front seat belts were moved from the B-pillars to the doors. The manual transmission was also dropped for all US Corsicas this model year, due to lack of consumer demand, although many export models and the Beretta still retained this option.

=== 1995 ===
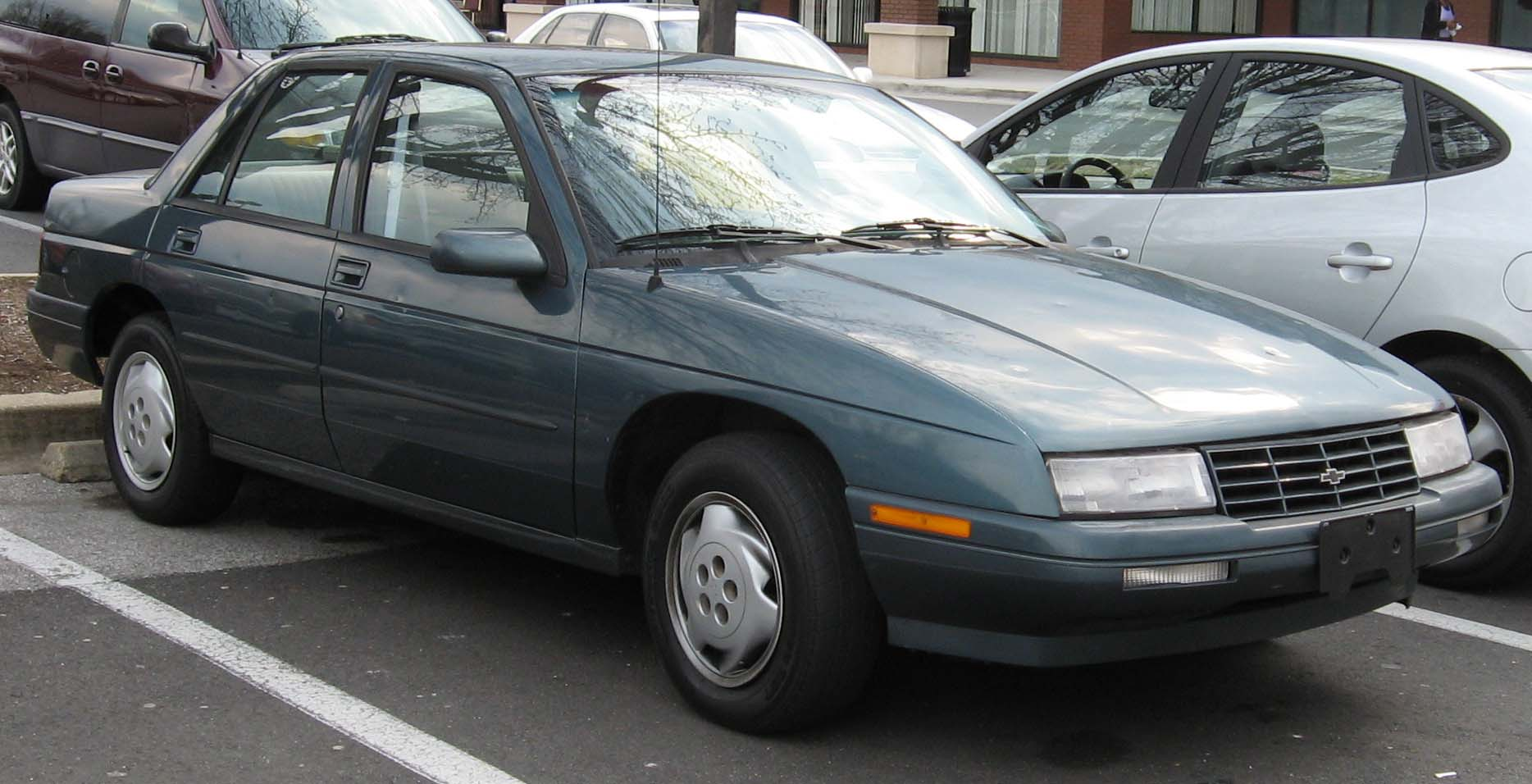
1995–1996 Chevrolet Corsica

The Corsica became the first American car to be equipped with daytime running lights as a standard feature. A new Corsica logo was introduced along with other minor cosmetic exterior changes, such as the introduction of body-colored mirrors, side moldings, and grille. Taillights were also updated, using the Tempest's design from years prior. The car also received a revised rear suspension, similar to that of the then-newly redesigned Cavalier. This slightly reduced the "floatiness" of the ride which occurred with earlier models. All Corsicas now came with Dex-Cool engine coolant. The car also received a new tire size, 195/70R14 for longer tire life and better handling.

=== 1996 ===
The Corsica was converted fully to OBD-II. GM discontinued the Corsica and the Chevrolet Beretta after the 1996 model year, due to safety standards in 1997 that would have required a total redesign of these cars, and competition from the similarly sized redesigned Chevrolet Cavalier for compact car sales. The Corsica was replaced by the larger Chevrolet Malibu for the 1997 model year.

Chevrolet Corsica production figures
	Sedan	5-door hatch	Pontiac Tempest	Total
1987	8,973	-		8,973
1988	291,163	-		291,163
1989	204,589	26,578		231,167
1990	181,520	13,001		194,521
1991	187,981	2,525	1,208	191,714
1992	144,833	-	877	145,710
1993	148,232	-	-	148,232
1994	143,296	-	-	143,296
1995	142,073	-	-	142,073
1996	148,652	-	-	148,652
Total	1,601,312	42,104		1,643,416

=== Engines ===
Type	Model years	Power	Torque	Notes
1,991 cc (121.5 cu in) 2.0L OHV I4	1987–1989	90 bhp (67 kW)	109 lb⋅ft (148 N⋅m)	
2,837 cc (173.1 cu in) 2.8L LB6 OHV V6	1987–1989	130 bhp (97 kW)	170 lb⋅ft (230 N⋅m)	
2,189 cc (133.6 cu in) 2.2L OHV I4	1990–1991	95 bhp (71 kW)	120 lb⋅ft (163 N⋅m)	
2,189 cc (133.6 cu in) 2.2L OHV I4	1992–1993	110 bhp (82 kW)	130 lb⋅ft (176 N⋅m)	
2,189 cc (133.6 cu in) 2.2L OHV I4	1994–1996	120 bhp (89 kW)	140 lb⋅ft (190 N⋅m)	
3,136 cc (191.4 cu in) 3.1L Gen II	1990–1993	140 bhp (100 kW)	180 lb⋅ft (244 N⋅m)	
3,136 cc (191.4 cu in) 3.1L Gen III	1994–1996	160 bhp (120 kW)	185 lb⋅ft (251 N⋅m)	

Notes:

- Both the 2.8 L V6 and 2.0 L I4 received a longer stroke crankshaft in the 1990 model year, respectively increasing their displacements to 3.1 L and 2.2 L.
- In the 1992 model year, sequential fuel injection replaced throttle-body injection on the I4 and in 1994 it replaced MPFI on the V6 models. The updated OBD system is sometimes referred to as OBD 1.5.
