= Getrag 282 transmission =

5-speed manual transaxle

1990 Getrag 282 internals

The Getrag 282 transmission was a 5-speed manual transaxle designed by Getrag for Chevrolet. It is sometimes referred to as the Muncie 282 or the Muncie Getrag 282, as the transmission was manufactured by the Muncie, Indiana manual transmission plant. It has been used in various front-wheel drive transverse engine applications including the Chevrolet Cavalier, Pontiac Sunbird, Pontiac Grand Am, Chevrolet Beretta and the Oldsmobile Achieva. It was also used in the mid-engined rear-wheel drive Pontiac Fiero. In its later years, the Getrag 282 was manufactured by New Venture Gear and renamed the NVG T550.

== Gear ratios ==
The topic of available gear ratios has been widely debated due to the numerous applications of this transaxle. The 1987 GM Getrag Service Manual confirms that there are at least two versions of the Getrag 282. According to the manual, the two versions were sold under 5 different part numbers based on body and engine usage. The first version, Regular Production Option (RPO) code MG2 was used for all GM V6 applications (FWD and the RWD Fiero) and the second version, RPO code MG1, was used for the 2.0 L turbocharged engine used by Pontiac and Buick. Gear ratios are given below, as taken from the GM Product Service Training Manual.

MG2 and MG1 ratios:

- 1st gear: 3.50:1
- 2nd gear: 2.05:1 (MG2), 2.19:1 (MG1)
- 3rd gear: 1.38:1
- 4th gear: 0.94:1
- 5th gear: 0.72:1
- Reverse: 3.41:1
- Final drive ratio: 3.61:1

A later version was designed for the Quad 4 High-Output engine, using a 3.50/2.05 1st/2nd, 1.38 3rd, 1.03:1 4th, .80:1 5th, and 3.94:1 final drive.

The Getrag 282 used in Quad 4-equipped 1990 and 1991 Pontiac Grand Prix and Oldsmobile Cutlass Supremes is rumored to use a 3.77/2.19 1st/2nd gear while retaining the 3.61:1 final drive ratio. An export-only version is confirmed to have been built for use in Oldsmobile Silhouette vans sold in the European market as the Pontiac Trans Sport. It was mated to the Quad 4 engine and uses a 3.77/2.19/1.38/1.03/.80/3.94 gearset.

Mixing of gearsets can be achieved due to the similarity between the various transmissions, but some gears must be interchanged in sets. First and second gear are integral to the input shaft and cannot be interchanged independently. All transmissions have a third gear ratio of 1.38:1. However, third and fourth gear are clustered on the counter shaft which was available with two different fourth gear ratios: 1.03:1 or .94:1. Fifth gear is independently interchangeable and available with a .80:1 and .72:1 ratio.
