= Pacer's Auto =

Pacers Auto, Inc.® was a popular, record-setting drag racing team in the early 1950s and 1960s.

Based in Oceanside, New York on Long Island, The Pacers' "Snizek & Dodge Racing Team" made up of co-owners George Snizek as driver, and Charlie Dodge as tuner, were favored by fans and feared by competitors. They always delighted fans with their quarter mile tire-smoking performances from their stout Tasmanian Devil, a Chrysler Hemi-powered 23T Altered Roadster, which set numerous track, class and speed records across the AA/A, CC/FD, AA/FA & A/FD classes.

Pacers Auto, Inc. was a founding member of the CARS Magazine Racing Team campaigning the Tasmanian Devil both on gas and fuel, as well as, The Pacers Auto "CARS Magazine Special" Top Fuel dragster. They also served as Official Road Test Consultants for Hi-Performance CARS magazine and Speed & Custom magazine and could be seen in many articles in both. They were the east coast distributors of Nitromethane and Methanol (aka Nitro-Alky) racing fuel.

In 2015, the Tasmanian Devil II Tribute AA/FA was acquired by The Pacers and will be making its way around Long Island and the East Coast. It is an active racecar and will be making exhibition runs around the country in 2016.

== Recognition ==
- The Pacers were subjects of Walter Ungerer's 1963 drag racing documentary, "The Tasmanian Devil".
- NHRA Class Record AA/Altered 154.90MPH. Atco, NJ June 16, 1963
- Best Appearing Car & Crew, 1963 NHRA Nationals Indianapolis, IN.
- NHRA Class Record AA/Altered 161.87 MPH @ 9.56 sec. NHRA Nationals, Indianapolis, IN September 3–7, 1964.
- Best Appearing Car of Meet NHRA 1st Regional Meet of 1965. Cecil County, MD in A/FD Class 8.81 sec.
- NHRA Class Record CC/FD 165.13 MPH @ 9.34 sec. Island Dragway May 22, 1966.
- NHRA Class Record CC/FD 167.59 MPH. Sanford Dragway, ME. June 19, 1966.
- NHRA "Double-Up Title". The Pacers won Top Fuel Dragster (8.14-166.33) MPH and Super Eliminator Altered (9.67-137.61) titles, at the York US-30, PA. July 17, 1966.
- Div. 1 World Championship Series Super Eliminator Points Champion CC/FD 1966.
- NHRA Div. 1 World Championship Series Top Fuel Eliminator Points (2nd place 400 points) Pacers CARS Magazine Racing Team AA/FD August 21, 1966.
- In 1968, Snizek, Dodge & Qualliotine created and began building Sand Cat "The Cat with Scat" Custom Dune Buggies.
- In 1987, Charlie Dodge Hagenmayer helped design the Oldsmobile Aerotech record setting car. (4-cylinder engine, 1000 hp ‘Powered by a highly turbo-charged version of the 2-liter Oldsmobile Quad 4 engine’). A.J. Foyt drove it to a closed course speed record (257.123 mph) setting two records - unlimited engine and under 2 liters (1998 cc).
- In 2007, The Tasmanian Devil II Tribute AA/FA was debuted at the East Coast Drag Times Hall of Fame and made its track debut at the 6th Annual Holley National Hot Rod Reunion at Beech Bend Park in Bowling Green, KY. June 14–15, 2008. The car was built by retired policeman & firefighter, Jerry Joaquin as tribute car to The Pacers "Snizek & Dodge Racing Team" and in memory to those killed on September 11, 2001. The car wears the number 343.
- In 2008, the Pacers Auto, Inc. team of George Snizek, Charlie Dodge Hagenmayer, Otto Qualliotine, and Ken "KB" Braun were inducted into the East Coast Drag Times Hall of Fame in Henderson, North Carolina.
- In 2009, the team of George Snizek and "Charlie Dodge" Hagenmayer were inducted into the National Nostalgia Drag Racing Association's Legion of Honor hosted by Darwin Doll at the York US-30 Reunion, held annually at the York Expo Center, York Fairgrounds in Pennsylvania.
- In 2010, a new Tasmanian Devil AA/Fuel Altered was recreated to its exact 1965 AA/FA specs by a team of retired professional top fuel drivers from Long Island. The build marked the 50th anniversary of The Pacers' Tasmanian Devil and was accomplished in only 6 months. The project was code named Project Pacers. It was built to participate in the popular nostalgia Cacklefest events that take place around the country. The car won the "Best Original Race Car" award presented by Mirabella Guitars at Raceway Park's 2010 Nostalgia Sumernationals and Funny Car Reunion at Englishtown, NJ July 25, 2010.

== Reference articles ==
Hot Rod Magazine, August 1991, Rear Cover.
Rod Action Magazine, September 1975, The East Remembered, page 9
Cars Magazine, July 1966, Build A C/Stock Record Breaker, cover, page 18–22, 75
Cars Magazine, July 1966, CARS Fueler goes 7.65, cover, page 3
Cars Magazine, June 1966, CARS Builds a Fueler - Part III Body Construction, pages 36–40
Cars Magazine, June 1965, Setting up a CM/SP Sting Ray
Rodder and Super Stock Magazine', March 1965, Bella Rita I, cover, pages 29–32
Rodder & Super Stock Magazine, March 1965, Comet Cyclone
Hot Rod Magazine, July 1965, Tazmanian Devil, pages 48–49
Drag Racing Magazine, January 1965, Five Big Days, pages 21, 65
Cars Magazine, October 1964, Cars Goes Dragging, cover, pages 30–33
Hot Rod Magazine, November 1964, National Record Chart, pages 79 & 80
Hot Rod Magazine, December 1964, Fast'N'Fancy by Dick Wells
Science & Mechanics Magazine, May 1964, Ten Hottest Hot Rods, cover, pages 44–45
Hot Rod Magazine, November 1963, Best Appearing Crew Award, Pacers Auto Car Club, pages 30–31
Rodders Manual, July 1962 Cover
Diggers, Funnies, Gassers & Altereds: Drag Racing's Golden Era by Bob McClurg. Tasmanian Devil AA/A, chapter 3, page 52
