= General Motors N platform =

GM N Platform
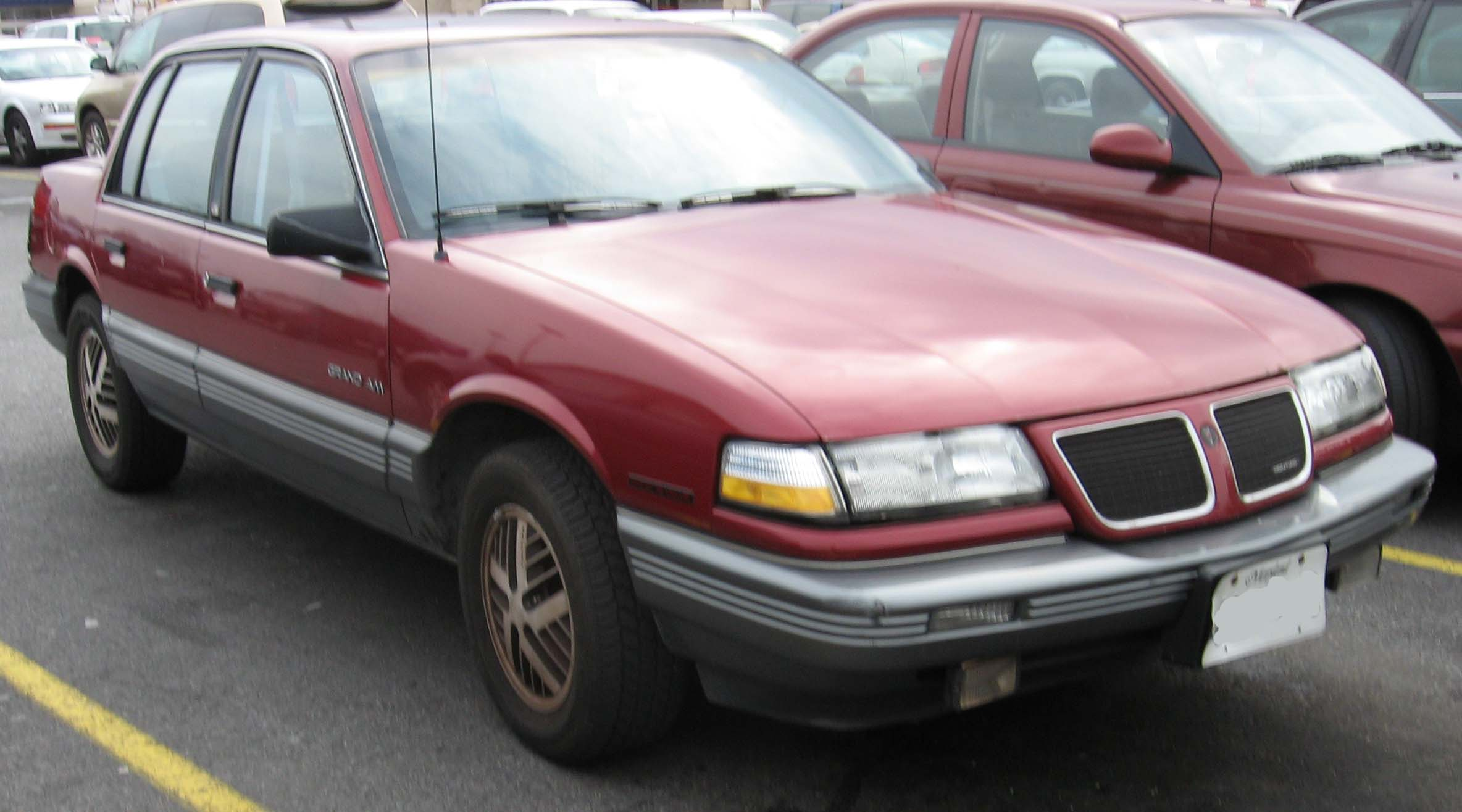

Overview
- Manufacturer: General Motors
- Also called: P-90; GMX130
- Production: 1984–2005

Body and chassis
- Class: Compact platform Mid-size platform
- Layout: FF layout
- Body style(s): 4-door Sedan; 2-door Coupé
- Vehicles: Buick Skylark, Buick Somerset, Chevrolet Malibu/Classic, Oldsmobile Achieva, Oldsmobile Alero, Oldsmobile Calais/Cutlass Calais, Oldsmobile Cutlass, Pontiac Grand Am
- Related: GM J platform GM L platform

Powertrain
- Engine(s): 122 I4; Ecotec I4; Iron Duke I4; Family II engine I4; Quad-4 I4; 60° V6; Buick V6
- Transmission(s): 3-speed THM125 automatic 3-speed 3T40 automatic 4-speed 4T60-E automatic 4-speed 4T40-E automatic 4-speed 4T45-E automatic 5-speed Getrag 282 manual 5-speed Getrag F23 manual 5-speed Isuzu manual

Dimensions
- Wheelbase: 103.4 in (2,626 mm); 107 in (2,718 mm)

Chronology
- Predecessor: GM X platform GM L platform
- Successor: GM Epsilon platform

The General Motors N platform (commonly called the N-body or N car) was a front-wheel drive compact automotive platform produced from 1984 to 2005. The GM N platform was based on the GM J-Body and replaced the GM X platform.

== First generation ==
The N body was introduced in late 1984 for the 1985 model year. Initially, offered as the Pontiac Grand Am, Oldsmobile Calais and Buick Somerset coupes, GM positioned them as premium models at an affordable price. Standard in all models was the 2.5 liter "Iron Duke" 4 cylinder engine developed by the Pontiac Motor Division. Optional was the Buick built 3.0 liter V6 with multi-port fuel injection. All models could have a 5 speed manual or 3 speed automatic. During the 1986 model year, four door models were added to all three brand entries. The N platform was very similar to the GM L platform; however, the first generation N cars were engineered by Oldsmobile while the L cars were engineered by Chevrolet. The first generation used a twist-beam rear suspension and MacPherson struts in front, and featured a 103.4 in (2,626 mm) wheelbase.

The N platform was used for the following vehicles:

- 1985–1991 Pontiac Grand Am
- 1985–1991 Oldsmobile Calais
- 1985–1987 Buick Somerset
- 1986–1991 Buick Skylark

== Second generation ==
For the 1992 model year, General Motors heavily modified all of their N-Body offerings. The Oldsmobile Cutlass Calais was dropped in favor of the new Achieva, while the Buick Skylark and Pontiac Grand Am nameplates continued. In addition to new styling, this generation was longer and carried more distinctive sheet metal for each brand. The second generation N-Body continued until 1998 when it was replaced by the third and final generation.

- 1992–1998 Pontiac Grand Am
- 1992–1998 Oldsmobile Achieva
- 1992–1998 Buick Skylark

== Third generation (GMX130) ==
In 1997 and 1998 General Motors consolidated the 2nd generation N platform with the GM A platform (FWD) and GM L platform during the corporately engineered P-90 project which became known as GMX130. This automotive platform featured fully independent suspension and a wheelbase of 107 in (270 cm). This was the last vehicle with significant engineering involvement of Oldsmobile and also the last one produced at the Lansing Car Assembly plant on April 29, 2004. A mid-size version spawned the 1997-2003 Chevrolet Malibu & Oldsmobile Cutlass of 1997–99, including the 2004–05 Chevrolet Classic.

The GMX130 platform underpinned the following vehicles:

- 1999–2004 Oldsmobile Alero
- 1999–2005 Pontiac Grand Am
- 1997–1999 Oldsmobile Cutlass
- 1997–2003 Chevrolet Malibu
- 2004–2005 Chevrolet Classic (a previous-generation Malibu sold to fleet buyers)

The GMX130 was replaced by the Epsilon platform for 2006.

== See also ==
- List of General Motors platforms
