= Pontiac Sunfire =

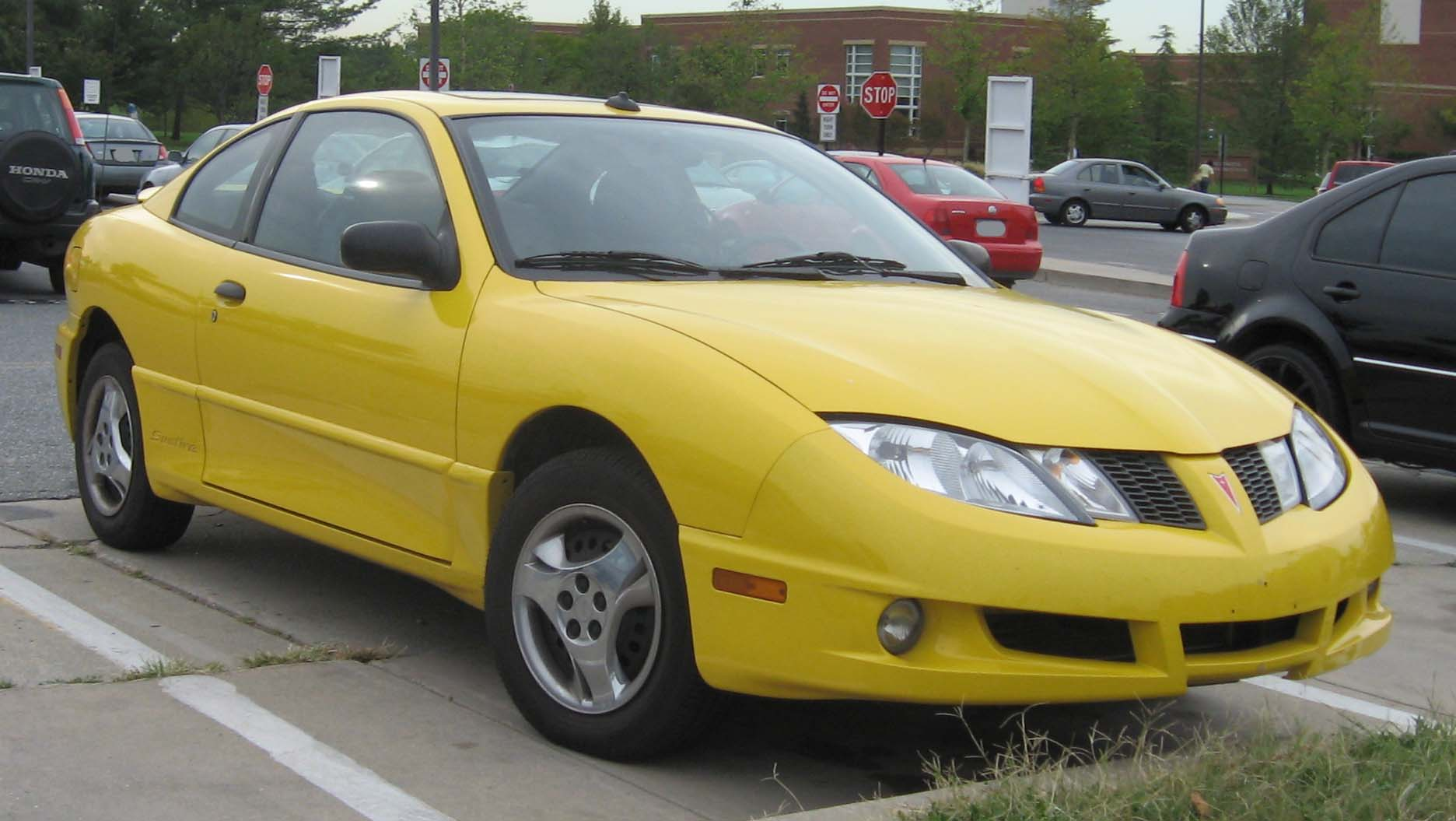

Overview
- Manufacturer: Pontiac (General Motors)
- Production: 1994–2005
- Model years: 1995–2005
- Assembly: Lansing, Michigan, United States (convertible only); Lordstown, Ohio, United States; Ramos Arizpe, Coahuila, Mexico

Body and chassis
- Class: Compact/sport Compact
- Body style: 2-door convertible 2-door coupe 4-door sedan
- Layout: FF layout
- Platform: J-body
- Related: Chevrolet Cavalier

Powertrain
- Engine: 2.2 L LN2 OHV I4; 2.2 L L61 DOHC I4; 2.3 L LD2 DOHC I4; 2.4 L LD9 DOHC I4
- Transmission: 5-speed manual 3/4-speed automatic

Dimensions
- Wheelbase: 104.1 in (2,644 mm)
- Length: 1995–97 Sedan & 2000–05 Coupe: 182 in (4,623 mm); 1998–99 Sedan: 181.7 in (4,615 mm); 1995–99 Coupe & Convertible: 181.9 in (4,620 mm); 2000–02 Sedan: 181.8 in (4,618 mm); 2003–05 Sedan: 183.2 in (4,653 mm)
- Width: Convertible & 1995–97 Coupe: 67.4 in (1,712 mm); 1995–97 Sedan: 67.3 in (1,709 mm); 1998–2005 Coupe & Convertible: 68.4 in (1,737 mm); Sedan: 67.9 in (1,725 mm)
- Height: 1998–2005 Coupe: 53 in (1,346 mm); 1998–2005 Sedan: 54.7 in (1,389 mm); 1998–2005 Convertible: 53.7 in (1,364 mm); 1995–97 Coupe: 53.2 in (1,351 mm); 1995–97 Sedan: 54.8 in (1,392 mm); 1995–97 Convertible: 51.9 in (1,318 mm)
- Curb weight: 2,605 lb (1,182 kg)

Chronology
- Predecessor: Pontiac Sunbird
- Successor: Pontiac G5

The Pontiac Sunfire is a compact car by Pontiac that was introduced for the 1995 model year to replace the Sunbird. Not only was the name changed, but dramatic styling changes were included as well. The new styling was shared with the redesigned Chevrolet Cavalier. The J platform was updated structurally to meet more stringent safety standards for the 1996 model year.

The Pontiac Sunfire went through two facelifts in its 11-year run: a small redesign in 2000 featuring the heavy plastic cladding look that was prevalent with Pontiac at the time, and a more streamlined update in 2003. In the US, the coupe was the only model available from 2003 to 2005. The sedan continued to be sold in Canada and Mexico until the end of production on June 22, 2005. GM replaced the Sunfire with the G5 for the 2006 model year in Canada and the 2007 model year in the United States.

== Technical ==
- 1995 – 2.3 L (138 cu in) Quad 4 (RPO: LD2) I4, 150 hp (116 kW) and 150 lb⋅ft (203 N⋅m)
- 1995–1997 2.2 L (134 cu in) 2200 (RPO: LN2) I4, 120 hp (89 kW) and 140 lb⋅ft (190 N⋅m)
- 1998–2002 2.2 L (134 cu in) 2200 (RPO: LN2) I4, 115 hp (86 kW) and 135 lb⋅ft (183 N⋅m)
- 1996–2002 – 2.4 L (146 cu in) Twin Cam (RPO: LD9) I4, 150 hp (112 kW) and 167 lb⋅ft (226 N⋅m)
- 2002–2005 – 2.2 L (134 cu in) Ecotec (RPO: L61) I4, 140 hp (104 kW) and 150 lb⋅ft (203 N⋅m)

The base model had the 2.2 L engine from 1994 until 2002. The GT trim level had an optional, more powerful 2.3 L Quad 4 engine for model year 1995, which was replaced by the 2.4 L LD9 engine for 1996. The 2.3 and 2.4 litre engines were optional in the two- and four-door LS trim level. In 2003, both the 2.2 L and the 2.4 L engines were replaced by the 2.2 L Ecotec engine, and would be the only powertrain available for the remainder of production. The Ecotec engine was also an option for the 2002 model year.

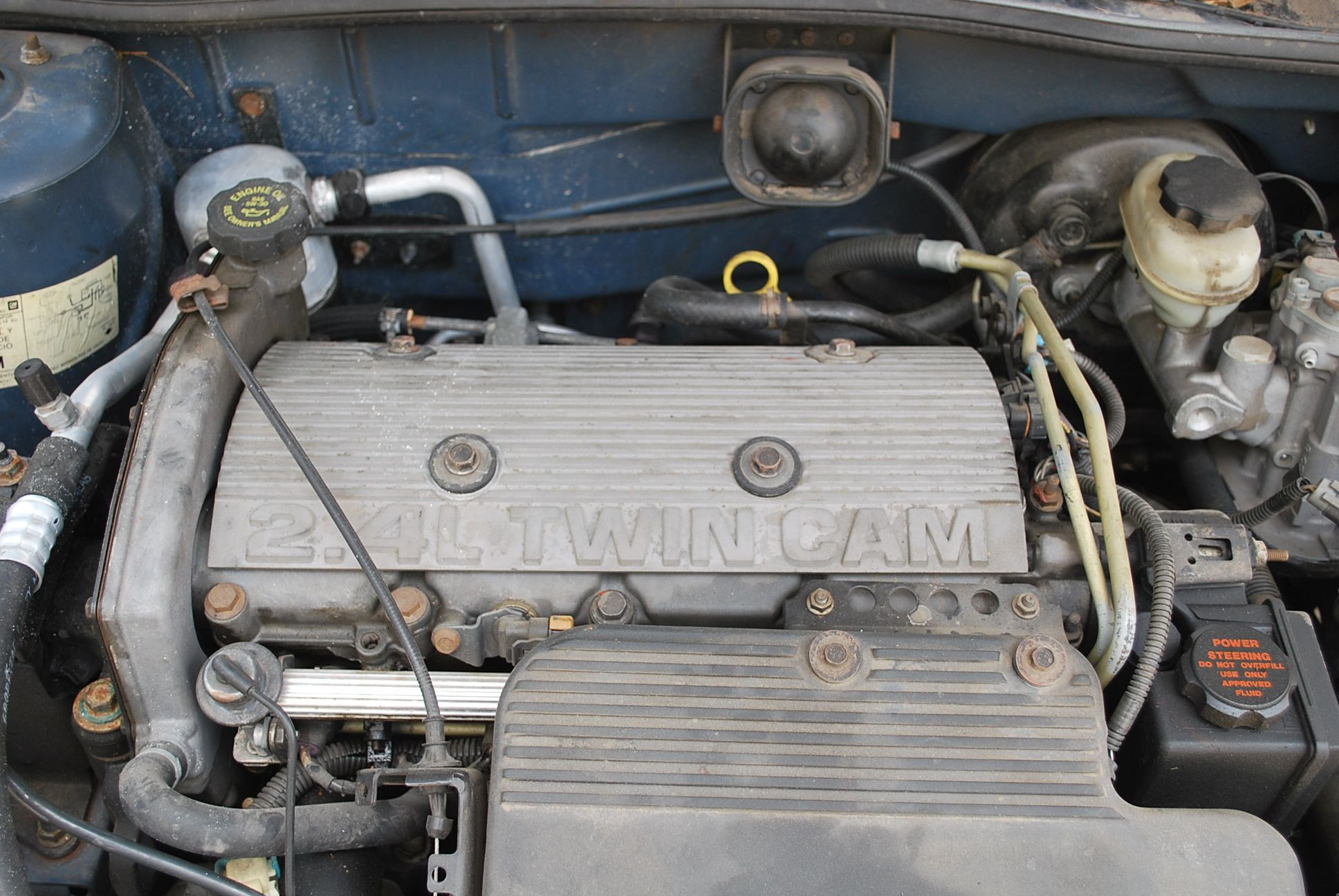
1997 Pontiac Sunfire Twin Cam engine

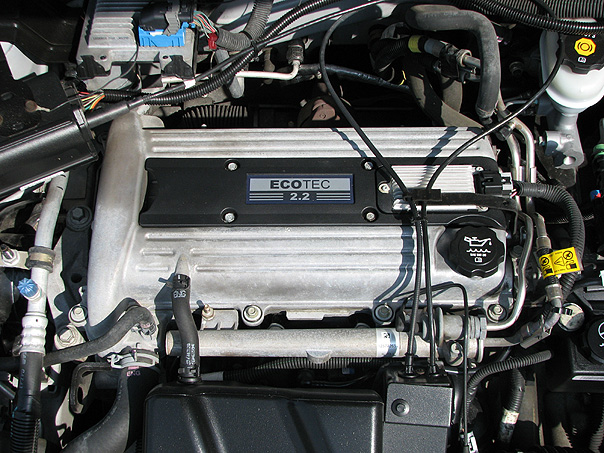
2003 Pontiac Sunfire Ecotec engine

At the time of introduction, the Sunfire was available with a three-speed automatic or a five-speed manual. General Motors had envisioned introducing a new four-speed automatic with the new car, but the company's cash shortage delayed this option until the next year.

== Trim levels ==
The Sunfire could be purchased as a sedan, coupe, or convertible. All three variations came in the standard SE trim level. An upscale GT trim level was available on the coupe and convertible. The GT trim level came standard with the 2.3 litre LD2 engine from 1994 to 1995 or the 2.4 litre LD9 "Twin Cam" engine (1996–2002), 16-inch alloy wheels, dual exhaust, and a more aggressive looking front fascia. The SE trim was the standard for the Sunfire which included the 2.2 litre 2200 OHV Engine. The 2.3/2.4 DOHC Engine was optional. Both the SE and GT trim levels were dropped after the 2002 model year, along with the 2.2 OHV and 2.4 DOHC engines. The 2.2 litre Ecotec was the only available engine as of the 2002 model year.

Originally, the convertible was only in the SE trim level until the 1999 model year where it became only available in the GT trim. The convertible was discontinued after the 2000 model year. All Sunfire convertibles were assembled at the "Genesis" Lansing, Michigan Plant. At its introduction from 1995 until 2001 the rear of the vehicle on coupes has the brand name "Pontiac" between the tail lights, and the trim panel is backlit when the vehicle is on using license plate bulbs installed in the trunk. As vehicles are passed from one owner to another, the panel is often no longer illuminated as new owners are unaware of the feature.

Prices in 1995 ranged from the base sedan at $10,243 (equivalent to $21,600 in 2025) all the way to the $14,195 coupe GT (equivalent to $30,000 in 2025). In 2005 The Pontiac Sunfire had a base price of $15,205 (equivalent to $25,100 in 2025).

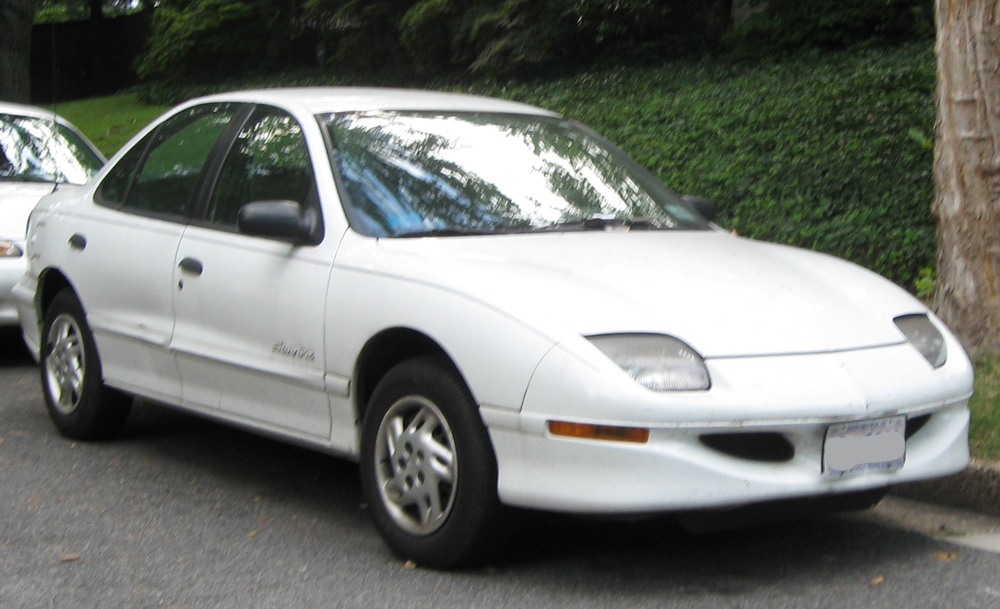
1995–1999 Pontiac Sunfire sedan

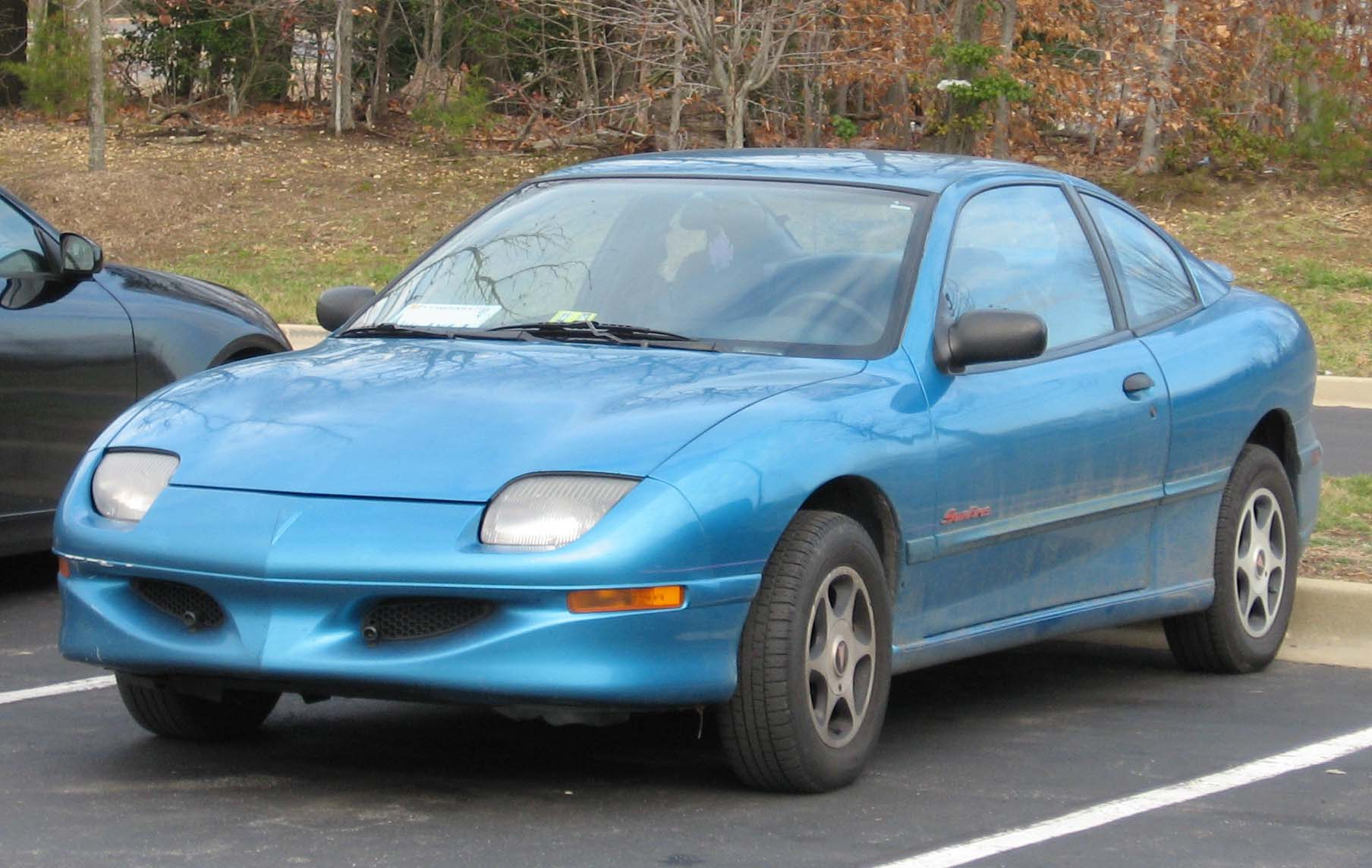
1995–1999 Pontiac Sunfire SE coupe

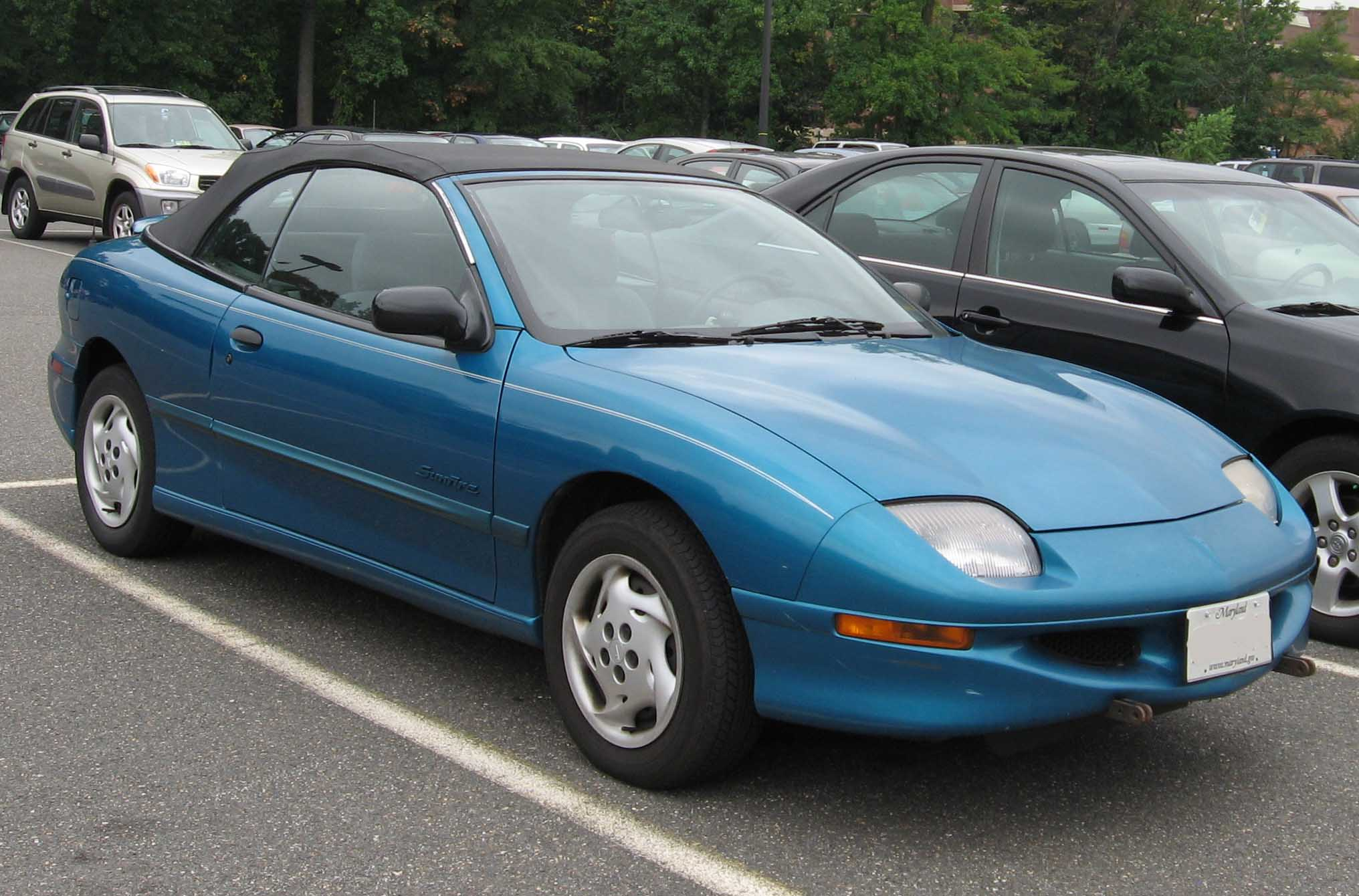
1995–1999 Pontiac Sunfire convertible

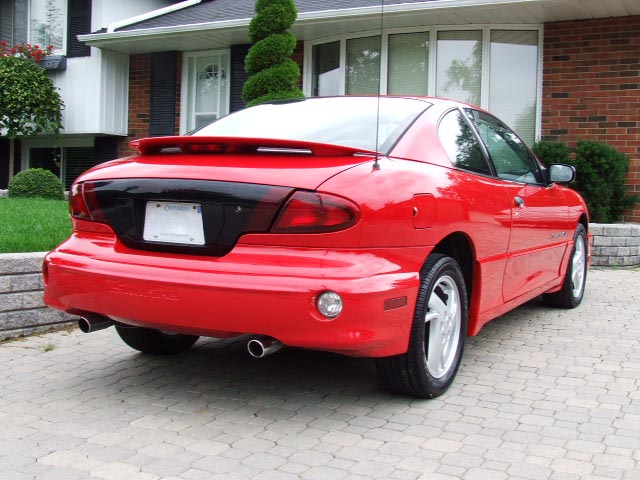
2001 Pontiac Sunfire GT coupe rear

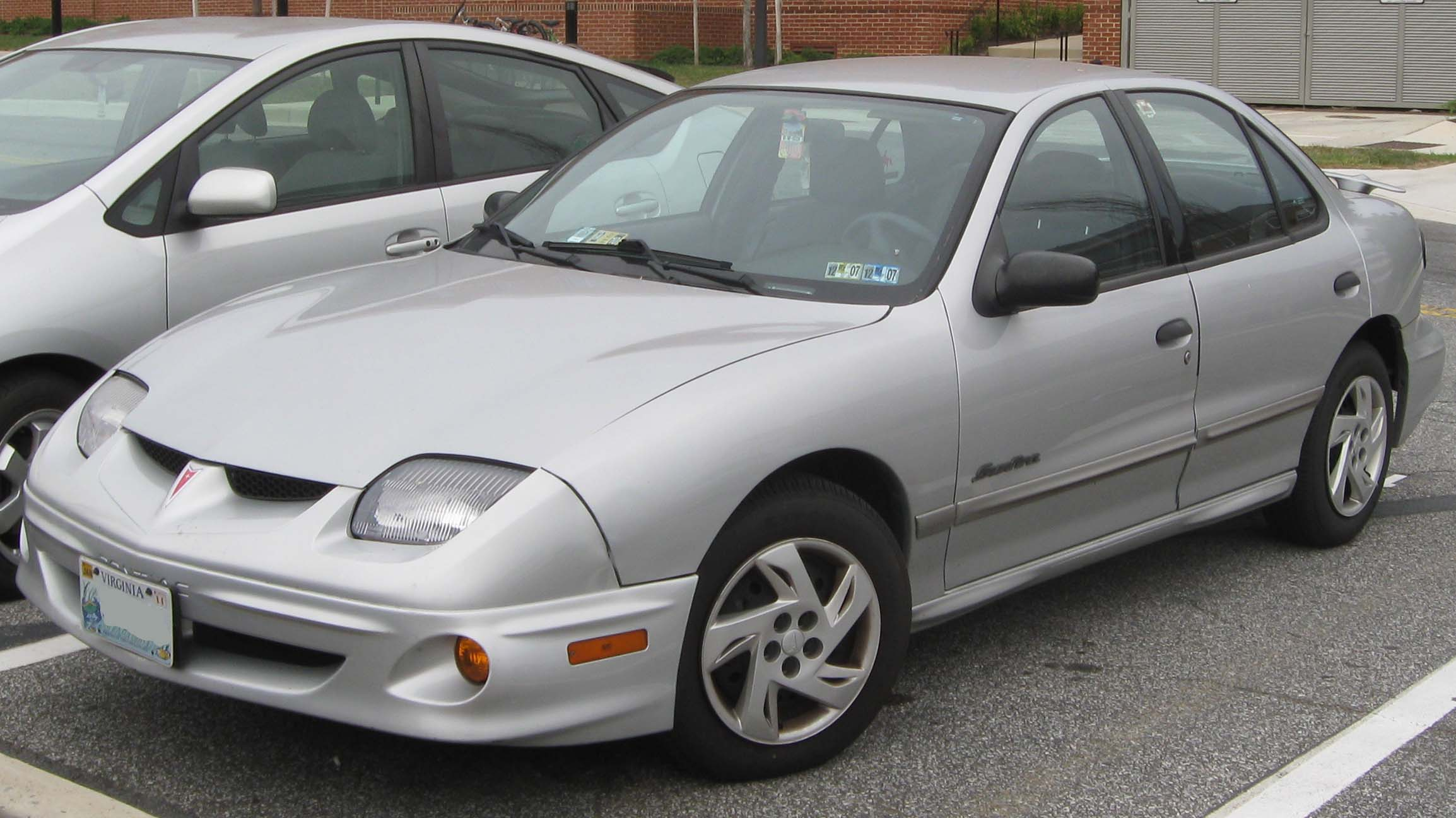
2000–2002 Pontiac Sunfire sedan

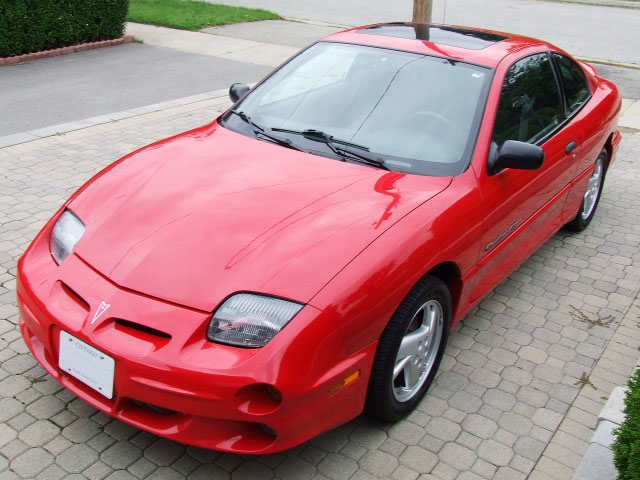
2000–2002 Pontiac Sunfire coupe

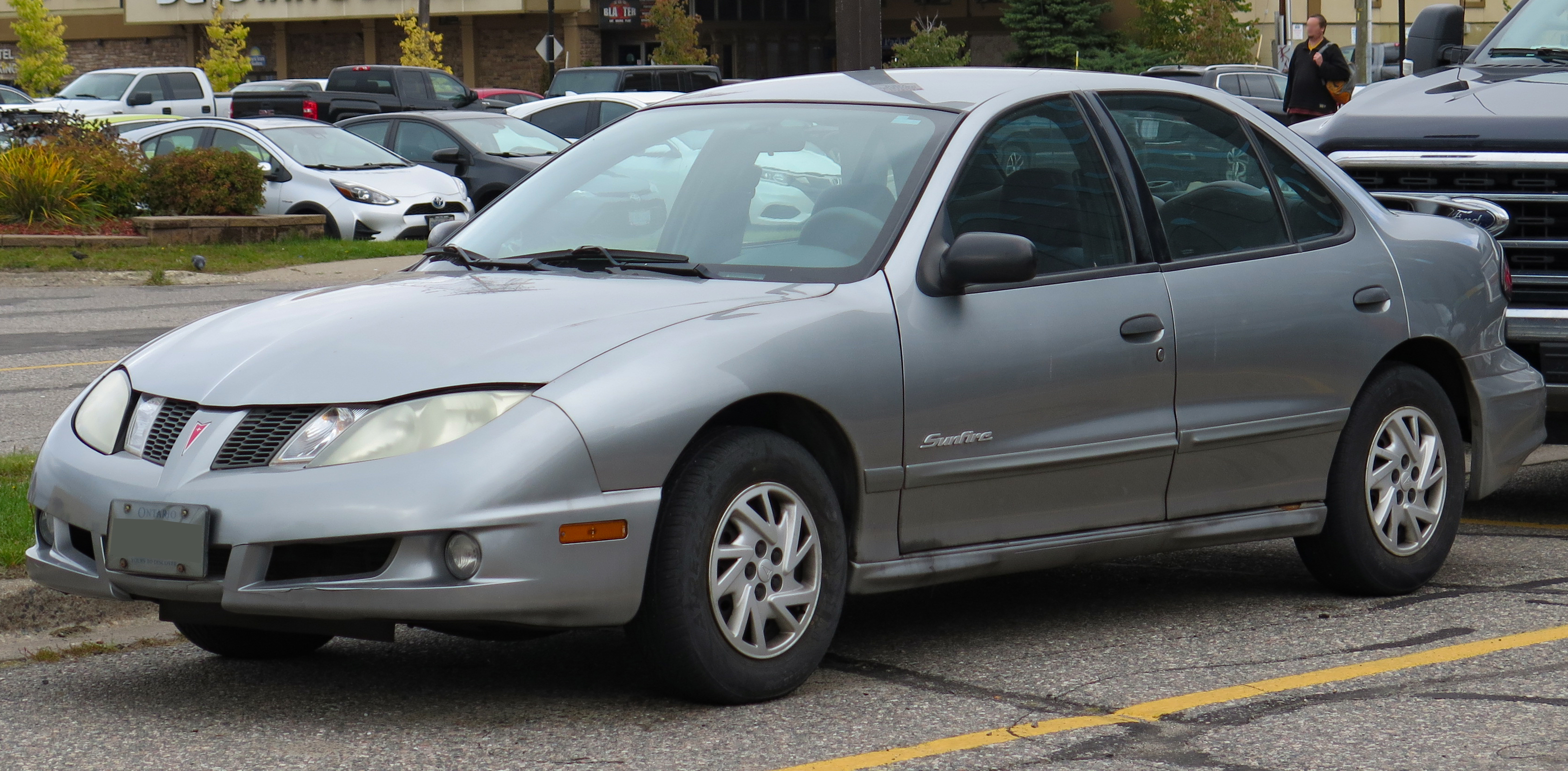
2003–2005 Pontiac Sunfire SL sedan

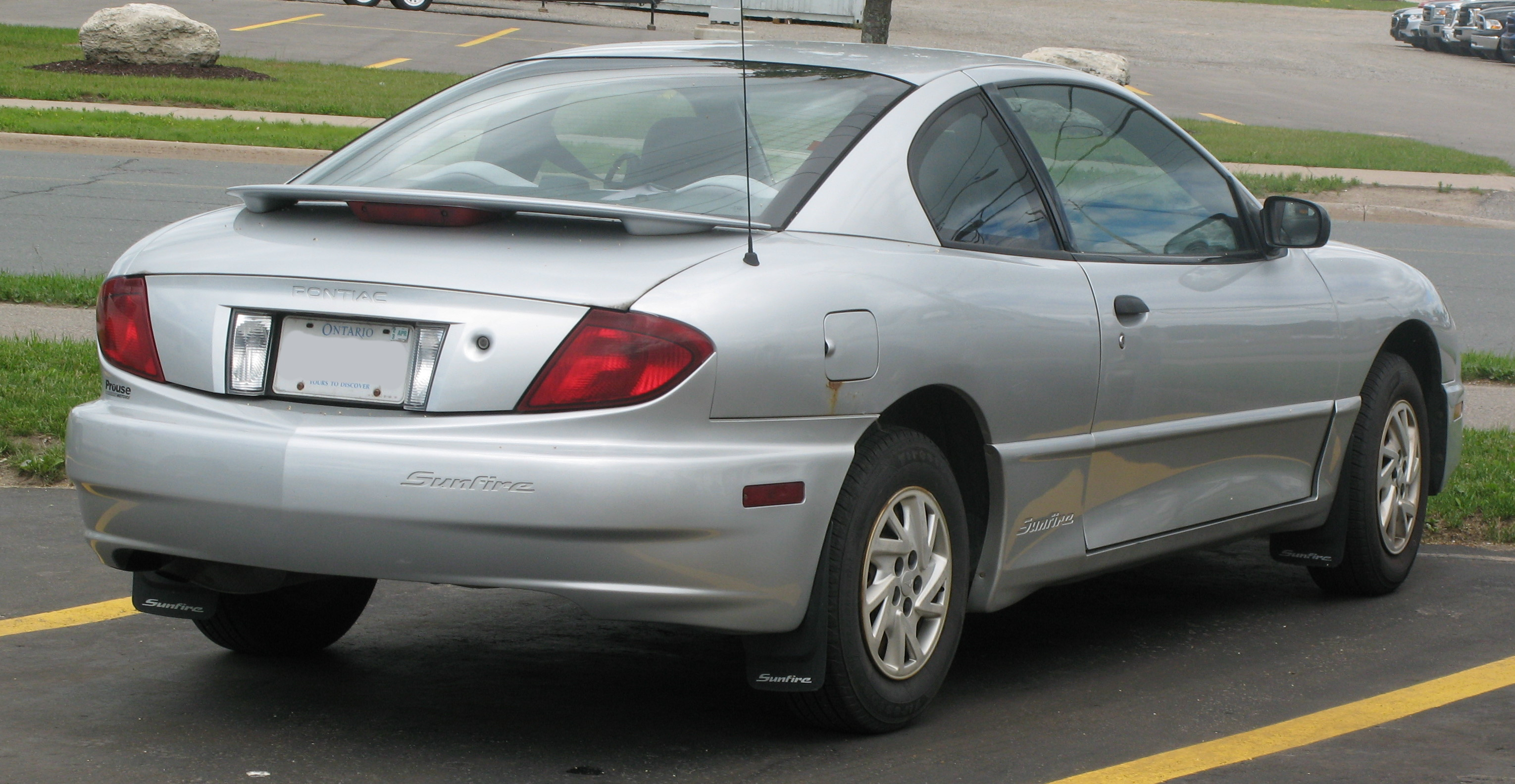
2003–2005 Pontiac Sunfire coupe
