= Oldsmobile Achieva =

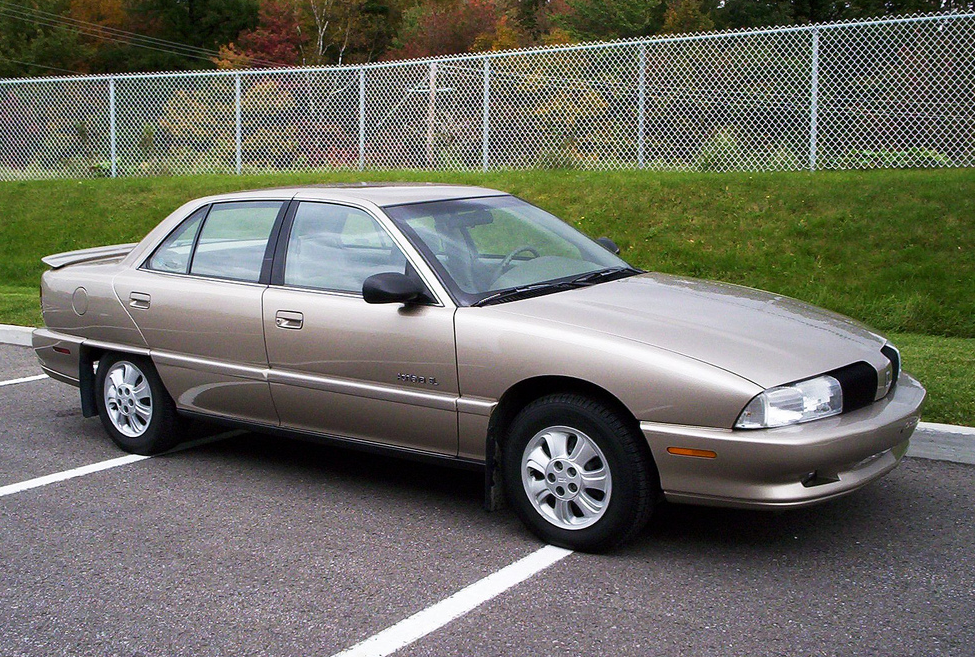

Overview
- Manufacturer: Oldsmobile (General Motors)
- Production: 1991–1997
- Model years: 1992–1998
- Assembly: United States: Lansing, Michigan (Lansing Car Assembly)
- Designer: Gary Smith

Body and chassis
- Class: Compact car
- Body style: 2-door coupe 4-door sedan
- Layout: Transverse front-engine, front-wheel drive
- Platform: GM N platform
- Related: Buick Skylark; Pontiac Grand Am; Chevrolet Corsica; Chevrolet Beretta

Powertrain
- Engine: 2.3 L L40 I4; 2.3 L LD2/LG0 DOHC I4; 2.4 L LD9 DOHC I4; 3.1 L L82 V6; 3.3 L LG7 V6
- Transmission: 3-speed 3T40 automatic 4-speed 4T60-E automatic 5-speed Getrag 282 manual

Dimensions
- Wheelbase: 103.4 in (2,626 mm)
- Length: 1992–95: 187.9 in (4,773 mm); 1996–98: 187.8 in (4,770 mm)
- Width: 1992–93: 67.5 in (1,714 mm); 1994–98: 68.6 in (1,742 mm); 1996–98 Sedan: 68.1 in (1,730 mm)
- Height: 1992–93: 53.2 in (1,351 mm); 1994–98: 53.5 in (1,359 mm)

Chronology
- Predecessor: Oldsmobile Cutlass Calais
- Successor: Oldsmobile Alero

The Oldsmobile Achieva is a front-wheel drive compact sedan and coupe that was introduced by Oldsmobile for the 1992 model year. The Achieva was based on the GM N-body platform, which it also shared with its siblings the Pontiac Grand Am and Buick Skylark. The Achieva replaced the GM N-body Cutlass Calais after its final 1991 model year, and ended production after the 1998 model year.

== Overview ==
The Achieva is a compact car produced by the General Motors' Oldsmobile division from 1991 until 1998 and was available as a sedan or coupe. The car was designed alongside the related Pontiac Grand Am and Buick Skylark; to save money, Oldsmobile did not get to design their own greenhouse. Instead, the Achieva coupe used the Grand Am's upper portion, while the sedan used that of the Skylark.

It was offered in four different trim levels during its production run: S, SC, SL, and SCX. Available engines included different versions of the Oldsmobile-developed 2.3 L Quad 4 engine: the base single-cam L40 "Quad OHC", the DOHC LD2, the high-output LG0, and the special "W41" variant of the LG0 Quad 4 used in the SCX model. All were replaced for 1996 by a revised 2.4 L version. A pair of V6 engines were also offered including the Buick-sourced 90° 3.3 L "3300" V6, which was later replaced by Chevrolet's 60° 3.1 L "3100" V6. While a 5-speed manual transaxle was initially offered as the standard base transmission, most Achieva models were sold with 3-speed or 4-speed automatic transaxles. 1998 was the final model year for the Achieva, after which it was replaced in the Oldsmobile lineup by the Alero for the 1999 model year.

== Initial production ==
Achieva SC coupe

The Achieva was first seen as a concept car at the 1991 Chicago Auto Show, positioned to replace Oldsmobile's compact Calais models. The Calais and Achieva share the same front wheel drive N-body architecture including identical wheelbase. The Achieva started regular production for the 1992 model year. It was offered in four different trim levels: S and SL, available on both coupes and sedans, and the sporty SC and SCX coupes. The base S offered a 120 hp (89 kW) 2.3 L "Quad OHC" 4-cylinder, while the SL had the DOHC 160 hp (119 kW) Quad 4 engine standard that was optional on the S model. A 160 hp (119 kW) 3.3 L V6 engine was optional for the SL. The SC coupe had a standard 180 hp (134 kW) high-output Quad 4 with 5-speed manual transmission or a 3-speed automatic, with the 3.3 L V6 being an option.

== SCX ==
The W41 coupe was introduced by Oldsmobile in 1991 on the Cutlass Calais and offered through 1993 on the Achieva. The Achieva SCX replaced the previous Cutlass Calais 442 W41 as the best handling, highest power output compact car in the Oldsmobile's lineup as well as being the last performance "W-Machine" Oldsmobile would offer. The SCX is a higher-performance version of the SC (sports coupe) and as such utilized the SC's deeper front bumper cover with standard fog lamps, lower body side cladding, rear bumper cover with dual exhaust tip cut-outs, as well as a unique W41-specific silver colored stripe around the lower body moldings, "W41" decals on the front fenders, and "Achieva SCX" decals at the leading edges of the doors. Other appearance changes for the SCX W41 package included the addition of a 140 mph speedometer in place of the standard 120 mph unit as well as a tachometer indicating the higher 7200 rpm red line.

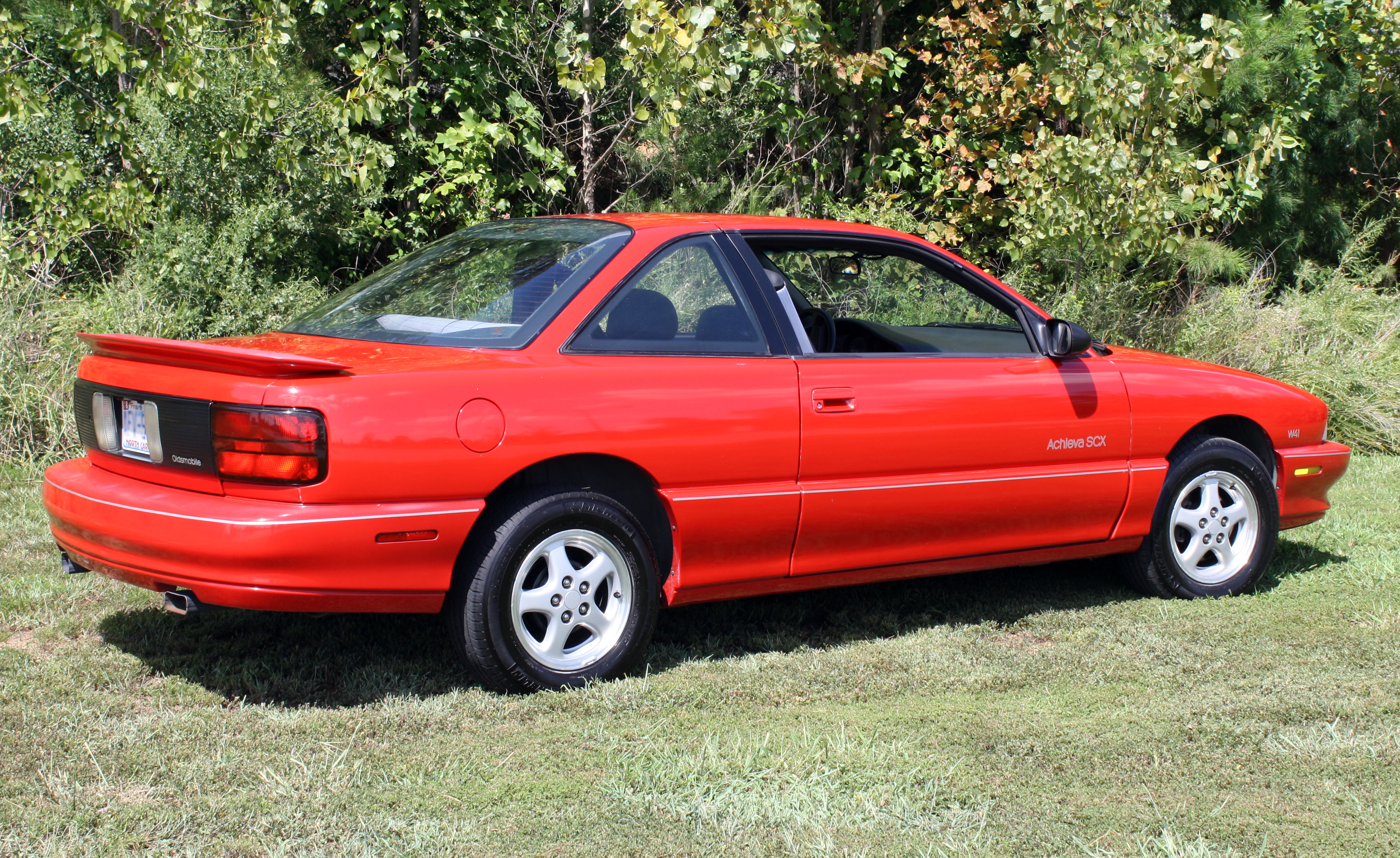
1992 Oldsmobile Achieva SCX coupe

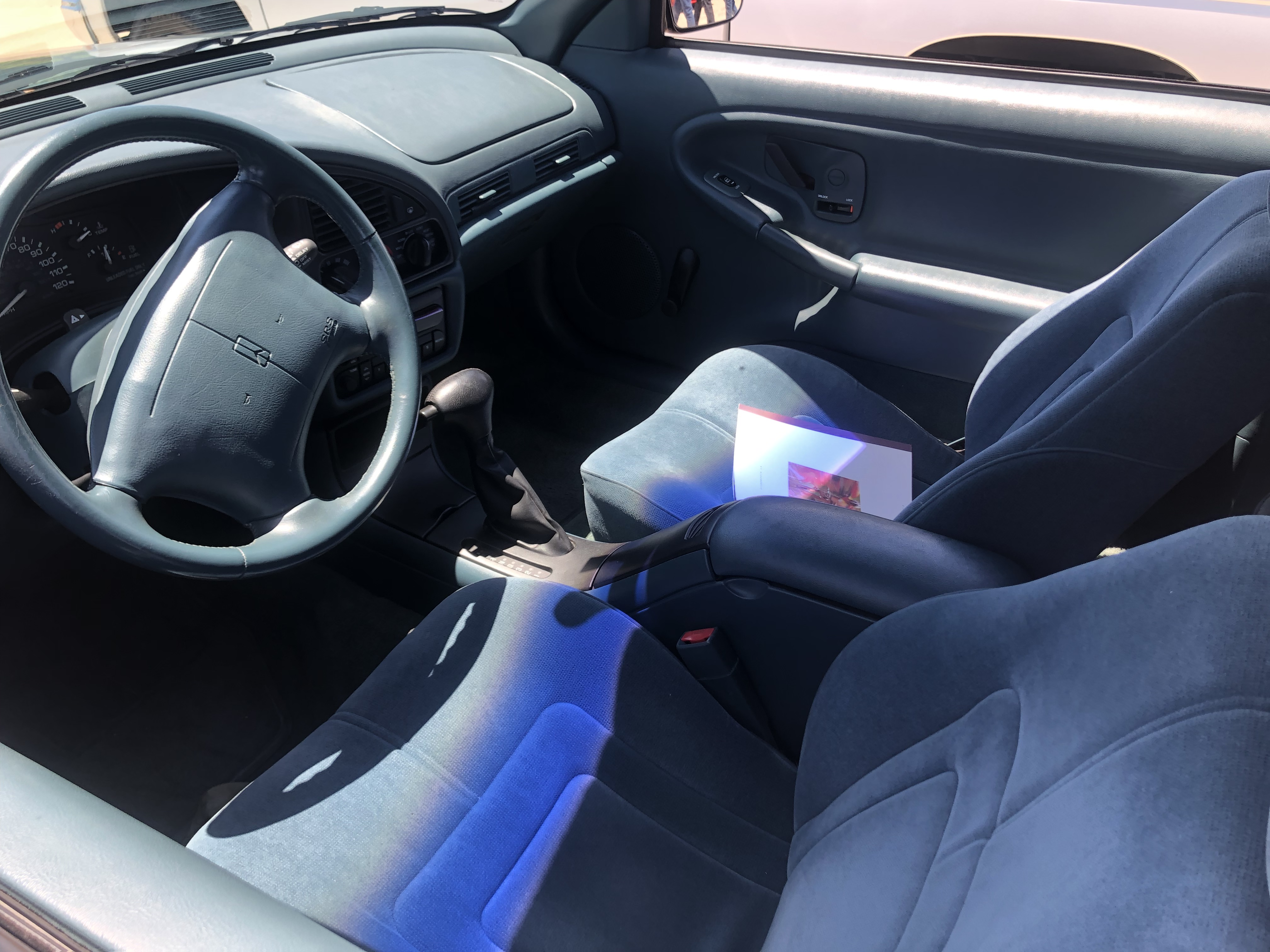
1996-1997 Achieva SC coupe interior

Performance modifications primarily differentiated the SCX from the SC models and were designed to make the SCX competitive for use in showroom stock racing series such as the IMSA Firehawk and SCCA GRAND-AM World Challenge. This included the move to smaller diameter yet wider V-rated P215/60VR14 BF Goodrich Comp T/A tires on 14x6.5 inch cast aluminum wheels (compared to the SC's 205/55R16 on 16x6 inch wheels) and different suspension components on the SCX-specific FX3 RPO coded suspension. The suspension changes included larger diameter direct-acting front sway bar over the base Achieva, a wider rear axle with dual rear sway bars, "Computer Command Ride" (CCR) electronically adjustable struts and shock absorbers, as well as higher spring rates and bushing changes. (A similar CCR electronic suspension was also offered as an option on the Achieva SC as well as the platform-mate Buick Skylark and works similar to the systems offered on Cadillac and Corvette models of the time.)

The SCX's powertrain included the highest output naturally aspirated four-cylinder engine GM had produced up to that time: the 190 hp (142 kW), 160 lb⋅ft (217 N⋅m) W41 version of Oldsmobile's Quad 4 engine. Compared to the SC's standard high-output, 180 hp (134 kW) LGO Quad 4, the W41 version of the LGO Quad 4 was fitted with different camshafts, a low restriction exhaust system with dual mufflers and a special engine computer calibration for the ignition and fuel systems that also raised the engine's redline to 7200 rpm. This engine was complemented by a unique version of the Getrag-licensed, GM-Muncie built Getrag 282 five-speed transmission with special second and fifth gears as well as a different final drive ratio for quicker acceleration and better gearing to keep the engine in its power band.

Fewer than 1,650 SCX were built. The production numbers for the Achieva SCX in 1992 totaled 1146 cars made with (6) C41 RPO code A/C-delete racing models as follows: (1) bright red, (2) medium garnet red, (1) aqua, (1) blue, and (1) white cars. The normal C60 RPO code models included (472) bright red, (42) medium garnet red, (218) black, (196) aqua, (50) neon blue, (151) white, and (11) gray cars. Of them, only 15 examples received the lightweight, track-oriented C41 package, with handcranked windows, no air conditioner, and a Torsen differential.

The 1993 SCX production totaled 500 cars produced including (5) C41 RPO code A/C-delete racing models as follows: (1) bright red, (1) aqua, and (3) white cars. The normal C60 RPO code models included (128) black, (191) bright red, (20) medium garnet red, (73) aqua, (8) neon blue, (70) white, and (5) majestic pearl cars.

== Production changes ==
1993: For its second model year, engines offered a 5 horsepower (3.7 kW) reduction in power to comply with emission requirements, lowering the output of each engine. The SCX offered 185 horsepower (138 kW) for its final year, primarily due to exhaust port changes to the cylinder head. Other changes included a revised front engine mount and changes to the Quad 4 block casting to improve NVH characteristics - although the engine was still considered raucous and went through another power drop for 1995.

1994: A driver-side airbag was added as a standard feature, and the Buick-developed "3300" V6 was replaced by a Chevrolet-designed, 3.1-liter "3100" V6.

1995: 1995 trim levels were reduced to one: SC coupe and SL sedan, divided into two groups, Series I and Series II according to equipment. The detuned Quad 4, now producing 150 hp (112 kW), and the 3.1 liter V6 with 155 hp (116 kW) were the only available engines for 1995; the other two engines from the previous year were dropped.

1996: 1996 models included standard air conditioning and daytime running lamps. The dash was redesigned and shared with the Buick Skylark, featuring revised gauges and a passenger-side airbag. A Series III equipment level was added while the Series I was now only available on the coupe. The new base engine was a 2.4 liter four-cylinder "Twin Cam" that replaced the 2.3 L Quad 4. There were little changes other than reduced trim levels and options for the final two model years.

1997: Trim levels were simplified to Series I and II. The standard included automatic transmission, larger touring tires, power exterior mirrors, driver's side adjustable lumbar support, and standard traction control. 1997 models complied with side-impact standards, and the Series II Coupe received alloy cross-lace alloy wheels.

1998: The final model year for the Achieva was 1998, with the majority of sales going to fleet customers. The Achieva was complemented at the end of its production run by the slightly larger Cutlass which overlapped Achieva production from 1997 to 1999. Both models were replaced in the Oldsmobile lineup by the Alero for 1999. The Cutlass and Alero were built on a redesigned GMX130 N-body platform that shared little chassis and platform architecture with the Achieva.

Achieva production ended on December 4, 1997.

== Trim levels and engines ==
=== Trim levels ===
4-Door Sedan (1992–1998):

- S - 1992–1995
- SL - 1992–1998

2-Door Coupe (1992–1997):

- S - 1992–1995
- SC - 1992–1997
- SCX - 1992–1993

=== Engines ===
- 1992–1994 Quad OHC L40 2.3 L (140 cu in) I4, 115 hp (86 kW) and 140 lb⋅ft (190 N⋅m)
- 1992–1995 Quad-4 LD2 2.3 L (140 cu in) I4, 155-180 hp and 150 lb⋅ft (200 N⋅m)
- 1992–1994 Quad-4 LG0 2.3 L (140 cu in) I4, 175-180 hp and 160 lb⋅ft (220 N⋅m)
- 1992–1993 Quad-4 2.3 L (140 cu in) I4, 185-190 hp and 160 lb·ft (SCX W41)
- 1992–1993 3300 3.3 L (204 cu in) V6, 160 hp (120 kW) and 185 lb⋅ft (251 N⋅m)
- 1994–1998 3100 3.1 L (191 cu in) V6 160 hp (120 kW) and 185 lb⋅ft (251 N⋅m)
- 1996–1998 LD9 2.4 L (146 cu in) "Twin Cam" I4, 150 hp (110 kW) and 150 lb⋅ft (200 N⋅m)

== Motorsport ==
The Achieva won the touring car championship of the SCCA World Challenge from 1992 to 1994. As of 2020, Oldsmobile is the only GM division other than Chevrolet (Sonic) to accomplish this feat and only one of two American brands (along with Chrysler's Eagle Talon, 1989–1991) to accomplish it in the 1990s. The Dodge Shelby Charger won the predecessor SCCA / Escort Endurance Championship in 1986.
