= Oldsmobile Cutlass Calais =

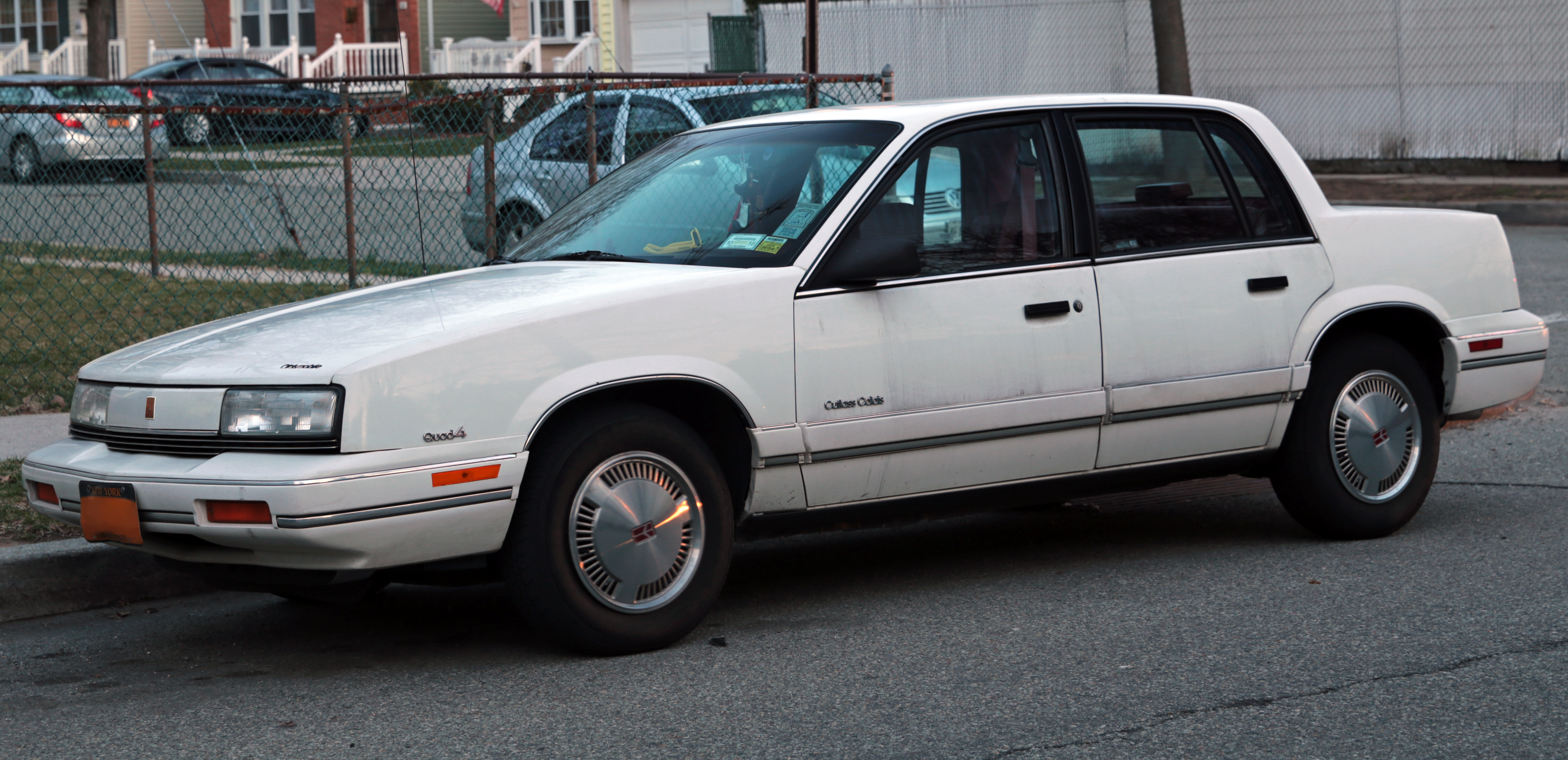

Overview
- Manufacturer: Oldsmobile (General Motors)
- Also called: Oldsmobile Calais (from 1985–1987)
- Production: 1984-1991
- Model years: 1985-1991
- Assembly: United States: Lansing, Michigan (Lansing Car Assembly)

Body and chassis
- Class: Compact
- Body style: 2-door coupe 4-door sedan
- Layout: Transverse front-engine, front-wheel drive
- Platform: N-body
- Related: Buick Somerset; Buick Skylark; Pontiac Grand Am

Powertrain
- Engine: 2.3 L Quad 4 I4; 2.5 L Tech IV I4; 3.0 L Buick V6; 3.3 L 3300 V6
- Transmission: 5-speed manual 3-speed THM125 automatic

Dimensions
- Wheelbase: 103.4 in (2,626 mm)
- Length: 1988: 178.8 in (4,542 mm); 1989–1991: 179.3 in (4,554 mm)
- Width: 1988: 66.7 in (1,694 mm); 1989–1991: 66.9 in (1,699 mm)
- Height: 1988: 52.3 in (1,328 mm); 1989–1991: 52.4 in (1,331 mm)

Chronology
- Predecessor: Oldsmobile Omega; Oldsmobile Firenza
- Successor: Oldsmobile Achieva

The Oldsmobile Calais is a compact car that was manufactured and marketed by Oldsmobile from 1985 through 1991, superseding the Oldsmobile Omega and named after the city of Calais, France. Renamed the Cutlass Calais for 1988, the Calais shared the GM N platform with the Pontiac Grand Am and the Buick Skylark/Buick Somerset—and was superseded by the Oldsmobile Achieva in 1992. Previously, the Cutlass Calais nameplate was used on top-line versions of the Cutlass Supreme coupé (differing from the Supreme only in minor trim details) from 1978 to 1984. There was also a Cadillac Calais model, sold from 1965 to 1976.

== Models ==
The Calais was initially offered in an unnamed base and Supreme models. For 1986, four-door models were added across the lineup, and GT and the ES models were introduced. Distinguishing features of these two sportier models included composite headlamps (replacing quad sealed beam units), FE3 sport tuned suspension and various body cladding. In 1987, the ES was dropped and the lineup consisted of the base, Supreme and GT. Composite headlamps were on all models, and passive restraints were added to all models. The standard powerplant was the Tech-IV four-cylinder, with the 3.0 V6 (automatic only) was optional on all models.

In 1988, the Quad 4 engine became available for all models. It was showcased in a special limited edition of the Calais GT, (sometimes known as the GT Quad 4). Offered across several Oldsmobile models, the Calais was also available in the International Series trim. Available as both a 2-door or a 4-door and featured exclusive options for the range including lower front and rear facias, lower rocker extensions, and quad-tipped sport exhaust. Changes inside include thickly bolstered sport seats which feature driver-side power controls and were available in cloth with leather accents or full leather. The International Series came standard with power locks and windows with driver's side auto-down, a multifunction Driver Information Center in the center console, full gauges, cruise control, and the FE3 sport suspension. Optional equipment on the International series included keyless entry and a Delco CD player.

For 1989, the GT was dropped; however, the Quad 4 engine continued to be available for all models.

In 1990, standard engine for the International was the new Quad 4 H.O. although the normal Quad 4 L.O. and automatic transmission were an option.

== Special Editions ==
=== First Production Model ===
The first production model (VIN 1G3NT27UXFM200001), was a white Calais Supreme two-door with a gray velour interior. Equipped with an automatic transmission and the 92 horsepower, 151 CID pushrod four-cylinder engine (also known as GM's "Iron Duke" Tech-IV), this particular model was outfitted with nearly every available option, including wire wheel covers. While this front-wheel drive car was maintained by the R.E. Olds Transportation Museum in Lansing, Michigan, it was one of more than 700 vehicles that made up the GM Heritage Collection. The Calais Supreme was auctioned in April, 2021, and sold for $8,585.

=== 1985 Indianapolis Pace Car ===
Oldsmobile provided the vehicles for the 1985 Indianapolis 500, including two specially built convertibles (a body style never offered by GM) as actual on-track pace cars. The convertibles, one of which was driven by actor James Garner, were painted candy-apple red with a red and silver interior. At least one of the convertible cars is still in existence and was offered at auction in 2019. In addition to the on-track cars Oldsmobile supplied "Calais 500" coupes with decals and special paint, they were otherwise stock. Records indicate 2,998 "Calais 500" editions were built for both track use and for public sale.

=== Quad 442 ===
Between 1990 and 1991, Oldsmobile offered the Quad-442. The 442 part of the name was a call back to previous high performance Oldsmobile automobiles. In the Calais application, the designation translated to four cylinders, four valves per cylinder and two camshafts. It used a high-output version of the four-cylinder coupled to a Getrag 5-speed manual transmission. This same High Output version was also available in the top-of-the-line Cutlass Calais International Series.

== Engines ==
- 1985–1988 Tech IV 2.5 L (151 cu in) I4, 92-98 hp and 135 lb⋅ft (183 N⋅m)
- 1989–1991 Tech IV 2.5 L (151 cu in) I4, 98–110 hp (73–82 kW) and 135 lb⋅ft (183 N⋅m)
- 1987–1991 Quad 4 2.3 L (140 cu in) I4, 150-160 hp and 160 lb⋅ft (217 N⋅m)
- 1990–1991 Quad 4 2.3 L (140 cu in) I4, 180 hp (134 kW) and 160 lb⋅ft (217 N⋅m) (Oldsmobile 442 model)
- 1991 Quad 4 2.3 L (140 cu in) I4, 190 hp (142 kW) and 160 lb⋅ft (217 N⋅m) (Oldsmobile 442 W41 model)
- 1991–1992 Quad OHC 2.3 L (140 cu in) I4, 120 hp (89 kW) and 140 lb⋅ft (190 N⋅m)
- 1985–1988 Buick 3.0 L (181 cu in) V6, 125 hp (93 kW) and 150 lb-ft (203 N-m)
- 1989–1991 3300 3.3 L (204 cu in) V6, 160 hp (119 kW) and 185 lb⋅ft (251 N⋅m)
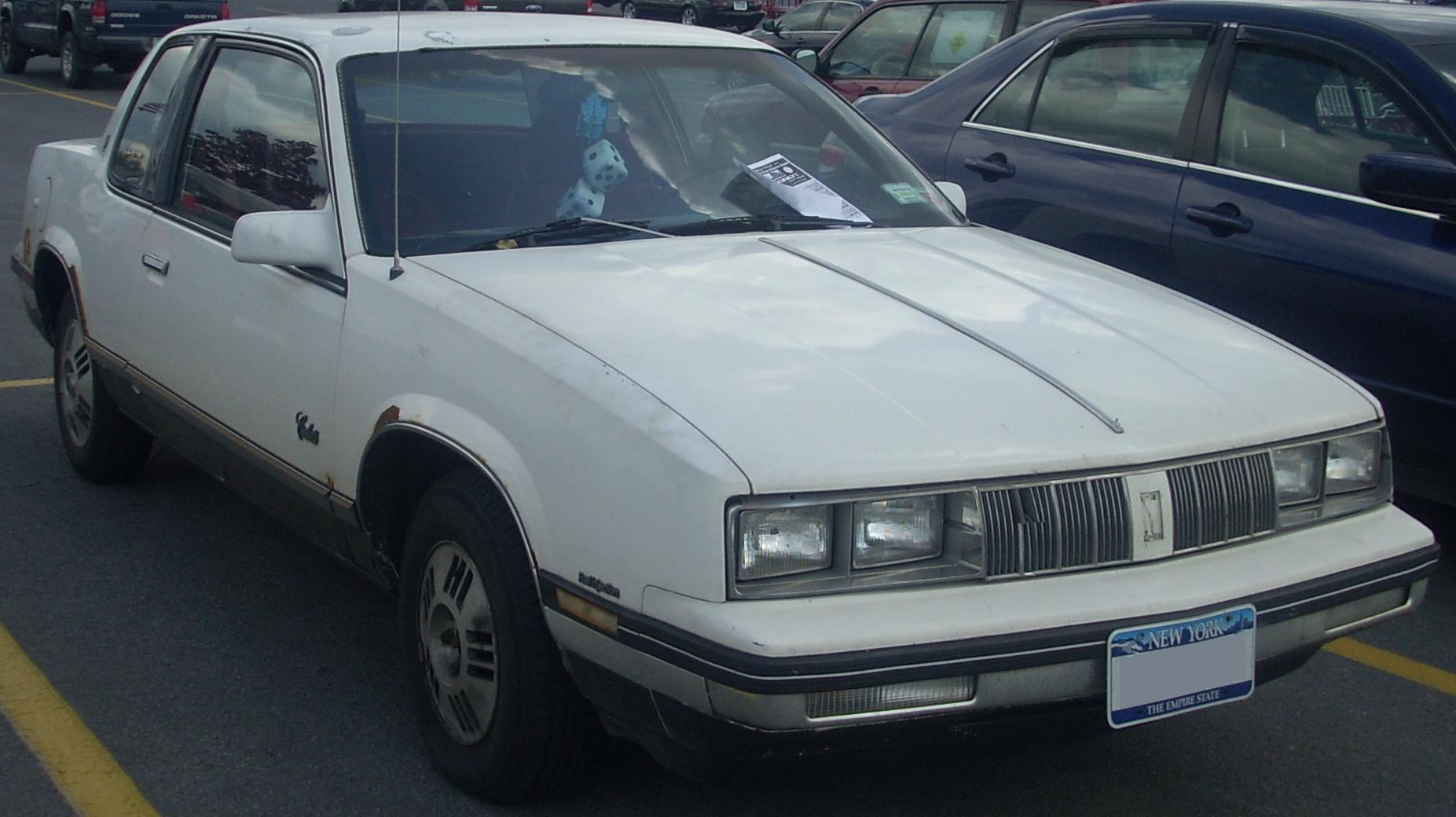
1985–1986 Calais coupe

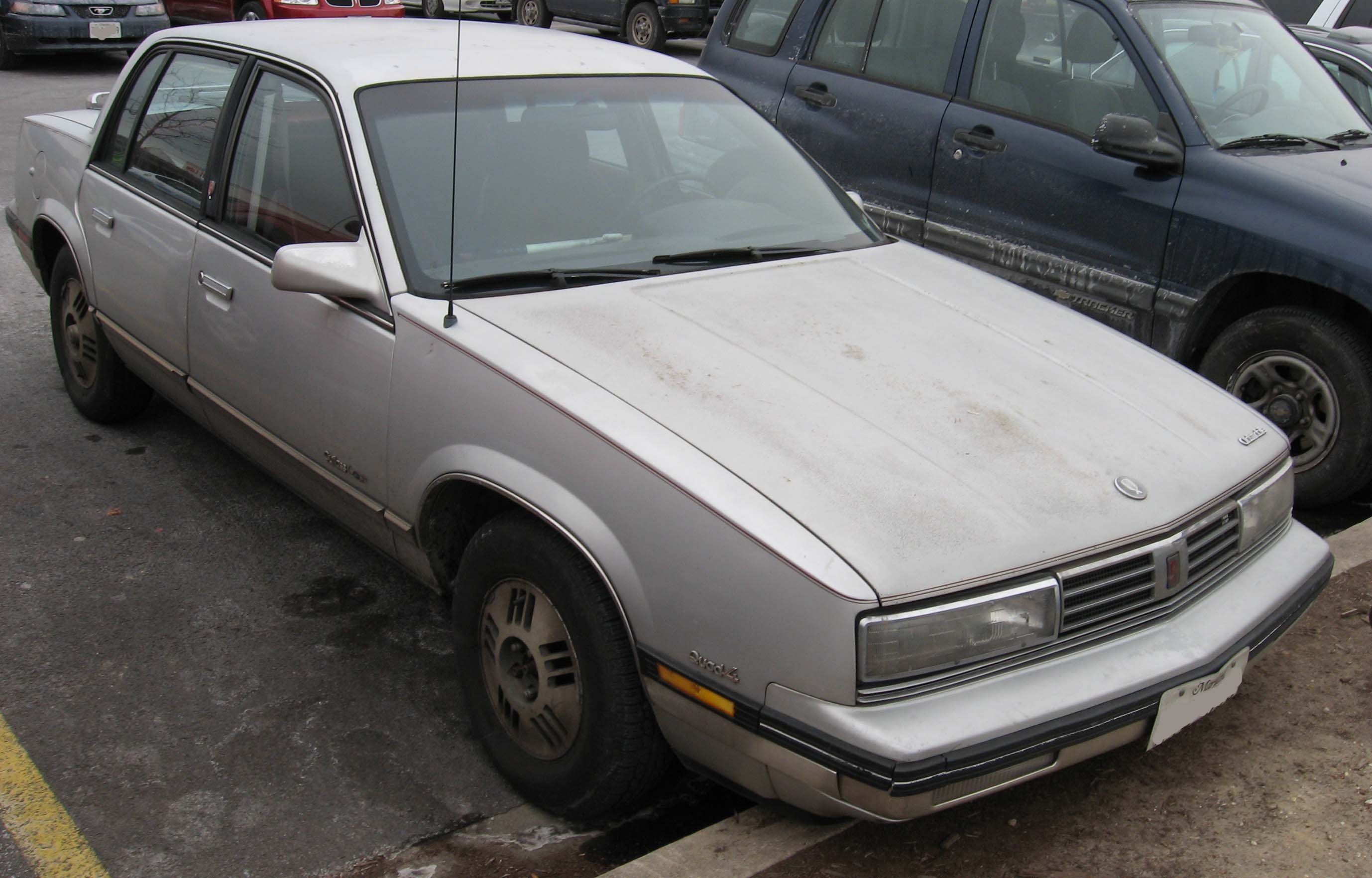
1988 Cutlass Calais sedan

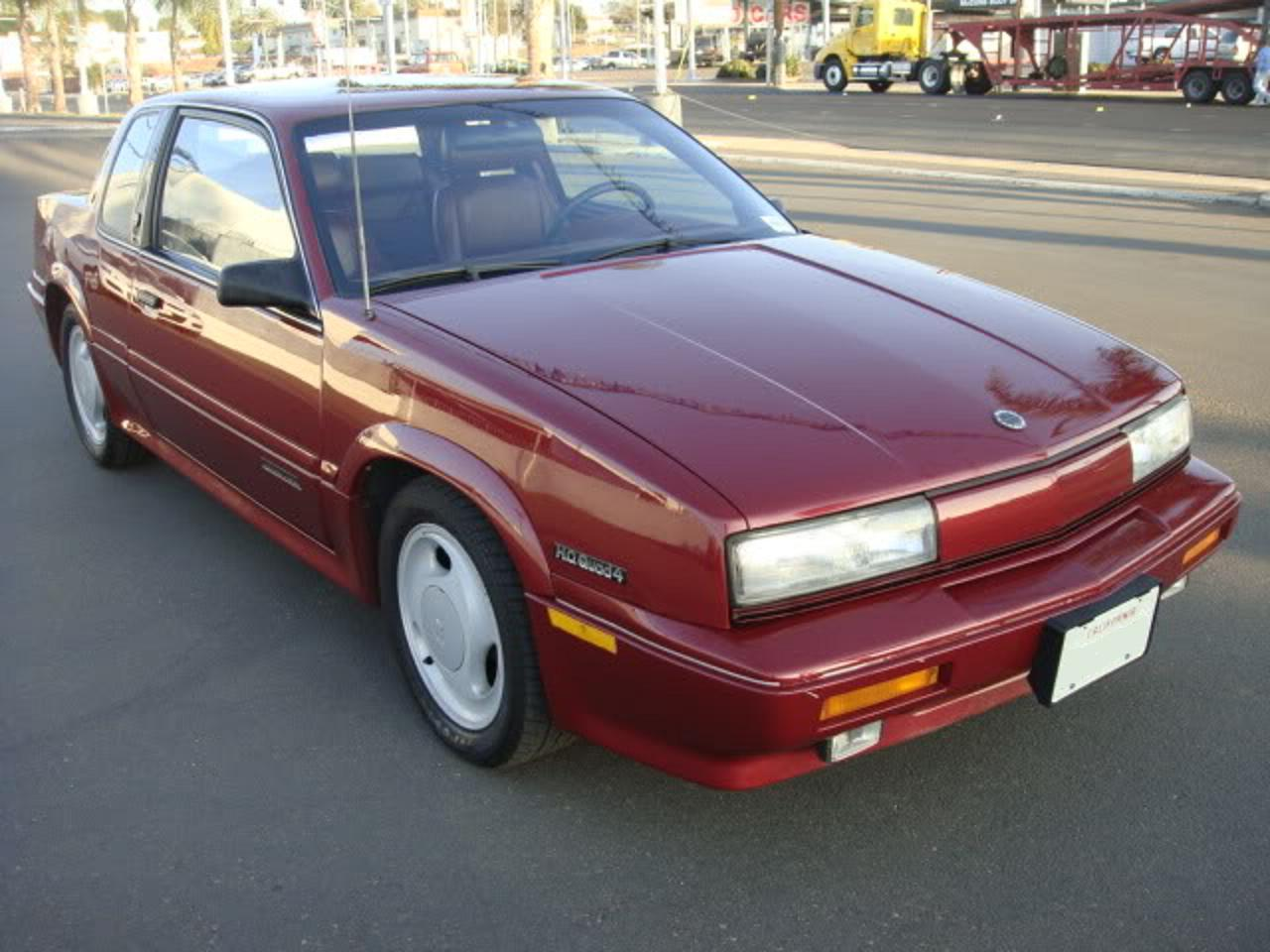
1991 Cutlass Calais International Series coupe

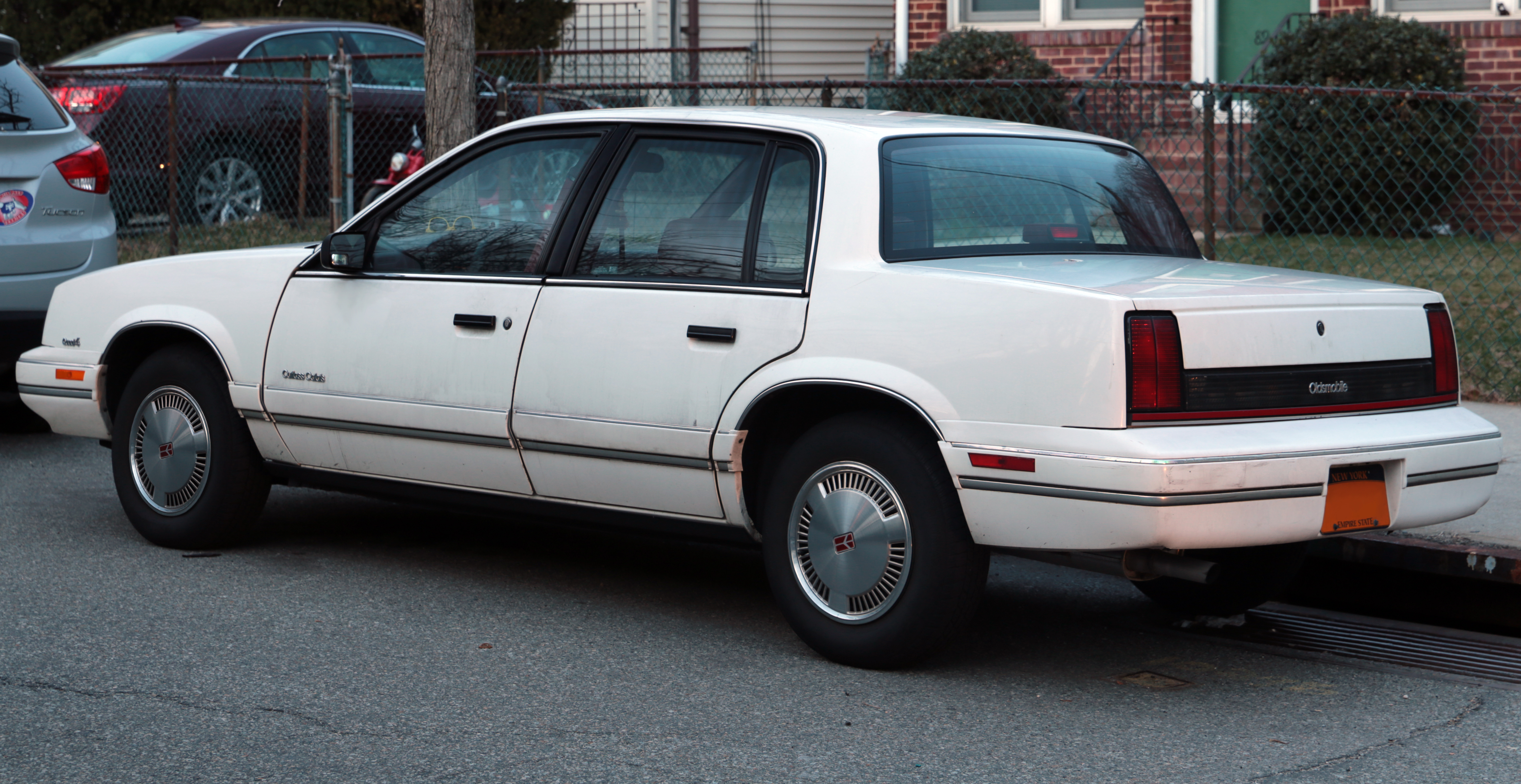
1991 Cutlass Calais sedan, rear

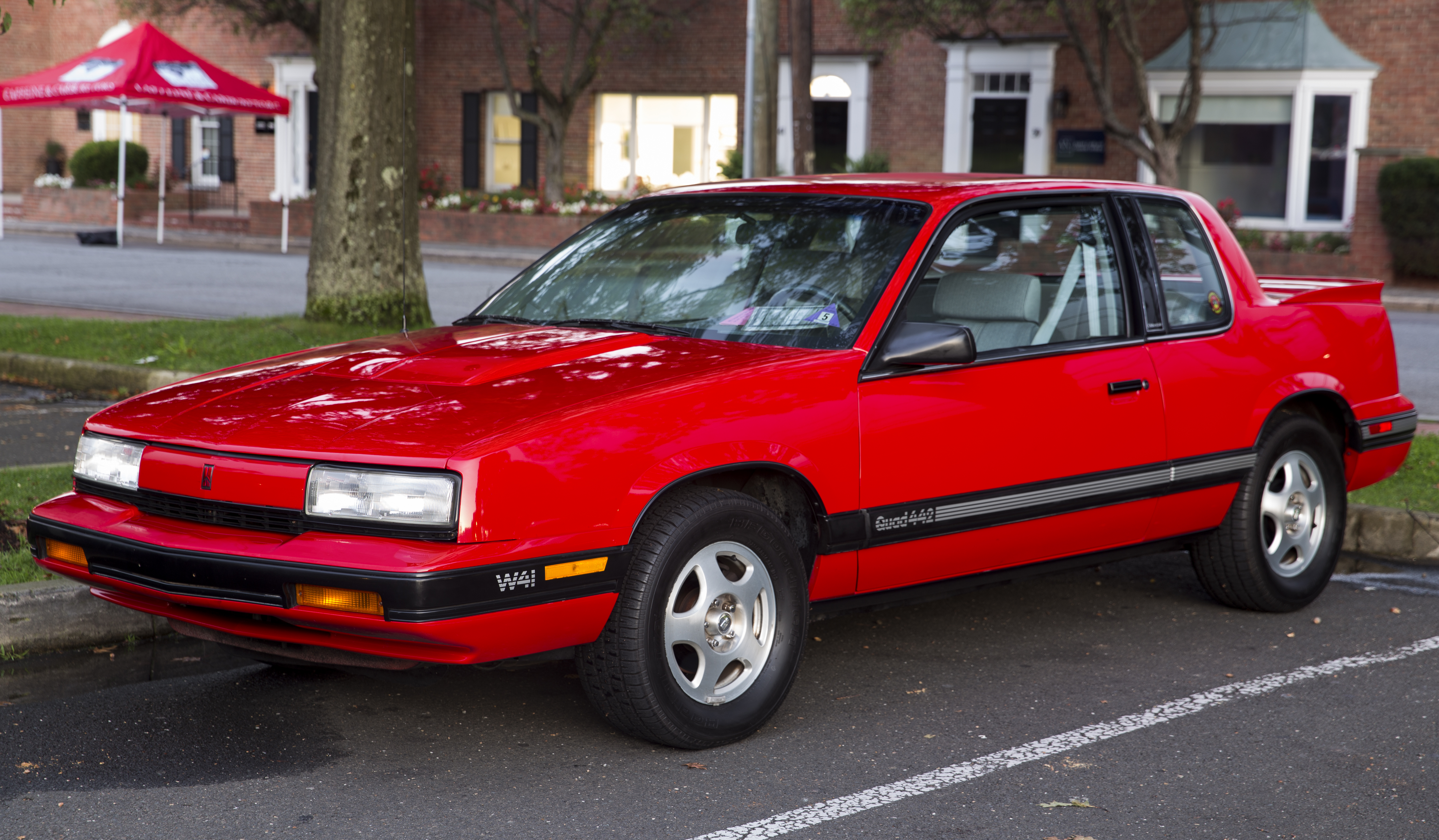
1991 Cutlass Calais Quad 442
