= Speed Dependent Damping Control =

Speed Dependent Damping Control (also called SD²C) was an automatic damper system installed on late-1980s and early-1990s Cadillac automobiles. This system firmed up the suspension at 25 mph (40 km/h) and again at 60 mph (97 km/h). The firmest setting was also used when starting from a standstill until 5 mph (8 km/h).

Applications:

- 1989–1992 Cadillac Allanté

== Computer Command Ride ==
The semi-active suspension system was updated as Computer Command Ride in 1991. This new system included acceleration, braking rates, and lateral acceleration to the existing vehicle speed metric.

- 1991– Cadillac Fleetwood
- 1991– Cadillac Eldorado
- 1991– Cadillac Seville
- 1991– Cadillac De Ville (optional, standard for 1993)
- 1992– Oldsmobile Achieva SCX W41
