= Quad 4 engine =

Inline four-cylinder automobile engine

Oldsmobile Quad 4
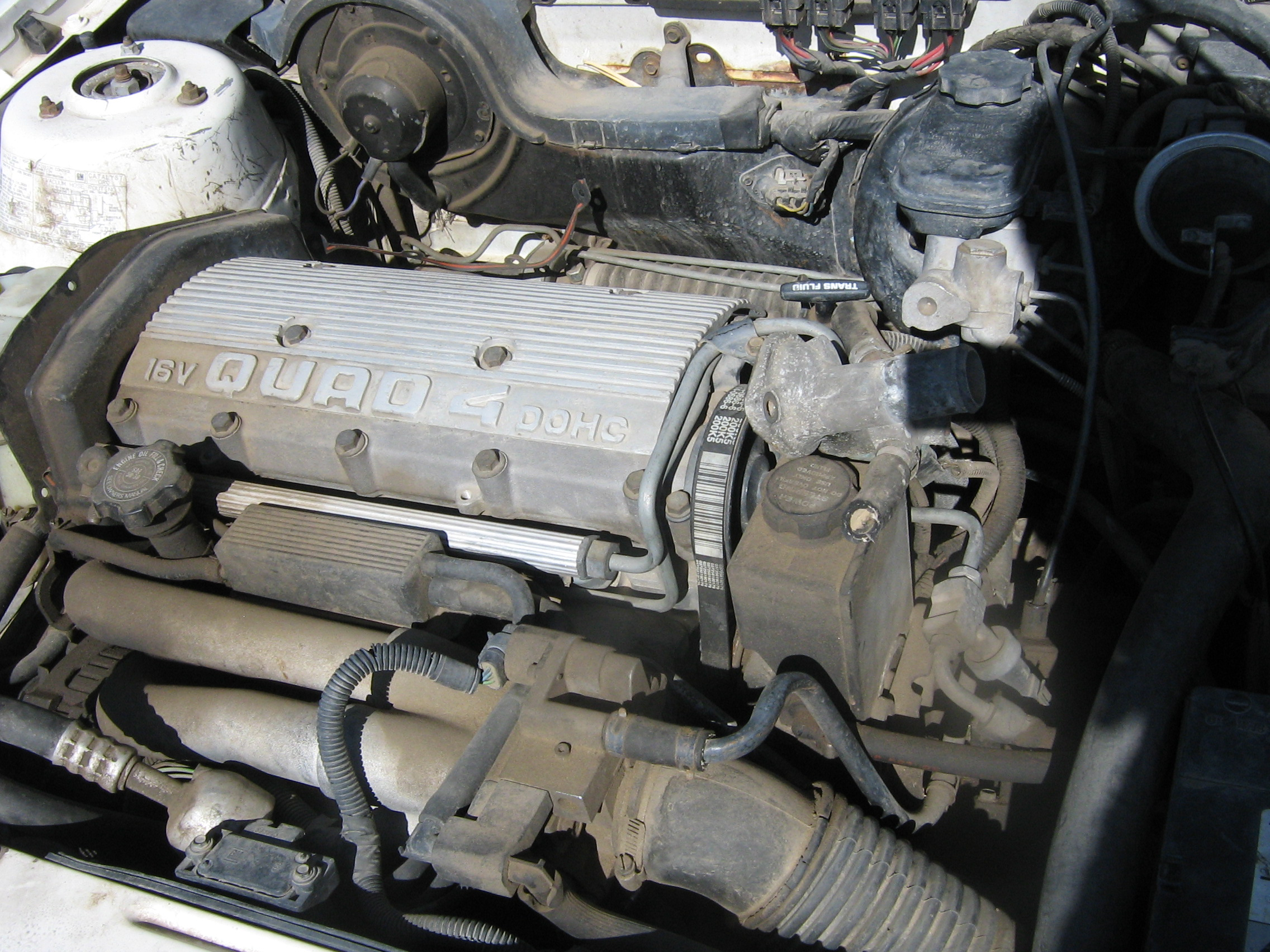

Overview
- Manufacturer: Oldsmobile division of GM
- Also called: Quad OHC; Twin Cam
- Production: 1987–2002

Layout
- Configuration: I4
- Displacement: 2,260 cc (137.9 cu in); 2,392 cc (146.0 cu in)
- Cylinder bore: 92 mm (3.62 in); 90 mm (3.54 in)
- Piston stroke: 85 mm (3.35 in); 94 mm (3.7 in)
- Cylinder block material: Cast iron
- Cylinder head material: Aluminum
- Valvetrain: DOHC 4 valves per cyl.; SOHC, 2 valves per cyl.
- Compression ratio: 9.5:1, 9.7:1, 10.0:1

Combustion
- Turbocharger: Experimental engines only
- Fuel system: Sequential MPFI
- Fuel type: Gasoline
- Oil system: Wet sump
- Cooling system: Water-cooled

Output
- Power output: 150–190 bhp (112–142 kW)
- Torque output: 160 lb⋅ft (217 N⋅m)

Chronology
- Successor: Ecotec engine

The Quad 4 is a family of straight-four engines produced by General Motors' Oldsmobile division. Several double overhead camshaft (DOHC) versions were produced between 1987 and 2002, and one single overhead camshaft (SOHC) model was built from 1992 to 1994.

== History ==
The Quad 4 is the first domestic regular production DOHC four-cylinder engine wholly designed and built by GM, the only similar prior example being the Chevrolet Cosworth Vega, whose DOHC head was designed by Cosworth in England. In addition to the 2.3-liter DOHC Quad 4s, there was also a short-lived 2.3-liter SOHC variant called the "Quad OHC", available from 1992 to 1994, and the 2.4-liter Twin Cam, available from 1996 to 2002.

The Quad 4 was originally expected to debut in 1987, but was delayed for one year. From as early as 1988, Oldsmobile announced that a high-output "HO" Quad 4 with 180 bhp (134 kW) was forthcoming.

All Quad 4 family engines were produced at the Lansing Engine Plant (plant five) in Delta Township near Lansing, Michigan. The Twin Cam was the last engine that was engineered and produced solely by Oldsmobile; the Aurora V8 and Shortstar V6 were based on the Cadillac Northstar V8 architecture.

First released to the public as a regular production option for the 1988 Oldsmobile Cutlass Calais and Pontiac Grand Am, the engine's availability expanded to Buick in late 1988 and Chevrolet in 1990, after which it became a mainstay in GM's lineup.

The Quad 4 underwent two rounds of exhaust port size reductions, followed by the addition of balance shafts in 1995 to address its levels of noise, vibration, and harshness (NVH). Further changes were made for the 1996 model year when the engine's bore and stroke were changed, and the engine was subsequently renamed the "Twin Cam".

The Quad 4 engine lineup was cancelled after the 2002 model year. It was replaced by the Ecotec for the 2003 model year.

== Common features ==
The Quad 4 name is derived from the engine's four-cylinder, four valve-per-cylinder layout. The engine has a cast iron block. The head, camshaft carriers, and timing chain cover are aluminum, and the sump is die-cast aluminum.

Although cogged timing belts were becoming popular among contemporary overhead cam designs, the Quad 4 uses timing chains to drive both camshafts, as well as the water pump. Engine accessories are driven by a single-plane serpentine belt.

Fuel is delivered by an electronic fuel injection system, and spark is produced by a distributorless ignition system called "direct-fire", that alternately fires two ignition coils located under the cast aluminum engine cover.

== Reception ==
Following the engine's release in 1988, Oldsmobile promoted the Quad 4 name with cars like the Oldsmobile Aerotech. Although the engines in the Oldsmobile Aerotechs were purpose-built and turbocharged, they were meant to showcase the design's capability. At the 1988 Indianapolis 500, the pace car was an Oldsmobile Cutlass Supreme convertible powered by a turbocharged production Quad 4.

After positive reviews for the first few years of sales, the automotive press began to criticize the Quad 4 for its NVH levels when compared to competitors.

The design gained a minor following in hot rodding circles due to its resemblance to a 1930s Offenhauser engine once the ribbed aluminum cover was removed, exposing the tall cam towers and deep valley between them holding the spark plugs.

== Versions ==
=== LD2 ===
A 2.3-liter Quad 4 in 1989 Cutlass Calais

The LD2 is the original version of the Quad 4, introduced in 1987 for the 1988 model year. Bore × stroke are 92 mm × 85 mm (3.6 in × 3.3 in), for a displacement of 2,260 cc (137.9 cu in).

In base form it put out 150 bhp (112 kW) from 1988 to 1989 and 160 bhp (119 kW) from 1990 to 1992. The naturally aspirated Quad 4 was able to produce that power with a 9.5:1 compression ratio, and was able to meet emission standards without using an EGR system.

Minor running changes to the base Quad 4 included different crankshafts, cams, and manifolds, all meant to increase torque and reduce NVH.

Applications:

- 1988–1991 Buick Skylark
- 1992–1994 Oldsmobile Achieva
- 1988–1991 Oldsmobile Cutlass Calais
- 1990–1991 Oldsmobile Cutlass Supreme
- 1988–1994 Pontiac Grand Am
- 1990–1991 Pontiac Grand Prix
- 1993–1997 Pontiac Trans Sport (Europe only)

==== 1995 ====
A 2.3-liter Quad 4 in 1995 Chevrolet Cavalier Z24

For 1995 only, a balance shaft-equipped version of the 2.3-liter engine was produced.

This arrangement ensures a constant load on the shafts, the crank drives one shaft, which drives the second, which then drives the oil pump. The shafts spin at twice the engine rpm, forcing the redline to be reduced from 6800 to 6500 rpm.

Output is 150 bhp (112 kW) and 150 lb⋅ft (203 N⋅m). This was the only Quad 4 produced in 1995, and was known as a transitional year for the engine family.

Applications:

- 1995 Pontiac Sunfire GT
- 1995 Chevrolet Cavalier Z24
- 1995 Pontiac Grand Am
- 1995 Oldsmobile Achieva
- 1995 Buick Skylark

=== LG0 ===
The "High Output" 2.3-liter LG0 was rated at 180 hp (134 kW) from 1989 to 1992, 175 hp (130 kW) in 1993 and 170 hp (127 kW) in 1994.(Red line 6800 RPM)

Both the 1993 and 1994 power reductions were a direct result of the first two rounds of exhaust port size reductions for NVH control.

The LG0 is differentiated from the LD2 engine by a tuned intake manifold, aggressive camshafts and an extra half point of compression; 9.5:1 to 10.0:1.

Premium fuel with a 91 octane rating or higher was recommended for these engines due to the compression ratio.

Camshaft specs, 410"/.410" lift and a duration of 212/212 degrees at .050" intake and exhaust.

The H.O and W41 Quad 4 were only available when paired with the heavy-duty Getrag-designed HM-282/NVG-T550 five-speed manual transmission.

1988–1992½ LG0 transmissions all used a 3.61:1 FDR; the 3.94:1 FDR was used on all 1992½–1994 LG0 transmissions, but retained the standard HM-282/NVG-T550 gear set.

The LG0 was introduced with special production runs of 200 Cutlass Calais International Series coupes, and 200 Grand Am SE coupes, all featuring bright red paint and gray interiors.

A limited production version of the LG0 engine was offered in select Oldsmobiles with the designation "W41" (listed below).

LG0 applications:

- 1990–1993 Chevrolet Beretta GTZ
- 1994 Chevrolet Beretta Z26
- 1989–1991 Pontiac Grand Am SE
- 1990–1991 Pontiac Grand Am LE with the "sport performance package" (RPO: W32)
- 1992–1994 Pontiac Grand Am GT
- 1989–1991 Oldsmobile Cutlass Calais International Series
- 1990–1991 Oldsmobile Cutlass Calais Quad 442
- 1992–1994 Oldsmobile Achieva SC
- 1990 Oldsmobile Cutlass Supreme International Series

==== W41 ====
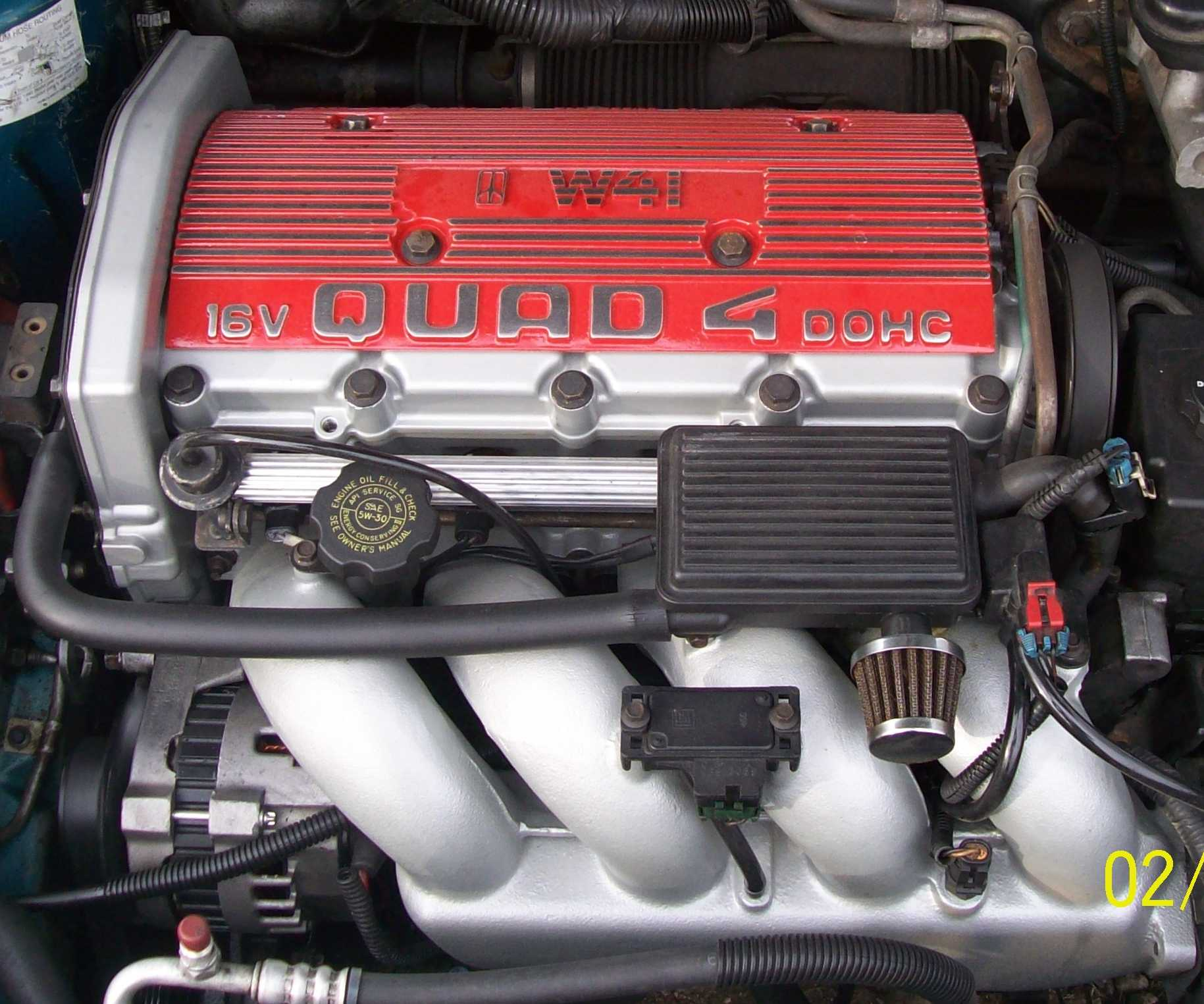
A 2.3-liter Quad 4 W41 engine

The W41 was the most powerful Quad 4.

The 1991–1992 W41s were rated at 190 hp (142 kW) @ 6,800 rpm (7400 RPM redline) and 160 lb-ft of torque @ 5,200 rpm.

1993 W41 was rated at 185 hp (138 kW) (7200 RPM redline) as a result of the first round of exhaust port size reduction to improve emissions and other changes to the Quad 4 architecture to reduce NVH.

The additional 10 hp (7 kW) came from longer duration cams and a different PROM.

Stock 2.3 W41 cams Specs 218 degrees @ .050" with .410" lift for the intake 218 degrees @ .050" with .410" lift for the exhaust

Part of the W41 drivetrain was a specific version of the HM-282/NVG-T550 with a gear set otherwise unavailable. All W41 five-speed transmissions had a final drive ratio (FDR) of 3.94:1 whereas the 1988–1992½ LD2 and LG0 transmissions all used a 3.61:1 FDR; the 3.94:1 FDR was used on all 1992½–1994 LG0 transmissions, but retained the standard HM-282/NVG-T550 gear set.

W41 applications:

- 1990-1991 Oldsmobile Cutlass Calais 442
- 1992–1993 Oldsmobile Achieva SCX

=== L40 ===
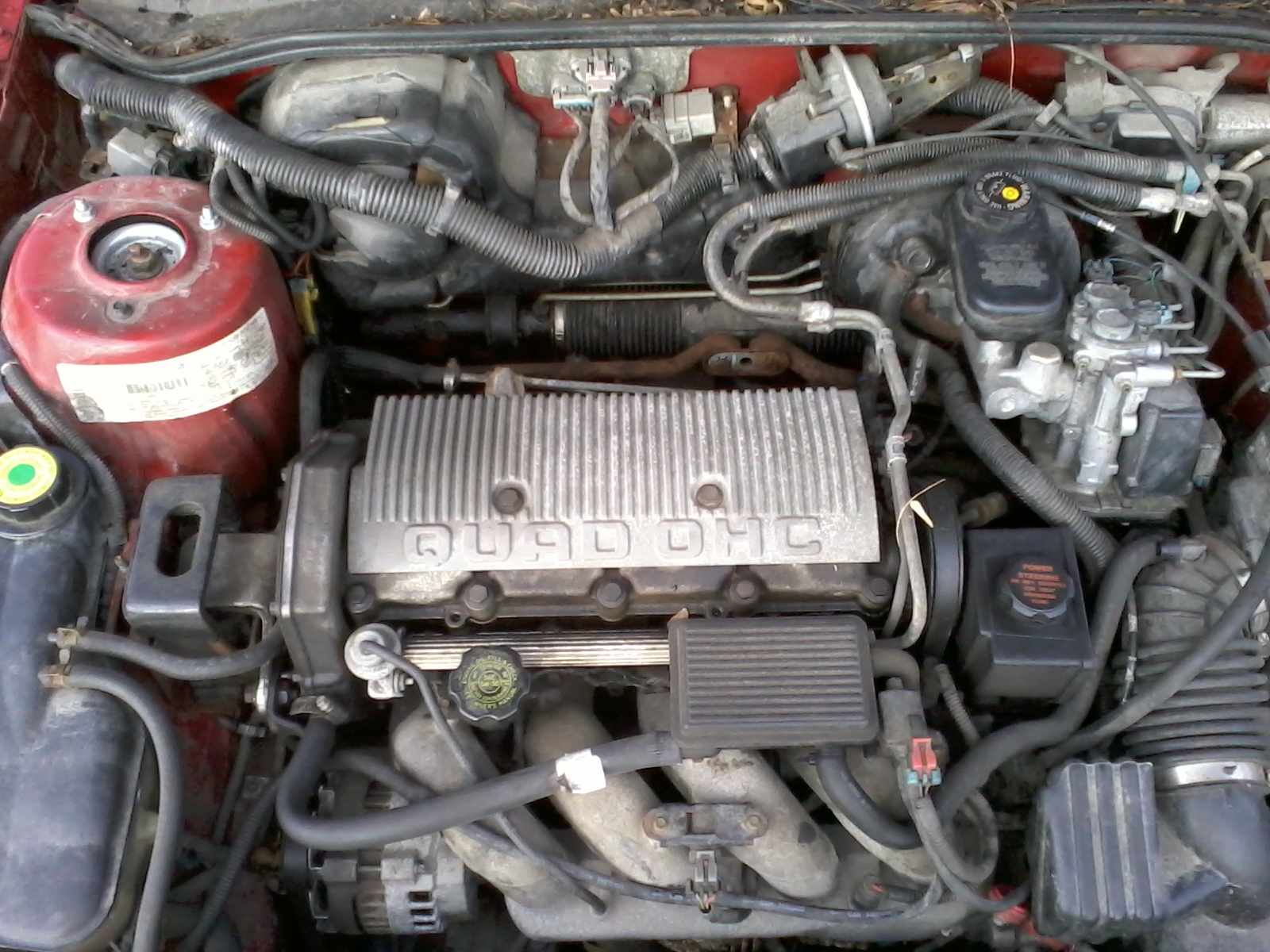
Quad OHC engine

This SOHC variant of the Quad 4 was intended to replace the Pontiac 2.5 L Tech IV OHV "Iron Duke" engine. Debuting in 1992 and called the Quad OHC, this eight-valve engine produced 120 hp (89 kW), 40 hp (30 kW) less than the Quad 4s of the same era. Torque was 140 lb⋅ft (190 N⋅m). Power dropped to 115 hp (86 kW) in 1993 with an attempt by GM to reduce the NVH of the engine.

Although power and fuel economy were better than the Tech IV, the Quad OHC was retired after 1994 when the DOHC version became standard.

Applications:

- 1992–1994 Oldsmobile Achieva
- 1992–1994 Pontiac Grand Am
- 1992–1994 Buick Skylark

=== LD9 ===
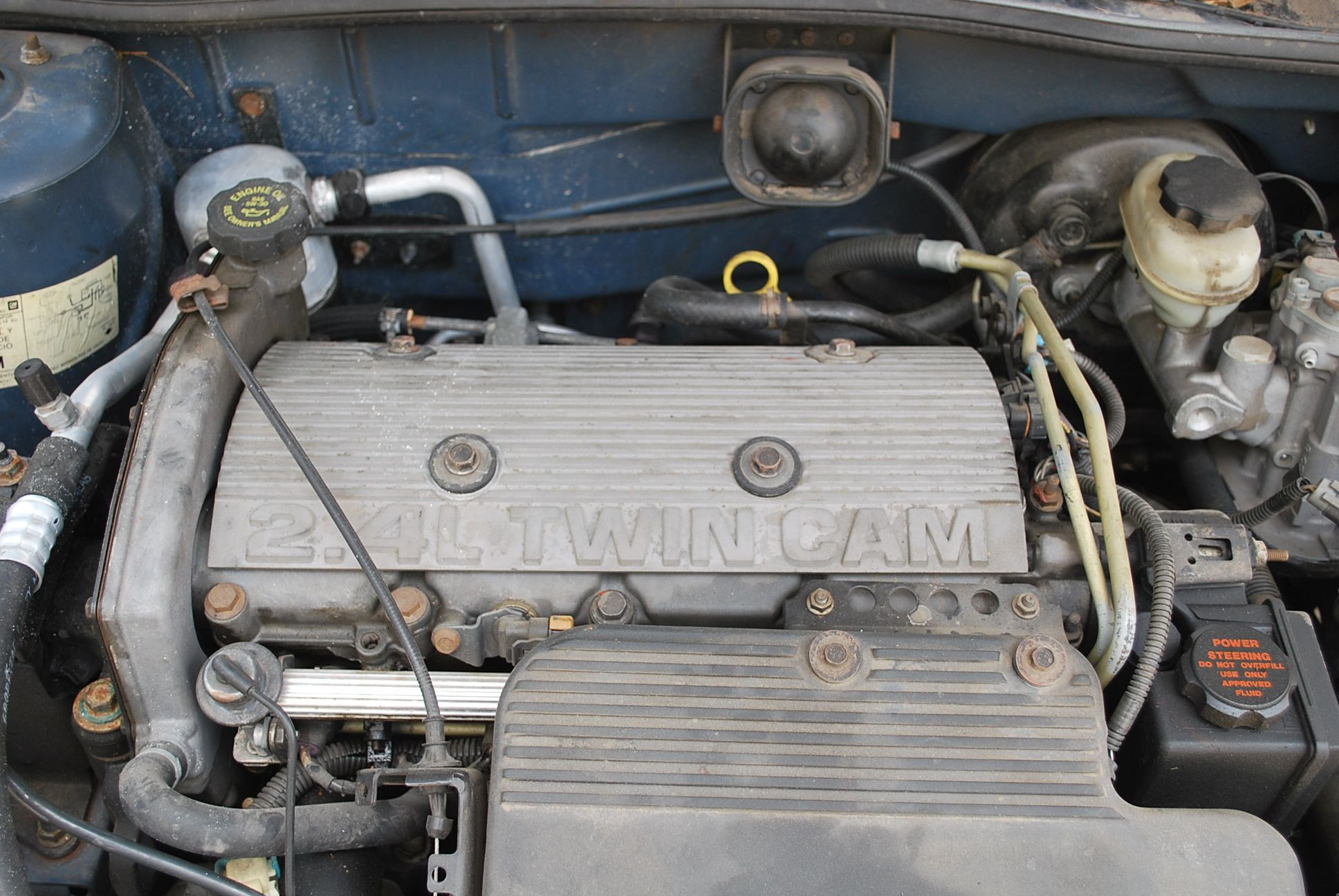
A 2.4-liter Twin Cam in 1997 Pontiac Sunfire

The LD9 Twin Cam was a 2.4-liter Quad 4 variant that debuted in 1996 with balance shafts and a redesigned cylinder head. In the mid-1990s, these engines, like their earlier 2.3-liter counterparts, were known for timing chain failures, as well as water pump failures, in which the water pumps were often difficult and costly to access and replace. LD9s also had very small oil passages, making for less than adequate lubrication, and costly engine repairs if not maintained properly. Bore was decreased from 92 to 90 mm (3.62 to 3.54 in) and stroke increased from 85 to 94 mm (3.35 to 3.70 in) for better torque. Power came in at 150 bhp (112 kW). This engine received a minor update halfway through the 1999 model year that eliminated the exhaust gas recirculation, increased the compression ratio from 9.5:1 to 9.7:1, and switched from low impedance fuel injectors to high impedance. For increased reliability this engine also saw other minor updates in the 2000s towards the end of its use in General Motors vehicles. In 2001, changes included a smaller knock sensor, flat-top pistons instead of dished, new oiling passages, newer stronger timing chain, a redesigned water pump, a redesigned starter motor, and a higher capacity catalytic converter. An improved belt-tensioner was introduced in 2002.

==== Specifications post-1999 ====
Engine type	Multivalve DOHC straight-four engine
Bore × Stroke	90 mm × 94 mm (3.54 in × 3.70 in)
Displacement	2,392 cc (146.0 cu in)
Compression ratio	9.7:1
Camshaft Specs	198 degrees @ .050" with .354" lift for the intake 187 degrees @ .050" with .346" lift for the exhaust
Fuel delivery	Sequential fuel injection (SFI)
Peak power	150 hp (112 kW) at 5600 rpm
Peak torque	155 lb⋅ft (210 N⋅m) at 4400 rpm
Estimated fuel economy	23 mpg_{‑US} (10 L/100 km; 28 mpg_{‑imp}) city / 33 mpg_{‑US} (7.1 L/100 km; 40 mpg_{‑imp}) highway

Applications:

- 1996–2002 Chevrolet Cavalier Z24
- 1996–2002 Pontiac Sunfire GT
- 1996–2001 Pontiac Grand Am
- 1996–1998 Oldsmobile Achieva
- 1999–2001 Oldsmobile Alero
- 1997–1999 Chevrolet Malibu
- 1996–1998 Buick Skylark

== Prototypes and experimental engines ==
=== Factory prototypes ===
At the same time that Oldsmobile announced the planned high-output "HO" Quad 4 in 1988, they suggested that a turbocharged version producing up to 250 bhp (186 kW) was planned. A turbocharged Quad 4 with a reported 200 hp (149 kW) was installed in an Oldsmobile 98 that was previewed by MotorWeek. A turbocharged Quad 4 was never released as a production option.

The pace car for the 1988 Indianapolis 500 was an Oldsmobile Cutlass Supreme that had been converted into an open car by Cars and Concepts. The engine was a turbocharged 2.3-liter Quad 4 built mainly with factory parts that produced 250 hp (190 kW) at 6400 rpm.

The Oldsmobile Aerotech II and Aerotech III were both released in 1989. The Aerotech II is a wagon-back sports coupe concept with a 2.3-liter Quad 4 making 230 hp (170 kW) with some form of forced induction. The Aerotech III is essentially a preview of the 1990 Oldsmobile Cutlass Supreme sedan, and came with a supercharged 2.3-litre Quad 4 that developed 230 hp (170 kW).

=== Aerotech engines ===
Even before the production Quad 4 was released, Oldsmobile engineering's Chief Engineer Ted Louckes and Future Systems and Technology engineer Bill Porterfield had begun a program looking for more power and higher efficiency from the engine. Part of the project included building the Oldsmobile Aerotechs in pursuit of new land speed records. Two new twin-cam four-cylinder engines were built, based not on production Quad 4 parts, but on a set of engineering parameters derived from the engine, which Oldsmobile referred to as the "production architecture." Under this scheme the derivative engines had to keep the Quad 4's four-stroke combustion cycle, double overhead cams, multi-valve cylinder head and, significantly, 100 mm (3.94 in) bore spacing.

==== Batten RE engine ====
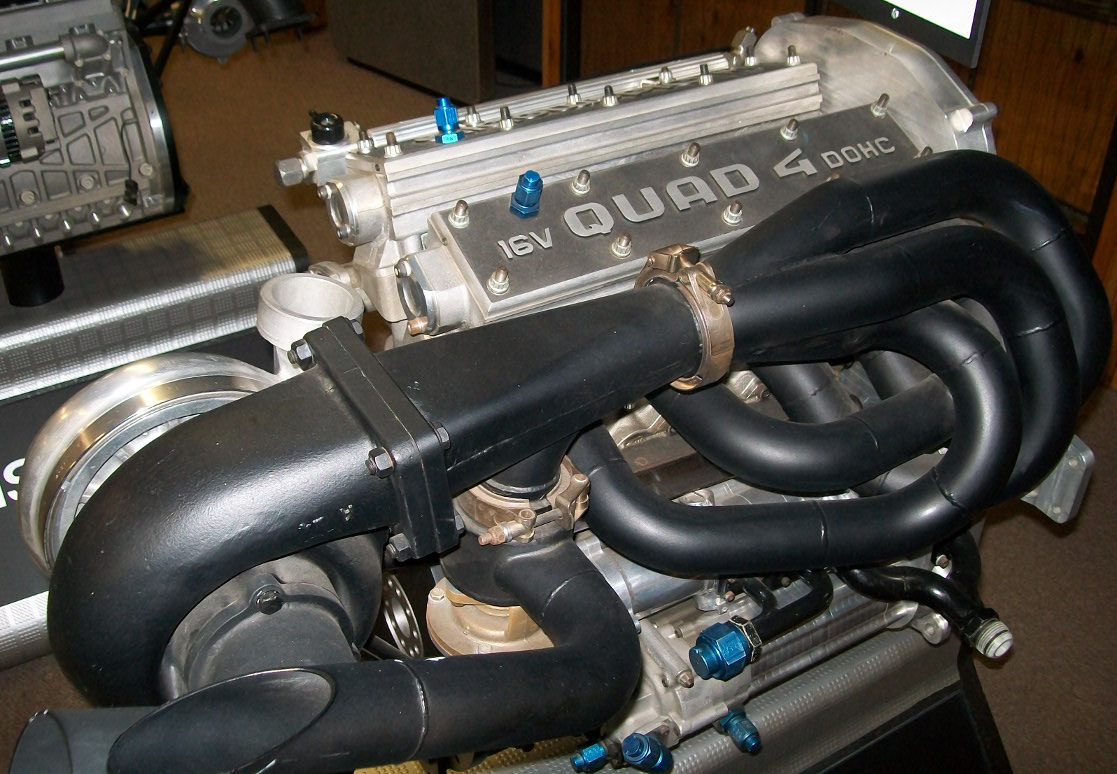
Batten RE engine with single turbo

The Batten RE engine was designed by Rudy Sayn and Andy Schwartz of Batten Heads in Detroit, and followed the restrictions set out by Oldsmobile. The engine's cylinder head, block, and sump are all of aluminum alloy, with the sump also able to handle structural loads. The RE also has an unusual coolant distribution manifold. The RE's designers retained the valve angles and sizes, pent-roof combustion chambers, dual chain-driven camshafts, and stock piston crown shapes of the production Quad 4.

The RE is a wet sleeve design, with four cast iron cylinder liners attached to an upper cylinder block deck plate. With a bore of 3.5 in (89 mm) and a stroke of 3.1 in (79 mm), the engine displaced 1,955 cc (119.30 cu in).

The electronic fuel injection system came from Rochester Products, while Delco Electronics provided the engine's high-voltage ignition system. The RE was fitted with a single turbocharger from Garrett AiResearch.

Output estimates for the Batten RE engine range from 750 to 900 hp (560 to 670 kW). A Batten RE engine powered the short-tail Aerotech car.

Applications: Oldsmobile Aerotech short-tail

==== Feuling BE engine ====
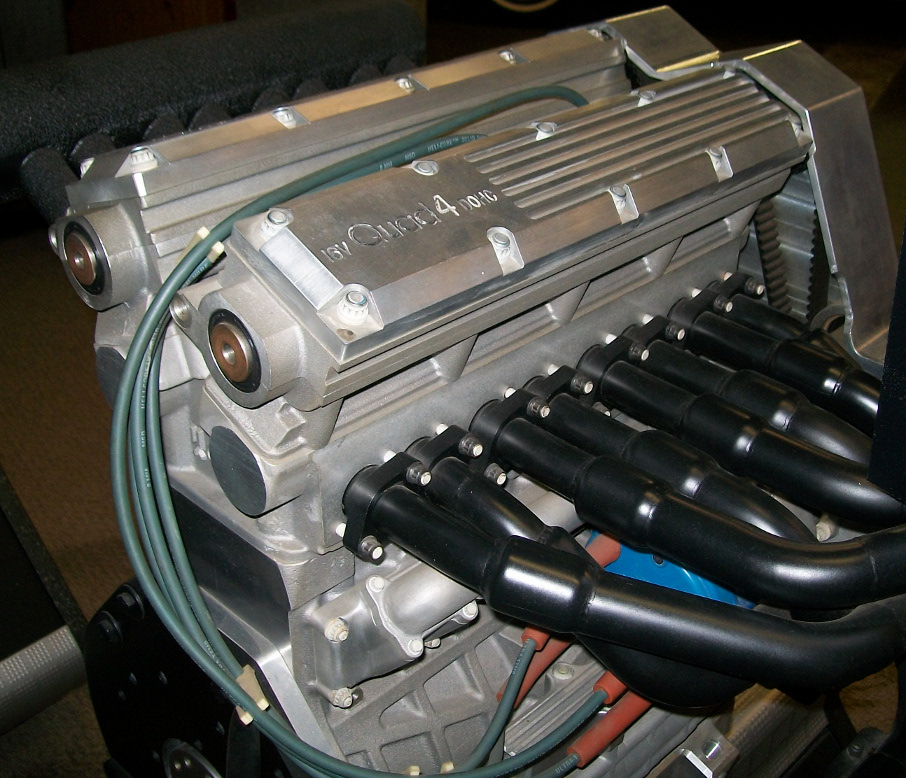
Twin-turbo Feuling BE engine with one external port per valve

In Ventura, California, Feuling Engineering undertook development of an experimental engine subject to the same set of restrictions set by Oldsmobile. Feuling's design focused on thermal efficiency and heat rejection. Like the Batten engine, Feuling's BE is an all-aluminum design, with an alloy sump able to handle structural loads. The Feuling block was developed by Keith Black Racing Engines, who produced a Y-block with deep skirts. This engine was also linered — in this case by a set of aluminum/Nikasil liners courtesy of Mahle.

The engine's camshaft profiles were the result of a collaboration between Feuling, Engle Manufacturing Company, and Dick Jones Camshafts. In the BE, the camshafts are driven by timing belts rather than chains. Each intake and exhaust valve has its own external port. External manifolding connects each exhaust port to one of two different turbochargers.

Feuling later used a similar cylinder head design on what is reported to be a Cosworth block to create a Feuling/Oldsmobile V8 engine intended for Indianapolis. This was a different engine than Oldsmobile's own Aurora IMSA/IRL racing V8.

Output of the Feuling BE engine is estimated to have been approximately 1,000 hp (750 kW). It was used in the long-tail Aerotech car.

Applications: Oldsmobile Aerotech long-tail

=== Quad 8 ===
In an episode of MotorWeek from early 1988, a photo is shown of an Oldsmobile V8 engine developed using Quad 4 technology. The engine is called the Quad 8. What was shown was apparently a mock-up of the engine, possibly built by Feuling Engineering. The engine made an appearance at a Specialty Equipment Market Association (SEMA) show in Las Vegas, but did not go into production. The Quad 8 was featured in an article in the June 1993 issue of American Rodder magazine.

== See also ==
- List of GM engines
