= Oldsmobile Aerotech =

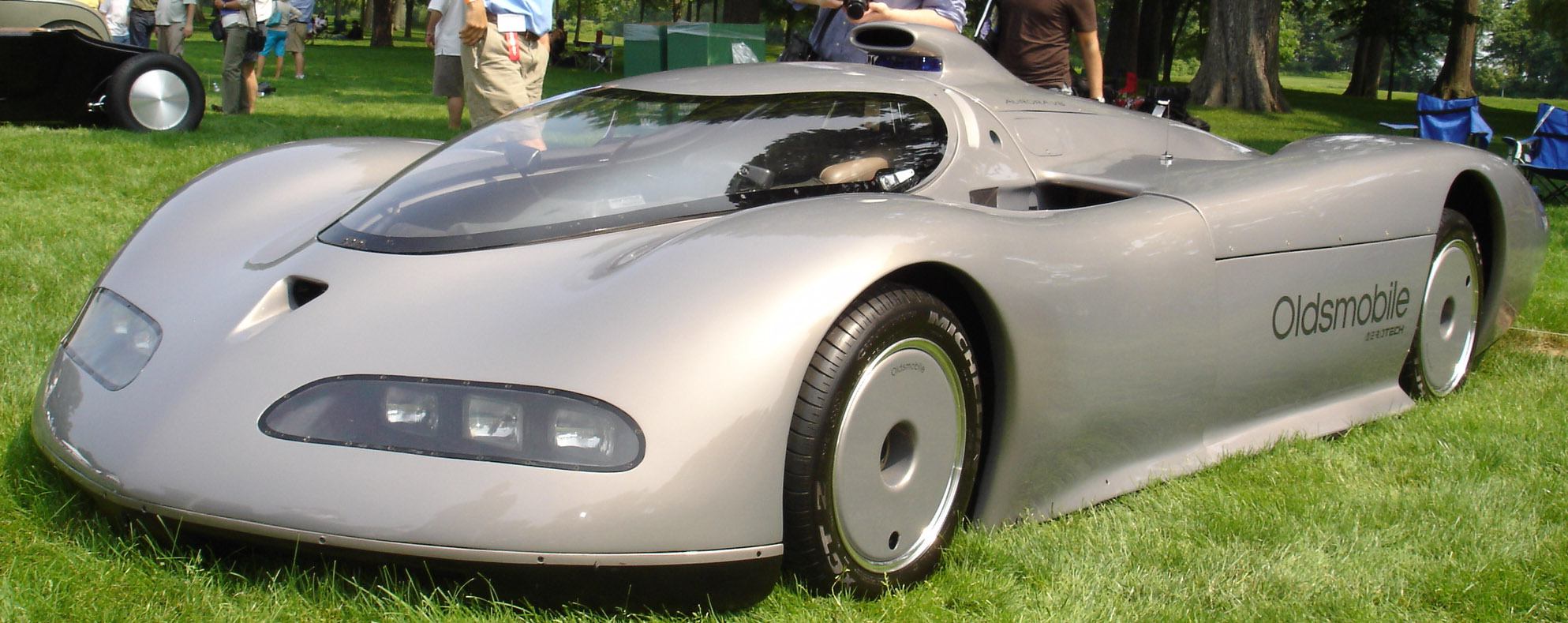

Overview
- Manufacturer: Oldsmobile
- Also called: Aerotech ST; Aerotech LT; Aurora Aerotech
- Production: 1987–1992
- Assembly: Lansing, Michigan, United States
- Designer: Ed Welburn (1985)

Body and chassis
- Class: Development prototype
- Body style: 1-door coupé
- Layout: Rear mid-engine, rear-wheel-drive
- Platform: March 84C CART (modified)

Powertrain
- Engine: 2 L (122.0 cu in) turbocharged Quad 4; 2 L (122.0 cu in) twin-turbocharged Quad 4; 3,995 cc (243.8 cu in) Aurora V8
- Transmission: 5-speed manual

Dimensions
- Wheelbase: 2,827 mm (111.3 in)
- Length: 4,882 mm (192.2 in)
- Width: 2,184 mm (86 in)
- Height: 1,016 mm (40 in)
- Curb weight: 726 kg (1,600 lb)

Oldsmobile Aerotech refers primarily to a series of three experimental high-speed vehicles built between 1987 and 1992, with the first two created to demonstrate the potential of Oldsmobile's new Quad 4 engine design. An Aerotech driven by four-time Indianapolis 500 winner A. J. Foyt set a world closed-course speed record on August 27, 1987. Oldsmobile used the Aerotech name on two unrelated concept cars in 1989.

== History ==
The Oldsmobile Quad 4 is a straight-four engine with four valves per cylinder and dual overhead camshafts (DOHC) — the first volume production engine designed entirely in the US to have these features. The factory Quad 4 produced 150 hp (112 kW) and 160 lb⋅ft (217 N⋅m) of torque in its initial configuration.

The engineers behind the development of the Quad 4 engine were eager to showcase the engine's capabilities. Under the leadership of Ted Louckes, head of the Quad 4 engine program, they convinced top management at General Motors to develop a research vehicle which would demonstrate the engine's true potential. In 1985, a group of engineers under the leadership of Louckes was formed to develop just such a vehicle, called the Aerotech. Ed Welburn, then assistant chief designer at the Oldsmobile studio, led the design effort.

The initial design sketches of the car were inspired by Le Mans winning race cars such as the Porsche 917. Completed in early 1985, the design was quickly approved by GM's top management, and the first mockup was finished shortly afterwards. Wind tunnel testing showed that the shape was aerodynamically efficient but would benefit from a few enhancements suggested by Max Schenkel, an aerodynamicist at General Motors who also served as a staff engineer on the Aerotech project. After extensive wind tunnel testing at General Motors' Technical Center at Warren, Michigan it was decided to alter the design by rounding off the nose and refining the canopy design. The air intakes were also moved from the sides of the car to the top of the fenders. Welburn had originally wanted the car to have faired-in wheel wells but Goodyear engineers working with Oldsmobile had concerns about excessive heat buildup in the covered space.

Welburn's original design incorporated a long tail inspired by the Porsche 917LH, which ran counter to Louckes' plan for setting a closed-course record on the Indianapolis Motor Speedway. A long-tail version would hinder the car's handling despite providing a lower coefficient of drag. A short-tail version coupled with a pedestal rear spoiler was deemed more feasible.

Construction of the first car was completed by the end of 1986, and was tested by Foyt at the General Motors proving grounds at Mesa, Arizona. Although skeptical about the car's potential as first, Foyt managed to take the car to 218 mph (351 km/h) on the test track. He is said to have admired the car for its stability at high speeds.

As development neared completion, General Motors' senior management withheld permission for the record attempt to be held at the General Motors test track. The development team then chose to test the car at a 7.712-mile (12.411 km) test track near Fort Stockton Texas.

After successful runs at the General Motors proving grounds, the development team decided to test Welburn's long-tail design as well. Construction of a second car with this configuration had begun in late 1985. The second car was almost the same as the first but featured elongated rear bodywork tapering downwards and a different engine, with a twin-turbocharged 2.0-liter BE engine built by Feuling Engineering in place of the 2.0-liter single-turbocharged Batten RE. The BE engine proved capable of generating a maximum power output in excess of 1,000 hp (746 kW).

== Features ==
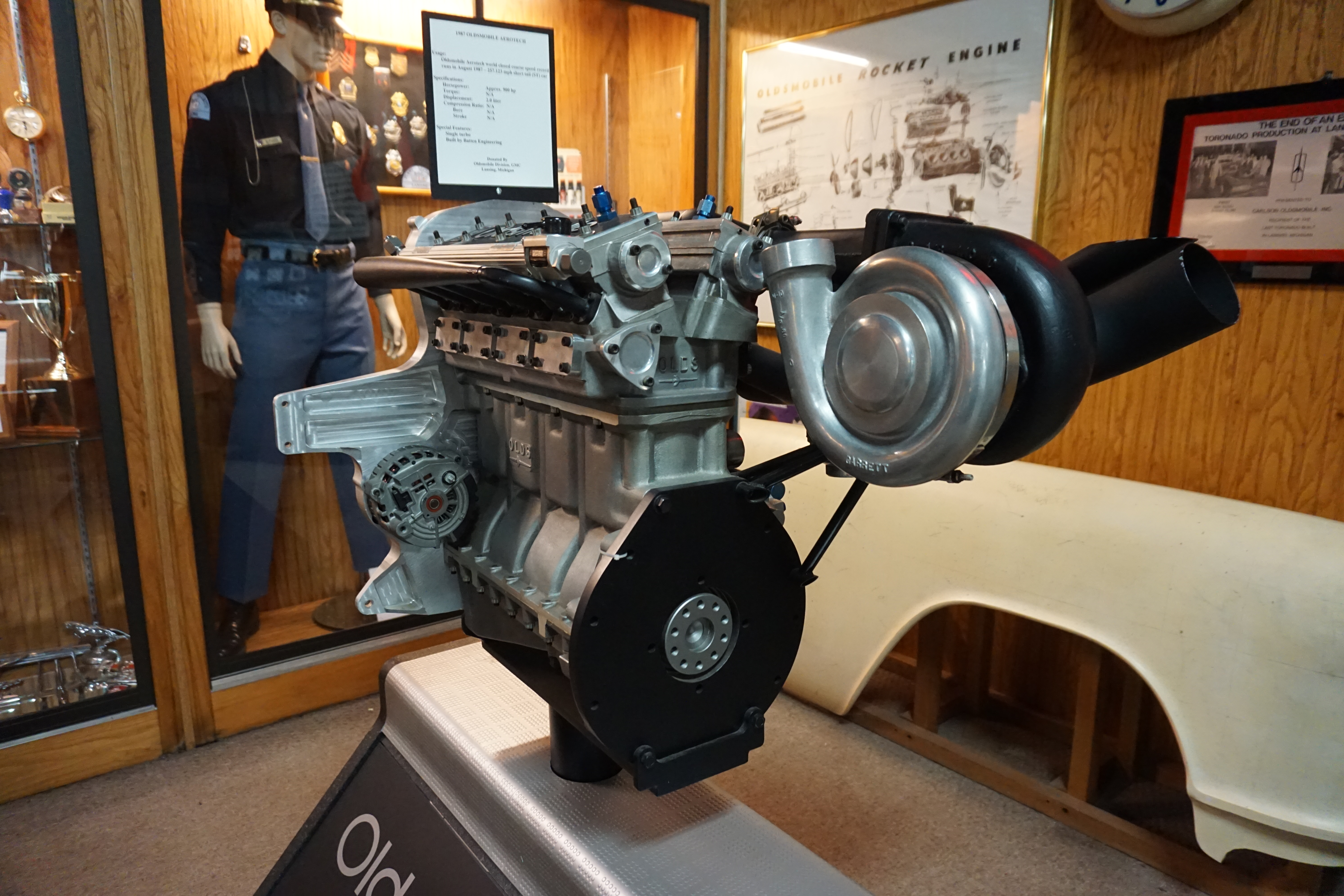
Oldsmobile Aerotech engine at the R. E. Olds Transportation Museum

The cars are built on modified March 85C CART chassis similar to that of the 1985 Indianapolis 500 winning car. Sleek carbon fiber bodywork kept both weight and drag to a minimum. The cars' underbody incorporated adjustable panels that could change the airflow through the underbody tunnels. This system not only generated large amounts of downforce but also allowed the engineers to optimize the system for different race tracks.

The first two Aerotechs were originally powered by DOHC, four-cylinder engines that were based, not on production Quad 4 parts, but rather on a set of engineering parameters derived from the engine, which Oldsmobile referred to as the "production architecture." Under this scheme the derivative engines had to keep the Quad 4's four-stroke combustion cycle, double overhead cams, multi-valve cylinder head and, significantly, 100 mm (3.94 in) bore spacing. Batten Heads of Detroit developed the Batten RE engine with a single turbocharger with an estimated output that ranged from 750 to 900 hp (560 to 670 kW). This engine was used in the short-tail (ST) car. Feuling Engineering of Ventura, California developed the twin-turbocharged Feuling BE engine producing an estimated 1,000 hp (750 kW), which was installed in the long-tail (LT) Aerotech.

== Speed record runs ==
On August 26, 1987, the development team tested the two completed cars on the Fort Stockton test track in the presence of FIA officials. Initial tests with the short-tail version of the car resulted in an average speed of 250.919 mph (403.815 km/h), falling just short of the closed-course speed record set by the Mercedes CIII-IV development prototype. As the team adjusted the car's aerodynamics, Foyt tested the second, long-tail car. The long-tail version proved to be even more capable than its short-tail sibling, allowing Foyt to reach a top speed of 275 mph (443 km/h) in the flying mile after some practice runs.

Foyt set a new speed record with the long-tail version the next day, averaging 267.399 mph (430.337 km/h) after flying-mile runs in both directions of the track. Subsequent runs made with the now modified short-tail version resulted in a new closed-course speed record of 257.123 mph (413.799 km/h), beating Mercedes' record by a large margin.

The speed records garnered considerable publicity for Oldsmobile, and helped boost sales. The Aerotechs made several appearances at autoshows across North America. A non-functional mockup with a makeshift interior also made appearances at various circuit races.

== Aurora Aerotech and endurance runs ==
Between December 7 and 15, 1992, a third Aerotech was built, and the two earlier cars were brought out of storage and made ready to run with the addition of functional lights. All three cars were now powered by 4.0-liter Oldsmobile Aurora V8 engines. The three cars broke 47 speed endurance records, including the 10,000- and 25,000-kilometer world speed records. Other national and international speed records ranging from 10 kilometers to 24 hours were achieved by a team of drivers working 24 hours a day for 8 days. These records were also set at the Fort Stockton test track.

Welburn was given the opportunity to personally drive the Aurora Aerotech in December 2010. During that run the car was limited to 61 mph (98 km/h) to prevent damage to the internal components.

== Aerotech II ==
Released in 1989, the Aerotech II is a wagon-back sports coupe concept with a 2.3-liter Quad 4 making 230 hp (170 kW) that made its debut at the North American International Auto Show in Detroit. It is unclear whether the engine was supercharged or turbocharged.

== Aerotech III ==
Released the same year as the Aerotech II, the Aerotech III is essentially a preview of the 1990 Oldsmobile Cutlass Supreme sedan, and came with a supercharged 2.3-litre Quad 4 that developed 230 hp (170 kW).

== Aerotech go-kart ==
Approximately 70 go-karts were produced with Aerotech-style bodies as promotional items for display in Oldsmobile dealerships. Built by Bird Engineering, the karts have steel tubular chassis with fiberglass bodies painted two-tone silver with red accents. Power goes from a 3 hp (2.2 kW) Briggs & Stratton single-cylinder engine through a centrifugal clutch and drive chain to 6 in (150 mm) wheels. Braking is by a single rear drum.
