= Chevrolet Cavalier =

Compact car

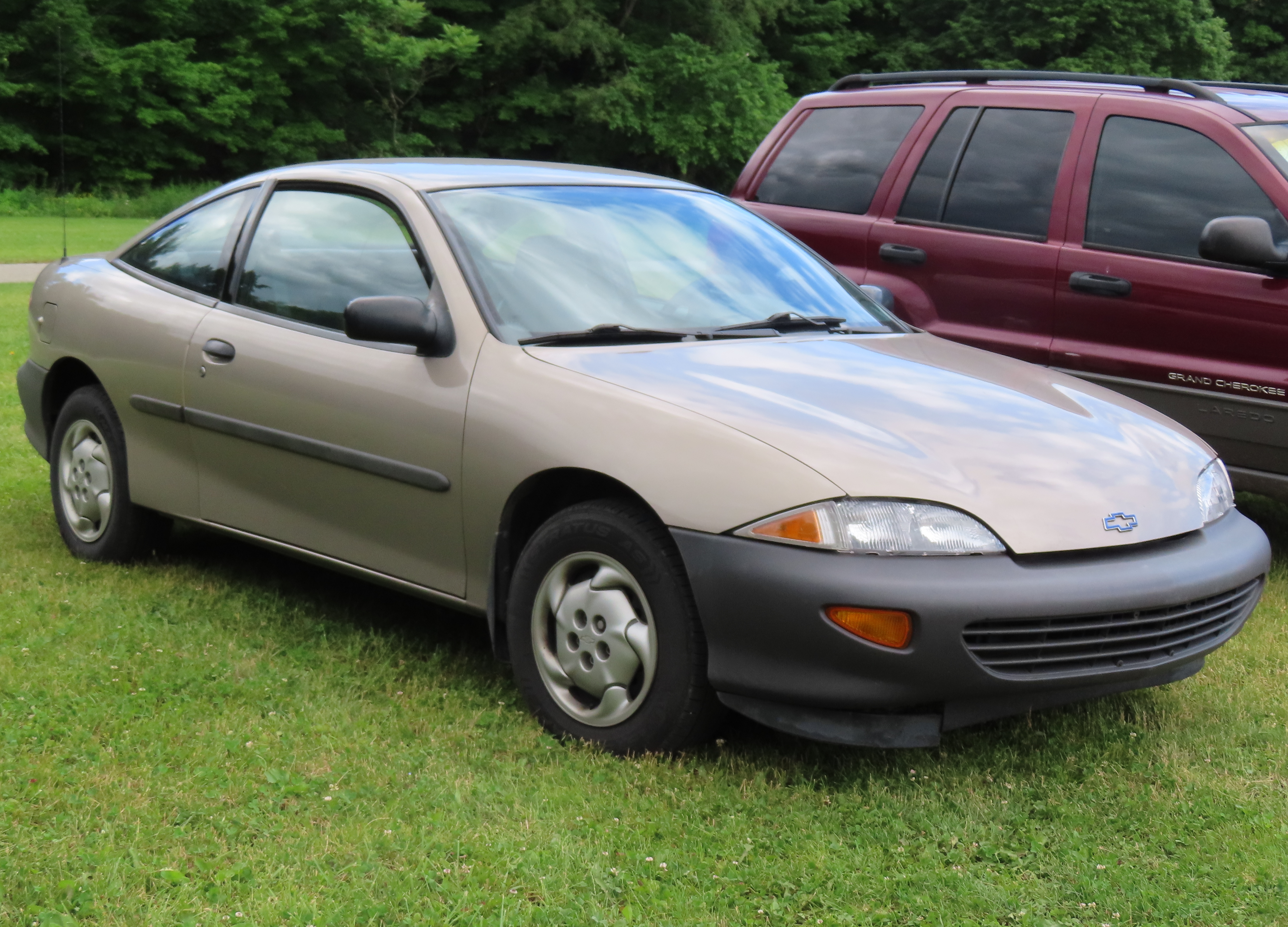
- 1996 Chevrolet Cavalier coupe

Overview
- Manufacturer: Chevrolet (General Motors)
- Production: 1981–2005; 2016–2021 (China)
- Model years: 1982–2005; 2016–2021 (China); 2019–2025 (Mexico)

Body and chassis
- Class: Compact car
- Layout: Front-engine, front-wheel-drive
- Platform: J-body (1981–2005)

Chronology
- Predecessor: Chevrolet Monza
- Successor: Chevrolet Cobalt (United States and Canada); Chevrolet Optra (Mexico) and Chevrolet Aveo

The Chevrolet Cavalier is a line of compact cars produced by Chevrolet. Serving as the replacement of the Chevrolet Monza, the Cavalier was the second Chevrolet model line to adopt front-wheel drive. Three versions of the Cavalier have been sold, including three generations sold in North America from model years 1982 to 2005, a version produced by SAIC-GM for China from 2016 to 2021, and a SAIC-GM version produced for Mexico since the 2019 model year.

The Cavalier was among the inaugural vehicles of the GM J platform. One of the first "world cars" of General Motors, the J platform was developed for use by each North American GM division (with the exception of GMC), alongside international models for Opel, Vauxhall, and Holden. Despite sharing chassis underpinnings, J-body cars from Europe and Australia used slightly different body designs and different powertrains; in Europe, the Vauxhall Cavalier and Opel Ascona were marketed as mid-size cars. Initially a divisional counterpart of the Buick Skyhawk, Cadillac Cimarron, Oldsmobile Firenza, and Pontiac J2000, the Cavalier was primarily marketed alongside the Pontiac Sunbird (renamed the Pontiac Sunfire for 1995).

The 1982–2005 Cavalier was produced by multiple GM facilities across North America; all models from the 1990s onward were made at Lordstown Assembly, which became synonymous with the Cavalier and compact Chevrolet models in general from the earlier Chevrolet Vega all the way to the Chevrolet Cruze. For 2005, the Chevrolet Cobalt replaced the model line in North America.

== Predecessors ==
The Cavalier began development in the late 1970s, when Chevrolet sought to replace the compact Monza with a front-wheel drive model line sized between the Chevette subcompact and the front-wheel drive Nova replacement (which was renamed the Citation for production). Serving as a replacement for the Vega, the Monza was offered as a 2-door notchback coupe, 3-door hatchback, and 3-door station wagon (sharing the body of the Vega wagon). Initially developed for the stillborn GM Wankel rotary engine, the rear-wheel drive Monza was reengineered to accommodate V6 and V8 engines up to 350 cu in (5.7 L).

Marketed as one of the smallest and lowest-price American cars, the Chevette hatchback was closer in size to the Volkswagen Beetle, competing primarily against subcompacts from Japanese-brand manufacturers, including the Honda Civic, Datsun B210, and Toyota Corolla. Following the introduction of the Dodge Omni and Ford Fiesta, American manufacturers began transitioning towards front-wheel drive in compacts and subcompacts via both domestically produced vehicles and the use of captive imports.

Along with developing up-to-date chassis underpinnings to replace the Monza, General Motors sought to expand the market appeal of the new model line by expanding the number of available body styles. The notchback coupe and three-door hatchback would make a return, joined by a four-door sedan and five-door station wagon (two body styles offered in mid-size and full-size Chevrolets).

== First generation (1982–1987) ==
First generation
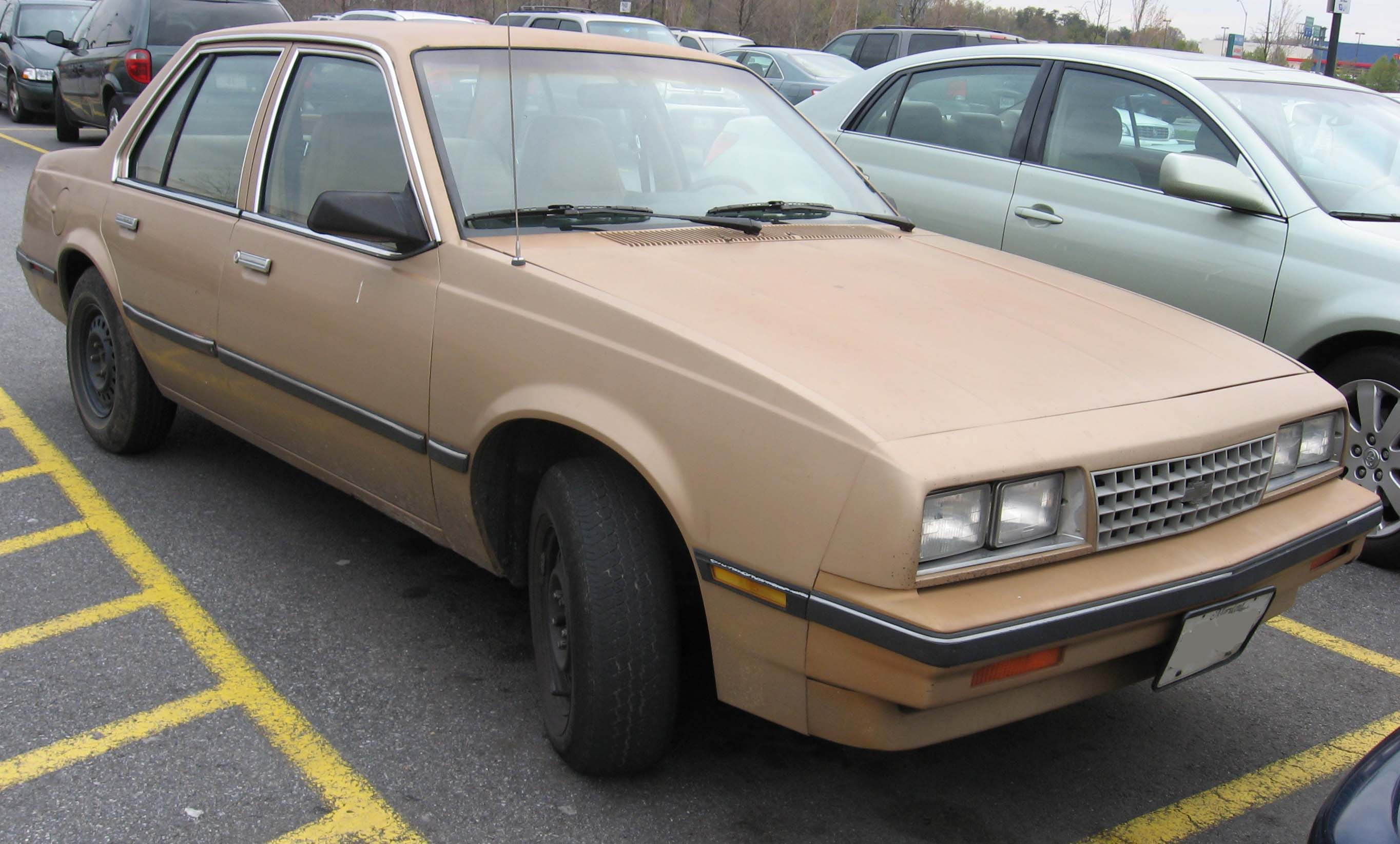
- 1986 Chevrolet Cavalier

Overview
- Production: 1981–1987
- Model years: 1982–1987
- Assembly: United States: Lordstown, Ohio (Lordstown Assembly: 1982–1987); Janesville, Wisconsin (Janesville Assembly: 1983–1987); South Gate, California (South Gate Assembly: 1982 only); Kansas City, Missouri (Leeds Assembly: 1984–1987)
- Designer: Irv Rybicki (1977)

Body and chassis
- Body style: 2-door convertible 2-door coupe 3-door hatchback 4-door sedan 4-door wagon
- Platform: J-body
- Related: Buick Skyhawk; Cadillac Cimarron; Oldsmobile Firenza; Pontiac Sunbird; Opel Ascona; Vauxhall Cavalier; Isuzu Aska; Holden Camira

Powertrain
- Engine: 1.8 L (112 cu in) L46 I4; 2.0 L (122 cu in) LQ5 I4; 2.0 L (122 cu in) LL8 I4; 2.8 L (173 cu in) LB6 V6
- Transmission: 4-speed Muncie M17 manual 5-speed Isuzu MT2 manual 5-speed Getrag 282 manual 3-speed Turbo-Hydramatic 125 C automatic

Dimensions
- Wheelbase: 101.2 in (2,570 mm)
- Length: Sedan: 174.5 in (4,432 mm); Coupe: 173.5 in (4,407 mm); Wagon: 177.9 in (4,519 mm); 1990–91 Wagon: 54.1 in (1,374 mm); 1992–94 Wagon: 53.8 in (1,367 mm) 1988–89: 178.6 in (4,536 mm) 1990–94: 182.3 in (4,630 mm) 1988–89 Wagon: 178.8 in (4,542 mm) 1990–94 Wagon: 181.1 in (4,600 mm)
- Width: Sedan & Coupe: 66.0 in (1,676 mm); Wagon: 66.3 in (1,684 mm)
- Height: Sedan & Coupe: 52.0 in (1,321 mm); Wagon: 54.2 in (1,377 mm)
- Curb weight: 2,359 lb (1,070 kg) (coupe); 2,363 lb (1,072 kg) (sedan); 2,271 lb (1,030 kg) (RS coupe); 2,414 lb (1,095 kg) (RS sedan); 2,558 lb (1,160 kg) (Z24 coupe); 2,665 lb (1,209 kg) (Z24 convertible)

1982 Chevrolet Cavalier CL 2-Door Coupe & 1982 Chevrolet Cavalier CL Station Wagon

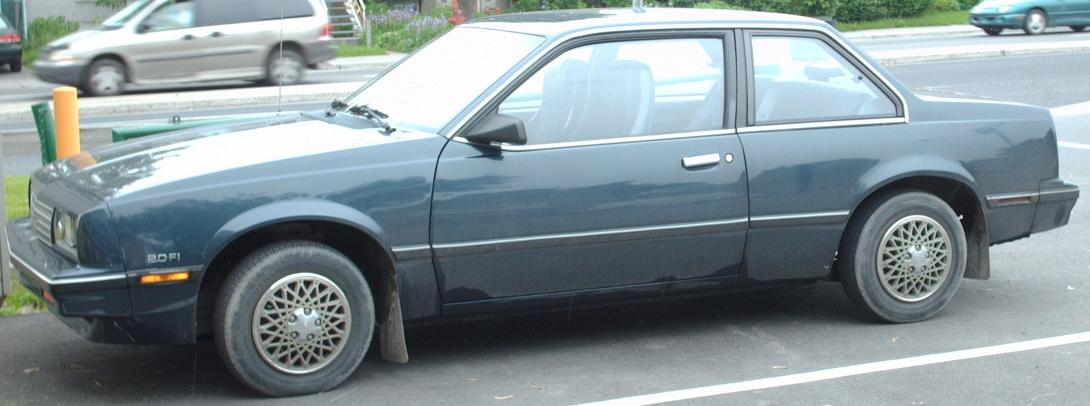
1986–1987 Chevrolet Cavalier coupe

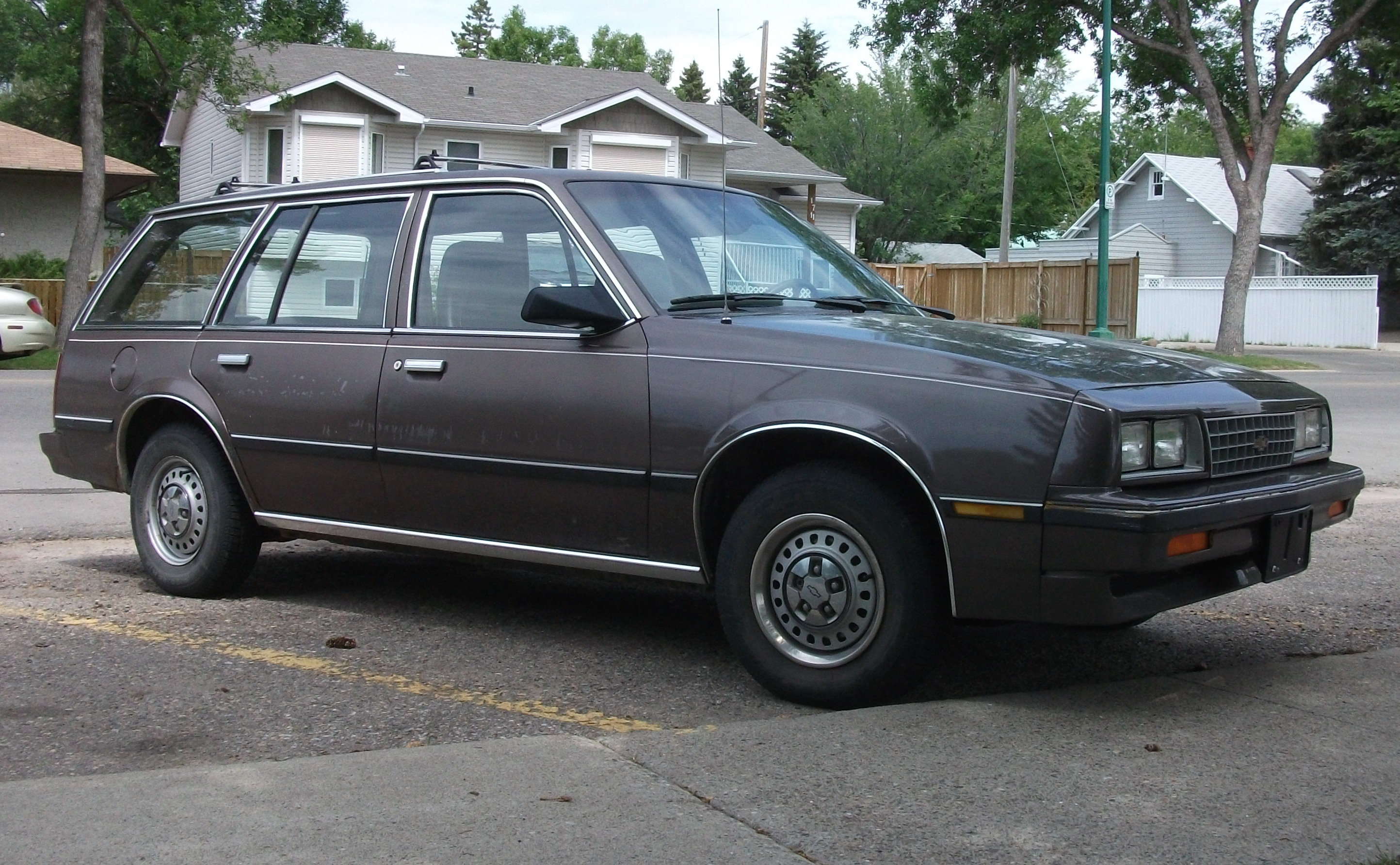
1986–1987 Chevrolet Cavalier wagon

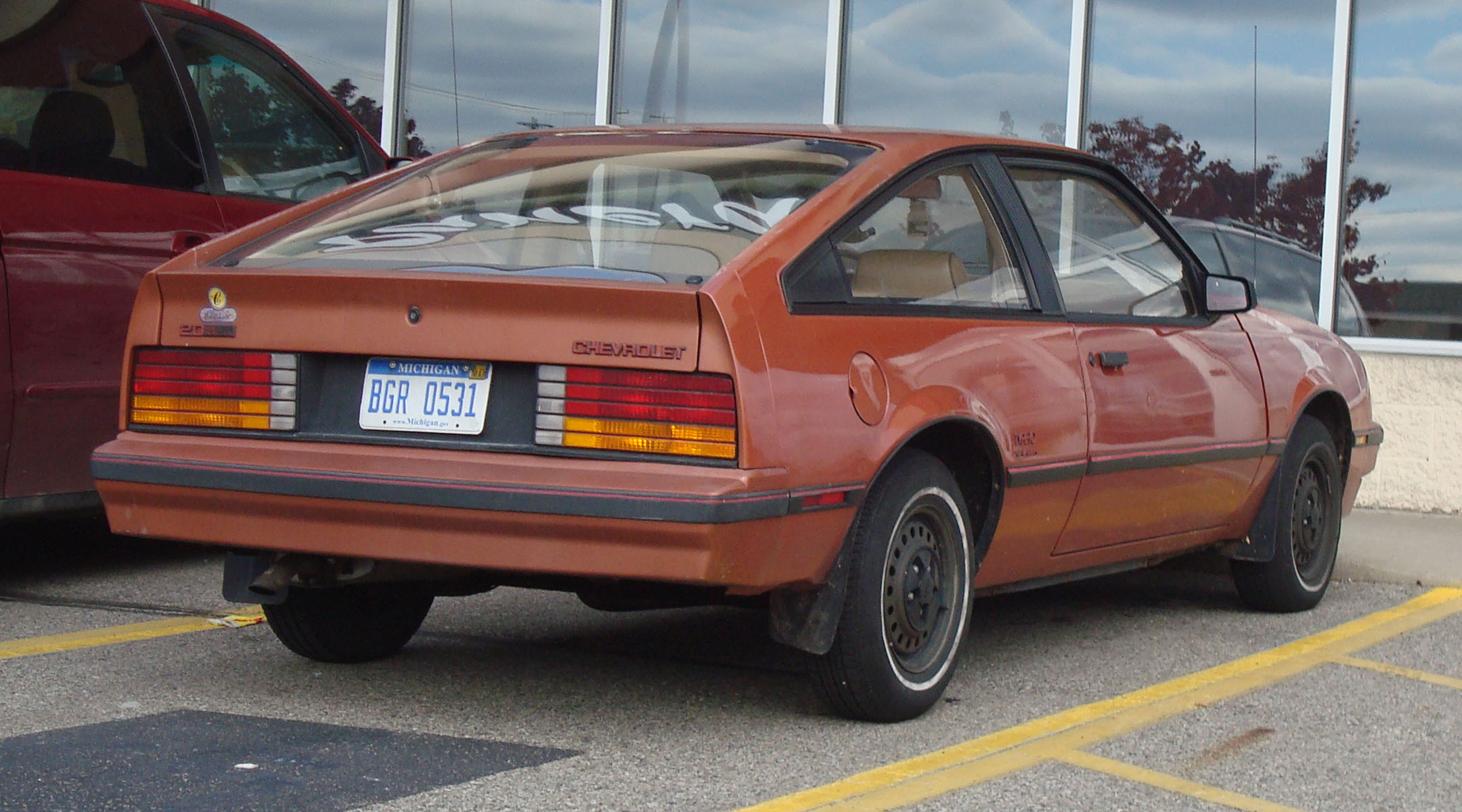
1982–1985 Chevrolet Cavalier Type 10 Hatchback

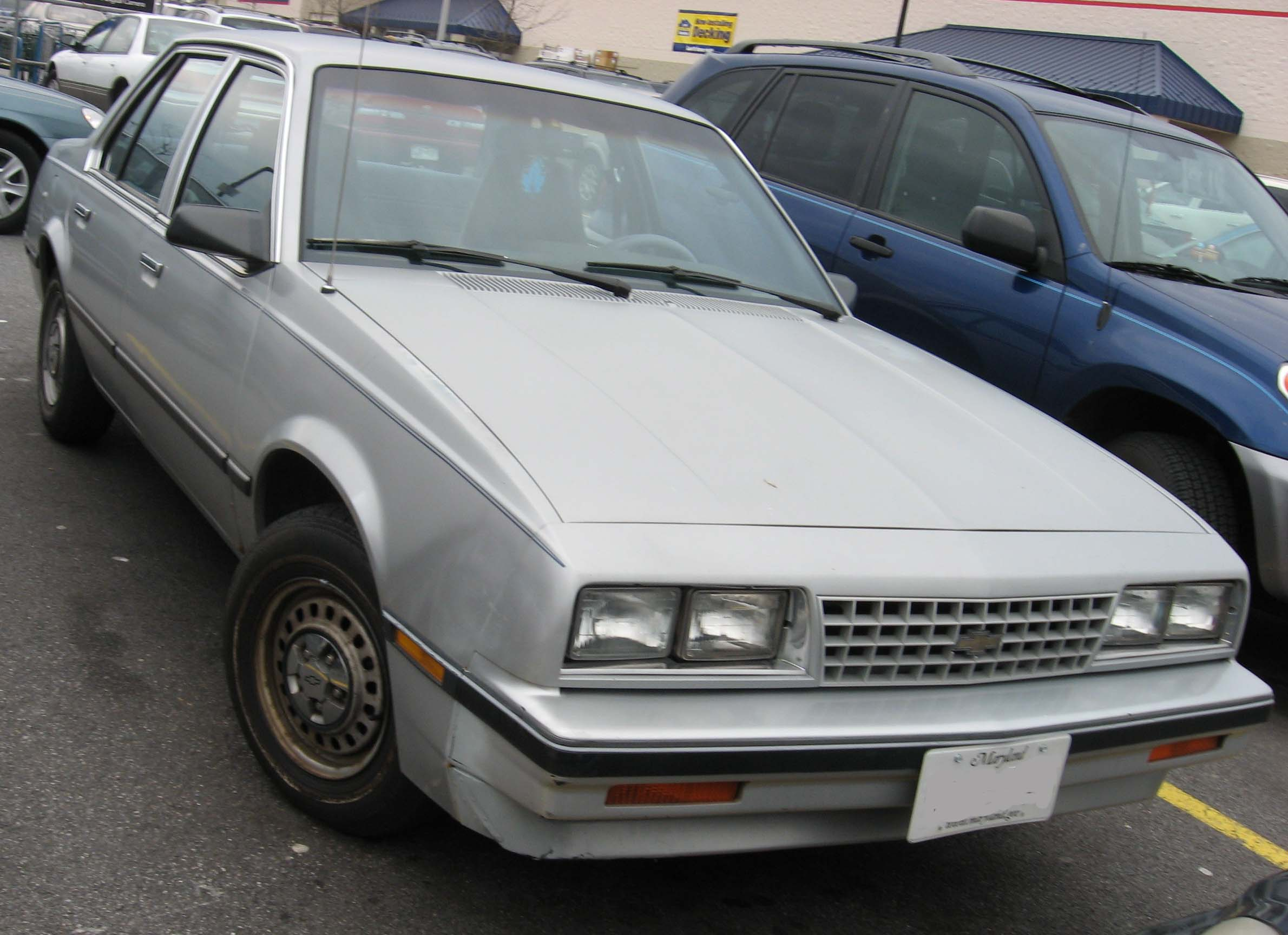
1986–1987 Chevrolet Cavalier CS sedan

The first-generation Cavalier first went on sale in the United States in May 1981 as a 1982 model. The Cavalier name originated from GM's then-British subsidiary Vauxhall, who applied it to badge engineered variants of the Opel Ascona, the third generation of which was the first J-body car to be released.

Initially, the 1.8 liter carbureted L46 inline 4 was the only available engine, and could be mated to either a 4-speed manual or a 3-speed automatic transmission. The Cavalier came in four body styles: a 2-door coupe, 3-door hatchback, 4-door sedan, and a 4-door station wagon. Available trim packages were the entry level Cadet, mid-level Base, and the upscale CL, which could be optioned with two-tone paint, accent stripes, and aluminum alloy wheels. The suspension was shared with the Citation and Celebrity, and consisted of MacPherson struts, lower control arms, coil springs, and a front stabilizer bar. The rear suspension was unique to the Cavalier and featured a solid beam axle, trailing arms, and variable-rate coil springs.

For 1983, the 2.0 liter throttle body fuel-injected LQ5 inline 4 replaced the previous L46 engine, and a 5-speed manual transmission was offered. A convertible model produced by American Specialty Cars was added late in the model year; initial production totaled fewer than 1,000 units. This was the first convertible from Chevrolet since the Caprice convertible had been discontinued in 1975.

For 1984, the Cavalier's styling was lightly refreshed, with a new grille and four rather than two rectangular sealed-beam Headlamps. The Type 10 package, previously available only on the hatchback, was offered on the coupe and convertible models. 5,161 Cavaliers built at the South Gate Assembly plant were festooned with an Olympic special appearance package to celebrate the 1984 Summer Olympics.

For 1985, the 2.8 liter LB6 V6 was added as an optional engine. It was meant to debut with the Z24 package, but said package was delayed until 1986. The V6 was available as an option on all trim levels.

For 1986, the Z24 package was added as on option for the coupe and hatchback models. It featured digital gauges, sport wheels, a ground effects kit, and a specific front fascia. The Type 10 package was discontinued and replaced with the RS package, which was now available on all body styles.

For 1987, both available engines were refreshed. The LQ5 four-cylinder was updated to the LL8 designation, gained 5 horsepower, and the ignition distributor was replaced with a coil pack ignition system. The LB6 V6 gained aluminum cylinder heads, different fuel injectors, and electronic spark control.

Production figures
	Coupe	Hatchback	Sedan	Wagon	Convertible	Yearly total
1982	38,589	34,906	78,368	43,194	-	195,057
1983	45,200	25,869	86,135	60,756	627	218,587
1984	103,204	44,146	200,318	109,457	5,486	462,611
1985	106,021	25,508	179,983	68,132	4,108	383,752
1986	147,676	25,776	193,021	59,843	5,785	432,101
1987	132,921	10,815	150,552	46,140	5,826	346,254
Total	573,611	167,020	888,377	387,522	21,832	2,038,362

=== Engines ===
- 1982: 1.8 L L46 carbureted OHV I4
- 1983–1986: 2.0 L LQ5 TBI OHV I4
- 1987: 2.0 L LL8 TBI OHV I4
- 1985–1987: 2.8 L LB6 MPFI OHV V6

== Second generation (1988–1994) ==
Second generation
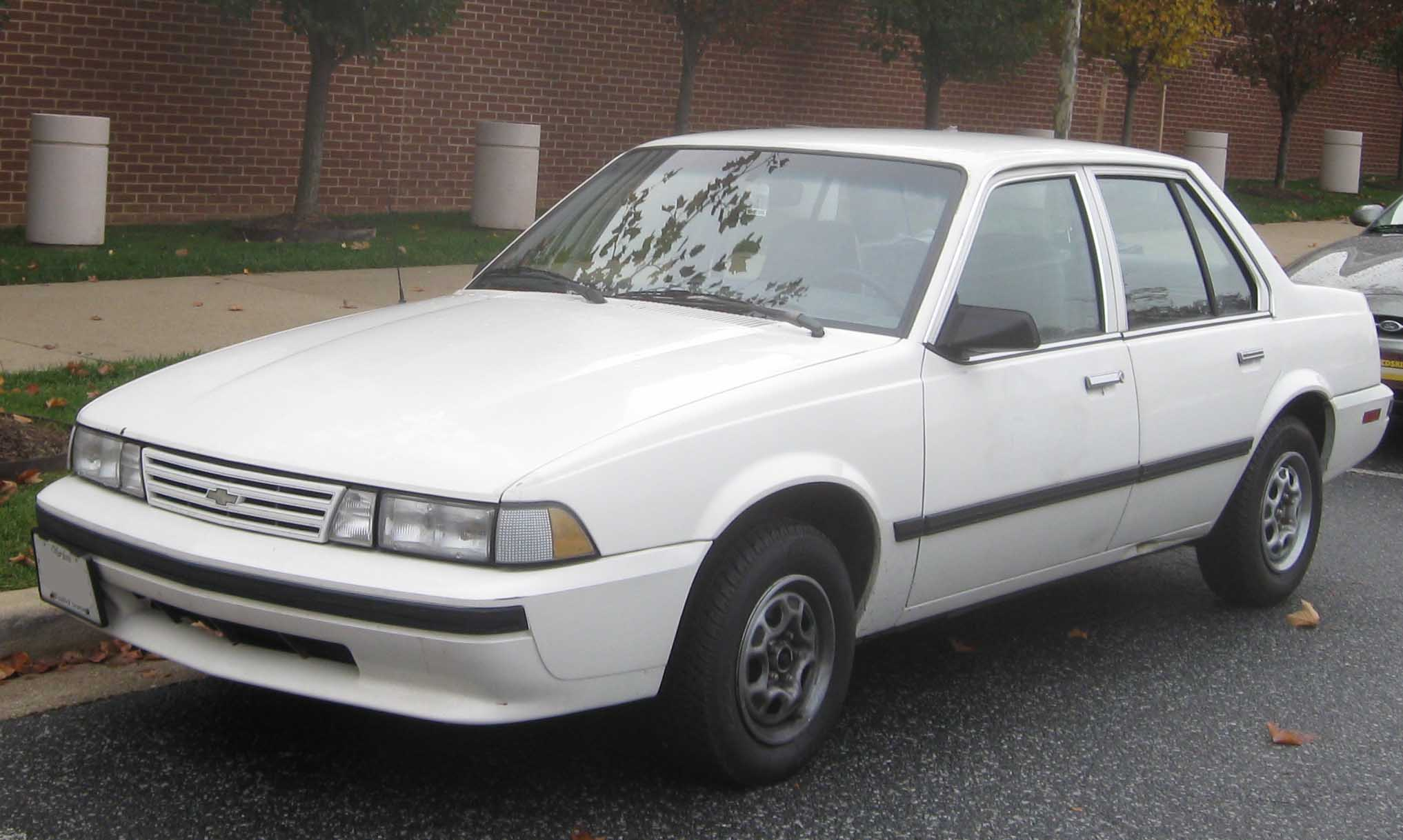

Overview
- Production: 1987–1994
- Model years: 1988–1994
- Assembly: Lordstown, Ohio, United States (Lordstown Assembly: 1988–1994); Janesville, Wisconsin (Janesville Assembly: 1988–1991); Ramos Arizpe, Coahuila, Mexico (Ramos Arizpe Assembly: 1990–1994)
- Designer: Irv Rybicki (1984)

Body and chassis
- Body style: 2-door coupe 2-door convertible 4-door sedan 5-door station wagon
- Platform: General Motors J platform (Series 1J)
- Related: Pontiac Sunbird

Powertrain
- Engine: 1,991 cc (121.5 cu in) LL8 I4; 2,189 cc (133.6 cu in) LM3 I4; 2,189 cc (133.6 cu in) LN2 I4; 2,837 cc (173.1 cu in) LB6 V6; 3,135 cc (191.3 cu in) LH0 V6
- Transmission: 5-speed Getrag 282 manual 3-speed Turbo-Hydramatic 125 C automatic

Dimensions
- Wheelbase: 1988–89: 101.2 in (2,570 mm); 1990–94: 101.3 in (2,573 mm)
- Length: 1988–89: 178.6 in (4,536 mm); 1988–89 Wagon: 178.8 in (4,542 mm); 1990–94: 182.3 in (4,630 mm); 1990–94 Wagon: 181.1 in (4,600 mm)
- Width: 66.3 in (1,684 mm); 1988–89 Sedan/Coupe/Wagon: 66.0 in (1,676 mm)
- Height: 1988–1991 Coupe & 1990–91 Convertible: 52.0 in (1,321 mm); 1988–1991 Sedan: 53.6 in (1,361 mm); 1988–89 & 1992–95 Convertible: 52.2 in (1,326 mm); 1988–89 Wagon: 54.3 in (1,379 mm); 1990–91 Wagon: 54.1 in (1,374 mm); 1992–95 Wagon: 53.8 in (1,367 mm); 1992–95 Coupe: 51.9 in (1,318 mm); 1992–95 Sedan: 53.5 in (1,359 mm)
- Curb weight: 2,359 lb (1,070 kg) (coupe); 2,363 lb (1,072 kg) (sedan); 2,271 lb (1,030 kg) (RS coupe); 2,414 lb (1,095 kg) (RS sedan); 2,558 lb (1,160 kg) (Z24 coupe); 2,665 lb (1,209 kg) (Z24 convertible)

The Cavalier was restyled in 1987 for the 1988 model year. The 3-door hatchback was dropped, while the coupe, sedan, wagon and convertible carried over. The sedan and wagon were unchanged from the doors back, while the coupe's exterior was heavily redesigned, resulting in different trunk designs for the coupe and sedan. Three trim levels were available for 1988: VL for Value Leader, RS, and Z24. The convertible was only available as a Z24, and the dashboard unit from the Type 10 was installed in coupes and convertibles with the Z24 appearance, while the VL and RS used the dashboard unit shared with the Pontiac Sunbird and Cadillac Cimarron. The VL and RS came standard with the 2.0 L OHV L4 engine, now upgraded to throttle-body injection, or TBI, producing 90 hp (67 kW), while the 2.8 L V6 producing 125 hp (93 kW) was optional on the RS and standard on the Z24. With two-door models, a 5-speed manual transmission was standard and a 3-speed automatic was optional, but the 3-speed automatic was made standard on sedans and wagons. An electronic dashboard was available with the RS and Z24 trims, while the front suspension carried over from the previous generation and the rear suspension adopted the torsion-beam rear axle, along with coil springs and rear stabilizer bars from the discontinued Buick Skyhawk, Oldsmobile Firenza, and Cadillac Cimarron.

For 1989, the steering column was redesigned. The new self-aligning steering wheel was designed to reduce injuries in a collision by bending to conform to the driver's chest. Also, rear shoulder belts became standard on all models. RS and Z24 custom cloth seating received a new style of front bucket seats with integral headrests. The optional V6 was retooled to 130 hp.

For 1990, the base engine was enlarged to a 2.2 L OHV L4, and power increased to 95 horsepower (71 kW). Door-mounted automatic front seatbelts were added due to US passive restraint legislation. The optional V6 engine was also upgraded to the 3.1 L V6 and 140 horsepower. The convertible was dropped from availability to prevent internal competition with a planned Beretta convertible. However, the Beretta convertible was shelved at the eleventh hour, before a 1990 Cavalier convertible could be prepared.

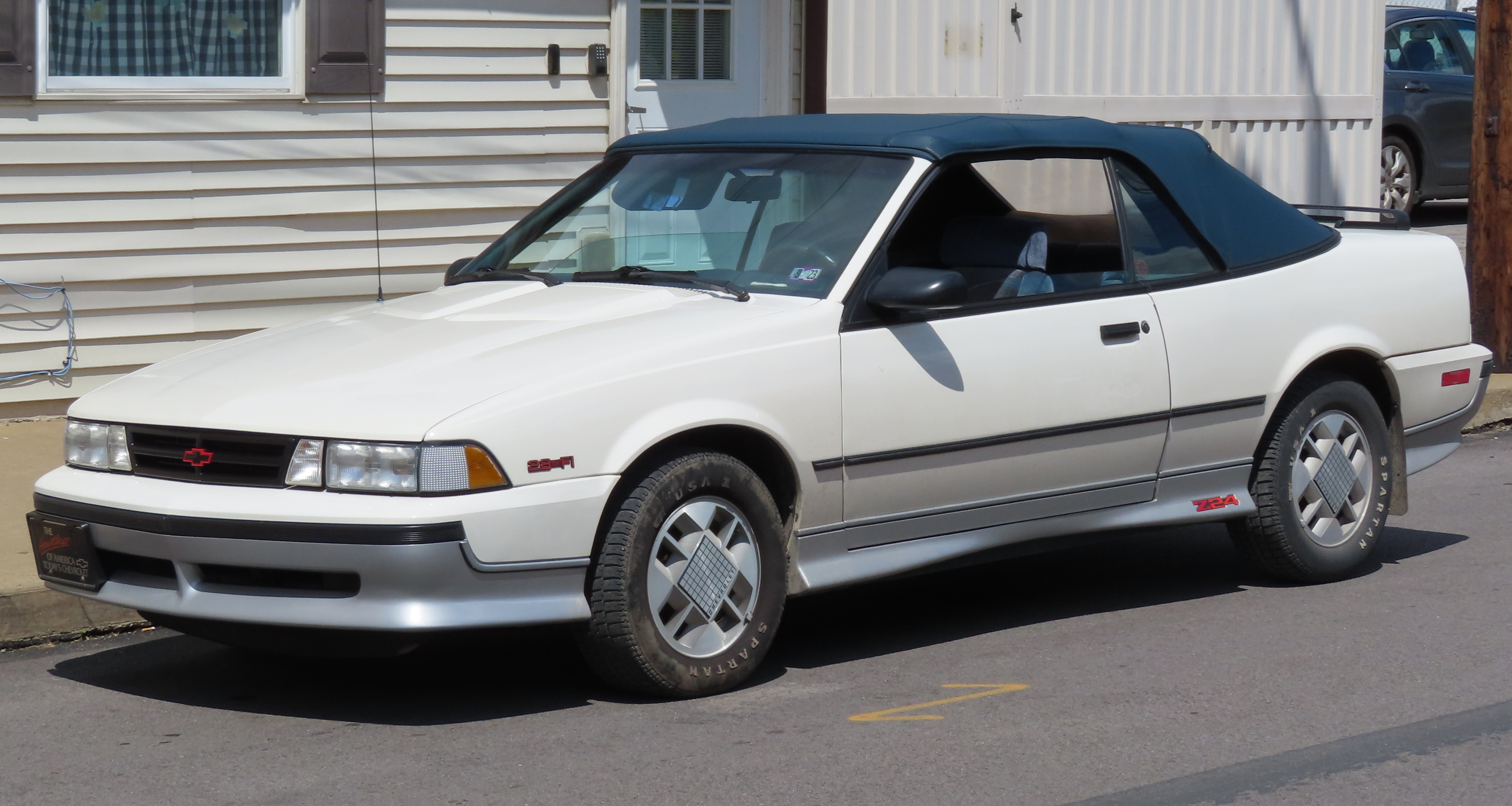
1988 Chevrolet Cavalier Z24 convertible

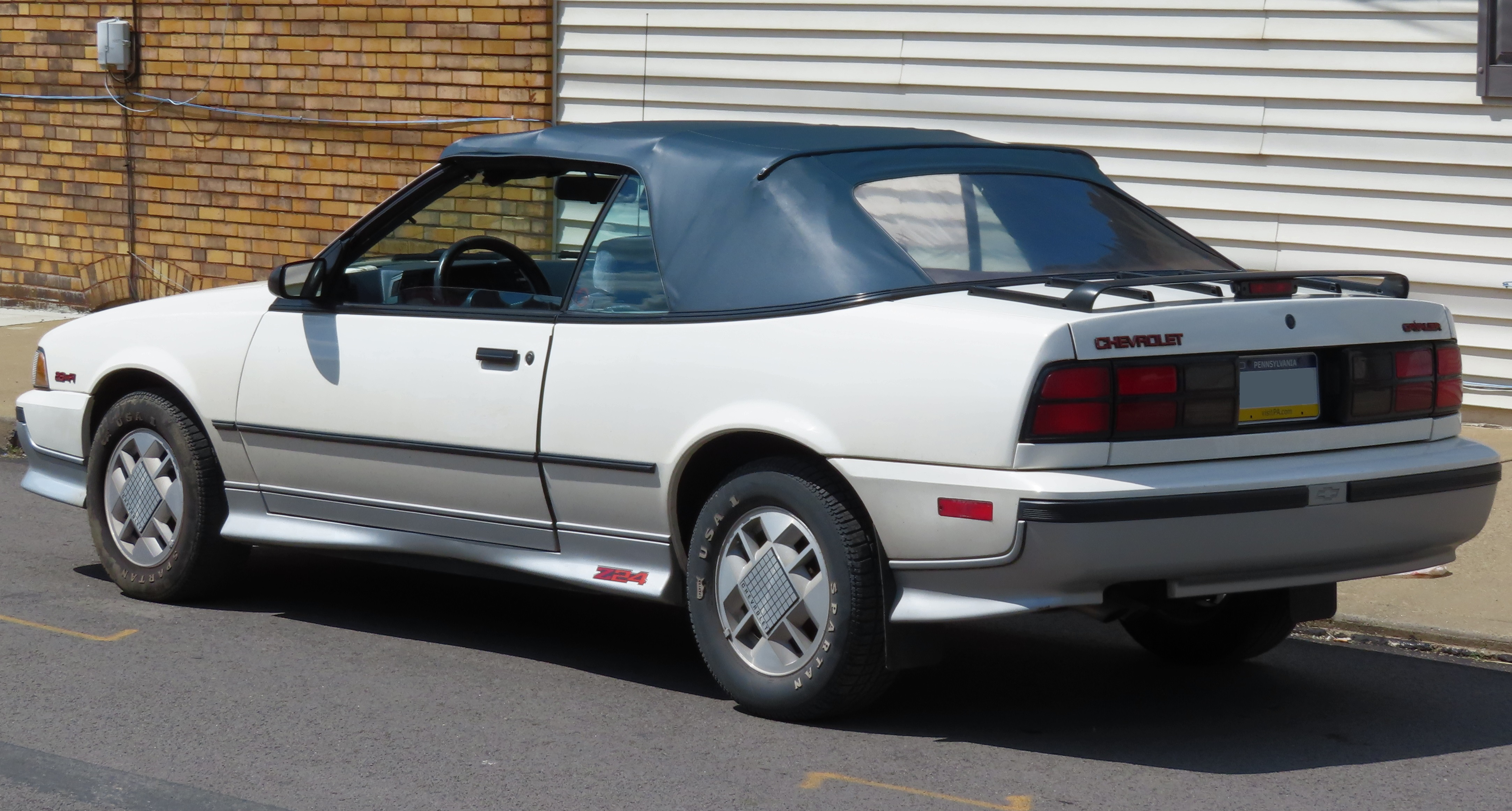
1988 Chevrolet Cavalier Z24 convertible

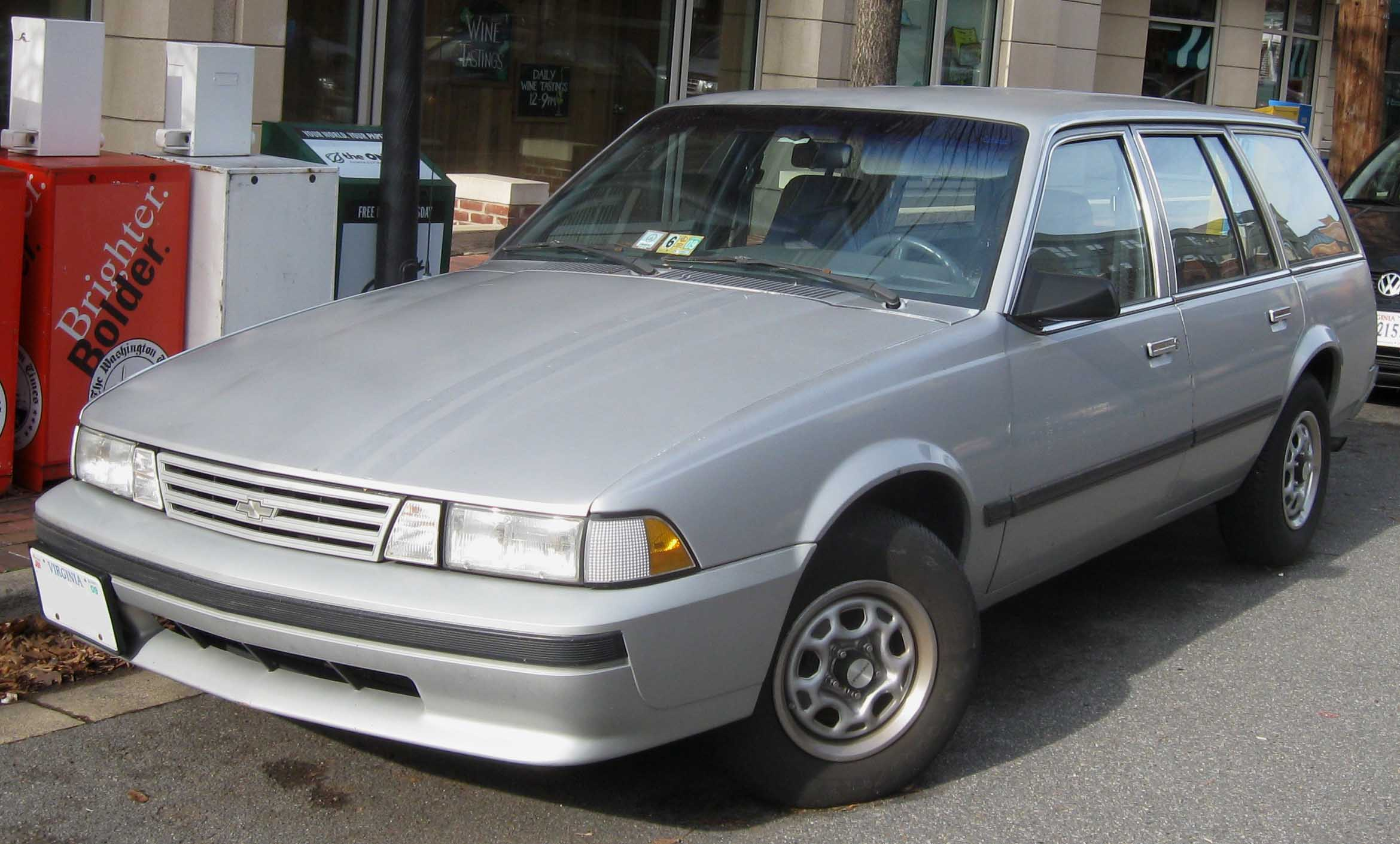
Chevrolet Cavalier wagon (pre-facelift)

=== Facelift (1991) ===
The 1991 Cavalier received a more extensive restyling that involved a new hood, bumpers, headlights, taillights, wheel covers and a redesigned interior; however, the body styles remained unchanged. Most notably, the cooling system was redesigned to draw air from the bumper, giving it a Ford Taurus-style bumper and grille-less nose. The new bumpers were unpainted, with the option to have them colored gray, black, or white, the latter only available on white-colored models. The RS and the Z24 eschewed this for a color-keyed body package. Z24 models also gained the options for a height-adjustable driver's seat and a CD player. The platform and trim lines were carried over. Since the Beretta convertible ended up not being produced, the Cavalier convertible was brought back in the middle of the model year in RS trim only, with the V6 engine standard.

Minor changes for 1991 also included the Alpha Tech ignition lock cylinder, which incorporated a dual-bit key that was larger and thicker in size in comparison to the old single-bit lock cylinder system that had been used for years. The lock system was intended to be a stronger deterrent to vehicle theft, but constant problems were reported with the lock jamming. It was dropped after an improved dual-bit single key system was introduced for the 1995 model year and redesign.

For 1992, the 2.2 L OHV standard engine adopted multi-point fuel injection, or MPFI to improve output to 110 hp (82 kW), unlike the SFI version of the 2.2L in the Chevrolet Corsica. The convertible was now available in both RS and Z24 trims, with the V6 standard in the Z24 and optional with the RS. Anti-lock brakes were added as a standard feature, as Delco Moraine had managed to develop a low-cost system. Power locks were also standard, and were designed to automatically lock when the car is shifted out of park, or if the car is traveling at least eight miles per hour in manual transmission equipped coupe models.

The 1993 model year brought minimal changes to the Cavalier line. The convertibles received a glass rear window, allowing rear window defrost as an option. Also, the RS trim received a minor styling change that did away with its grille slot.

The 1994 models were also carryovers, as a redesign of the Cavalier was in development. Both of the wagon's trim levels—the VL and RS—were dropped, but the body style continued to be marketed in an unnamed base trim that was essentially the same as the VL. The 2.2 L OHV L4 was now converted to the SFI version found in the Corsica, which delivered an output of 120 horsepower. Additional changes included a slightly redesigned climate control interface and the power locking system being again redesigned. The doors would still lock automatically when put into gear, but would also unlock automatically when the ignition was switched off.

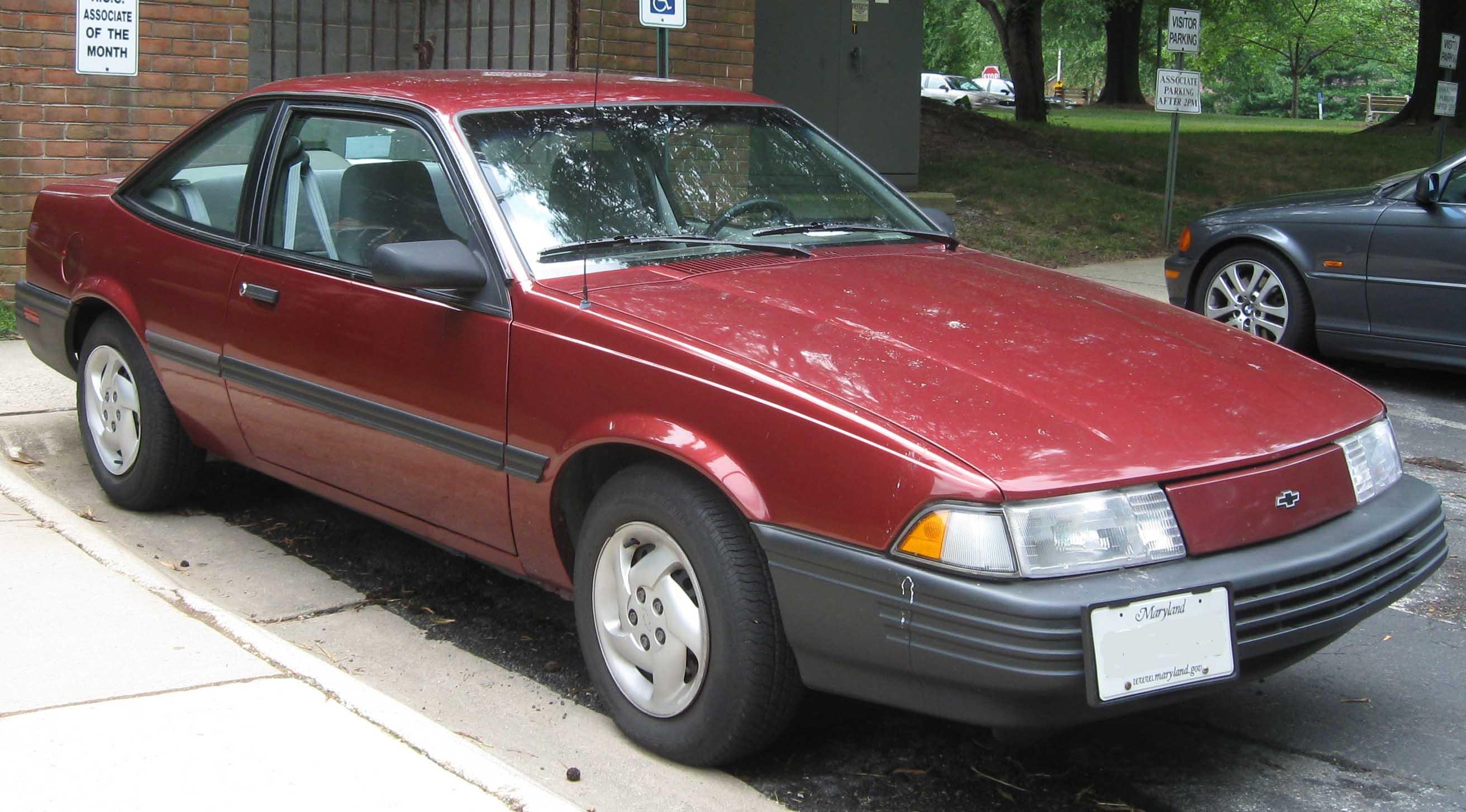
1991–1994 Cavalier VL coupe (facelift model)

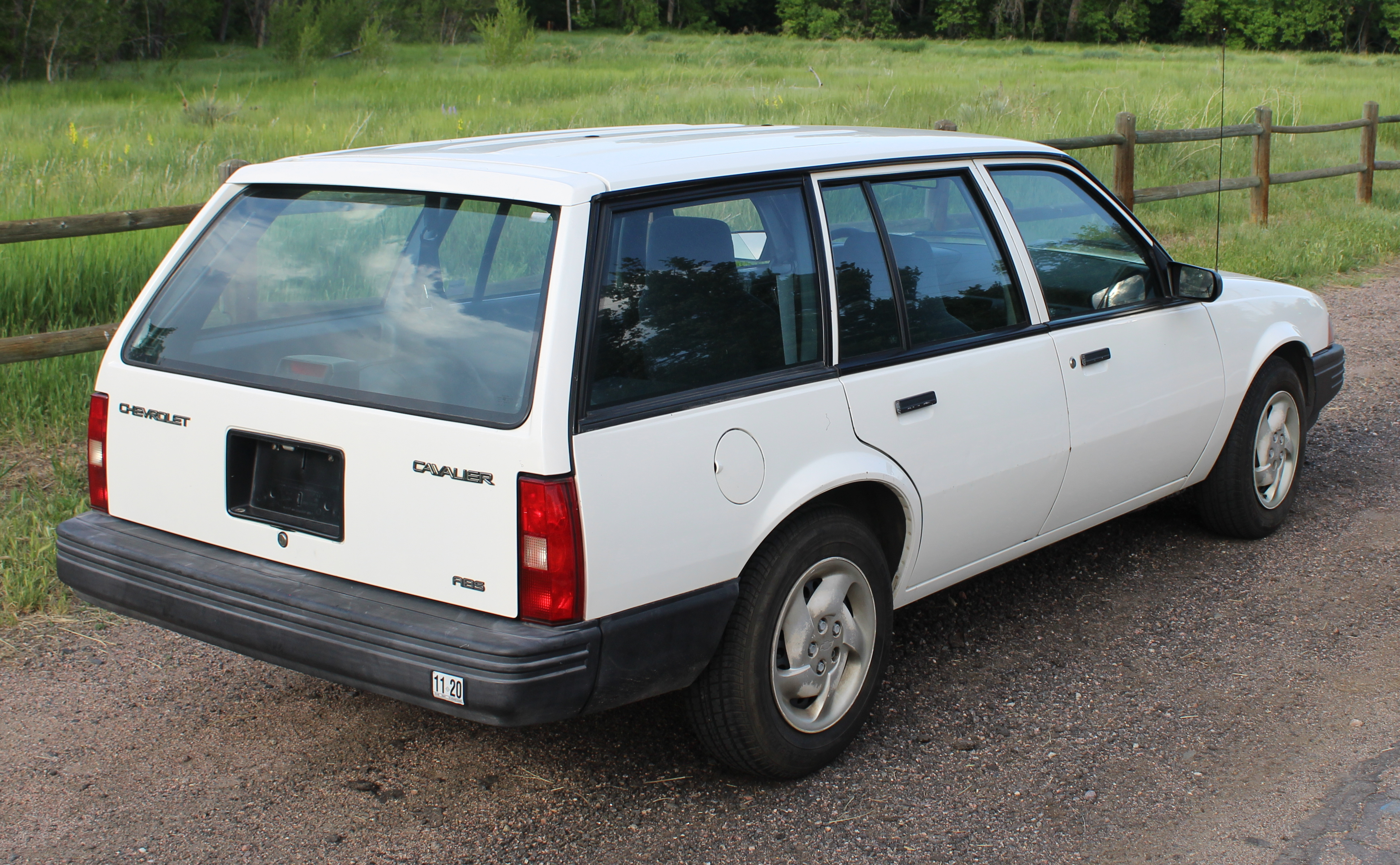
1991–1994 Cavalier wagon (facelift model)

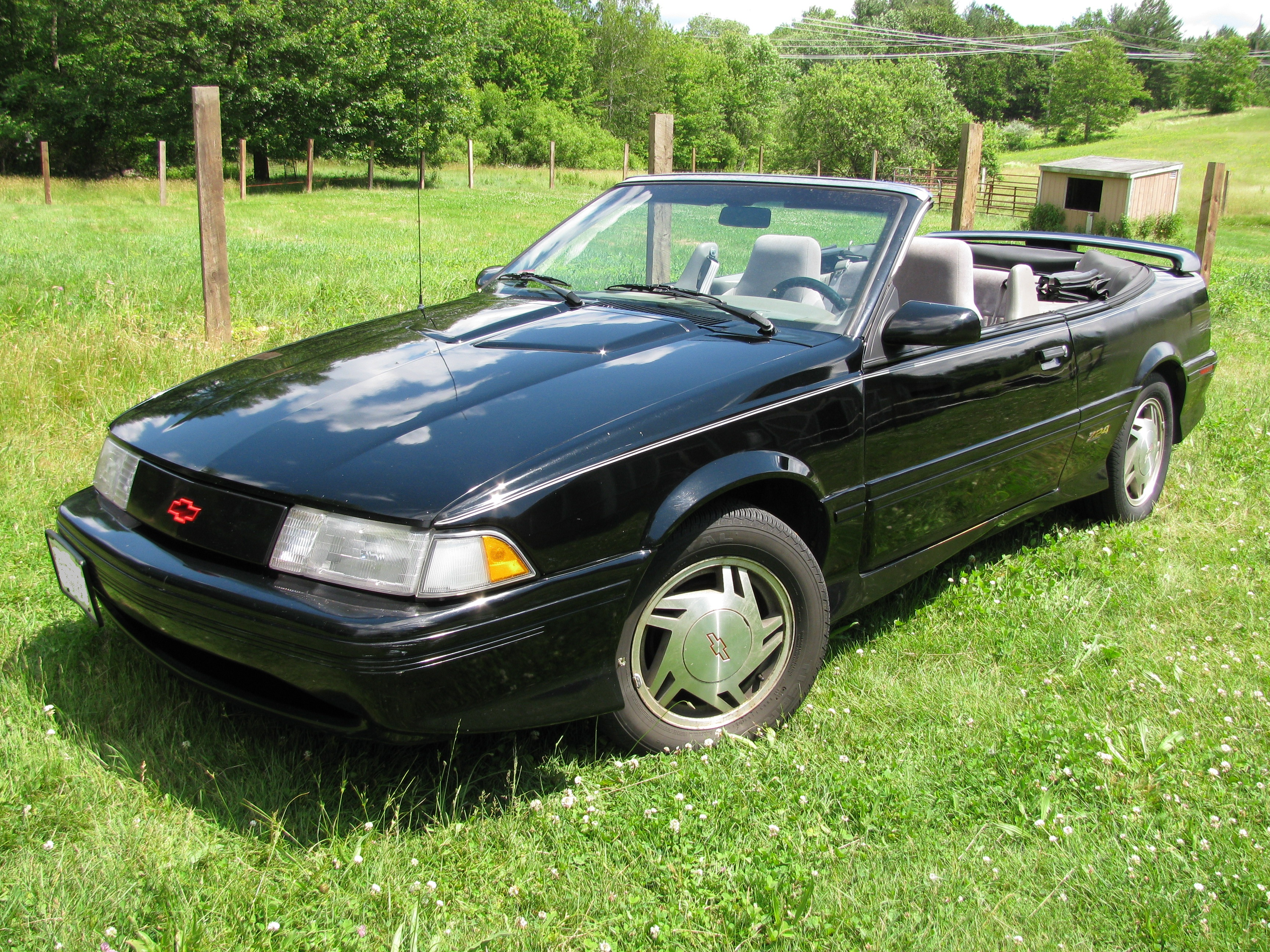
1994 Cavalier Z24 Convertible (facelift model)

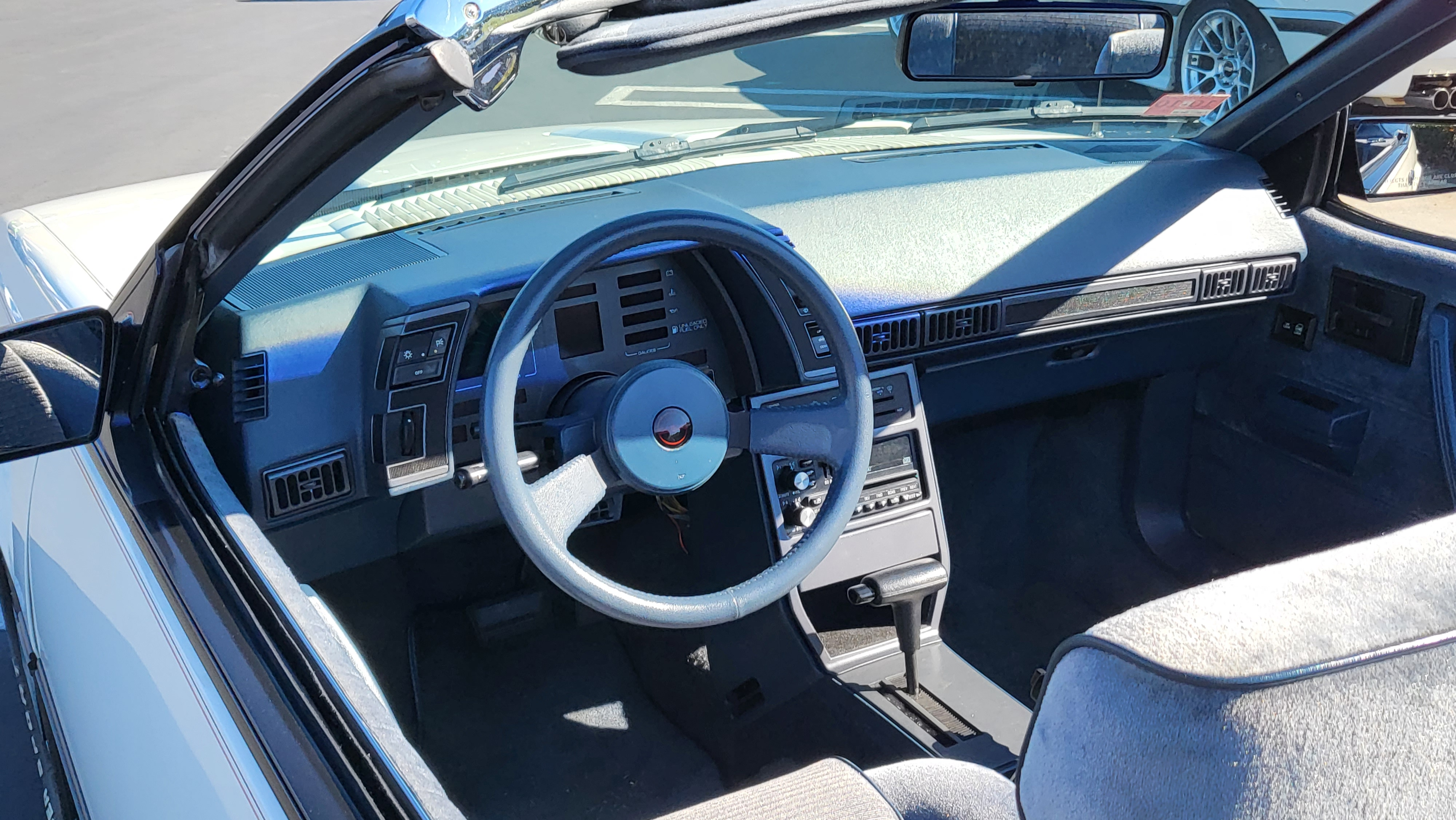
Digital dashboard in a Cavalier Z24 Convertible interior

Production figures
	Coupe	Sedan	Wagon	Convertible	Yearly total
1988	158,098	126,290	29,806	8,745	322,939
1989	227,433	107,569	28,549	13,075	376,626
1990	185,071	103,384	22,046	-	310,501
1991	171,759	125,713	23,493	5,882	326,847
1992	126,117	70,786	19,685	9,045	225,633
1993	127,229	96,545	19,207	8,609	251,590
1994	147,528	98,966	18,149	7,932	272,575
Total	1,143,235	729,253	160,935	53,288	2,086,711

=== Mexico ===
The Chevrolet Cavalier was introduced in Mexico for the 1990 model year to replace the Chevrolet Celebrity, which had been the entry point to the Mexican GM lineup until then. The initial offering consisted only of a 4-door sedan with a 2.8 L MPFI V6 with a 5-speed manual gearbox, or a 3-speed automatic as an option.

For 1991, it received the same redesign as in the United States, and was now also offered as a coupé. The coupé Cavalier Z24 was also introduced in Mexico with a 3.1 L V6, with both manual or automatic transmissions.

For 1993, the Mexican Cavalier adopted the aesthetics from the Pontiac Sunbird. For 1993 and 1994, the Cavaliers sold there featured Sunbird body panels as opposed to US-spec Cavalier panels, and the Mexican Cavalier Z24 took on the appearance of the Pontiac Sunbird GT sold in the United States. No wagons and convertibles were offered in Mexico.

== Third generation (1995–2005) ==
Third generation
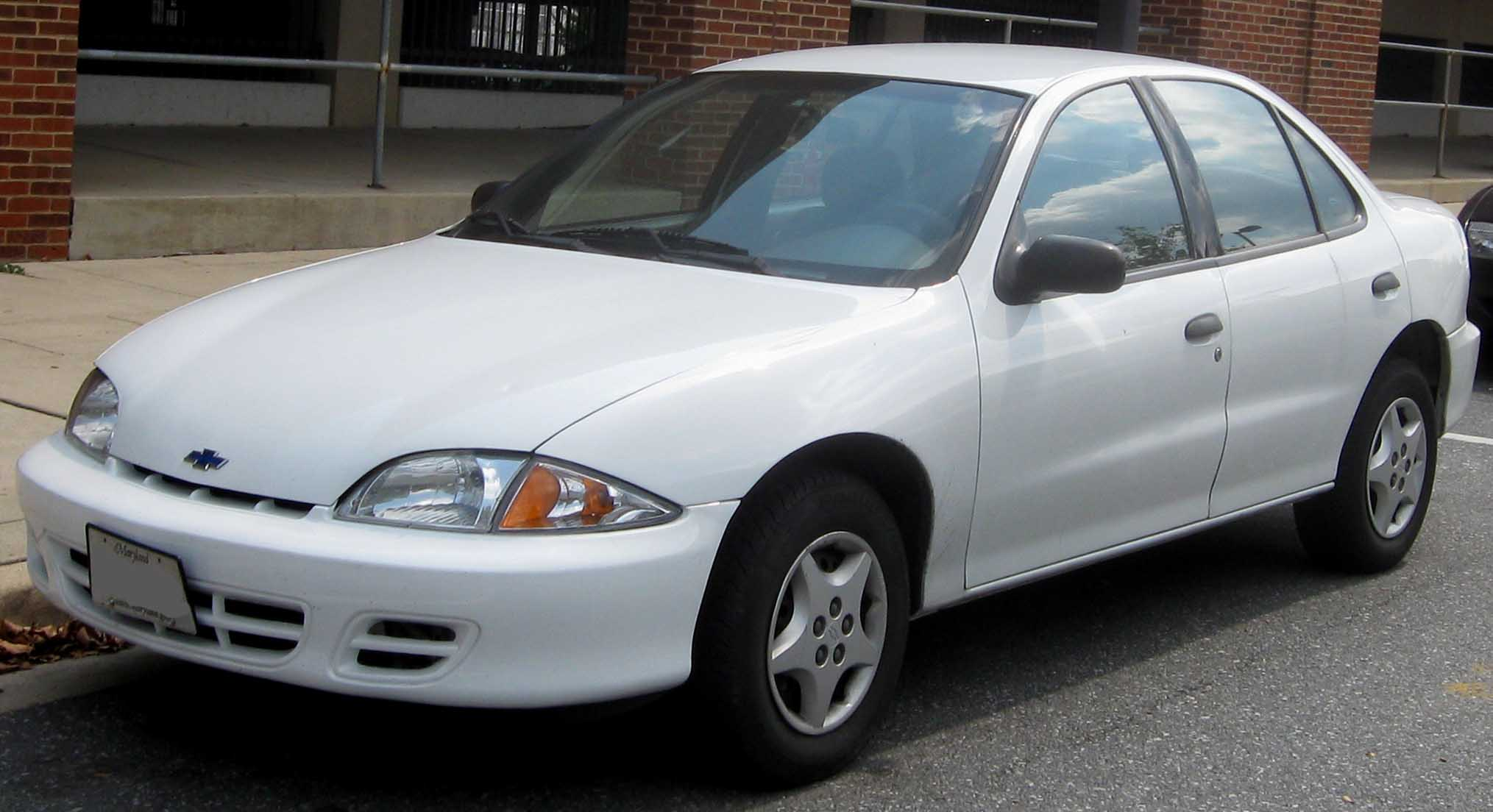
- 2000–2002 Cavalier sedan

Overview
- Also called: Toyota Cavalier (Japan)
- Production: August 1994–October 2005
- Model years: 1995–2005
- Assembly: Lordstown, Ohio, United States (Lordstown Assembly: 1995–2005); Lansing, Michigan, United States (Lansing Car Assembly: 1995–1998 coupe); Lansing, Michigan, United States (Lansing Craft Centre: 1995–2000 convertible); Ramos Arizpe, Coahuila, Mexico (Ramos Arizpe Assembly: 1995–2004); Valencia, Carabobo, Venezuela
- Designer: Chuck Jordan (1991)

Body and chassis
- Body style: 2-door convertible 2-door coupe 4-door sedan
- Platform: General Motors J platform (Series 1J)
- Related: Pontiac Sunfire

Powertrain
- Engine: 2,189 cc (133.6 cu in) LN2 OHV I4; 2,198 cc (134.1 cu in) L61/L42 DOHC I4; 2,260 cc (137.9 cu in) LD2 DOHC I4; 2,392 cc (146.0 cu in) LD9 DOHC I4
- Transmission: 3-speed 3T40 automatic 4-speed 4T40-E automatic 5-speed Getrag F23 manual 5-speed Getrag 282 manual 5-speed Isuzu manual

Dimensions
- Wheelbase: 104.1 in (2,644 mm)
- Length: 1995–97: 180.3 in (4,580 mm); 1998–2002: 180.7 in (4,590 mm); 2003–05: 180.9 in (4,595 mm)
- Width: 2-Door: 68.7 in (1,745 mm); 4-Door: 67.9 in (1,725 mm)
- Height: 1995–97 Coupe: 53.2 in (1,351 mm); 1995–97 Sedan: 54.8 in (1,392 mm); 1995–97 Convertible: 53.9 in (1,369 mm); 1998–2005 Coupe: 53.0 in (1,346 mm); 1998–99 Convertible: 54.1 in (1,374 mm); 1998–2005 Sedan: 54.7 in (1,389 mm); 2000–02 Convertible: 53.7 in (1,364 mm)
- Curb weight: 2,562–2,900 lb (1,162–1,315 kg)

Chronology
- Successor: Chevrolet Cobalt (For United States and Canada); Chevrolet Optra (For Mexico)

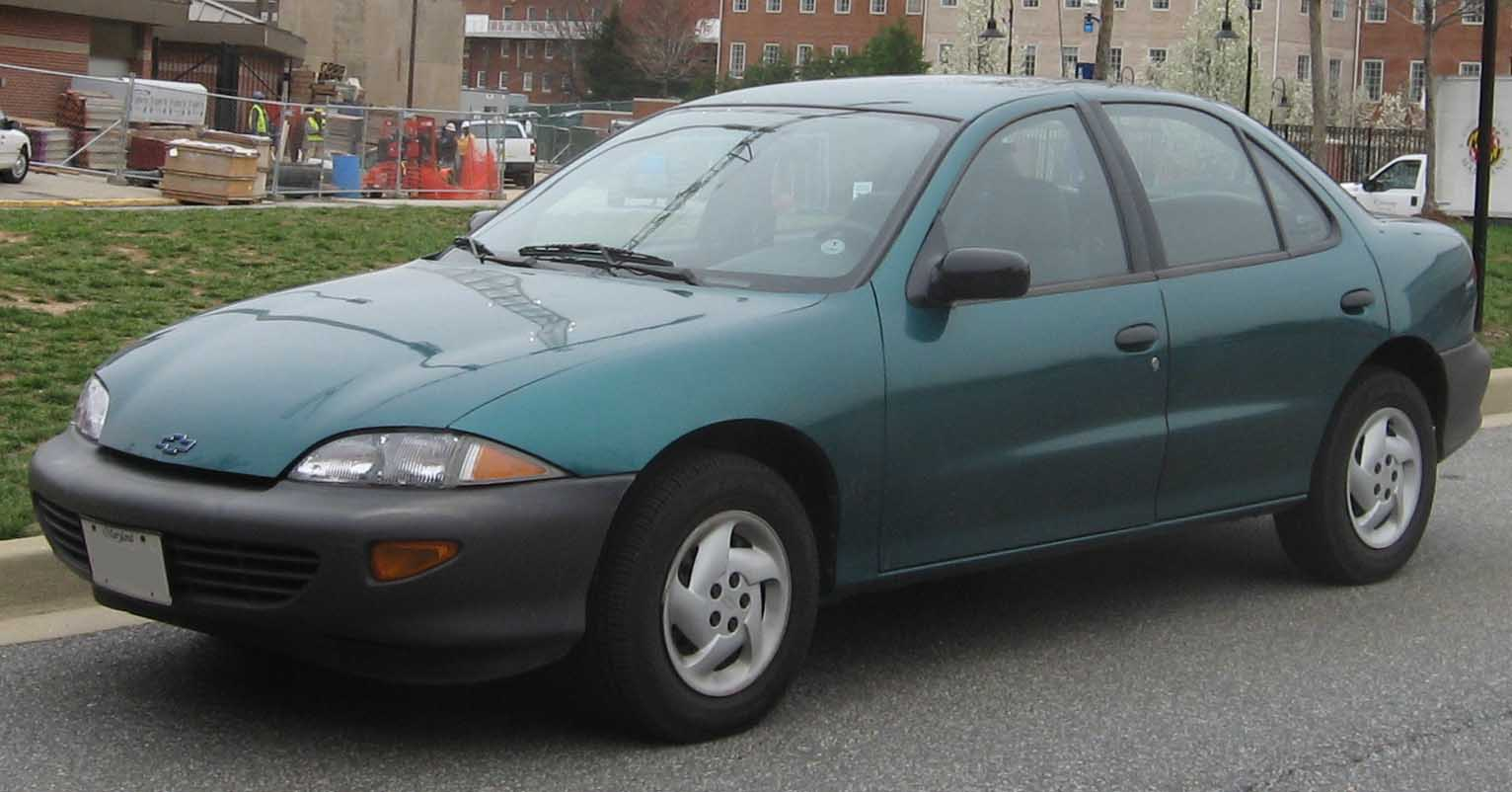
1995–1999 Chevrolet Cavalier sedan

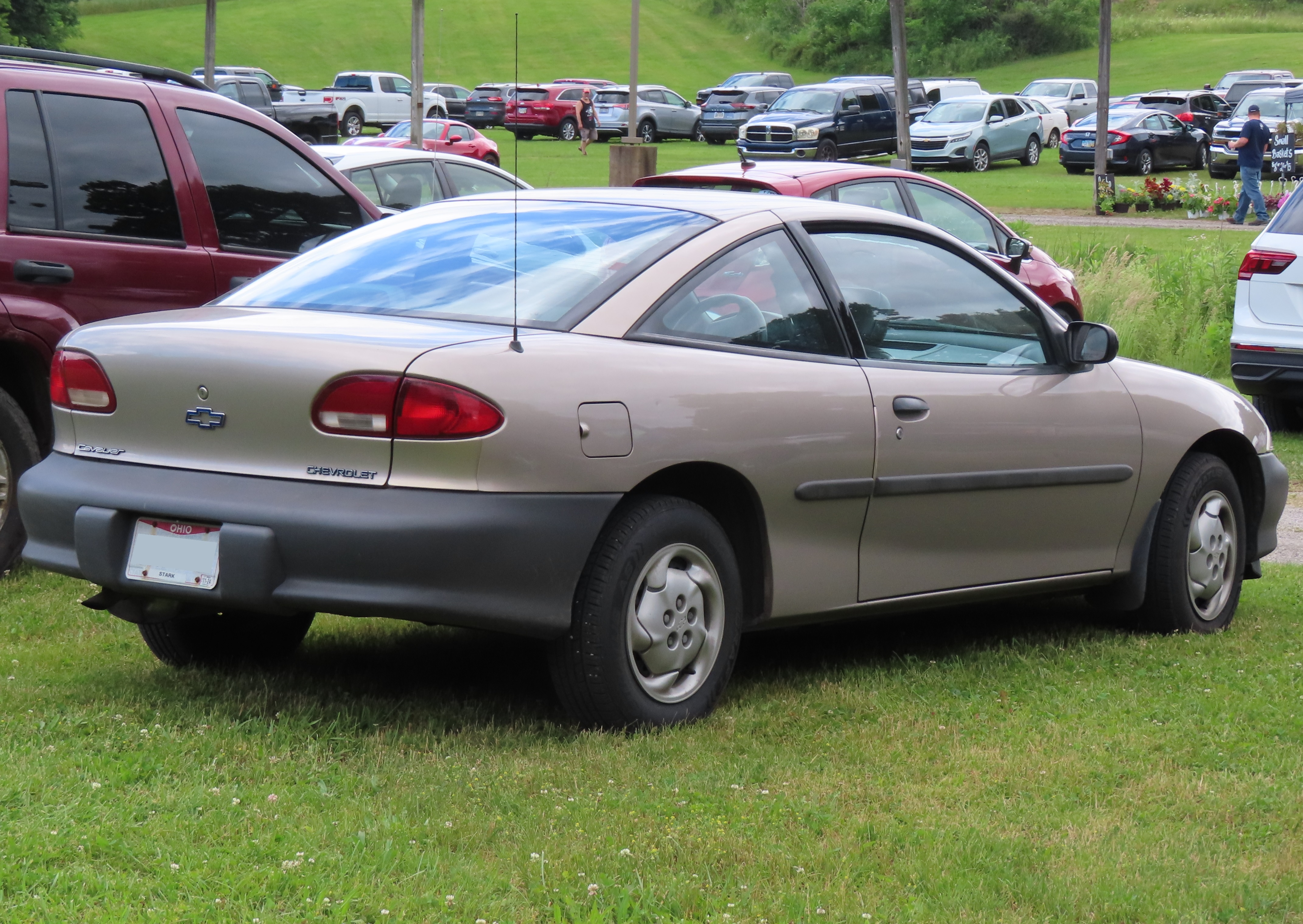
1996 Chevrolet Cavalier coupe, rear view

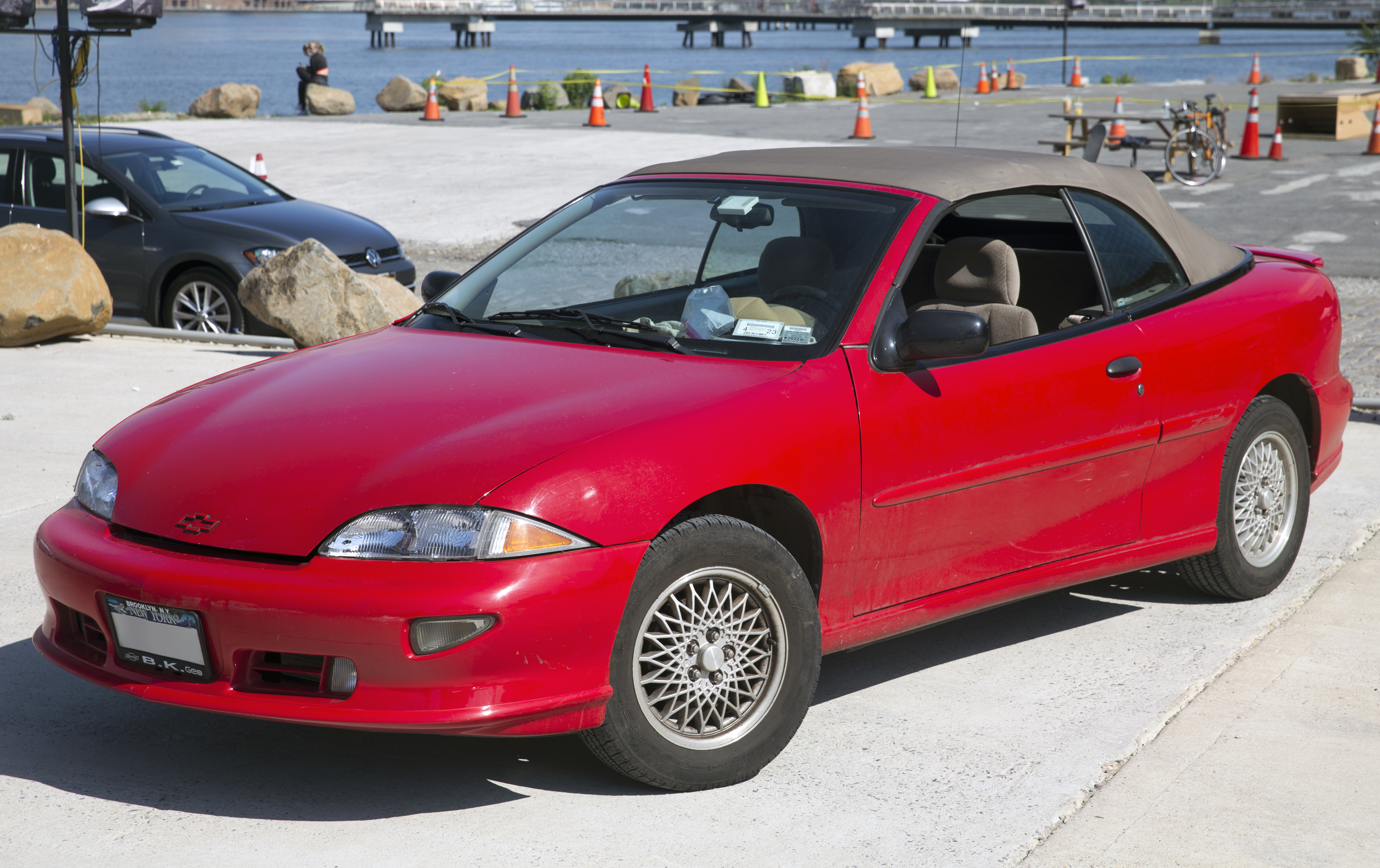
1998–1999 Chevrolet Cavalier Z24 convertible

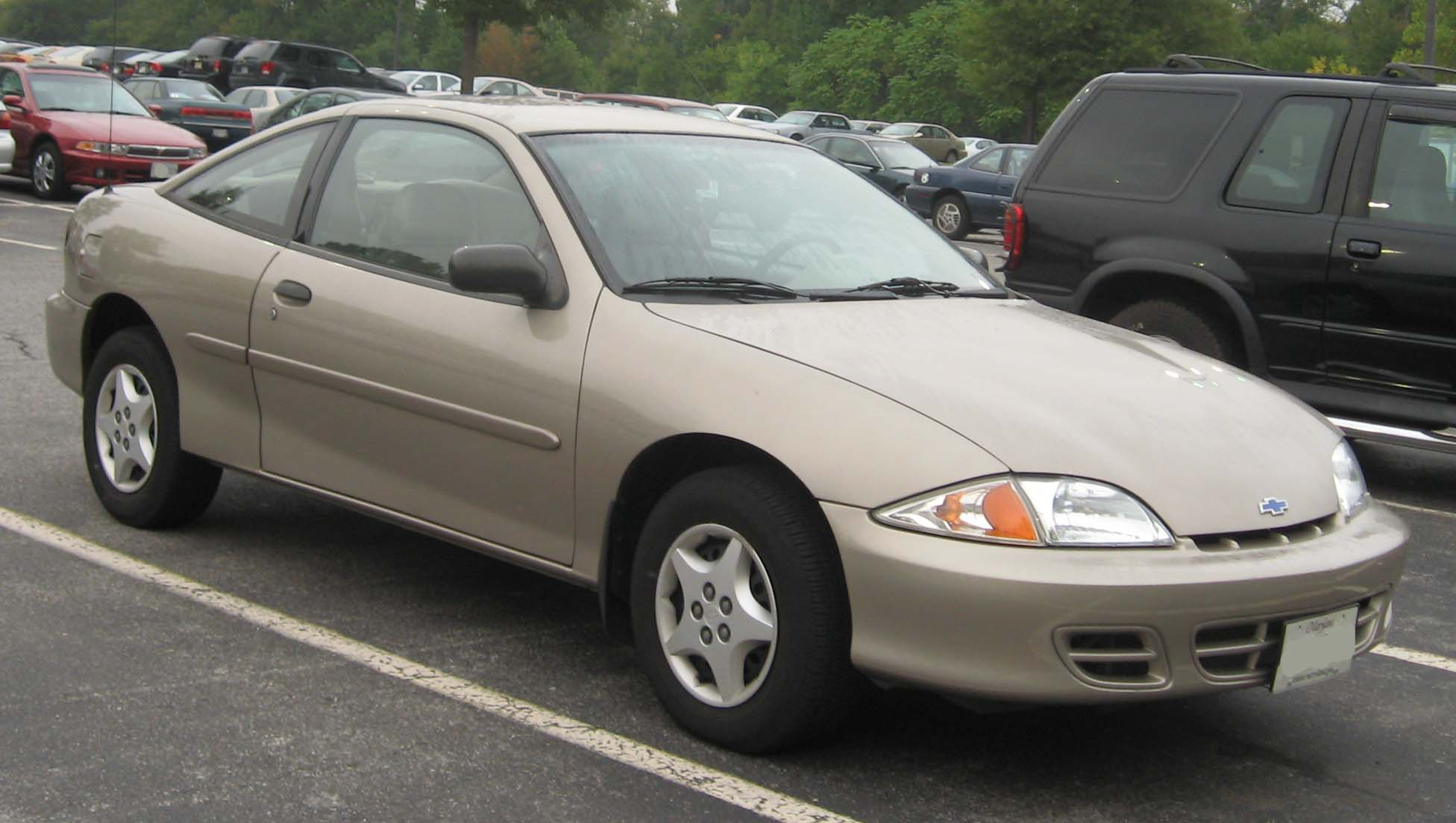
2000–2002 Chevrolet Cavalier coupe

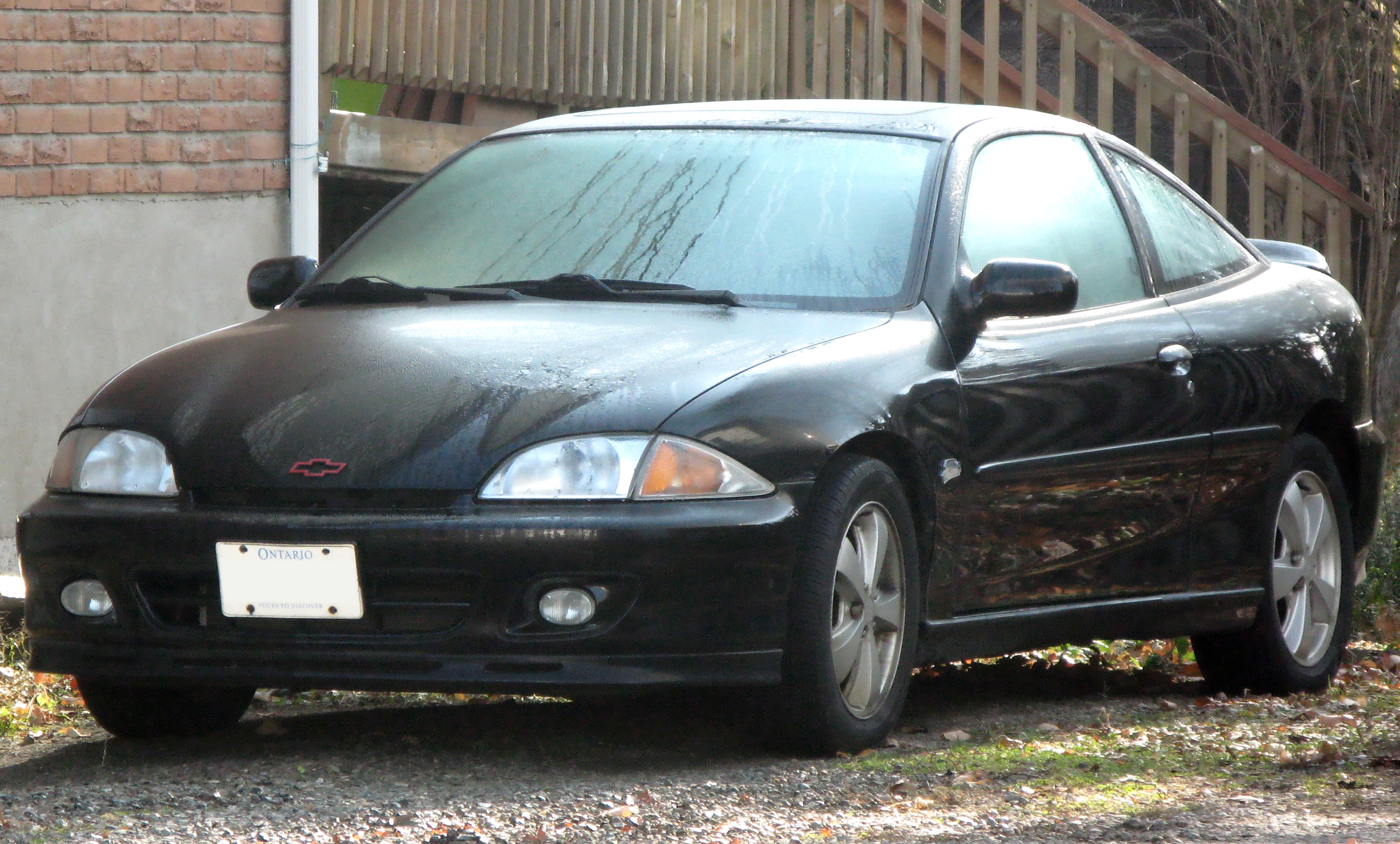
2000–2002 Chevrolet Cavalier Z24 coupe

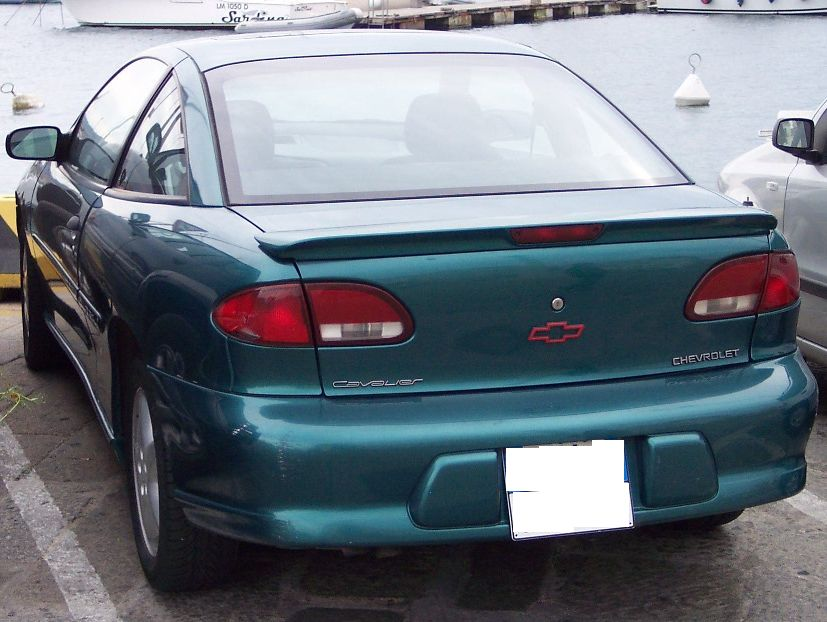
1995–1999 Chevrolet Cavalier Z24 coupe

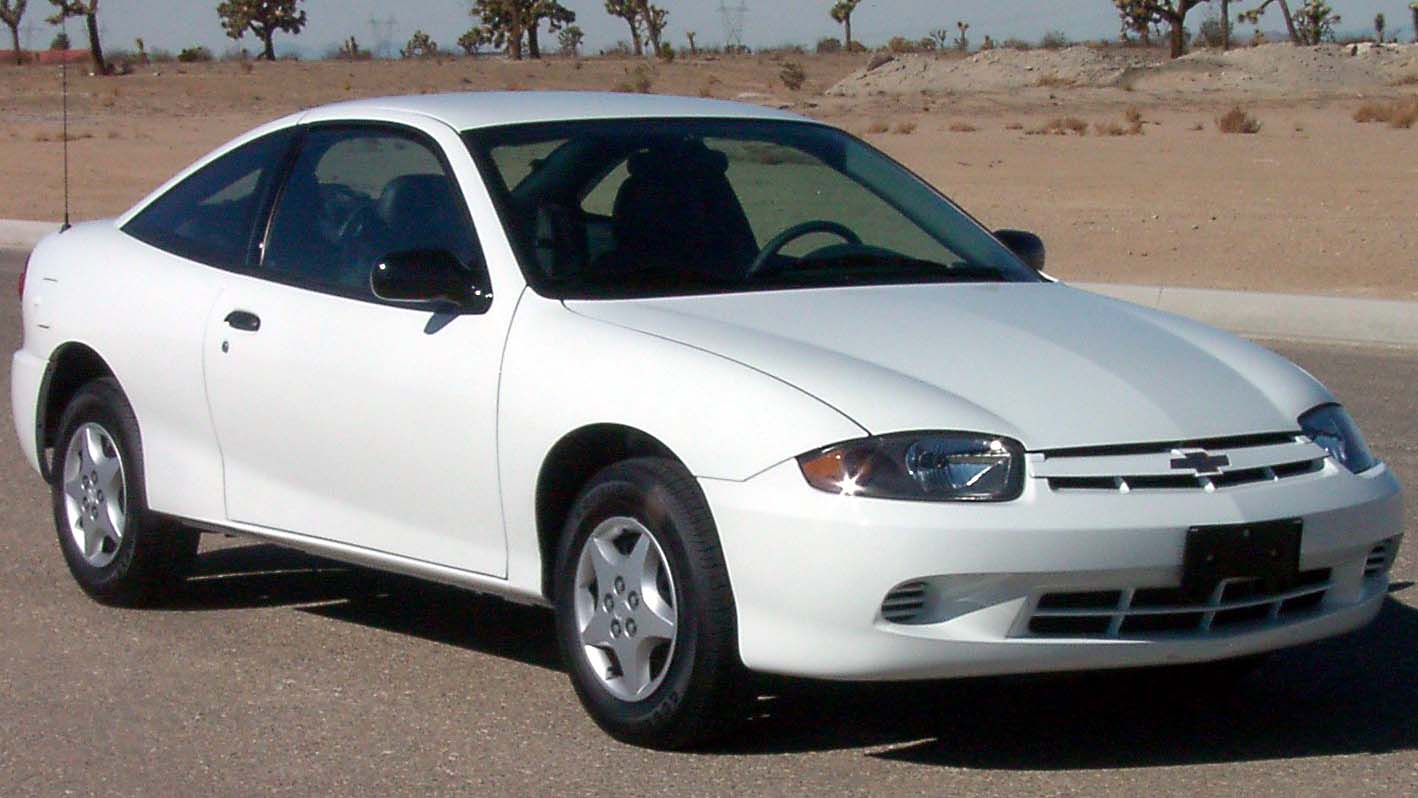
2003-2005 Chevrolet Cavalier coupe

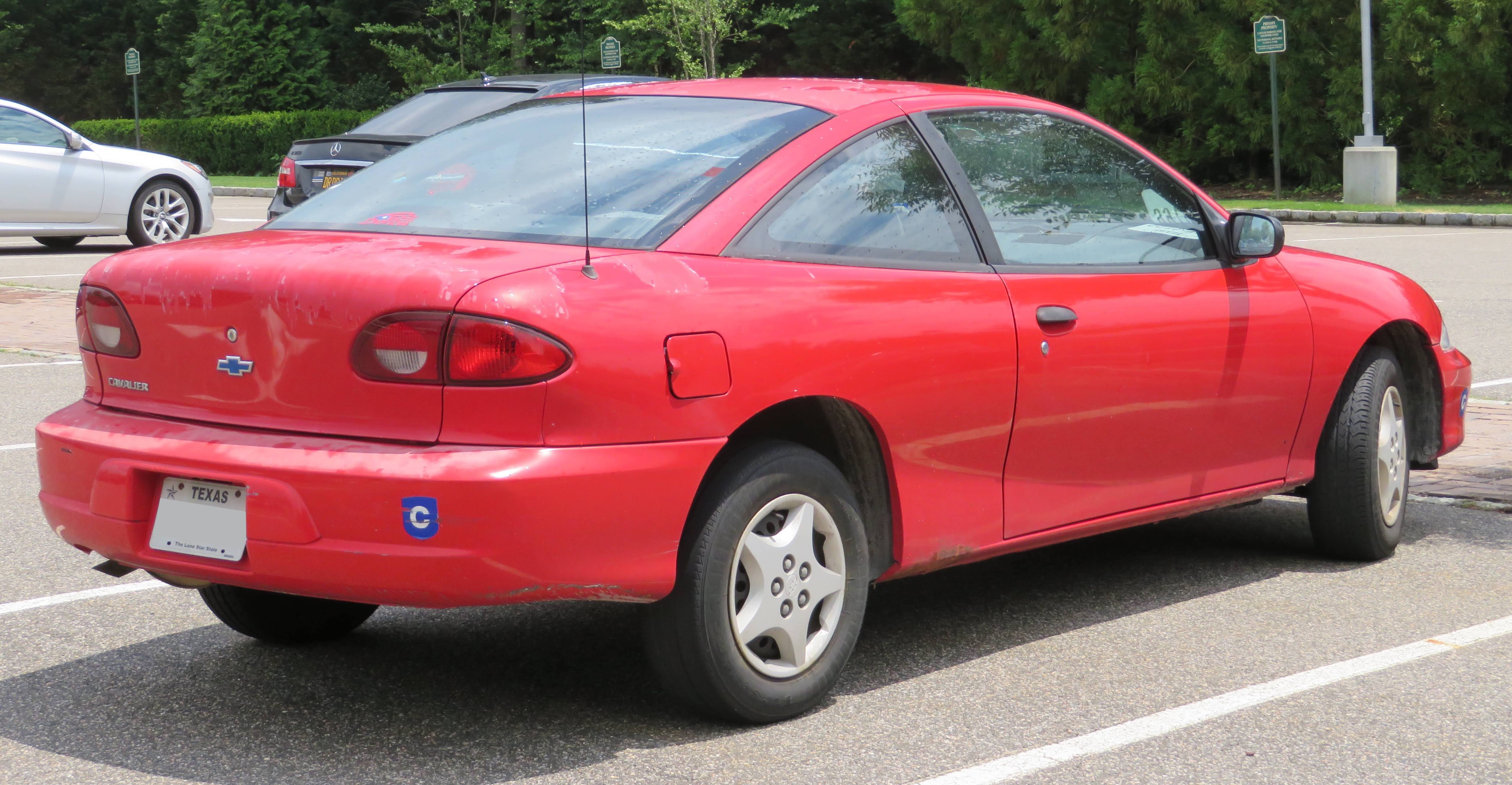
2000–2002 Chevrolet Cavalier coupe, rear view

The Cavalier received its first total redesign for 1995, with expanded dimensions and more aerodynamic styling, incorporating minor design cues from the fourth-generation Camaro. However, some of the basic styling cues remained, such as the bumper-integrated grille and the coupes' dipped beltline. Coupe, sedan, and convertible options were offered, but the wagon model was discontinued and later replaced with the Chevrolet HHR in 2005. The car now had the available option of 15 and 16-inch wheels. By 1997, the Cavalier became the best-selling car within the entire GM lineup.

For the third generation, powertrain options were limited to inline-four engines. The option for a V6 engine, which had been available in the first and second generations, was dropped and replaced by a new four-cylinder of similar power output. Base and RS models still retained the 2.2-liter pushrod four-cylinder engine (2.2 L OHV) of the previous models, which was primarily mated to a 3-speed automatic, but was available with 5-speed manual in the two-door models, particularly the RS models. For 1996, a new 4-speed automatic became available in any trim; this had originally been intended to be introduced along with the redesign, but General Motors' cash shortage delayed it. The Z24 and LS convertible used the 2.3 L LD2 Quad 4 engine in 1995, but they received a new engine in 1996, the 2.4 liter DOHC LD9. This engine could also be special ordered on a 4-door LS model. This engine produced 150 hp (112 kW) and 155 lb⋅ft (210 N⋅m) of torque and was used until 2002. The car was also available with a CNG bi-fuel system for fleet customers from 1998 to 2004.

In 2000, the Cavalier received a minor facelift, with bigger headlights and an improved grille, the removal of the "CHEVROLET" lettering at the trunklid, and the addition of a new "CAVALIER" badge along with new "five spoke" hubcaps. The 2.4-liter engine came mated standard with the Getrag F23 5-speed manual transmission on the Z24 models, or with the optional 4-speed automatic on both the Z24 and the LS models. The Z24 only came in 2-door coupe models until 2001, and featured a sport-tuned suspension, 16-inch tires, alloy wheels and improved interior electronics. Few aesthetic changes were made from the other models, save for a ground effects kit and taller rear spoiler. A 4-door Z24 Sedan debuted in 2002, featuring the same mechanics while having a less sporty body. The Z24 trim also received several other upgrades, including a wider front sway bar and FE2 Sports Suspension for better handling characteristics, and a less aggressive ABS anti-lock braking system.

In 2002, the 3-speed automatic was dropped from the base models equipped with the 2.2, and the 4-speed automatic became the main offering across the entire lineup, with 5-speed still available in the two-door cars. The RS was also replaced by the LS Sport line, which featured the new Ecotec L61 motors with 140 hp (104 kW) and 150 lb⋅ft (203 N⋅m) torque. These engines improved fuel economy, featuring the same displacement as the GM 122 Pushrod Engine (2.2 L OHV) while maintaining most of the power of the older LD9 motors. The new Ecotec motors replaced the GM 122 Pushrod Engine in base models in 2003, and became the sole engine choice in the entire Cavalier lineup until 2005, when the Cavalier was replaced by the Chevrolet Cobalt.

A GM Eaton M45 Supercharger kit was also offered for the Z24 trim as well. The supercharger kit was developed and tested by General Motors and could only be installed at a GM dealer. This upgrade increased performance considerably due to a pressure of 4.7 PSI, which in turn added approximately 40 hp (30 kW) and 40 lb⋅ft (54 N⋅m) of torque increase; raising the Z24's ratings to approximately 190 hp (142 kW) and 195 lb⋅ft (264 N⋅m) of torque.

=== Facelifts ===
The third-generation Cavalier had two facelifts. The first came during the 2000 model year with minor changes, including new front and rear bumper fascias, which included revised headlamps and taillamps. There was a more extensive refresh for the 2003 model year, which included a complete new front end design, revised taillamps with a full-width rear reflector, a new rear spoiler and rear bumper fascia.

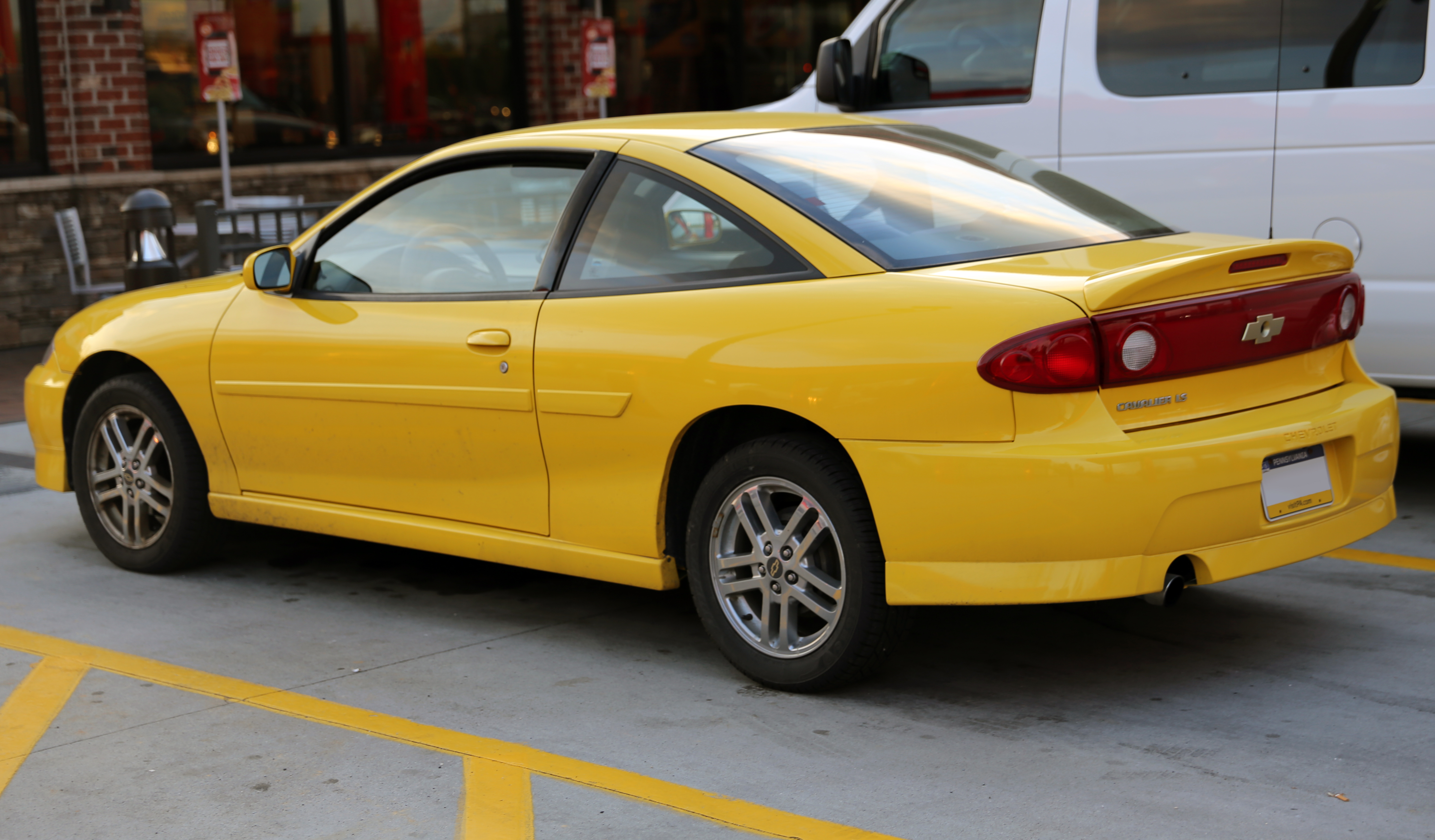
2003–2005 Chevrolet Cavalier LS Sport coupe, rear view

Production figures
Year	Coupe	Sedan	Convertible	Yearly total
1995	131,866	73,680	7,230	212,766
1996	205,218	65,912	5,992	277,122
1997	130,777	68,147	4,237	203,161
1998	181,707	71,783	2,611	256,101
1999	200,067	72,035	20	272,122
2000	149,871	86,930	2	236,803
2001	139,375	93,923	-	233,298
2002	130,294	107,931	-	238,225
2003	137,500	119,004	-	256,550
2004	92,612	103,663	-	195,275
2005	8,958	10,002	-	18,960
2006	159	296	-	355
2007	15	42	-	57

=== Safety ===
The third-generation Cavalier earned several low scores in crash tests by the Insurance Institute for Highway Safety (IIHS) and National Highway Traffic Safety Administration (NHTSA). IIHS fatality risks statistics rated the Cavalier among the "highest rates of driver deaths", with 150 (four-door) to 171 (two-door) driver deaths per million registered vehicle years. Average for the Cavalier class (small) was 103 (four-door) to 134 (two-door) driver deaths per million registered vehicle years.

The IIHS gave the 1995-2005 Cavalier a "poor" overall score in their frontal offset collision test.

2005 National Highway Traffic Safety Administration (NHTSA) Crash Test Ratings (coupe):

- Frontal driver:
- Frontal passenger:
- Side driver: *safety concern*
- Side rear passenger:
- Rollover:

2002 National Highway Traffic Safety Administration (NHTSA) Crash Test Ratings (sedan):

- Frontal driver:
- Frontal passenger:
- Side driver: *safety concern*
- Side rear passenger:
- Rollover:

=== Toyota Cavalier ===
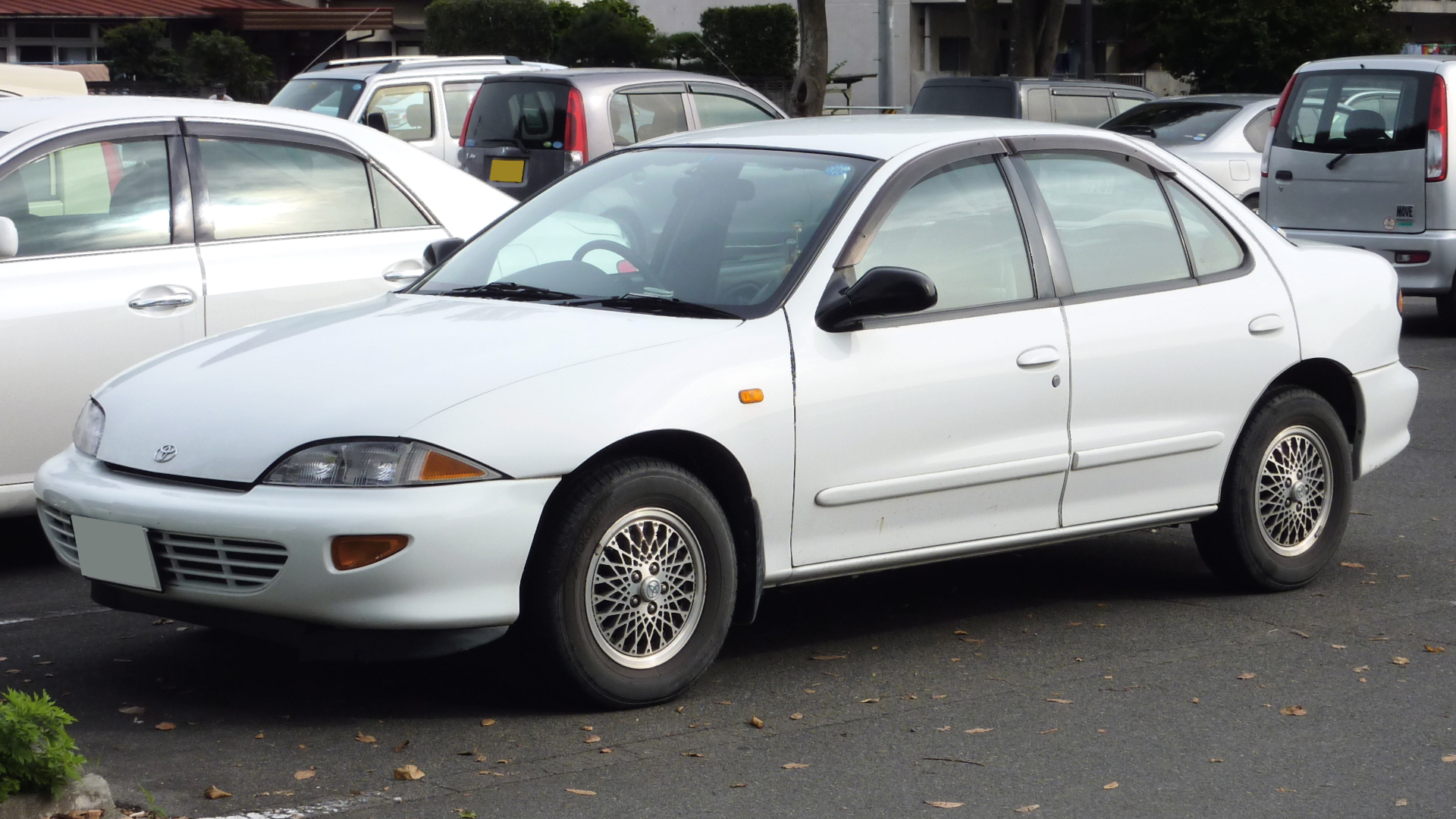
Toyota Cavalier sedan (Japan)

As part of a wider effort to avoid additional restrictions on exports to the US, the third generation model was briefly sold in Japan by Toyota under an agreement with GM, badged as the Toyota Cavalier.

Aside from being configured in right hand drive, the Toyota Cavalier also featured a leather-wrapped shift knob, steering wheel and park brake lever, wider front fenders, taillights with amber turn signals for Japanese regulations, power folding side mirrors, side turn signal repeaters on the front fenders, and carpeting on the inside of the trunk lid. Interior seats were often flecked with color, and the rear seat had a fold-down armrest. Vehicles produced from February to December 1998 were available with a leather interior equipped with an automatic transmission only.

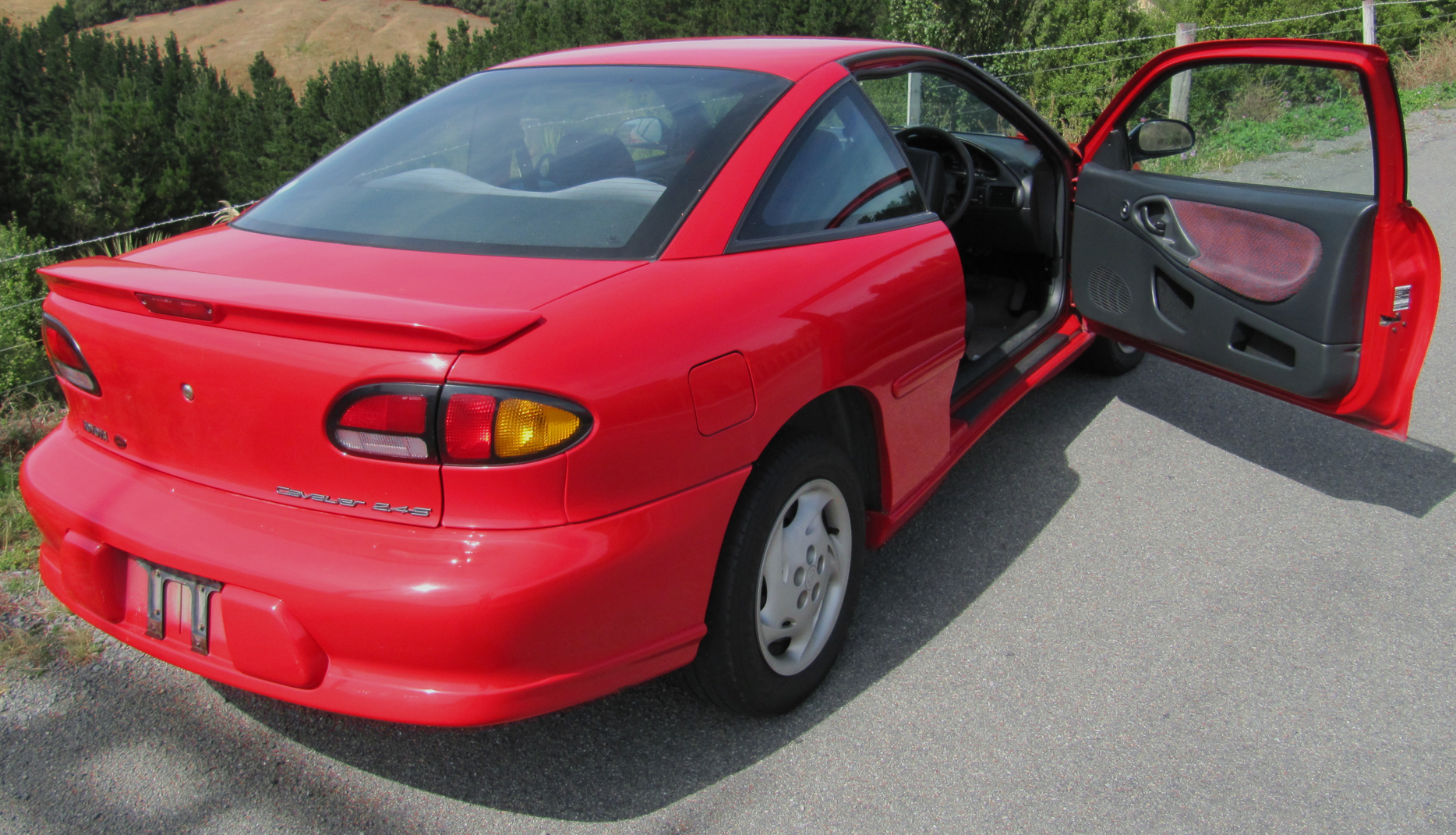
1998 Toyota Cavalier coupé (Japanese export model with taillights containing amber rear turn signals, right hand drive and flecked red-grey interior)

All models featured wheels borrowed from the Pontiac Sunfire. The Toyota Cavalier was available in 2.4G and 2.4Z trim levels. When Chevrolet-badged Cavaliers received a facelift for 2000, the Toyota Cavalier followed suit, with an updated center console, head-lights/hood/front bumper, taillights, and colors available. TRD made a body kit and rear wing for the Cavalier, available exclusively in Japan. The car was sold only at Toyota Store Japanese dealerships.

The Cavalier was not the only GM product sold in Japan; the Saturn S-series, also with right-hand-drive, was sold at Saturn dealerships (as well as some former Isuzu dealerships) from 1996 to 2003, and some Toyota Vista Stores also retailed Saturns.

The Cavalier was entirely produced by GM at Lordstown Assembly in Lordstown, Ohio, and sold from 1995 to 2000. 1996-2000 Toyota Cavaliers came equipped with the 2.4 L LD9 engine, while the 1995 model used the 2.3 L Quad 4. Due to the engine displacement and width dimensions (1,740 mm (69 in) for the coupe, 1,735 mm (68 in) for the sedan) exceeding Japanese government regulations concerning exterior dimensions and maximum engine displacement, it was not considered a "compact", and it was sold as a "normal-class car" like the Toyota Mark II and Nissan Skyline. Prices for the coupe started at 2 million yen for the coupe, and 1.81 million yen for the sedan. The final Toyota Cavalier was imported in 2000.

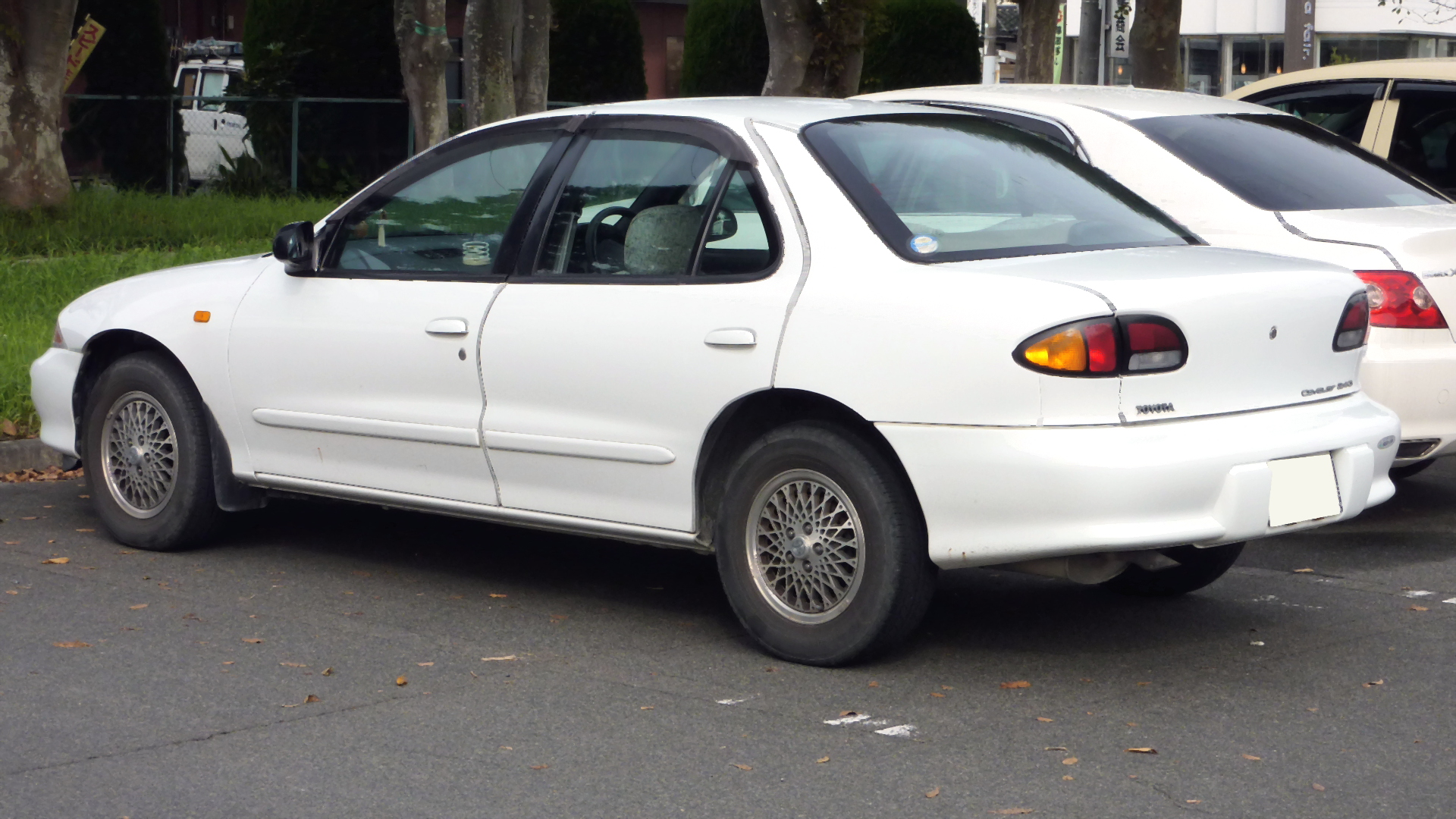
Toyota Cavalier with side turn signal repeaters and taillights with amber turn signals

The introduction of the Toyota Cavalier was not the first time the car had been sold in Japan. Yanase, a Japanese retail dealership that started importing European and North American vehicles soon after the end of World War II, sold various GM products including the Cavalier. When the decision was made to sell the Cavalier as a Toyota, this disrupted operations at Yanase. When the Toyota Cavalier was cancelled, Yanase continued to sell Chevrolet and other GM products. Yanase also provides complete maintenance services for all vehicles sold.

Due to higher than typically average vehicle inspection costs, a fair number of these vehicles were exported out of Japan as Japanese used cars, most notably to Australia and New Zealand. Production of the Toyota Cavalier ceased in June 2000. Despite Toyota making considerable efforts to sell the Cavalier on the domestic market, the Japanese public perceived the quality of workmanship to not be up to the standard typically expected of locally built cars. The car was also introduced while Japan was in a recession following the 1991 collapse of the Japanese asset price bubble or "bubble economy".

=== Motorsport ===
Kraft, a semi-factory supported Toyota team that competed in the All Japan Grand Touring Car Championship, raced a Toyota Cavalier in the GT300 class for the 1997 and 1998 seasons. The Cavalier GT300 car retained its front-wheel drive layout, but was fitted with Bomex racing body and aerodynamic packages, along with a 3S-GTE engine from a SW20 MR2 Turbo that was restricted to meet GT300's 300 horsepower limit.

Kraft debuted the Cavalier in the fourth round of the 1997 season as their second entry, accompanying the number 6 Toyota MR2 (W20) that was racing full-time that year. Minoru Tanaka was signed as one of its drivers, along with Kumi Sato, one of the only seven female racing drivers in both JGTC and Super GT. The Cavalier only finished 16th in its debut at Fuji Speedway, but Tanaka and Sato brought home a fourth-place finish in the next round at Mine Circuit. The results at Mine were enough for Tanaka and Sato to finish 17th in the standings. Sato was retained for the 1998 season, and was joined by Masaoki Nagashima in the first round, Junko Mihara in the second round, and Akira Watanabe for the remainder of the year. Sato and Watanabe scored three points finishes and finished 24th in that year's championship. 1998 was to be the Cavalier's final year in the JGTC, as Kraft decided to replace it with a spaceframe Toyota AE86 for the 1999 season.

== Production ==
Most Cavaliers were built at Lordstown Assembly, although they were also produced at South Gate Assembly (1982 model year only), Lansing Car Assembly (1995-1998 coupes), Lansing Craft Centre (1995-2000 convertibles), Janesville Assembly, Ramos Arizpe Assembly and Leeds Assembly. The Cavalier was discontinued in 2005.

== Fourth generation (2016) ==
Fourth generation
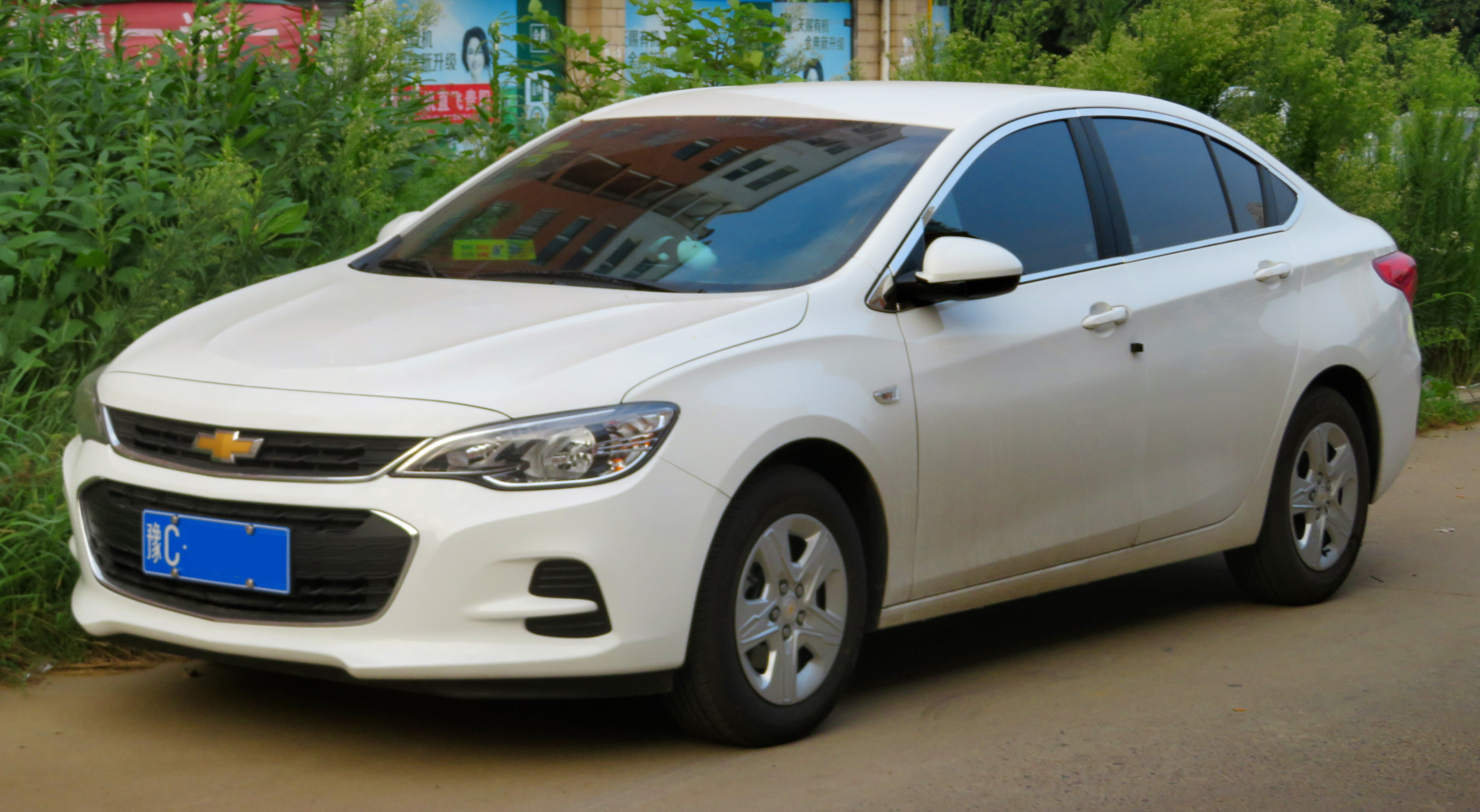
- Chevrolet Cavalier sedan (China)

Overview
- Production: 2016–2021
- Assembly: China: Wuhan, Hubei (SAIC-GM)

Body and chassis
- Body style: 4-door sedan
- Layout: Front-engine, front-wheel-drive
- Platform: Delta II platform

Powertrain
- Engine: 1.5 L S-TEC III I4
- Transmission: 5-speed manual 6-speed automatic

Dimensions
- Wheelbase: 2,600 mm (102.4 in)
- Length: 4,544 mm (178.9 in)
- Width: 1,779 mm (70.0 in)
- Height: 1,467 mm (57.8 in)

Chronology
- Predecessor: Chevrolet Sonic (Mexico)
- Successor: Chevrolet Monza/Cavalier

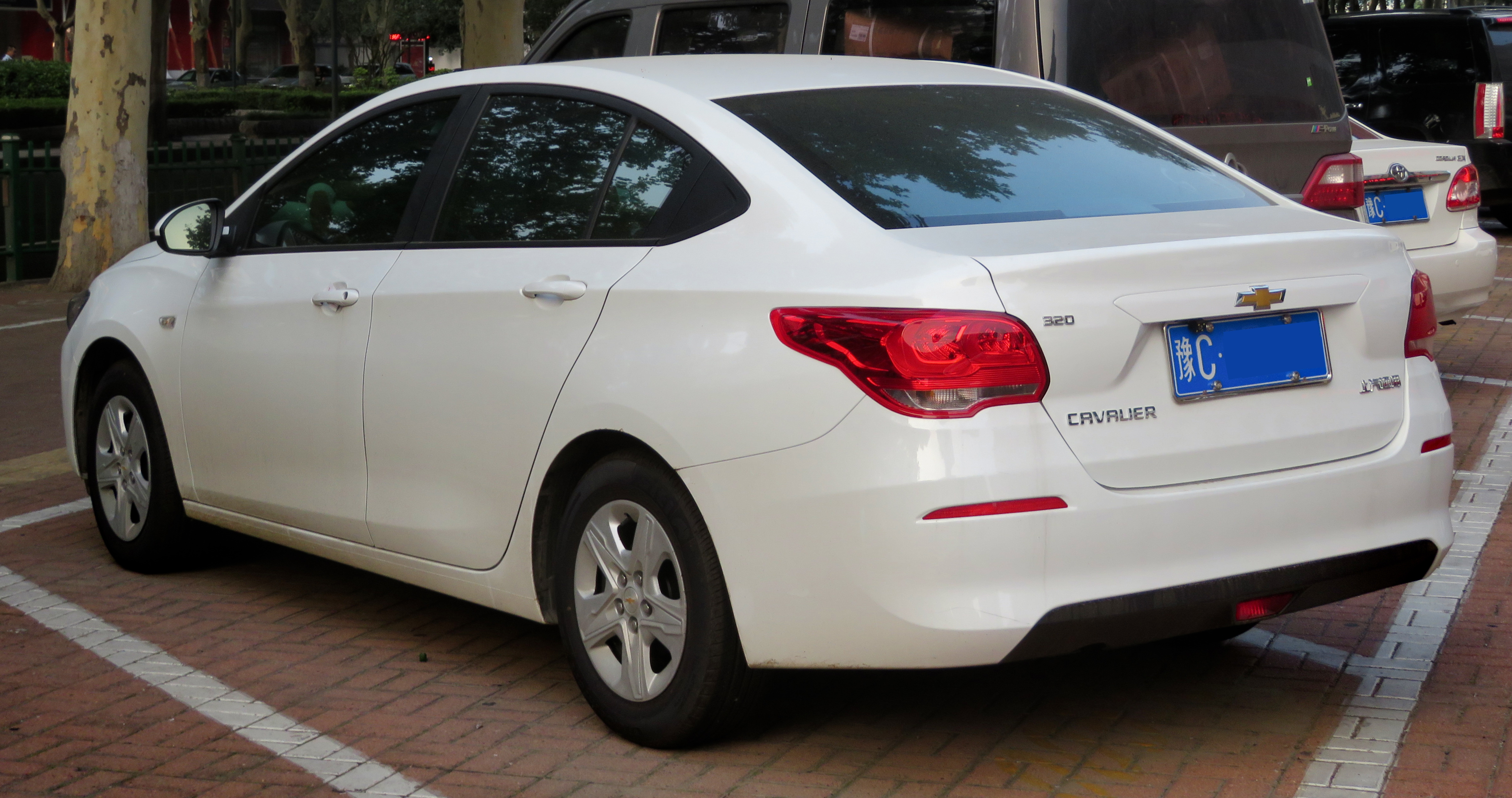
Chevrolet Cavalier

Chevrolet reintroduced the Cavalier name on a new compact sedan for the Chinese market, positioned below the Cruze, with the Chinese model name being Kewozi (科沃兹). The Cavalier was introduced at the 2016 Chengdu Auto Show on September 2, 2016. It uses the same Delta II platform as the first-generation Cruze, and the 1.5-liter four-cylinder engine that powers many compact GM models in China, including the Chevrolet Sail. The new Cavalier was priced between the smaller Sail and the more modern second-generation Cruze. Deliveries started in September, with 11,000 units reportedly sold in its first month, but there were indications that the Cavalier was cannibalizing sales of the similarly priced first-generation Cruze, which remained available. Starting in 2018, this Cavalier went on sale in Mexico, replacing the Chevrolet Sonic. There, the 1.5 L engine produces 107 hp (80 kW) and 104 lb⋅ft (141 N⋅m).

The Mexico-spec Cavalier was updated for 2020, with three new paint colors, a new wheel design, and minor changes to the interior for the LT trim line. These included a seven-inch screen with MyLink and smartphone integration for Apple CarPlay. A number of previously optional features also became standard, including four airbags, stability control, and disc brakes with ABS on all four wheels. The 2020 Cavalier went on sale on September 23, 2019. In 2019, the car was discontinued in the Chinese domestic market after being replaced by the Chevrolet Monza (科鲁泽), although it continued to be built for export. The 科沃兹 (Kewozi) name is now used on the Chevrolet Onix, positioned below the Monza.

== Fifth generation (2021) ==
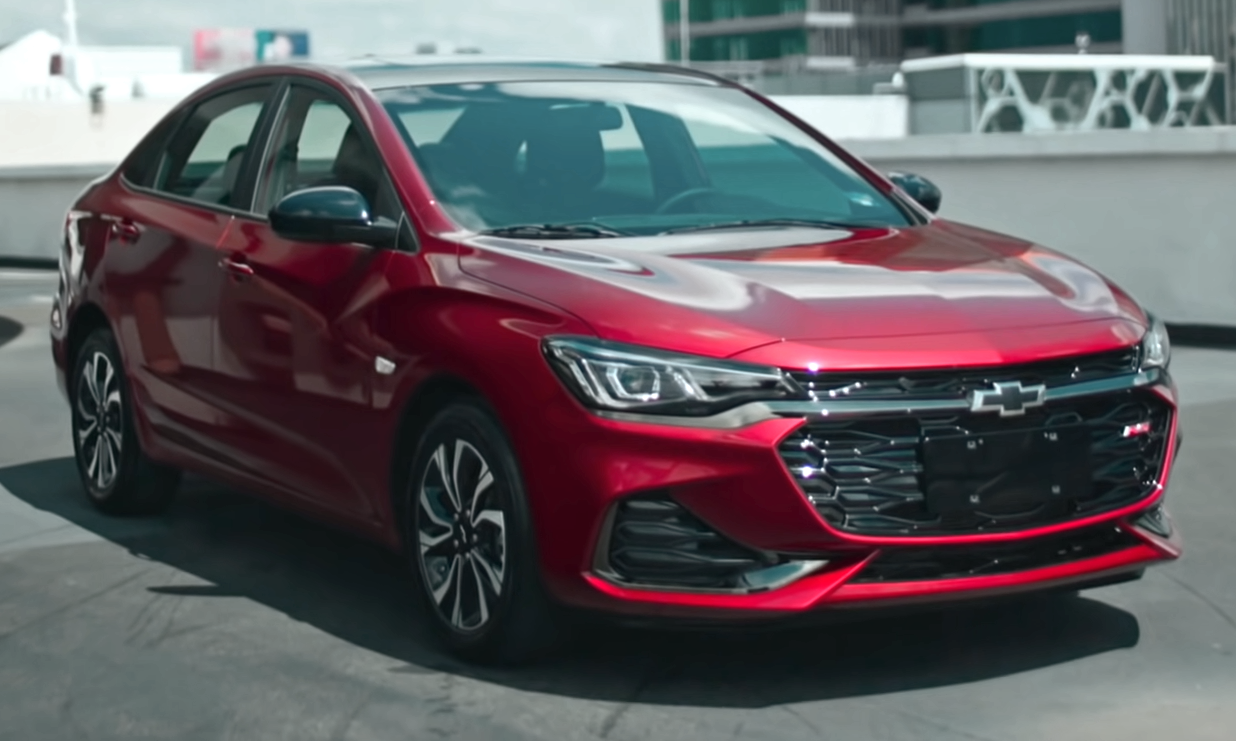
2022 Chevrolet Cavalier Turbo Premier (Mexico)

The fifth-generation Cavalier has been marketed in Mexico since late 2021 as a 2022 model. It is a rebadged version of the Chevrolet Monza sedan produced in China. Reflecting the new engine, it is marketed as the Cavalier Turbo. The engine is a 1,298 cc inline-four producing 161 hp (120 kW) and 170 lb⋅ft (230 N⋅m).

The Cavalier was discontinued in July 2025, leaving the Aveo and Onix as the only Chevrolet passenger cars sold in Mexico.

== Sales ==
Year	United States	China	Mexico	Japan
1982	58,904	-	-	-
1983	268,587	-	-	-
1984	462,611	-	-	-
1985	383,752	-	-	-
1986	432,101	-	-	-
1987	346,254	-	-	-
1988	322,939	-	-	-
1989	376,626	-	-	-
1990	310,501	-	-	-
1991	326,847	-	-	-
1992	225,633	-	-	-
1993	251,590	-	-	-
1994	254,426	-	-	-
1995	212,766	-	-	68
1996	277,122	-	-	1,628
1997	203,161	-	-	3,706
1998	256,101	-	-	3,992
1999	272,122	-	-	2,505
2000	236,803	-	-	702
2001	233,298	-	-	3
2002	238,225	-	-	-
2003	256,550	-	-	-
2004	195,275	-	-	-
2005	18,960	-	-	-
2006	355	-	-	-
2007	57	-	-	-
2016	-	50,786	-	-
2017	-	189,459	-	-
2018	-	252,108	16,255	-
2019	-	101,765	13,141	-
2020	-	39,261	6,270	-

== Engines ==
Engine design	Engine family	Production	RPO Code	Power	Torque	Notes
1.8 L (112 cu in) I4	GM 122 I4 engine	1982	L46	88 hp (66 kW)	100 lb⋅ft (136 N⋅m)	
2.0 L (122 cu in) I4	GM 122 I4 engine	1983	LQ5	86 hp (64 kW)	110 lb⋅ft (149 N⋅m)	
2.0 L (122 cu in) I4	GM 122 I4 engine	1984	LQ5	88 hp (66 kW)	110 lb⋅ft (149 N⋅m)	
2.0 L (122 cu in) I4	GM 122 I4 engine	1985–1986	LQ5	85 hp (63 kW)	110 lb⋅ft (149 N⋅m)	
2.0 L (122 cu in) I4	GM 122 I4 engine	1987–1989	LL8	90 hp (67 kW)	108 lb⋅ft (146 N⋅m)	
2.2 L (133 cu in) I4	GM 122 I4 engine	1990–1991	LM3	95 hp (71 kW)	120 lb⋅ft (163 N⋅m)	
2.2 L (133 cu in) I4	GM 122 I4 engine	1992–1993	LN2	110 hp (82 kW)	130 lb⋅ft (176 N⋅m)	
2.2 L (133 cu in) I4	GM 122 I4 engine	1994	LN2	120 hp (89 kW)	140 lb⋅ft (190 N⋅m)	
2.2 L (133 cu in) I4	GM 122 I4 engine	1995–1997	LN2	120 hp (89 kW)	130 lb⋅ft (176 N⋅m)	
2.2 L (133 cu in) I4	GM 122 I4 engine	1998–2002	LN2	115 hp (86 kW)	135 lb⋅ft (183 N⋅m)	
2.3 L (138 cu in) I4	Quad 4 I4	1995	LD2	125 hp (93 kW)	150 lb⋅ft (203 N⋅m)	
2.4 L (146 cu in) I4	Quad 4 I4	1996	LD9	150 hp (112 kW)	150 lb⋅ft (203 N⋅m)	
2.4 L (146 cu in) I4	Quad 4 I4	1997–2002	LD9	150 hp (112 kW)	155 lb⋅ft (210 N⋅m)	
2.2 L (135 cu in) I4	GM Ecotec I4	2002–2005	L61	140 hp (104 kW)	150 lb⋅ft (203 N⋅m)	
2.8 L (173 cu in) V6	General Motors 60° V6 engine	1985	LB6	125 hp (93 kW)	155 lb⋅ft (210 N⋅m)	
2.8 L (173 cu in) V6	General Motors 60° V6 engine	1986	LB6	120 hp (89 kW)	155 lb⋅ft (210 N⋅m)	
2.8 L (173 cu in) V6	General Motors 60° V6 engine	1987–1989	LB6	125 hp (93 kW)	160 lb⋅ft (217 N⋅m)	
3.1 L (191 cu in) V6	General Motors 60° V6 engine	1990	LH0	135 hp (101 kW)	180 lb⋅ft (244 N⋅m)	2.53 or 3.61 final drive
3.1 L (191 cu in) V6	General Motors 60° V6 engine	1990	LH0	140 hp (104 kW)	185 lb⋅ft (251 N⋅m)	2.84 final drive
3.1 L (191 cu in) V6	General Motors 60° V6 engine	1991–1994	LH0	140 hp (104 kW)	185 lb⋅ft (251 N⋅m)	

Note: Engines listed are for first, second and third generation Cavalier models only
