= Buick Century =

Line of upscale performance cars

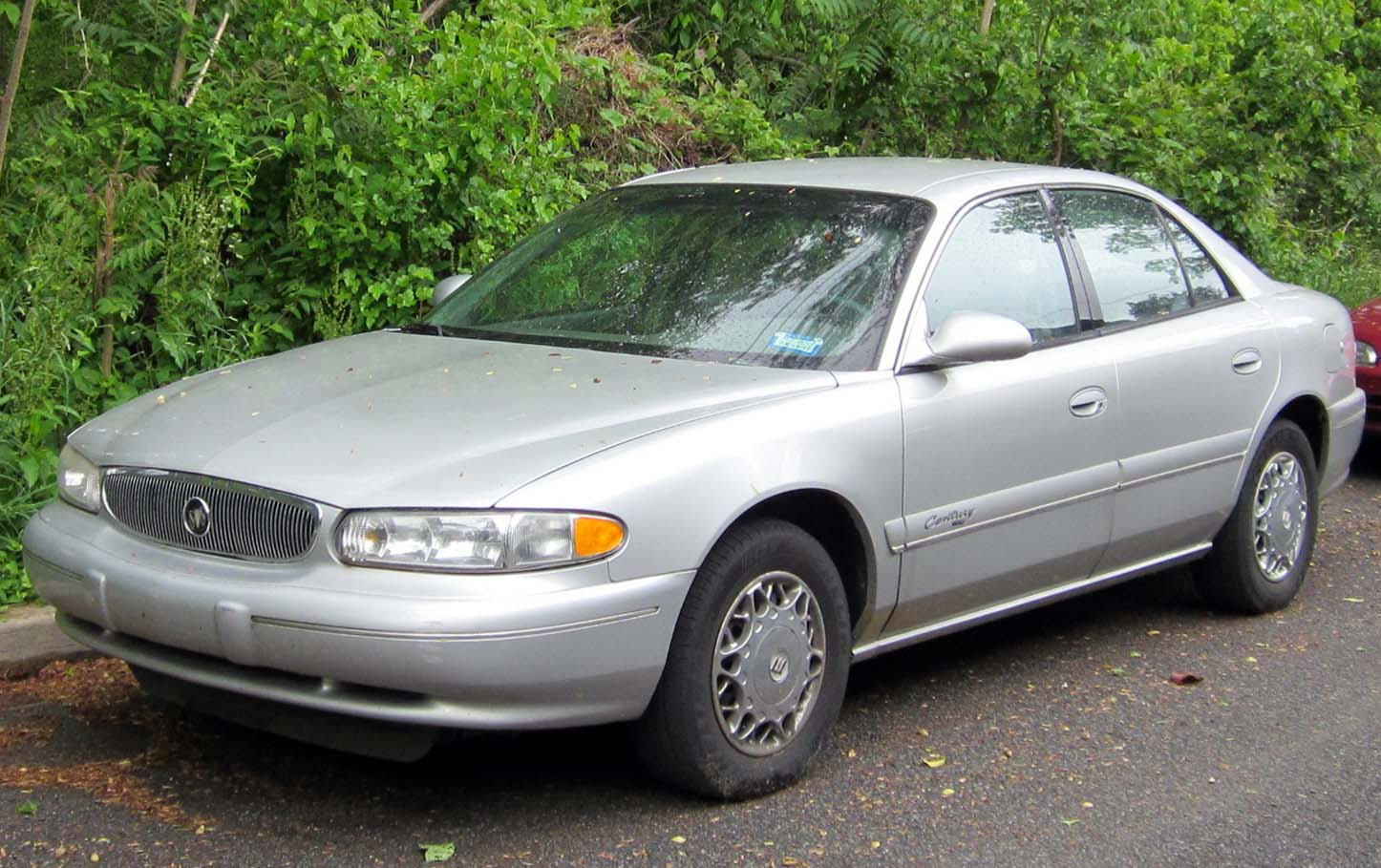

Overview
- Manufacturer: Buick (General Motors)
- Model years: 1936–1942; 1954–1958; 1973–2005

Body and chassis
- Class: Full-size car (1936–1958); Mid-size car (1973–2005)
- Body style: 2-door coupe; 4-door sedan; 4-door station wagon
- Layout: FR layout (1936–1981); Transverse front-engine, front-wheel drive (1982–2005)

Chronology
- Predecessor: Buick Master Six
- Successor: Buick LaCrosse (2005–2009); Buick Regal TourX

Buick Century is the model name that was used by Buick for a line of upscale full-size cars from 1936 to 1942 and 1954 to 1958, as well as from 1973 to 2005 for mid-size cars.

The first Buick Century debuted as the Series 60, then was renamed in 1936 as a shorter and lighter model featuring the same engine as the bigger Roadmaster and Limited series, giving it more performance while using the shorter wheelbase body of the Buick Special. During the 1930s and 1940s it was Buick's companion to the top level Roadmaster and was offered as a two-door and four-door sedan and convertible. The Century name was used on six generations of cars of varying sizes as well as performance and trim levels. In 1969, Buick developed a concept car known as the Century Cruiser. In the 1970s, the Century Regal became a separate model and market positioning between the two products changed from year to year depending on sales. The Century was updated to front wheel drive in 1982 and was Buick's two-door coupe, four-door sedan and station wagon, with regular updates and feature upgrades as customer preferences changed over time.

== Series 60 (1930–1935) ==
Series 60
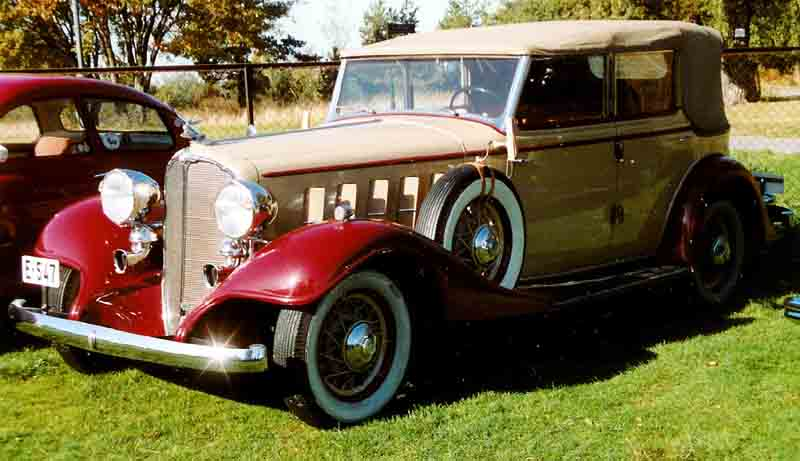
- 1933 Buick Series 60 Model 68C Convertible Phaeton

Overview
- Model years: 1930–1935
- Assembly: Buick City, Flint, Michigan, United States
- Designer: Harley Earl

Body and chassis
- Class: Full-size car
- Body style: 2-door coupe 2-door convertible 4-door phaeton 4-door sedan
- Layout: Front-engine, rear-wheel-drive
- Platform: GM B platform
- Related: McLaughlin-Buick

Powertrain
- Engine: 331.4 cu in (5.4 L) Buick Straight-6 engine OHV I6; 220.7 cu in (3.6 L) Buick Straight-8 engine OHV I8; 230.4 cu in (3.8 L) Buick Straight-8 engine OHV I8; 278 cu in (4.6 L) Buick Straight-8 engine OHV I8
- Transmission: 3-speed synchromesh manual

Dimensions
- Wheelbase: 114 in (2,896 mm); 119 in (3,023 mm); 124 in (3,150 mm)

Originally, the Series 60 had the 331.4 cu in (5.4 L) OHV Buick Straight-6 engine from the Series 70, developing 99 bhp (74 kW) at 2,800 rpm. It had, at the beginning of the generation, a full-length running board denoting the top model for Buick at the time, shared with the short wheelbase, entry level Series 40. In 1930, GM built 38,180 cars. The bodystyles available were torpedo, sedan, coupe, and roadster convertible, using GM's "B-body" platform. Starting with this generation, all GM cars shared a corporate appearance as a result of the "Art and Colour Section" headed by Harley J. Earl and modest yearly changes were introduced to freshen the appearance.

In 1931, the running board was reduced and the OHV 220.7 cu in (3.6 L) Buick Straight-8 engine was introduced that developed 90 bhp (67 kW). Aesthetically, the Series 60 remained almost unchanged, and the same fact occurred also in the following year. In 1931 and 1932, a total of 55,135 were produced.

In 1933, the length of the body increased and the radiator was now concealed behind a façade with a grille. The engine power increased to 97 hp (72 kW), and 1933 was the first year all GM vehicles were installed with optional vent windows which were initially called “No Draft Individually Controlled Ventilation” later renamed "Ventiplanes". In 1934, the appearance was changed to a more rounded appearance, with a new OHV 278 cu in (4.6 L) eight-cylinder engine and 100 hp. In 1935, the model remained almost unchanged while the body style selections were similar to larger Buicks but more affordably priced. Six choices were available to include both 2- and 4-door convertibles using the term "phaeton" for the 4-door convertible with a listed price of US$1,675 ($39,334 in 2025 dollars). Total production from 1933 to 1935 was 31,385. In 1936, the model changed its name to "Century".

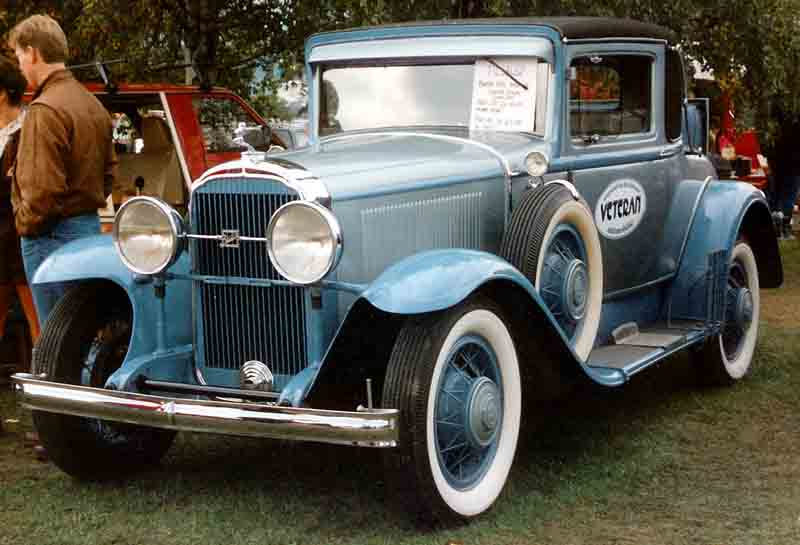
1931 Buick Series 60 Sport Coupe

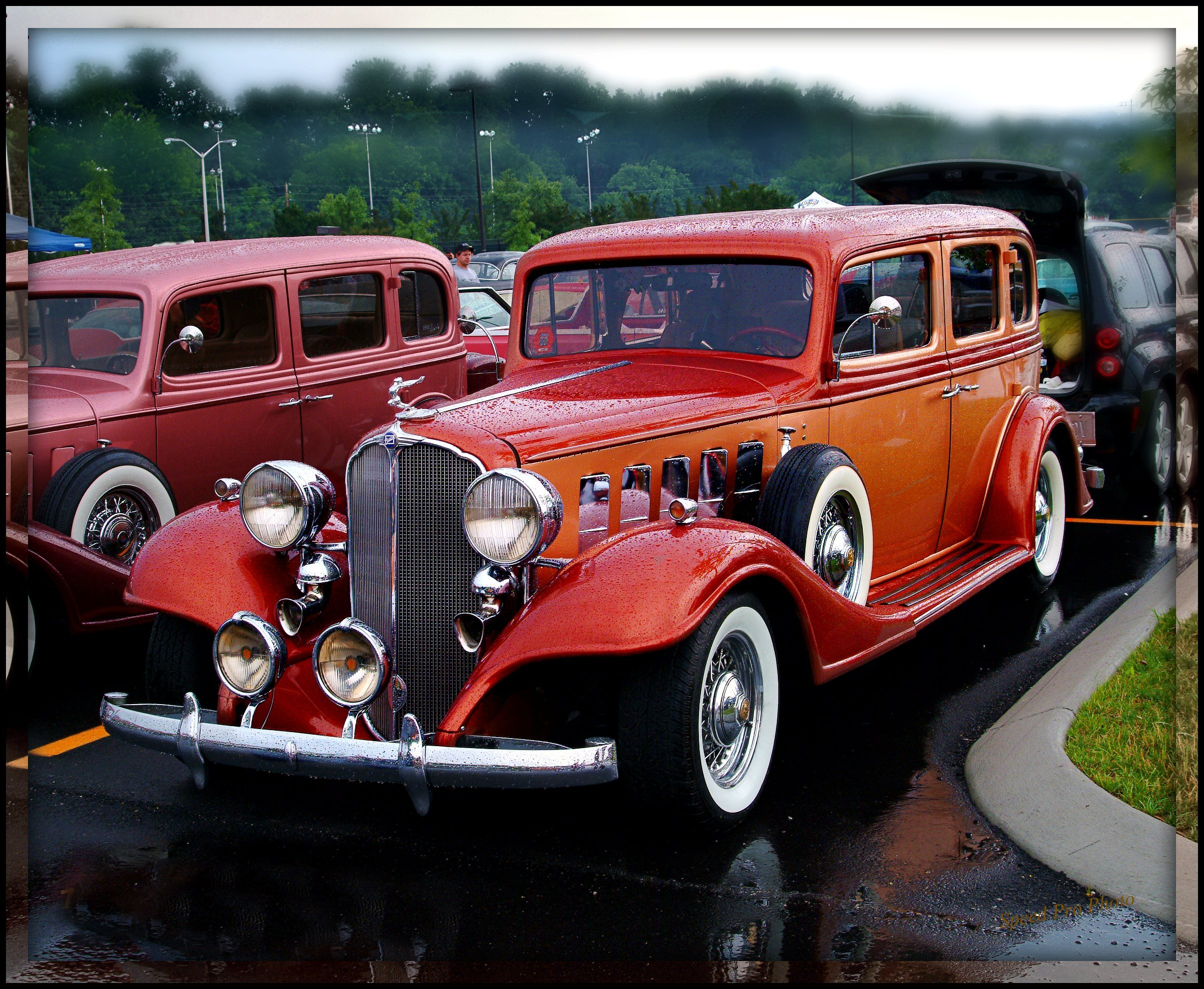
1933 Buick Series 60 Sedan Model 67

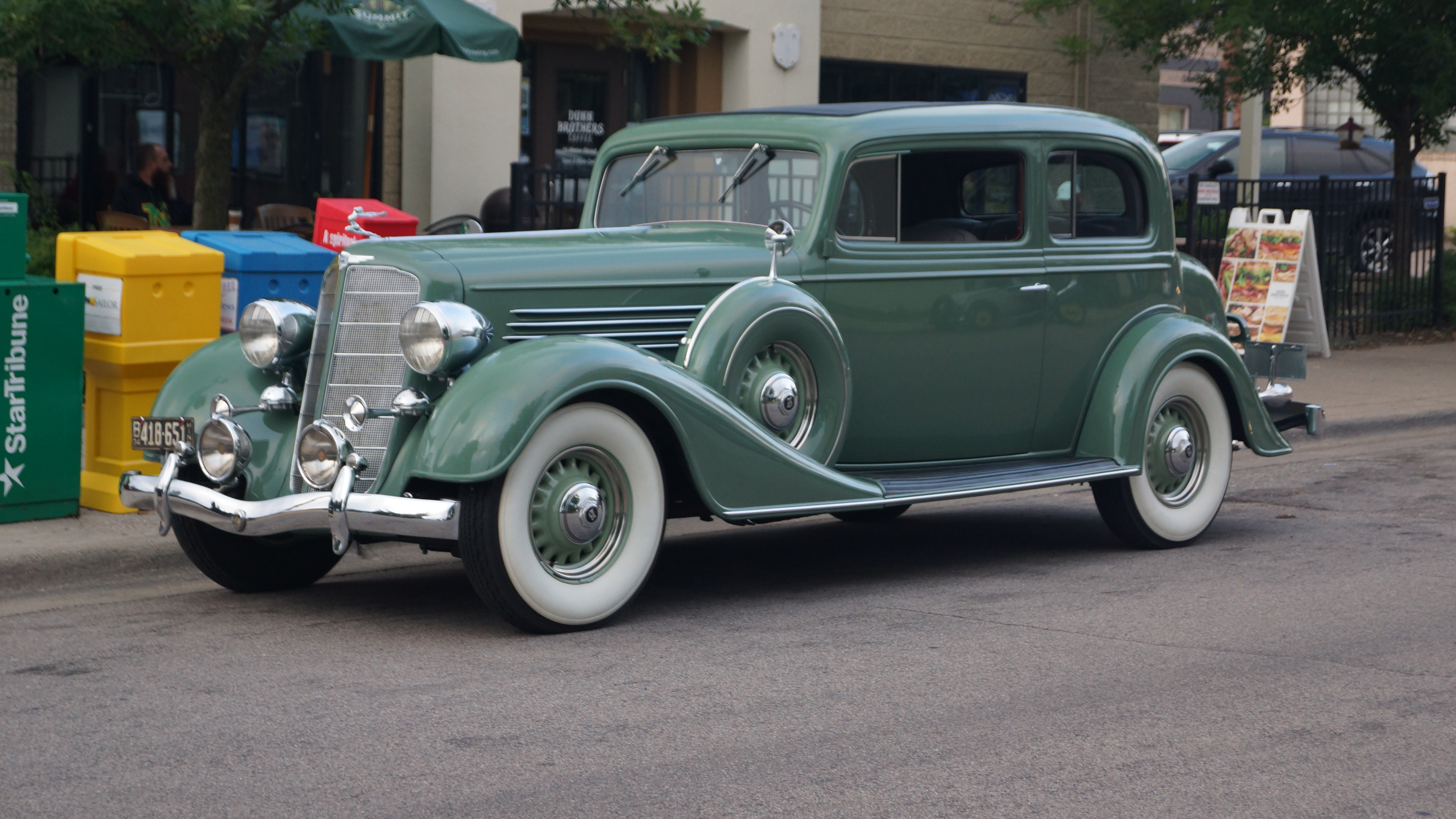
1934 Buick Series 60 Victoria Coupe Model 68

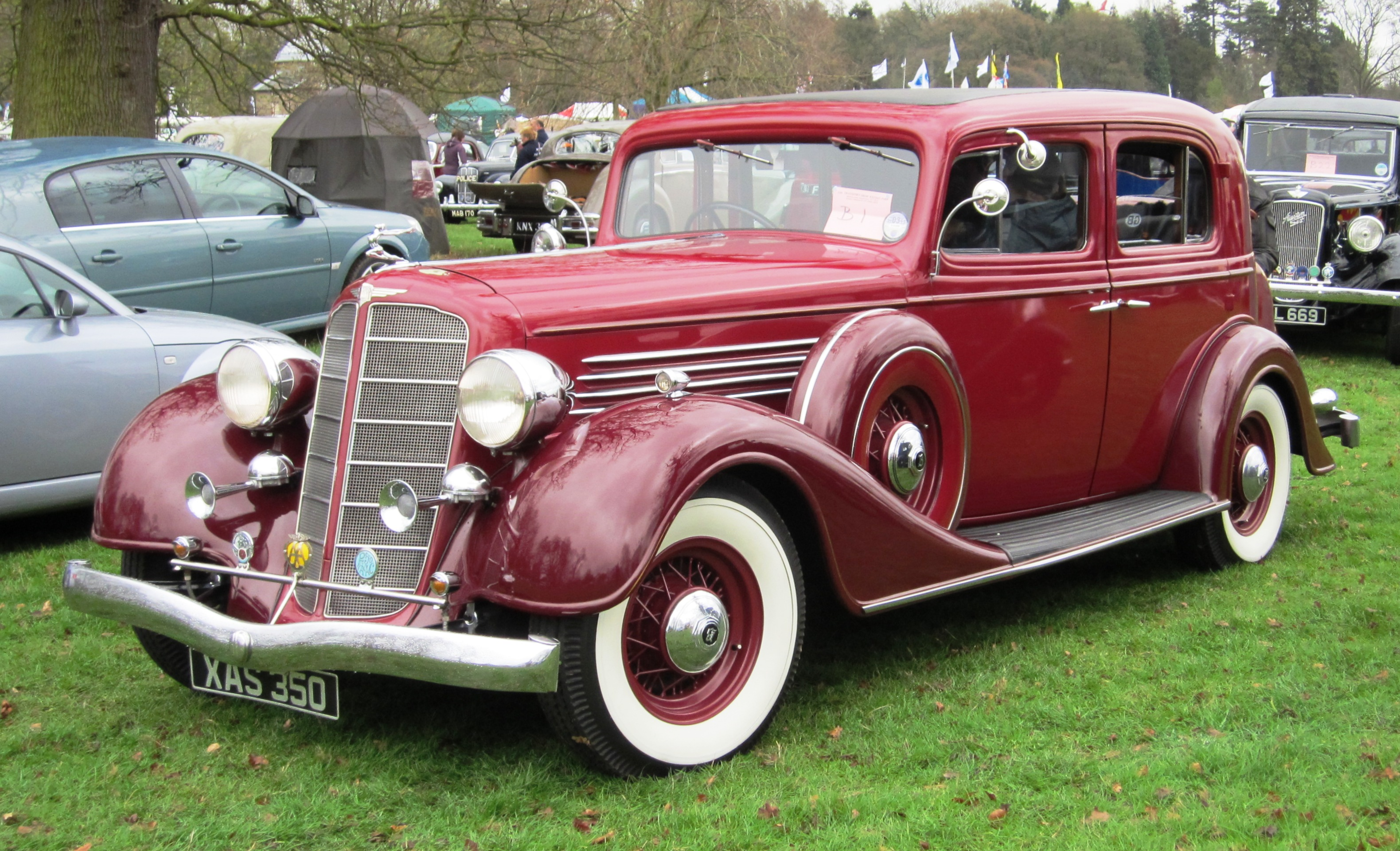
1935 Buick Series 60 Sedan

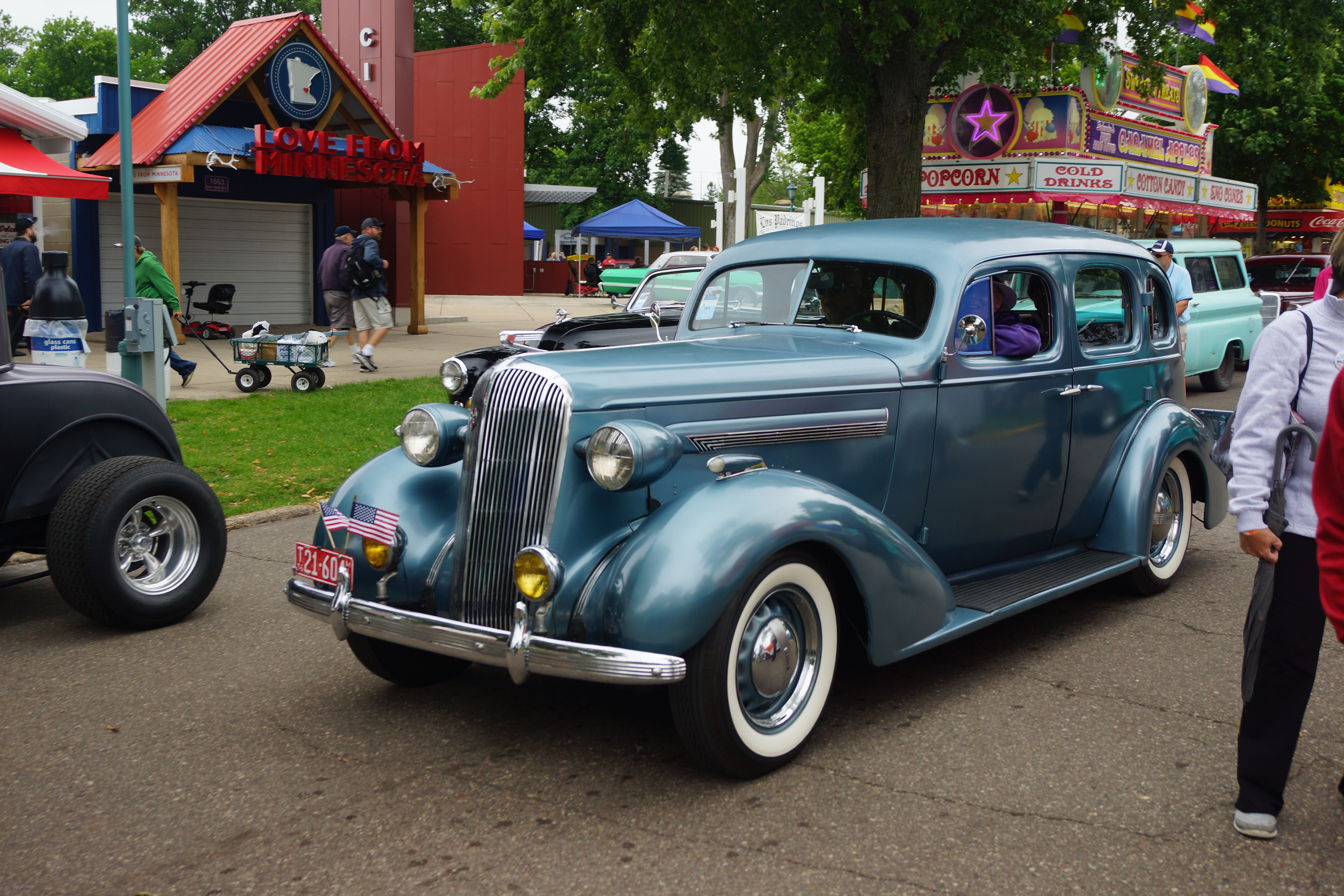
1936 Buick Series 60 Sedan

== First generation (1936–1942) ==
First generation
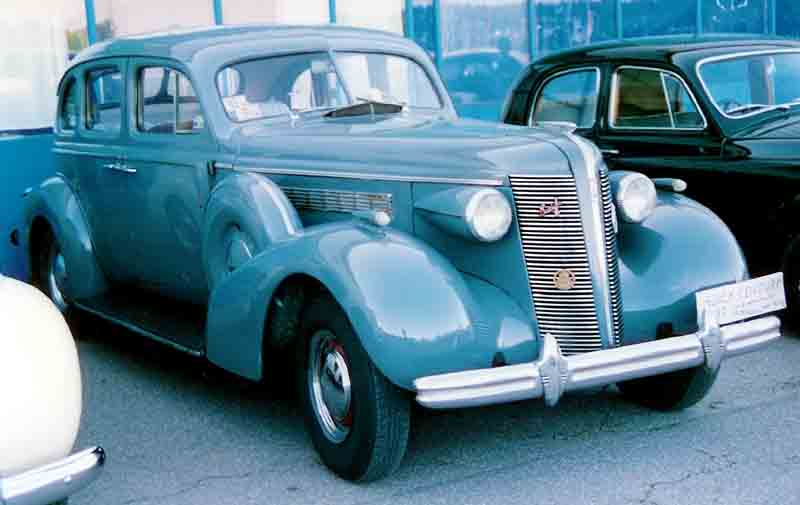
- 1937 Buick Century Series 60 Model 64 4-Door Touring Sedan

Overview
- Model years: 1936–1942
- Assembly: Buick City, Flint, Michigan; South Gate Assembly, South Gate, California; Linden Assembly, Linden, New Jersey

Body and chassis
- Class: Full-size car
- Body style: 2-door coupe 2-door convertible 4-door phaeton 4-door sedan
- Layout: FR layout
- Platform: B-body
- Related: Cadillac Series 60; Cadillac Series 61; LaSalle Series 50; Buick Special; McLaughlin-Buick; Oldsmobile L-Series; Oldsmobile Series 70; Pontiac Streamliner Torpedo; Pontiac Streamliner

Powertrain
- Engine: 320 cu in (5.2 L) Fireball I8 OHV
- Transmission: 3-speed synchromesh manual Automatic Safety Transmission (1938 only)

Dimensions
- Wheelbase: 122 in (3,099 mm) (1936); 126 in (3,200 mm) (1937-42)
- Length: 197 in (5,004 mm) (1936); 204 in (5,182 mm) (1937-42)

Buick renamed its entire model lineup for the 1936 model year to celebrate the engineering improvements and design advancements over their 1935 models, introducing a "streamlined" appearance. Buick's Series 40 model range became the Special, the Series 60 became the Century, the Series 80 became the Roadmaster, and the Series 90, Buick's longest and most luxurious vehicles, became the Limited. The terminology "Series 60" and "Series 70" were shared with Cadillac, while "Series 60", "Series 70", "Series 80" and "Series 90" were shared with Oldsmobile.

The basic formula for the 1936 to 1942 Century was established by mating the shorter wheelbase Special bodies to the Roadmaster's larger displacement straight-eight engine. The Century offered four different types of 2-door body styles to include convertibles and only one 4-door Sedan, with the ratio remaining coupes over sedans until 1938 when there were three coupe and three sedan choices. The 1940 Series 50 Super combined the longer Roadmaster body with the smaller displacement Special engine.

While the Special was powered by Buick's OHV 233 cu in (3.8 L) straight-8 engine, rated 93 hp (69 kW) at 3200 rpm, Centurys produced between 1936 and 1942 were powered by the OHV 320 cu in (5.2 L) straight-8 producing 141 hp (105 kW), making them the fastest Buicks of the era and capable of sustained speeds of 100 mph (161 km/h), hence the name Century (100), earning the Century the nickname "the banker's hot rod". Prices listed for the 2-door Victoria Coupe started at US$1,055 ($24,478 in 2025 dollars) to US$1,135 ($26,271 in 2025 dollars) for the 2-door Convertible. By 1940 prices rose to US$1,175 ($27,003 in 2025 dollars) for the Sport Coupe to US$1,620 ($37,229 in 2025 dollars) for the 4-door Convertible Phaeton.

The Century was discontinued at the end of the abbreviated 1942 model year due to World War II, when production of passenger vehicles stopped on February 4, 1942, during which total model production only accounted for about 10% of Buick's total output.

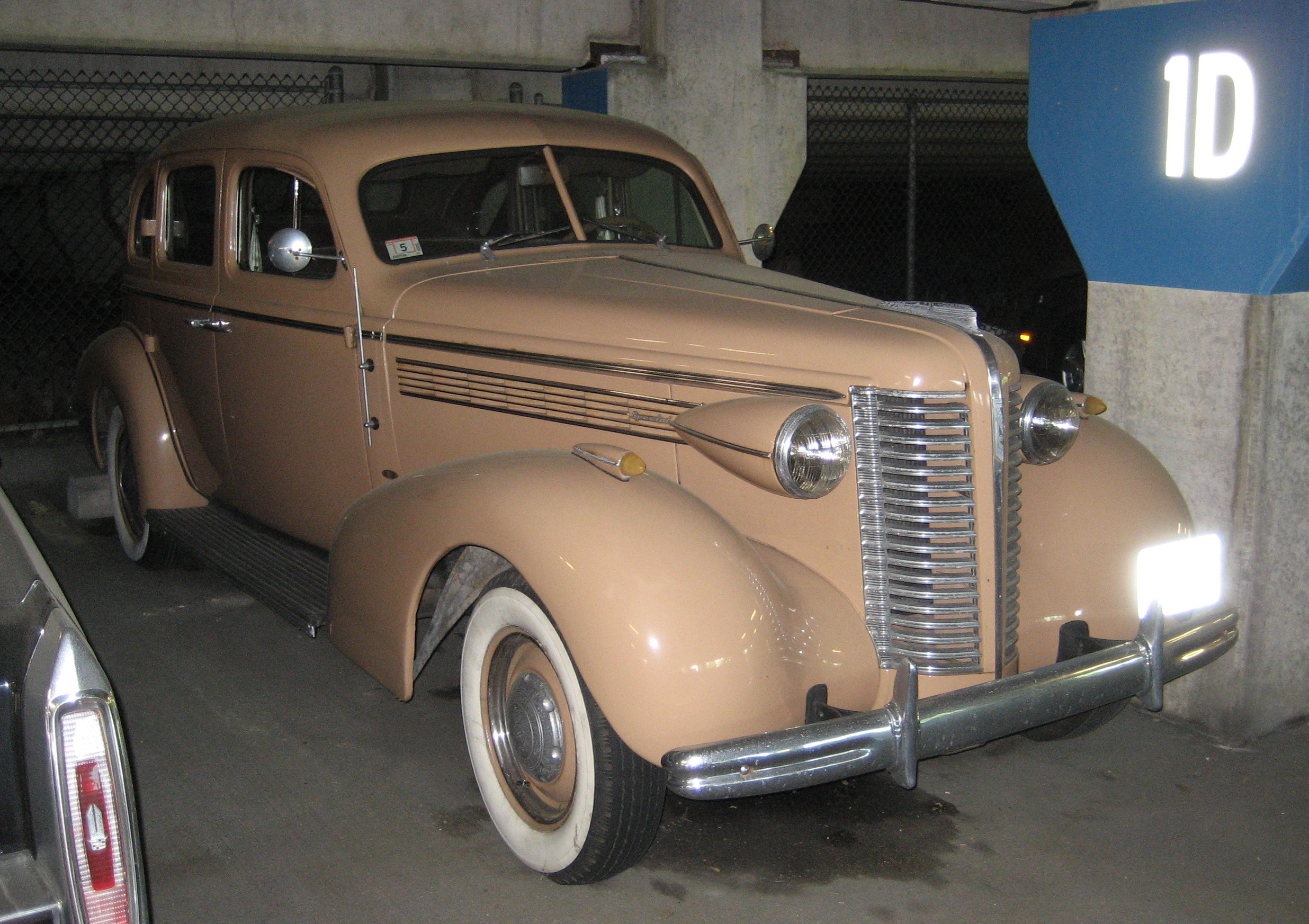
1938 Buick Century Series 60 Touring Sedan Model 61

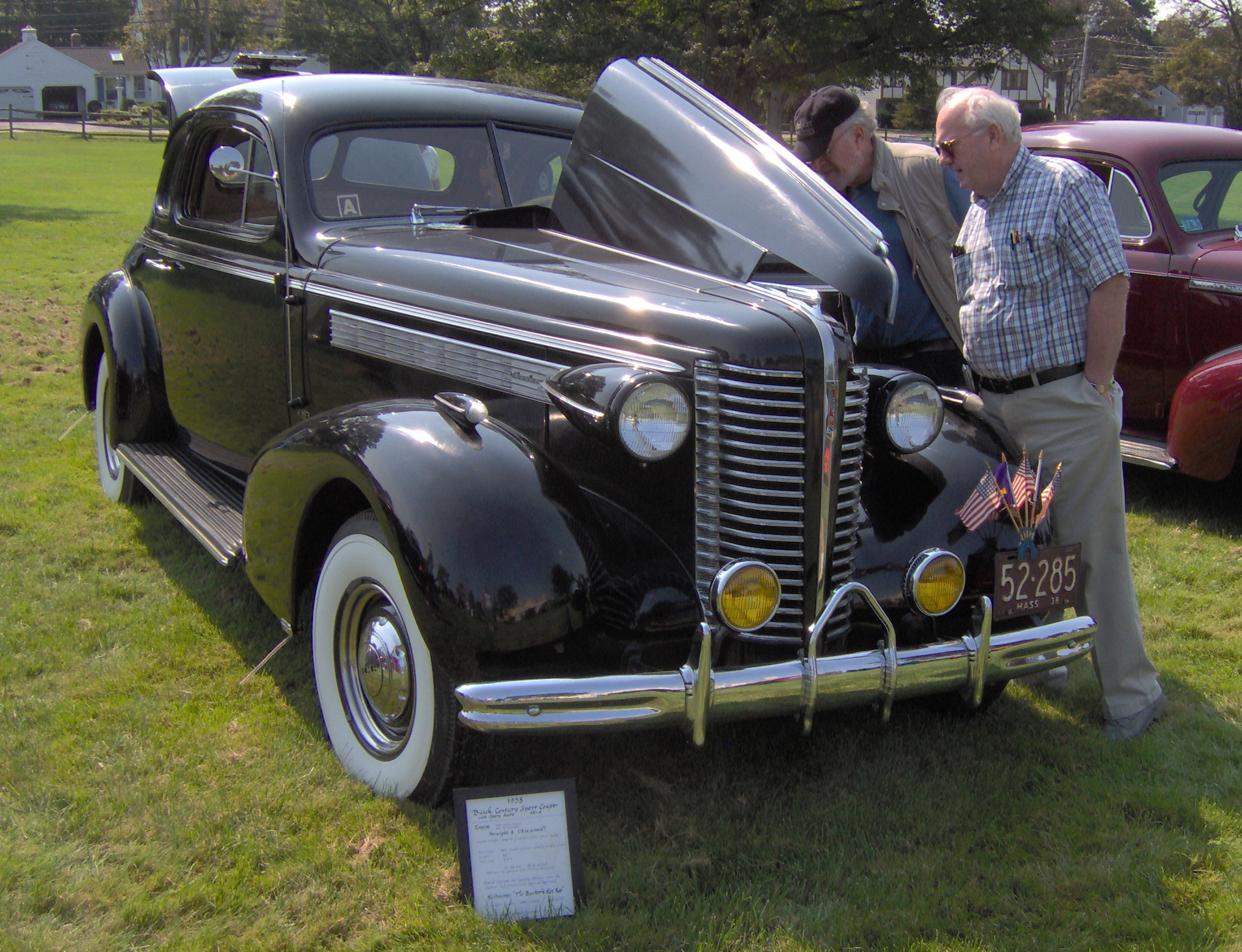
1938 Buick Century Series 60 Sport Coupe Model 665

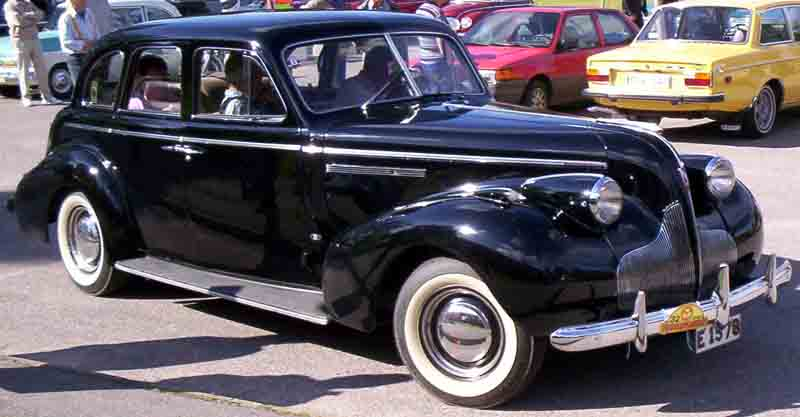
1939 Buick Century Series 60 Touring Sedan Model 61

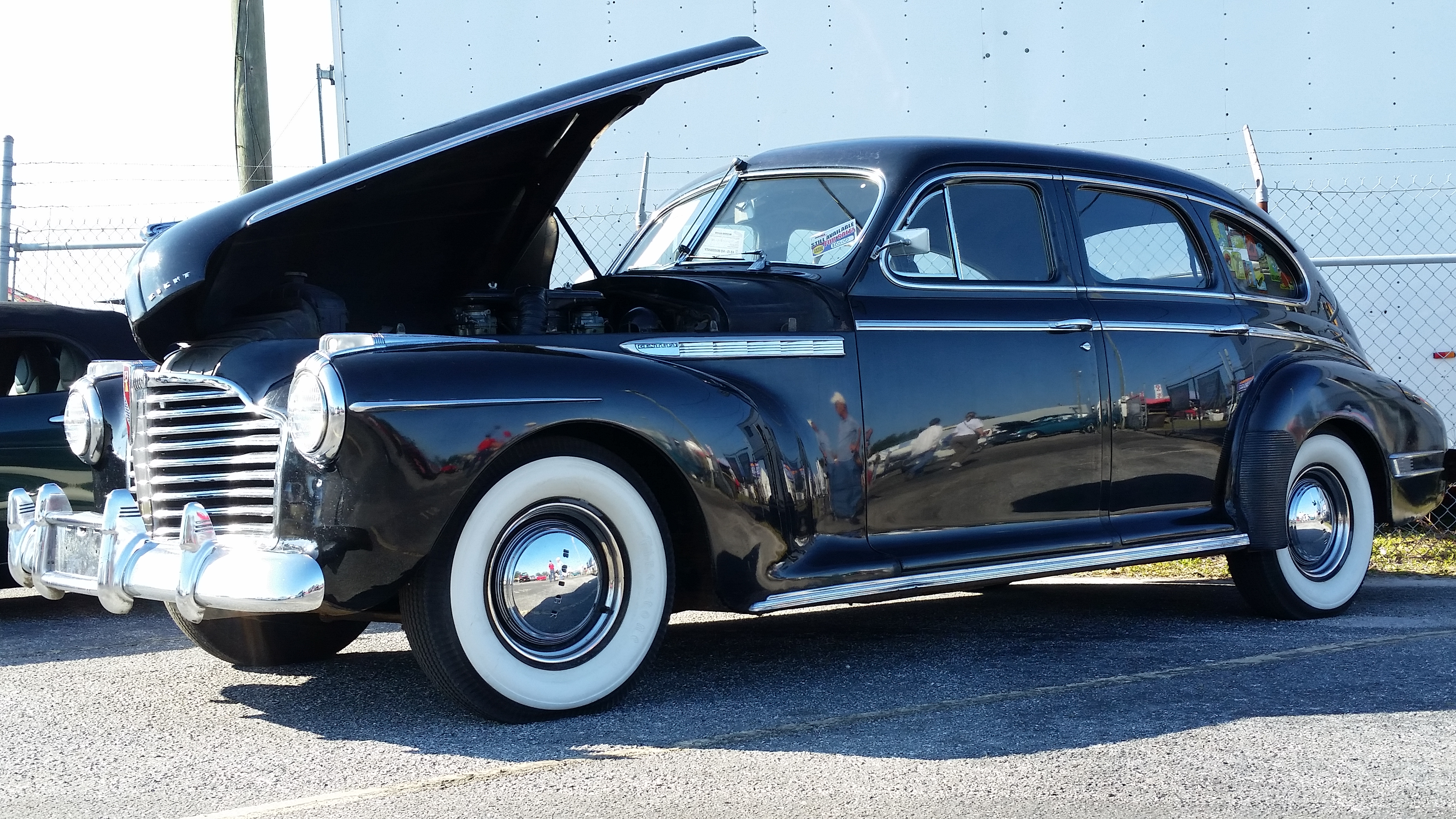
1941 Buick Century Series 60 Touring Sedan Model 61

== Second generation (1954–1958) ==
Second generation
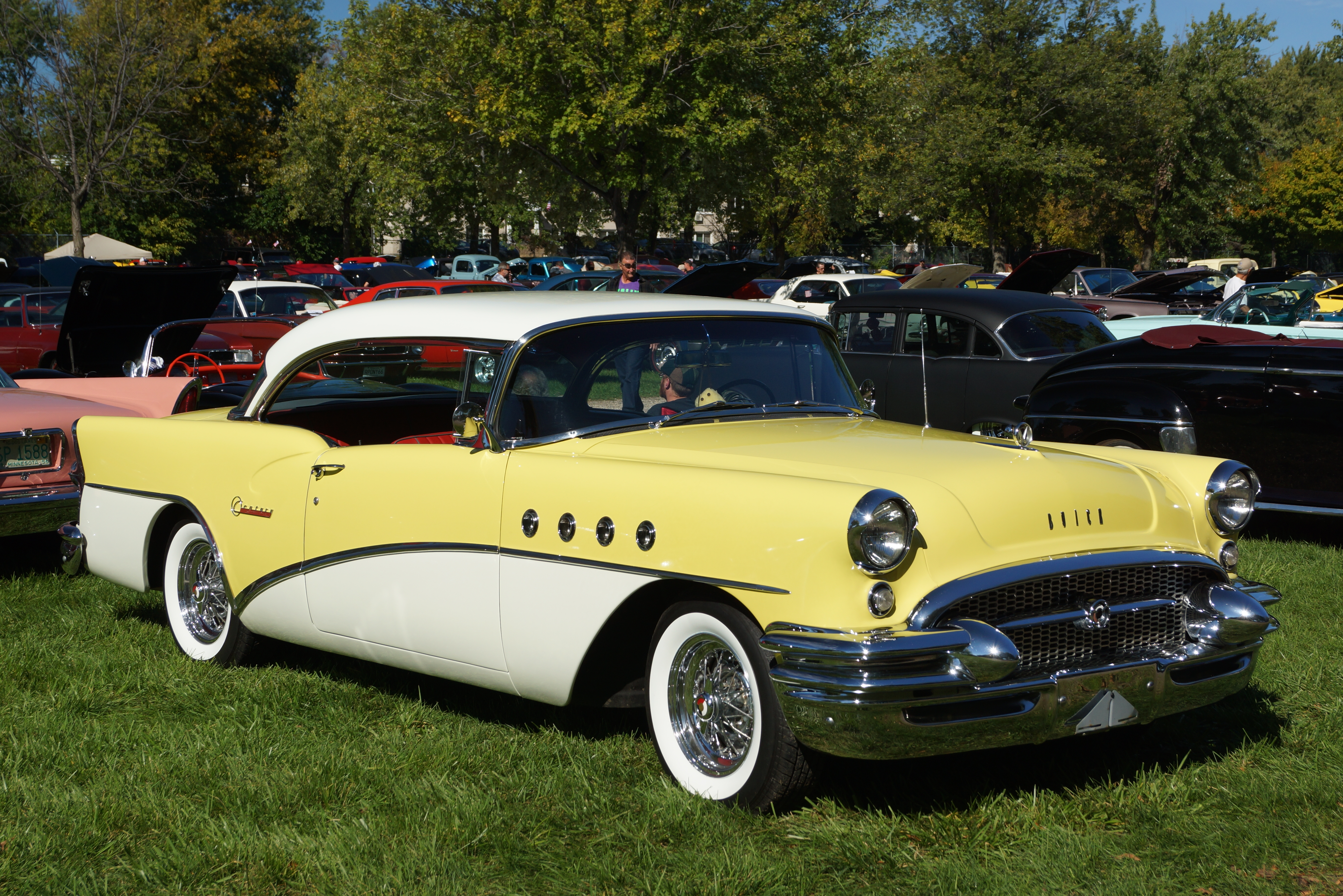
- 1955 Century Riviera

Overview
- Model years: 1954–1958
- Assembly: Buick City, Flint, Michigan; Arlington Assembly (Texas; 1955–1958); Doraville Assembly (Georgia); Fairfax Assembly (Kansas City, Kansas); Framingham Assembly (Massachusetts); Linden Assembly (New Jersey); South Gate Assembly (California); Wilmington Assembly (Delaware)

Body and chassis
- Class: Full-size car
- Body style: 4-door sedan 2-door coupe 2-door convertible 4-door hardtop Estate station wagon
- Layout: FR layout
- Platform: B-body
- Related: Oldsmobile 88

Powertrain
- Engine: 322 cu in (5.3 L) Fireball V8 OHV; 364 cu in (6.0 L) Fireball V8 OHV
- Transmission: 2-speed Dynaflow automatic

Dimensions
- Wheelbase: 122 in (3,099 mm)
- Length: 206.3 in (5,240 mm) (1954); 206.7 in (5,250 mm) (1955); 205.1 in (5,210 mm) (1956); 208.4 in (5,293 mm)(1957); 211.8 in (5,380 mm) (1958)
- Width: 76 in (1,930 mm) (1954–55)
- Height: 60.5 in (1,537 mm) (1954); 59.8 in (1,519 mm) (1956)

Chronology
- Successor: Buick Invicta

Buick reintroduced the Century using the same formula of mating the smaller, lighter Buick Special body to its largest and most powerful 322 cu in (5.3 L) "Fireball" OHV V8 engine mated with a Dynaflow automatic transmission, with the intent of giving Buick a performance vehicle. Included in the model lineup during this period was a station wagon model, a body style that had been unavailable during the Century's first production period of 1936 until 1942. In 1953 The Buick-Berle Show introduced product placement commercials on TV, and later in 1955 The Honeymooners was one of the sponsors.

Introduced in the middle of the 1955 model year, the four-door Buick Century Riviera along with the four-door Special Riviera, the four-door Oldsmobile 98 Holiday, and four-door 88 Holiday, were the first four-door hardtops ever produced. For the first time, the Century was repositioned below the C-body Buick Super and priced lower. It continued to feature four "VentiPorts" on the front fenders like the larger Buick Roadmaster indicating its status equal to the Super, denoting it was a junior level Buick using the shorter B-body. It also introduced the "Panoramic" one-piece wrap around windshield on all GM cars for 1955.

In 1955, the California Highway Patrol placed a large fleet order for 270 Century two-door sedans, a body style unavailable to the general public. It combined the Special two-door sedan body shell with Century powertrain, of which 135 were Dynaflow automatics and 135 were manual transmissions. Broderick Crawford was shown driving a two-door Century sedan during the first season of his popular syndicated TV series Highway Patrol. These Century two-door sedans were actual police vehicles owned by the California Highway Patrol and were loaned to the TV production company, the CHP door emblems were changed to a generic highway patrol emblem. (In later seasons, he drove a four-door Century but these were not California Highway Patrol owned vehicles.) Power brakes were optional. Tubeless tires were new.

The Century remained Buick's performance line, with engine power rising from 200 hp (149 kW; 203 PS) (SAE gross) in 1954, to 236 hp (176 kW) in 1955, to 255 hp (190 kW) in 1956, and topping out at 300 hp (224 kW) from a bored-out 364 cu in (6.0 L) engine in 1957 and 1958, the last model years for the full-sized Century line.

In 1956, the Century's base price was US$2,963 ($35,088 in 2025 dollars). Power windows were standard in the convertible. A padded safety dash became optional.

For 1957, Buick styling was notable for its three-piece rear window design. This was a feature in all series fixed-roof body-styles, (excluding wagons and convertibles). Oldsmobile also used this 3-piece rear window design that year, marketed as the “Twin-Strutted Rear Window.”

Because the Century was considered the senior "small Buick", the model received a version of GM's hardtop station wagon, the Century Caballero Estate for the 1957 and 1958 model years and was not continued for 1959.

For 1959, Buick renamed the Century the Invicta.

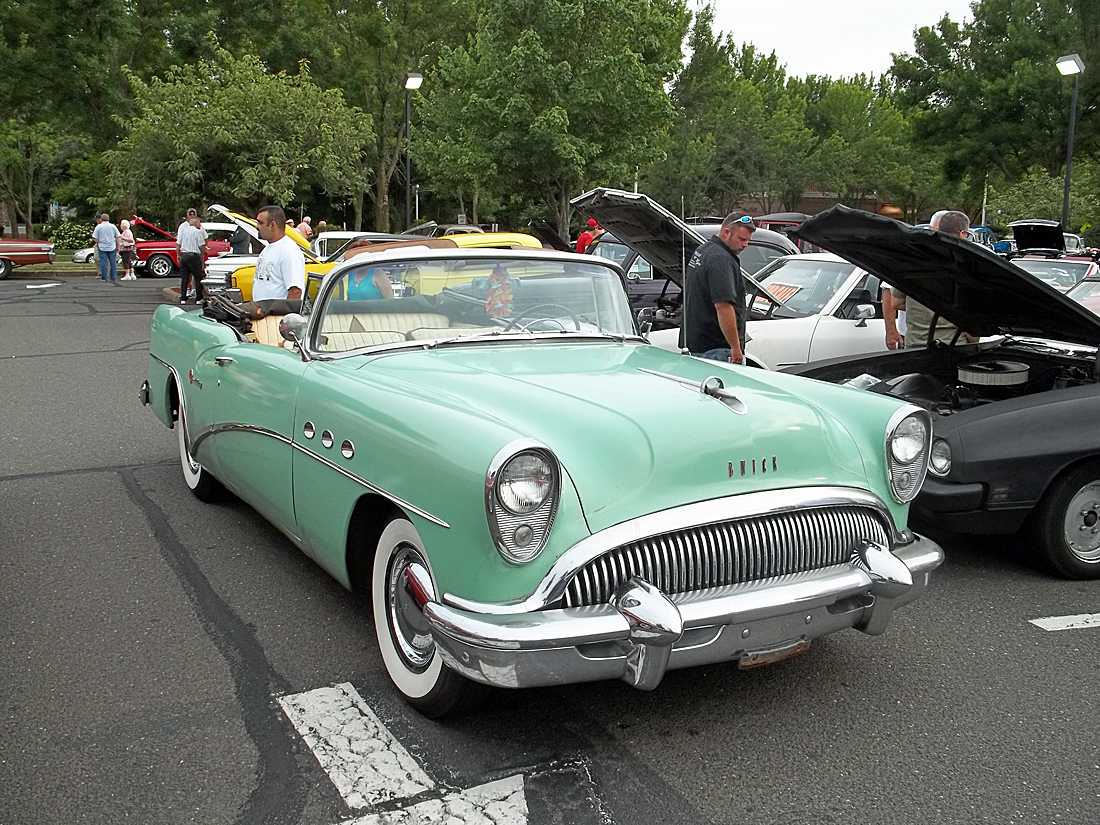
1954 Buick Century convertible

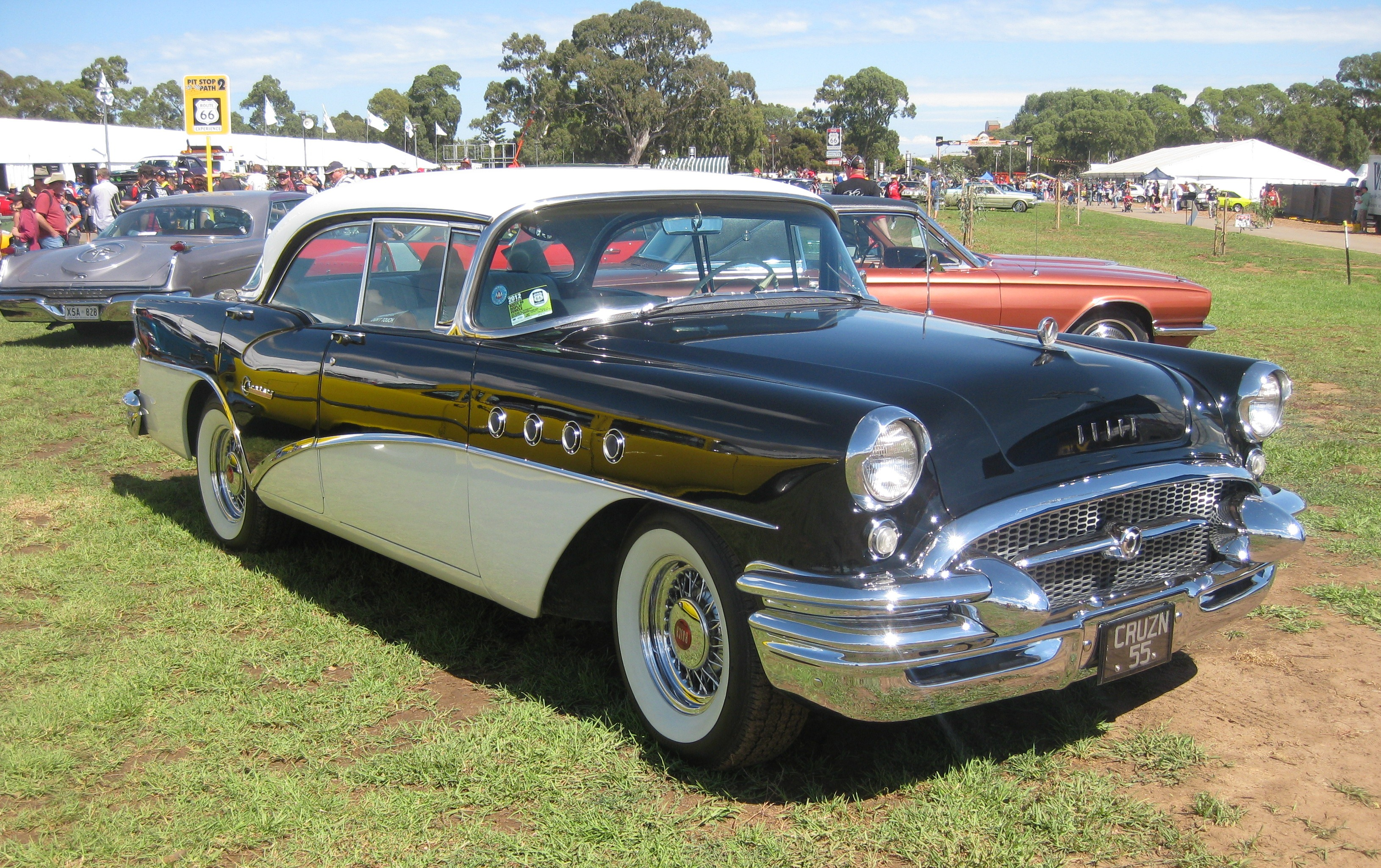
1955 Buick Century 4-door Riviera

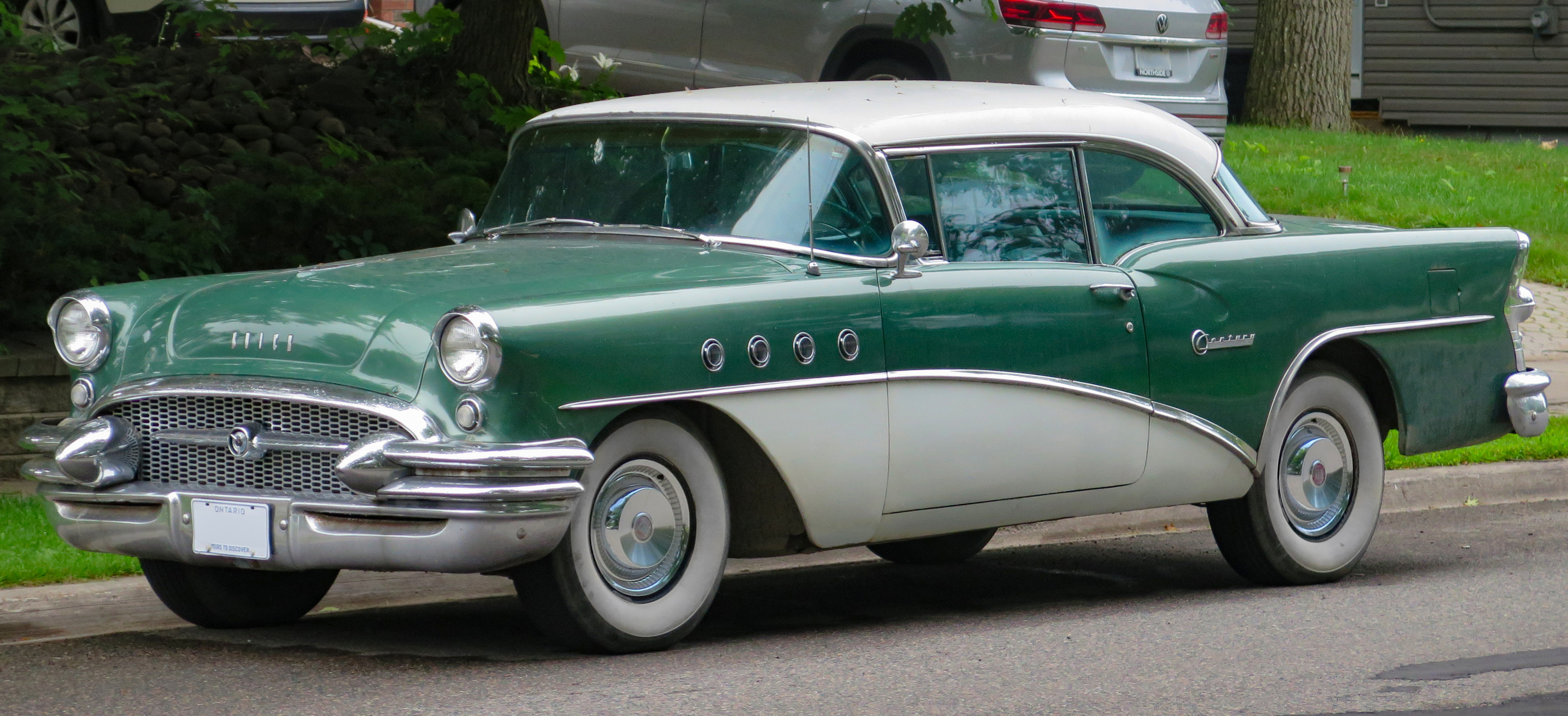
1955 Buick Century 2-door Riviera

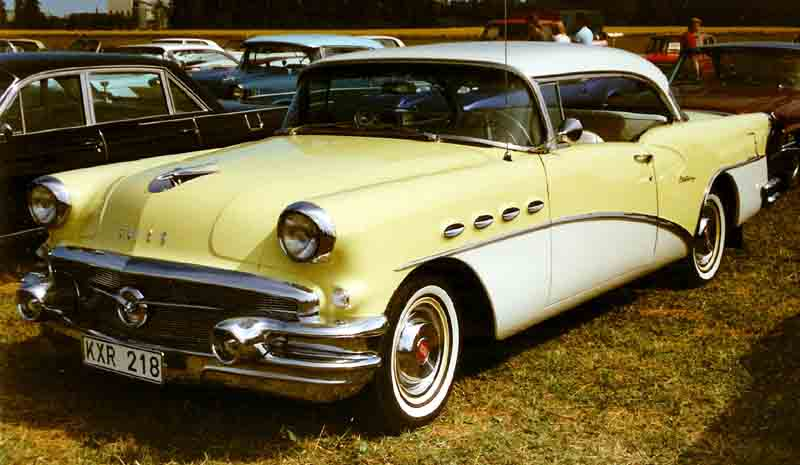
1956 Buick Century 2-door Riviera

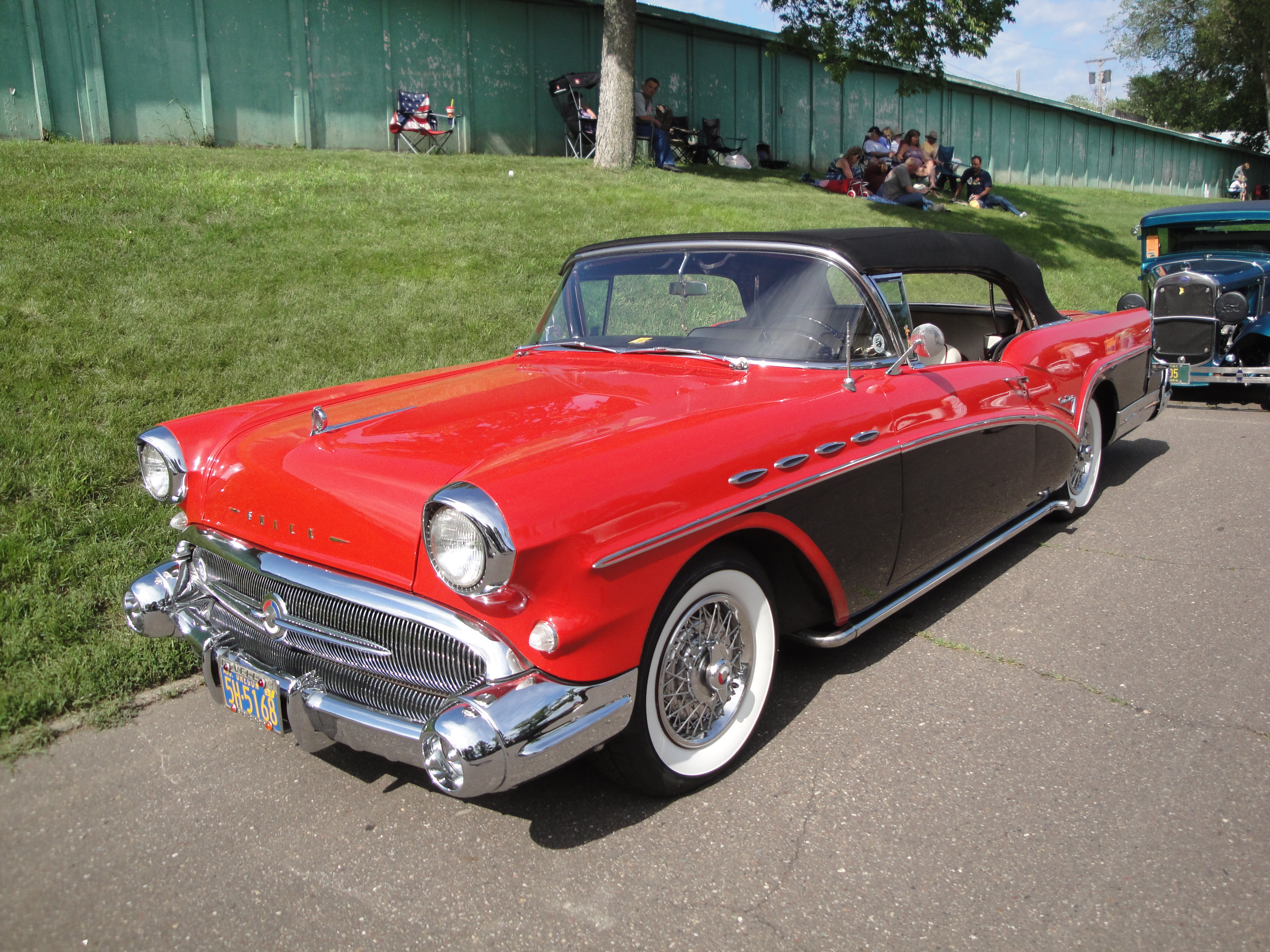
1957 Buick Century Riviera convertible

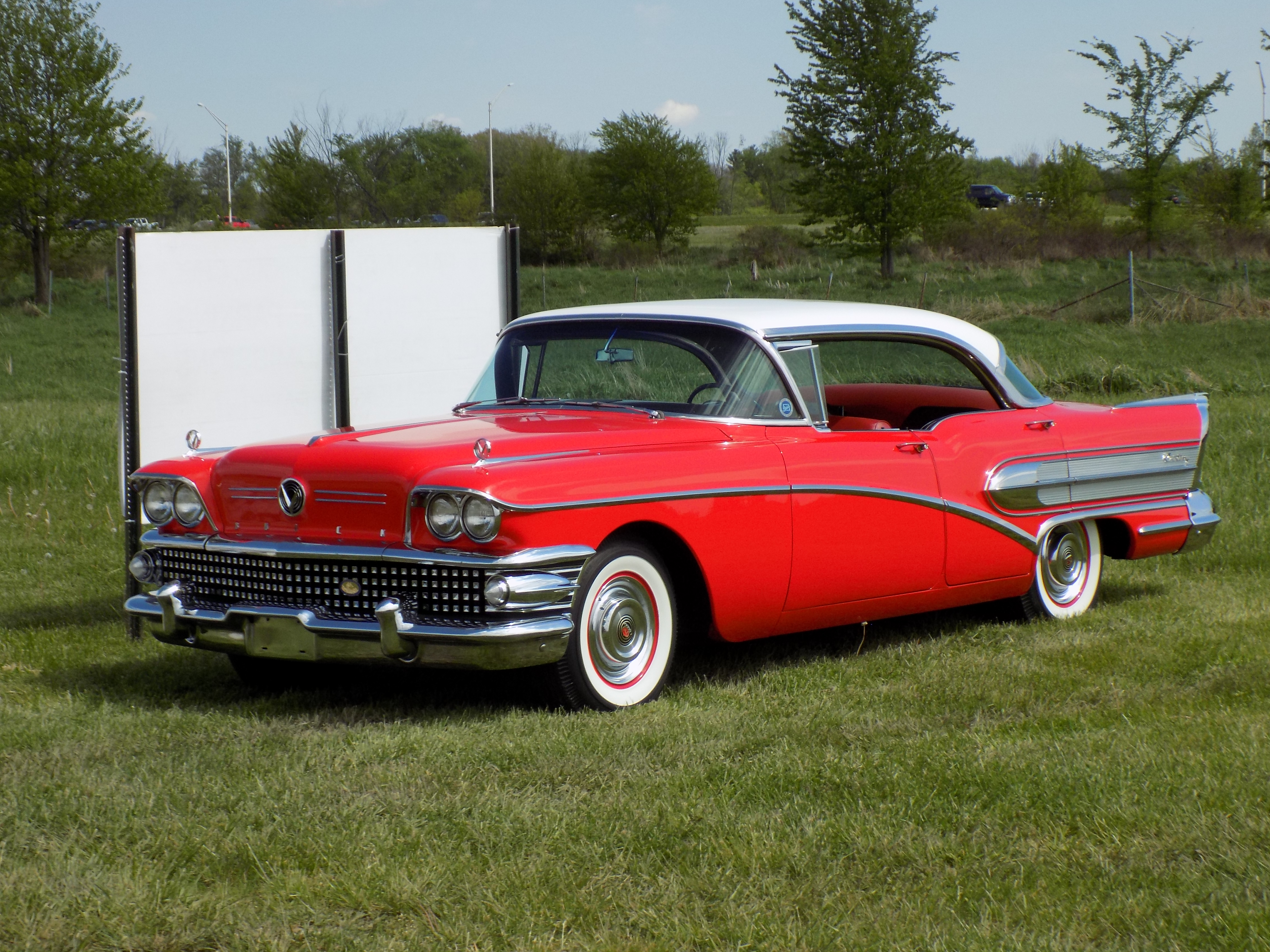
1958 Buick Century 4-door Riviera

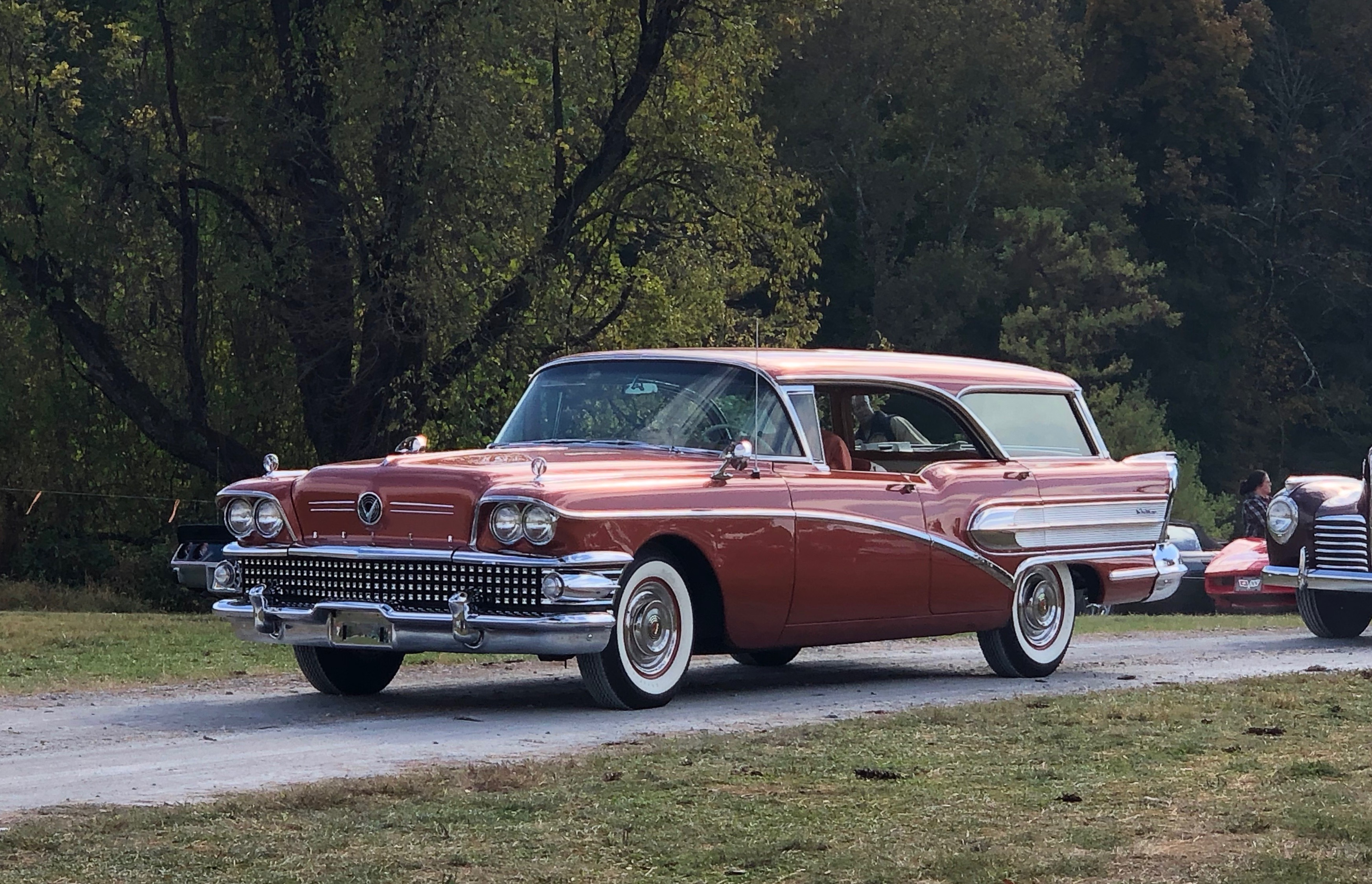
1958 Buick Century Caballero Estate hardtop station wagon

== Third generation (1973–1977) ==
Third generation
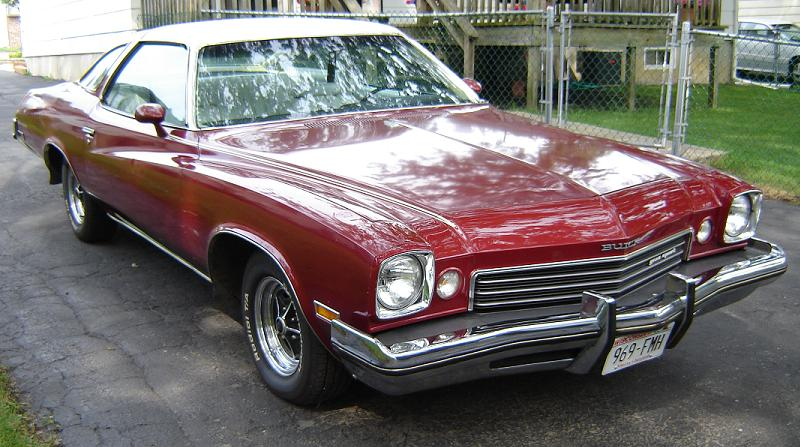
- 1973 Century Gran Sport

Overview
- Model years: 1973–1977
- Assembly: Flint, Michigan, United States (Buick City); Framingham, Massachusetts, United States (Framingham Assembly); Fremont, California, United States (Fremont Assembly)

Body and chassis
- Class: Mid-size car
- Body style: 2-door coupe 4-door sedan 4-door station wagon
- Layout: FR layout
- Platform: A-body
- Related: Oldsmobile Cutlass; Pontiac LeMans; Chevrolet Chevelle

Powertrain
- Engine: 231 cu in (3.8 L) Buick V6; 350 cu in (5.7 L) Buick V8; 455 cu in (7.5 L) Buick V8; 403 cu in (6.6 L) Oldsmobile V8
- Transmission: 3-speed manual 4-speed manual 3-speed automatic

Dimensions
- Wheelbase: 116 in (2,946 mm)
- Length: 212.4 in (5,395 mm)

The Buick Century nameplate was revived for the 1973 model year on the rear-wheel drive intermediate A-body platform, which was redesigned for this year. The name replaced Skylark for Buick's mid-sized cars. The Century Regal coupe was added at the top of the model range and later became a separate series, dropping the Century name for 1976. It was available with two- and four-barrel versions of the Buick 350, putting out 150 and 175 hp (112 and 130 kW), respectively. The 225 horsepower (168 kW) 455 was also an option. The base Century and Century 350 coupes had a fastback roof with large rear quarter glass, while the Century Luxus featured a more formal notchback roofline with narrow opera windows. The Century Estate replaced the Buick Sport Wagon.

By replacing the Skylark, the Century inherited the Gran Sport performance option. The package was available with any engine and included upgraded suspension, additional instrumentation, and unique appearance treatment. Dual exhaust increased output of the four-barrel 350 to 190 hp (142 kW). While the Stage I 455 was somewhat diminished from its performance heyday due to emission controls, output was competitive for the era at 270 hp (201 kW) and 390 lb⋅ft (529 N⋅m). A Saginaw three-speed manual was standard with either 350 engine. A Muncie M-21 four-speed was available with either 350 or with the regular 455, while the Stage I required a Turbo-Hydramatic 400.

The 1974 Buick Century and Regal were introduced with HEI (High-Energy Ignition systems) instead of points and ignition coil. The 1974 Buick Century Gran Sport was still, "Available only as a Hardtop Colonnade Coupe, it carries the Rallye ride and handling suspension with stabilizer bars, front and rear. Plus a specialized blacked-out grille and head lamp doors, an accent stripe on the rear deck, special tail lamps and Gran Sport grille ornamentation. And if you go for the Gran Sport, you can add the Stage 1, the high performance engine."

For 1975, the Luxus was renamed Century Custom. The new 110 hp (82 kW) 231 V6 was installed as standard equipment along with a three-speed manual transmission on coupes and sedans, and the big-block 455 was no longer available. The four-barrel 350 V8 became standard on station wagons. A new landau top became available for fastback coupes that partially covered the rear quarter glass, giving an appearance similar to the formal-roof Century Custom. A Century Special coupe was added to the lineup, using the fastback roofline. The Special was marketed as an economy variant of the Century and was only available with the V6 engine.

In 1975, the US government legalized rectangular headlights and Buick added them to the Century for the 1976 model year, positioned side-by-side on coupes, and stacked vertically on sedans. Sedans received a taller, more-formal grille, while coupes got an angled, body-colored front end along with new bodyside sheet metal that lacked the traditional "sweepspear". The Gran Sport option was discontinued with the 455 engines and only 231 V6 or 350 V8 were available on the last 1,288 made vehicles merely with appearance and suspension option package.

Buick Centuries were used in the 1975 and 1976 Indianapolis Motor Speedway as pace cars. Buick introduced a 1975 Buick Century "Free Spirit" edition replica based on the Indy Pace Car for the public with patriotic graphic decals and the Buick Hawk on the hood. This 1975 vehicle had a transmission shifter on the floor with bucket seats and "Hurst Hatch" T-tops installed. The white exterior and blue/white interior were based on the 1975 two-door sheet metal. The engine was a 350 V8, as opposed to the 455 V8 used on the actual Indy 500 Pace Car. Alternatively, in 1976, Buick introduced the "Free Spirit" edition of the Indy Pace Car; it was received the 1976 Century Special's facelifted sheet metal with the 231 V6 engine. The original Indy Pace Car had the turbocharged 231 V6. The replica featured a silver, black, and red paint with a black interior. The vehicle included a positive-traction differential.

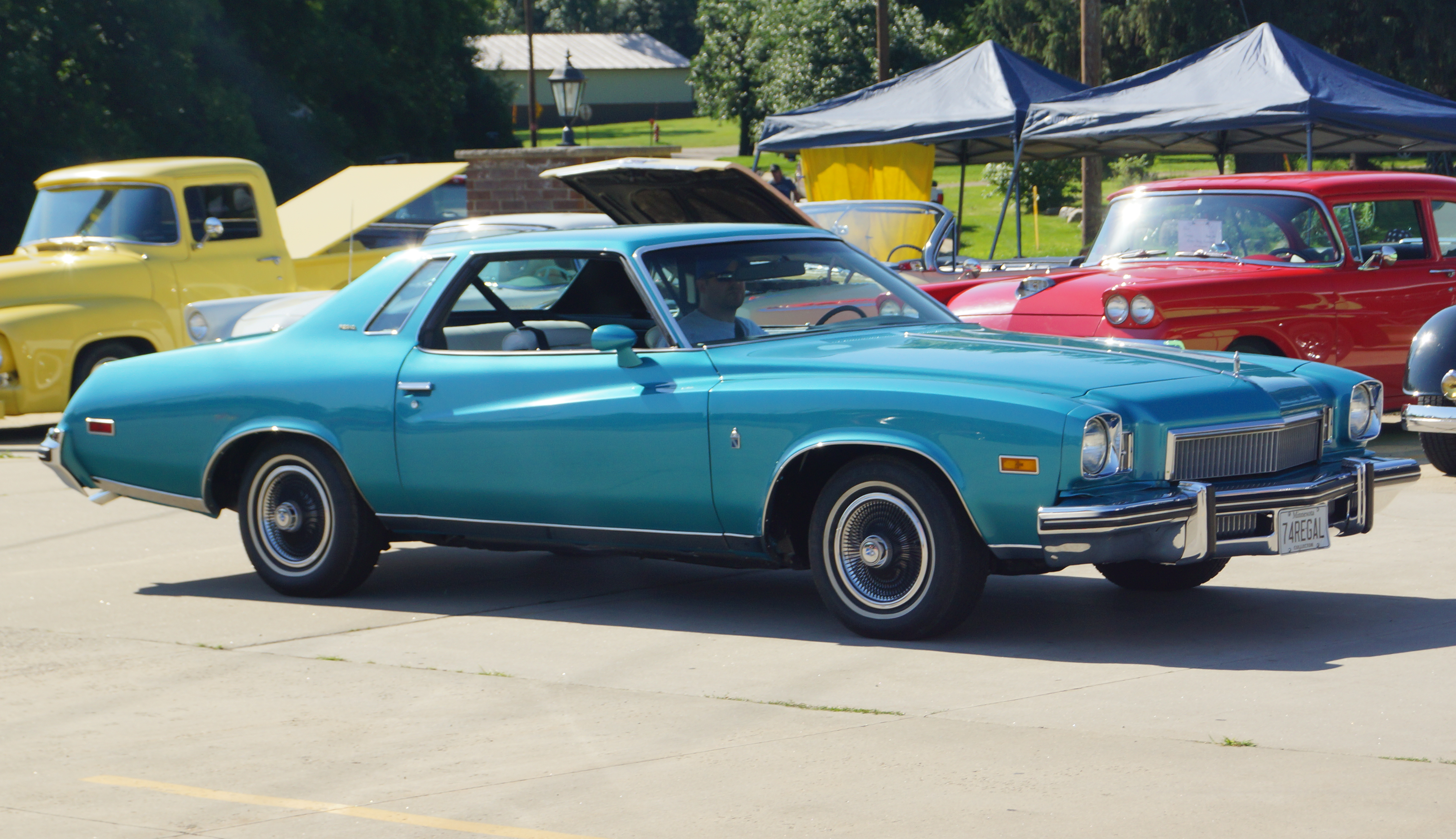
1974 Buick Regal coupe

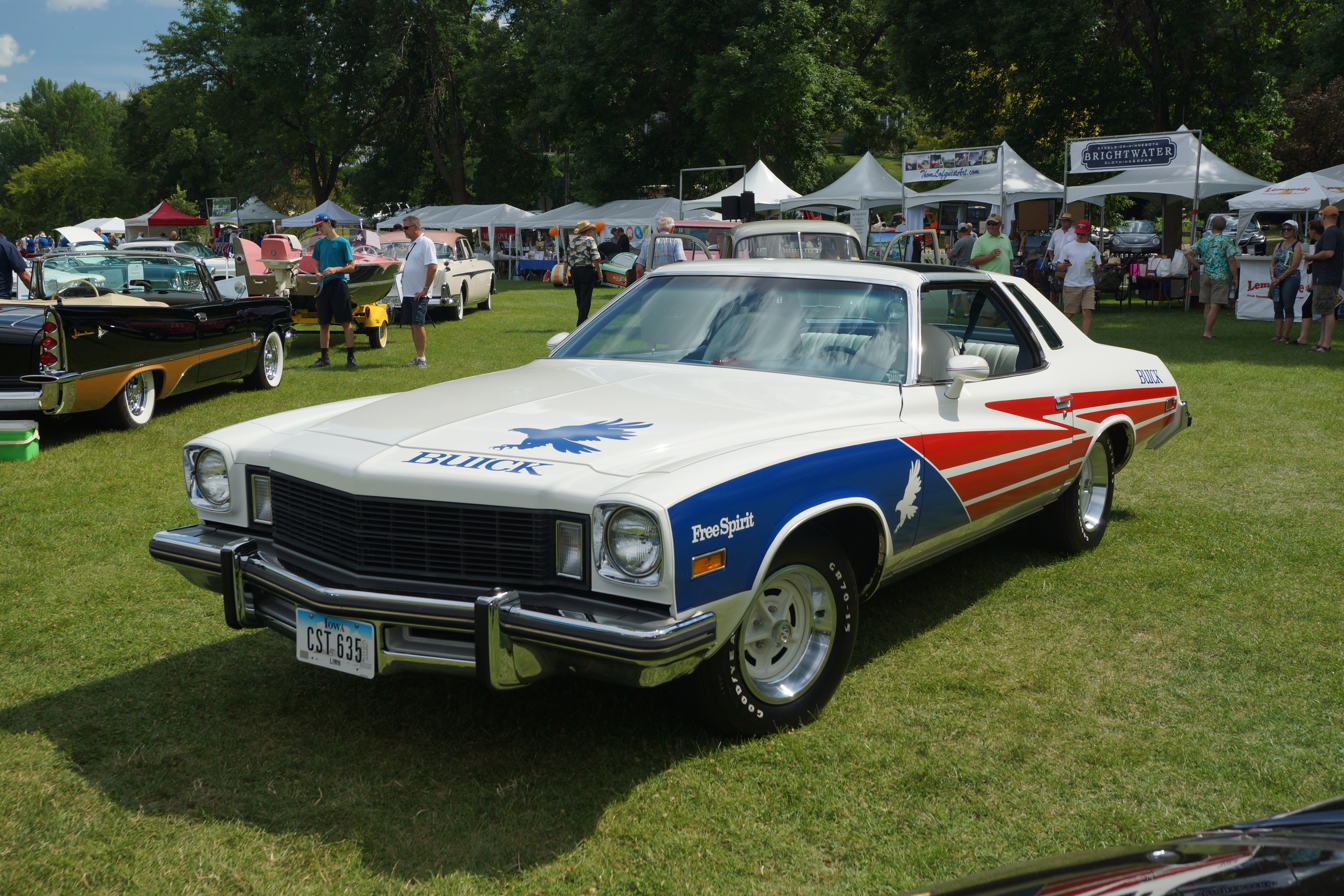
1975 Buick Century "Free Spirit" Indy 500 Pace Car replica; one of 1813 made.

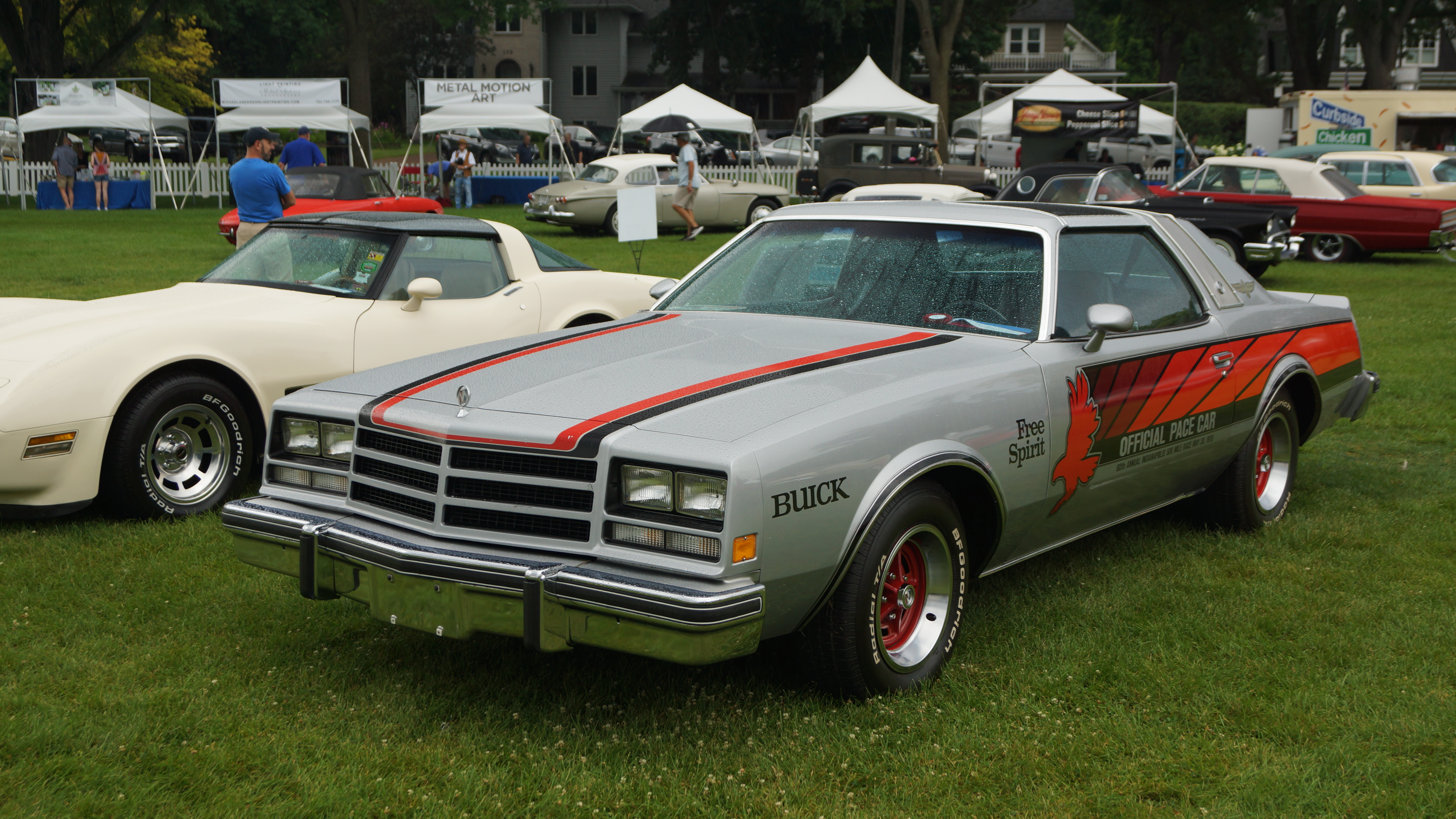
1976 Buick Century "Free Spirit" Indy 500 Pace Car replica; one of 1290 made.

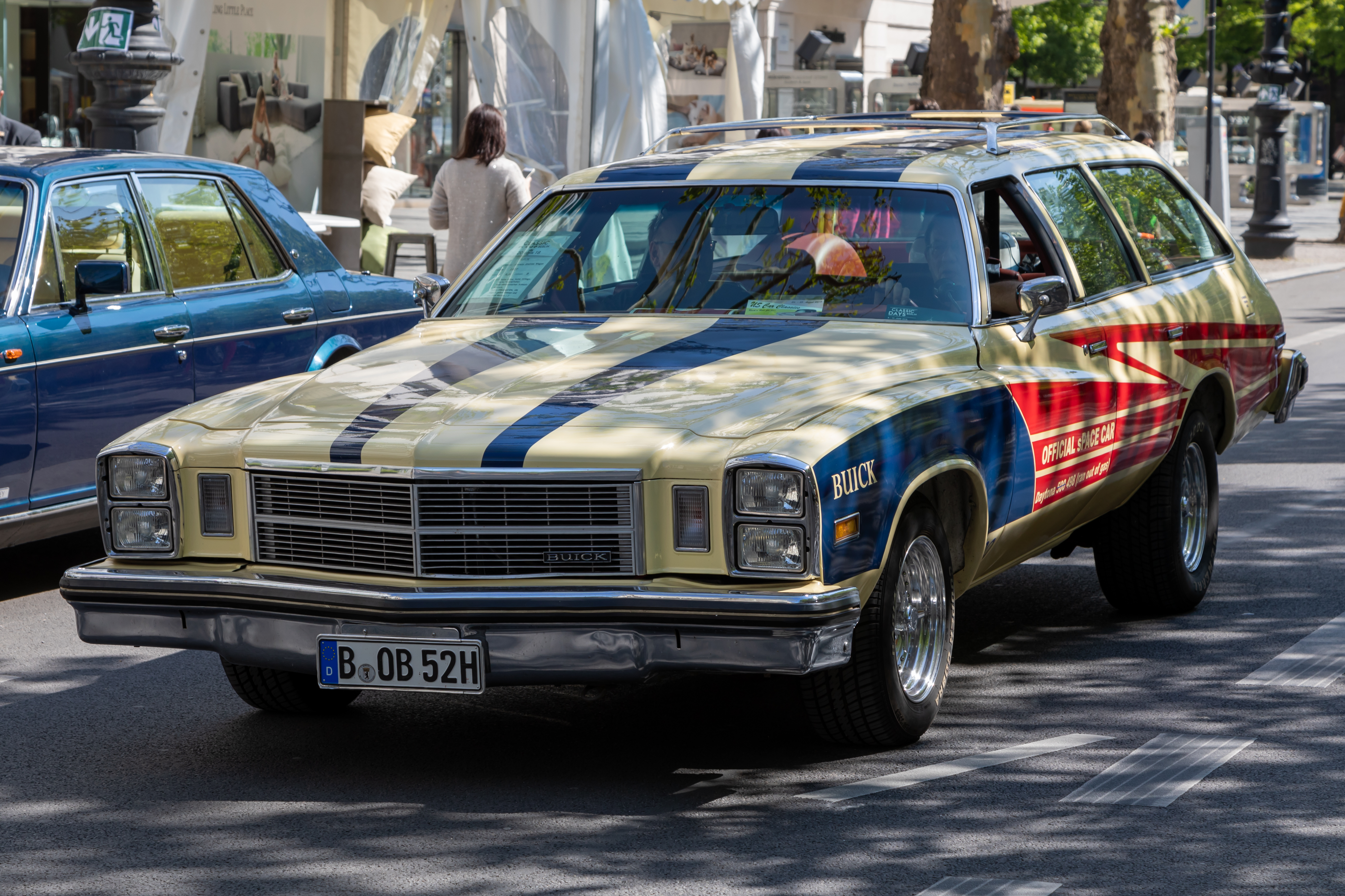
1976 Buick Century Estate station wagon in faux Indy Car livery

To commemorate the Bicentennial of the United States, the standard colors available on all Buicks were Judicial Black, Liberty White, Pewter Gray, Potomac Blue, Continental Blue, Concord Green, Constitution Green, Mount Vernon Cream, Buckskin Tan, Musket Brown, Boston Red and Independence Red, with specially available colors on select models Congressional Cream, Revere Red, Colonial Yellow and Firecracker Orange.

In 1977, the V6 engine was revised to be even-firing, and a 403 cu in (6.6 L) Oldsmobile V8 was added as an option for station wagons.

Production Figures:

Buick Century Production Figures (Gran Sport and Free Spirit are included in Coupe counts, Regal production is included in annual totals):
	Coupe	Sedan	Wagon	Gran Sport	Free Spirit	Regal Coupe	Regal Sedan	Yearly Total
1973	127,866	60,640	18,405	6,637	—	91,557	—	298,468
1974	78,096	34,015	11,651	3,355	—	57,512	9,333	190,607
1975	72,522	32,070	11,494	1,288	1,813	56,646	10,726	183,458
1976	93,484	53,360	16,625	—	1,290	124,498	17,118	305,085
1977	73,698	42,710	19,282	—	—	174,560	17,946	328,196
Total	445,666	222,795	77,457	11,280	3,103	504,773	55,123	1,305,814

== Fourth generation (1978–1981) ==
Fourth generation
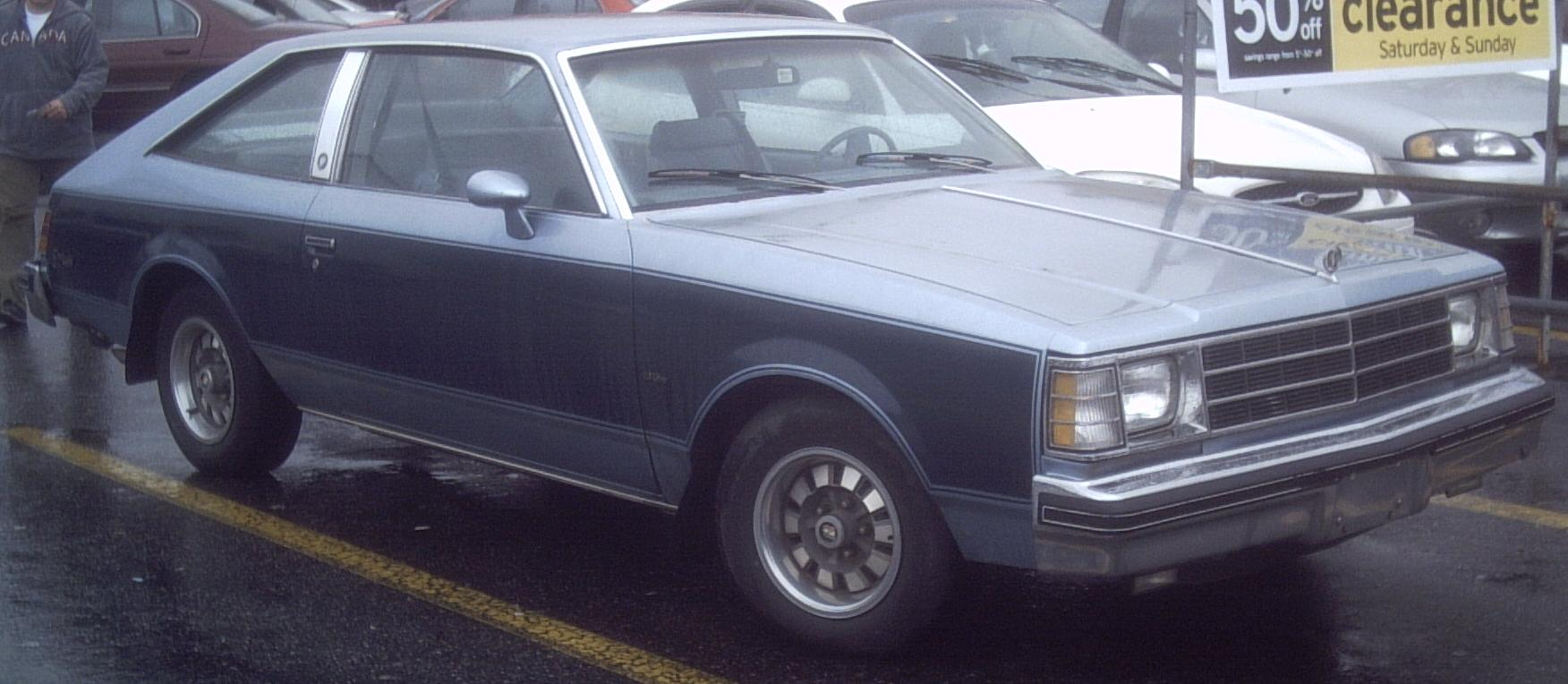

Overview
- Model years: 1978–1981
- Assembly: Flint, Michigan, United States (Buick City); Framingham, Massachusetts, United States (Framingham Assembly); Fremont, California, United States (Fremont Assembly)

Body and chassis
- Class: Mid-size car
- Body style: 2-door fastback coupe 4-door fastback sedan 4-door sedan 4-door station wagon
- Layout: FR layout
- Platform: A-body
- Related: Buick Regal; Oldsmobile Cutlass; Pontiac Bonneville; Pontiac Grand Am; Pontiac Grand Prix; Pontiac Lemans; Chevrolet El Camino; Chevrolet Malibu; Chevrolet Monte Carlo; GMC Caballero

Powertrain
- Engine: 196 cu in (3.2 L) Buick V6; 231 cu in (3.8 L) Buick V6; 265 cu in (4.3 L) Pontiac V8; 301 cu in (4.9 L) Pontiac V8; 350 cu in (5.7 L) Oldsmobile diesel V8
- Transmission: 3-speed THM200, 250, 350 automatic 3-speed manual 4-speed Saginaw manual

Dimensions
- Wheelbase: 108.1 in (2,746 mm)
- Length: 196 in (4,978 mm)
- Curb weight: 3130-3425 lb

GM downsized its intermediate line, reducing wheelbase by 4 in (102 mm) and curb weight by nearly half a ton. The Century was initially offered as an "aeroback" fastback two-door coupe and a fastback four-door sedan along with a station wagon model (sharing bodies with the Oldsmobile Cutlass Salon). The car was over a foot shorter, several inches narrower, and several hundred pounds lighter than its predecessor. Big-block engines were discontinued and the new base powerplant was Buick's new 196 cu in (3.2 L) V6 introduced specifically for the Century and Regal. The 231 cu in (3.8 L) V6 and the Chevrolet 305 V8 were options. The Pontiac 265 cu in (4.3 L) and 301 cu in (4.9 L) replaced the Chevrolet engine for 1979.

One of the more rare models of this time was the 1979 to 1980 Century Turbo Coupe, powered by a turbocharged version of the 3.8 L V6, which offered V8-like performance with more reasonable fuel consumption and reduced emissions. The Turbo Coupe was not nearly as popular as the similar Regal Turbo Sport Coupe of the time, and total production is estimated to be less than 2,500.

The two fastback models (along with the Oldsmobile Cutlass Salon) proved unpopular. For 1980, the fastback four-door sedan was dropped in favor of a conventional notchback four-door sedan. After 1980, the Century fastback coupe was discontinued. With the introduction of the new front-wheel drive Century in 1982, the existing notchback sedan and wagon models were transferred to the Regal line.

Production Figures:

Buick Century Production Figures:
	Coupe	Sedan	Wagon	Turbo Coupe	Yearly Total
1978	23,252	30,894	33,600	N/A	87,746
1979	5,626	17,045	31,513	1,653	55,837
1980	N/A	129,740	17,615	1,074	148,429
1981	N/A	127,119	17,148	N/A	144,267
Total	28,878	304,798	99,876	2,727	436,279

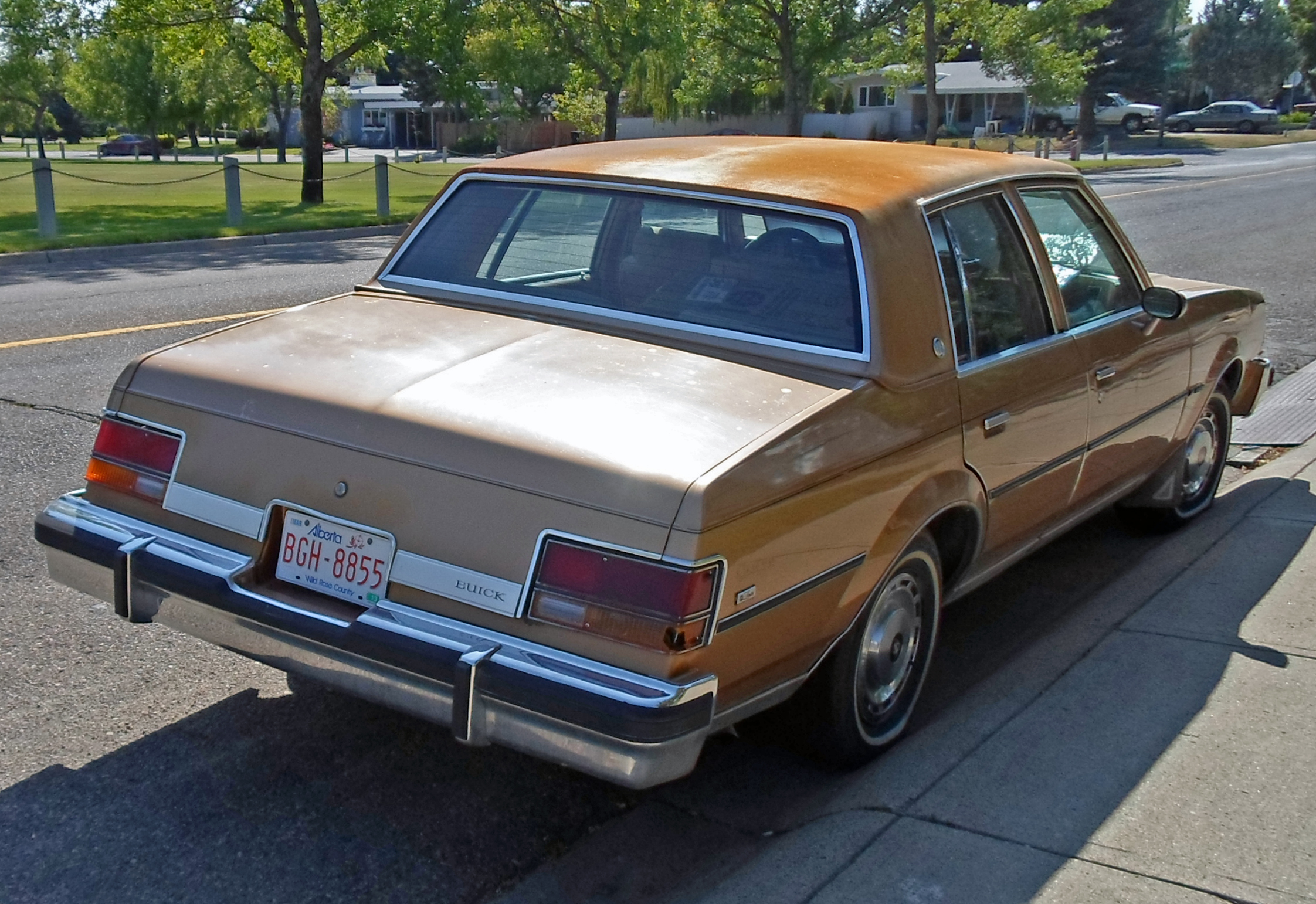
1980 Buick Century four-door sedan, rear view

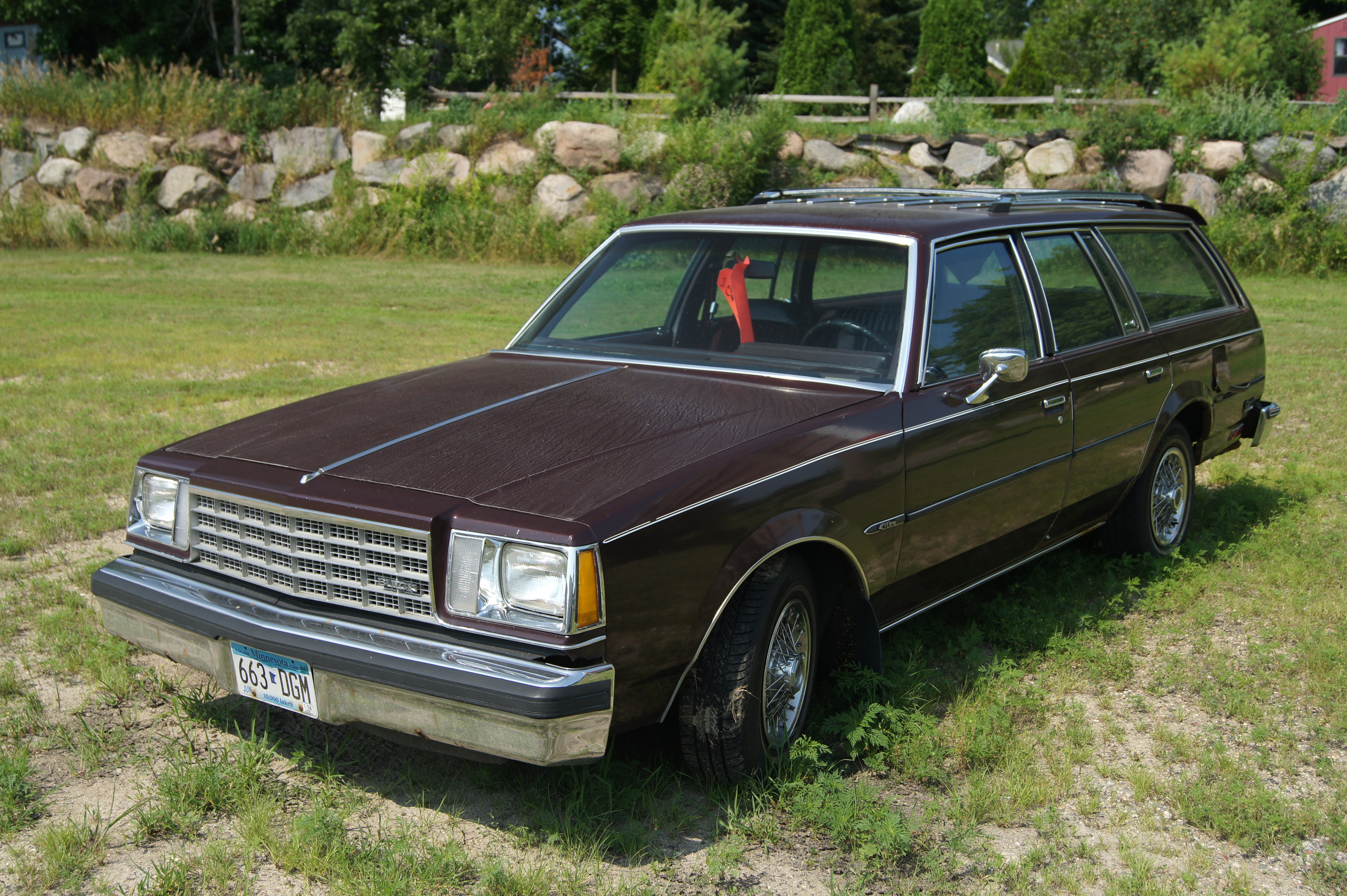
1980 Buick Century Estate Wagon

== Fifth generation (1982–1996) ==
Fifth generation
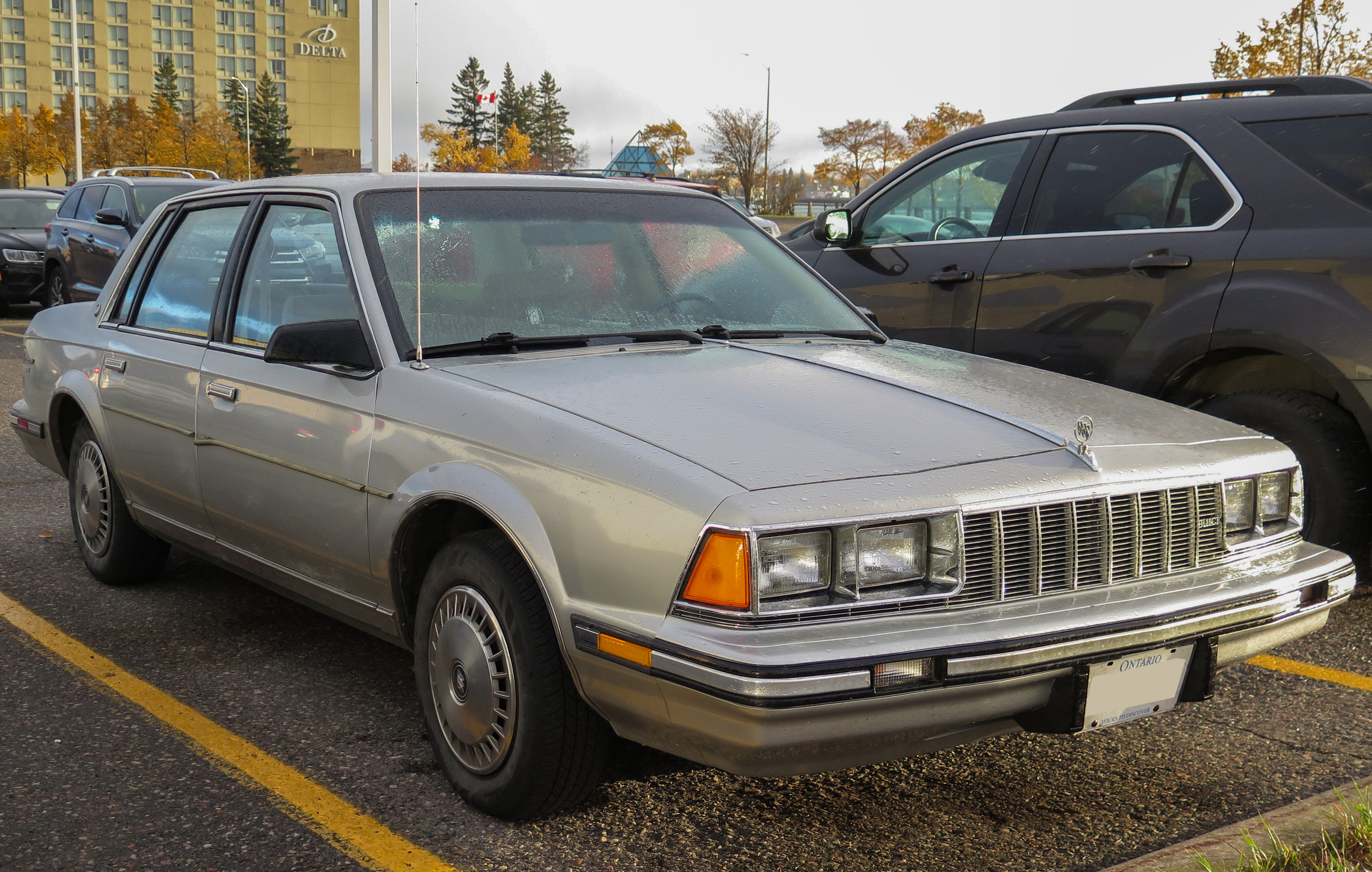
- 1984 Century Limited Sedan

Overview
- Also called: Chevrolet Century (Venezuela); Buick Regal (Japan); GM Century Limited (México)
- Model years: 1982–1996; 1984–1996 (Mexico)
- Assembly: Oklahoma City, Oklahoma, United States (1982–1996); Doraville, Georgia, United States (1982–1987); Framingham, Massachusetts, United States (1989); North Tarrytown, New York, United States (1985–1989); Ramos Arizpe, Mexico (1989–1994); Valencia, Venezuela

Body and chassis
- Class: Mid-size car
- Body style: 2-door coupe (1982–1993); 4-door sedan (1982–1996); 4-door station wagon (1984–1996)
- Layout: Transverse front-engine, front-wheel drive
- Platform: A-body
- Related: Chevrolet Celebrity; Oldsmobile Cutlass Ciera; Pontiac 6000

Powertrain
- Engine: 2.2 L LN2 I4; 2.5 L Tech IV I4; 2.8 L LE2/LB6 V6; 3.0 L Buick V6; 3.1 L L82 V6; 3.3 L LG7 V6; 3.8 L LG3 V6; 4.3 L LT7 diesel V6
- Transmission: GM TH-125C 3-speed automatic; GM 440-T4 4-speed automatic; GM 4T60-E 4-speed automatic

Dimensions
- Wheelbase: 104.8 in (2,662 mm) (1982–1990); 104.9 in (2,664 mm) (1991–96)
- Length: 189.1 in (4,803 mm) (sedan & coupe); 190.9 in (4,849 mm); (wagon)
- Width: 69.4 in (1,763 mm)
- Height: 53.7 in (1,364 mm) (sedan & coupe); 54.1 in (1,374 mm) (wagon)

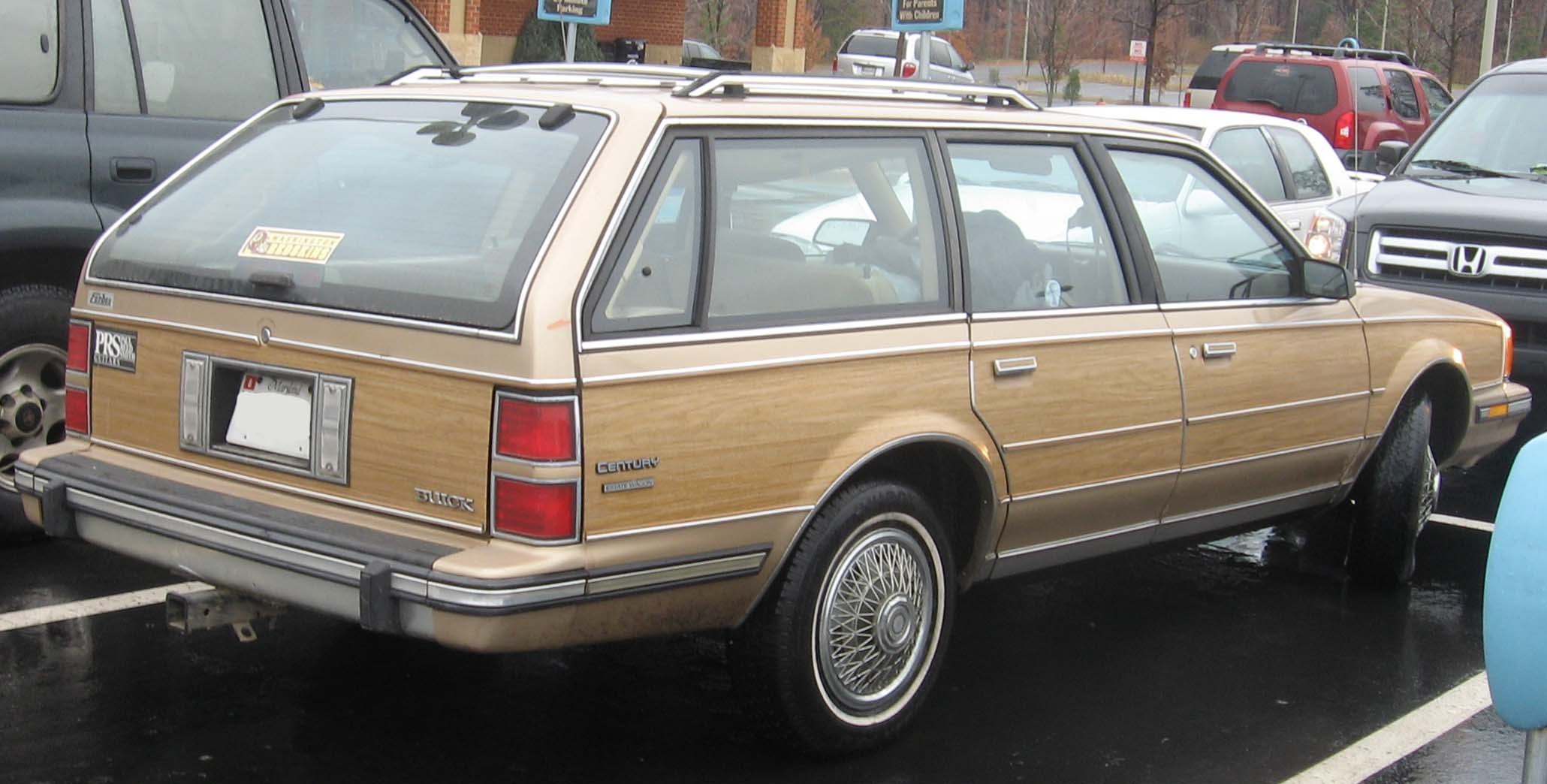
1986–1988 Buick Century Estate Wagon

In January 1982, GM debuted the downsized fifth-generation Century, using the front-wheel drive A platform, in coupe and sedan forms.

The fifth-generation Century shared the A platform with the Cutlass Ciera, Pontiac 6000 and Chevrolet Celebrity. Together the A-bodies became some of GM's most transparent examples of badge engineering, which was highlighted on the cover of the August 22, 1983 issue of Fortune magazine as examples of near-uniformity, embarrassing the company and prompting GM to recommit to design leadership.

In October 1983, a station wagon was added to the lineup to replace the discontinued Regal wagon. The 1984 model year also had an Olympic version of the Buick Century, commemorating the 1984 games in Los Angeles, California. In 1985, all 1986 versions were "freshened" with a new, more angular front fascia. Wheelbase was 104.9 in (2,664 mm), with 189 in (4,801 mm) overall length. Both four-cylinder gasoline units and diesel V6 engines were offered in this generation, although neither became popular. Performance versions of several Buick models, including the Century coupe, were marketed in the mid-1980s under the T-Type name. With Buick's 181 cu in (3.0 L) V6 producing 110 hp (82 kW), the Century T-Type's performance was modest, but the Buick 3.8 V6 SFI engine, producing 140–150 hp (104–112 kW), offered passable performance in this comparatively lightweight vehicle.

For 1985 and 1986, Hess & Eisenhardt/Car Craft of Lima, Ohio converted 124 finished Buick Century coupes into coachbuilt convertibles. Although these convertibles were sold as new cars through Buick dealerships, these conversions were not factory authorized. In 1986, the engine distributor was replaced by a coil-pack ignition system that proved to be far more reliable than the system that it replaced. The "Chevrolet Century" were sold in South America and the Caribbean. In Mexico, it was sold as the Century Limited (with no brand, although it wears the Buick logos). Introduced for 1984, it was the top model for General Motors Mexico, and it survived the import car wave from 1991 (previously new car importations were forbidden in Mexico) and continued in production until the 1996 model year. In Japan it was sold as the Buick Regal because of the Toyota Century limousine.

=== 1989 facelift ===
The Century received a facelift in late 1988 for the 1989 model year, gaining a new more-rounded roofline, but continuing on the A-body platform. Black plastic inserts with the Buick tri-shield emblem replaced the rear quarter windows. The front end received flush headlamps and a rounded grille, and the stand-up hood ornament was now standard. All sedan models were easily distinguished by their full-width taillights that followed a Buick tradition of big taillights. The 3300 was introduced in 1989 as a replacement for the 3800 cc engine, offering an increase of 10 horsepower, but a loss of 15 lb-ft of torque. The smaller engine featured multiport fuel injection, waste spark distributor-less ignition controlled by the ECM after startup, but had no balance shaft. An interior refresh came in 1989 for 1990 models.

The 1989 model had seatbelts mounted on the b-pillar, for 1990-1996 the seatbelts were mounted on the door. From 1989 to 1992, the Century had a black bumper and side trim, and from 1993 to 1996 the Century had a bodycolored trim.

Originally, the Century, as with the rest of the A-body range, was intended to be phased out in 1990 in favor of the more modern W-body line of midsized cars. However, the Century (and its sister car, the Oldsmobile Cutlass Ciera) continued to remain popular nearing the intended end of their production runs. Thus, it was decided that the older Century and Cutlass Ciera would instead continue production as lower priced alternatives to their proposed replacements, the Regal and Cutlass Supreme respectively.

=== 1991 facelift ===
For the 1991 model year, the Century received another slight facelift featuring a bigger radiator grille and different headlamps. The interior featured new door panels with the window switches and door lock switches relocated to a more convenient configuration found on more modern cars, where the switch location corresponds with the window location in the car body. This feature never appeared on its sibling the Oldsmobile Ciera, which retained the inline switch bank mounted flush with the door panel, the rear switch being the driver's door window. The Century windows switches were not backlit, but illuminated by a small bulb in the door panel trim above the switch bank. Other interior changes included new seat covers, and relocating the front outboard seat belts from the A-pillar into the door, functioning as "automatic" seat belts so that the belts could be buckled and the door opened and closed while still buckled. The driver and front passenger could enter and exit the vehicle while the seat belt was still fastened.

For 1993, the 2.5 L inline-four was replaced with a new, 115 hp (86 kW), 2.2-liter four. For 1994, the slow-selling coupe model was dropped (603 had been sold for 1993, equivalent to 0.5% of overall Century sales), and all models received a standard driver's-side airbag. Also in 1993, the 160 hp (119 kW) 3.3 L Buick V6 was replaced with a 3.1 L V6 with the same power rating, and power on the 2.2 L four was up to 120 hp (89 kW) with the introduction of MFI. Midway through the 1994 model year, a round speedometer replaced the wide rectangular one, but the car still carried on with the original dash.

Despite its dated design, the Century and its sibling the Oldsmobile Cutlass Ciera still sold well during the 1990s and proved both reliable and profitable to GM since their tooling costs had been monetized.

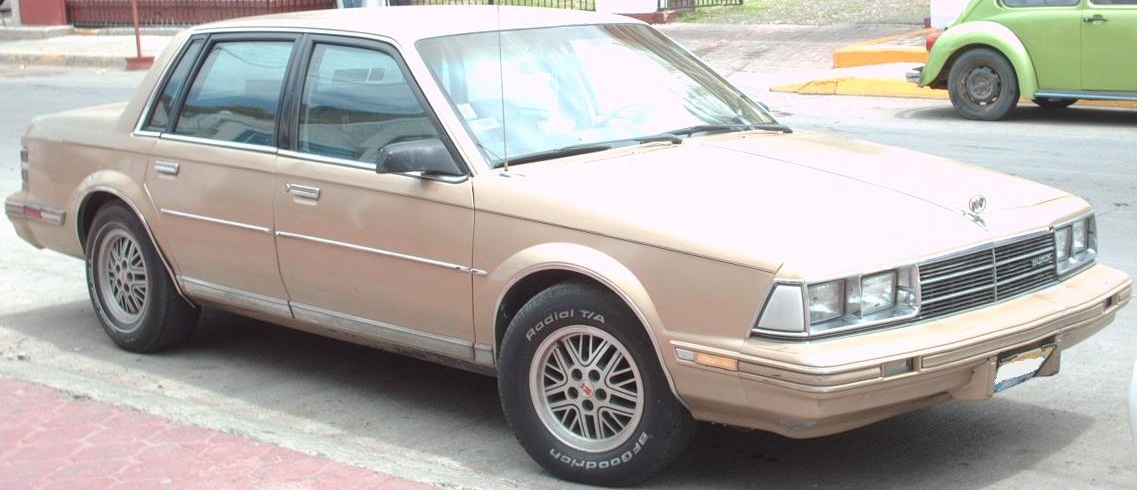
1982 Buick Century sedan

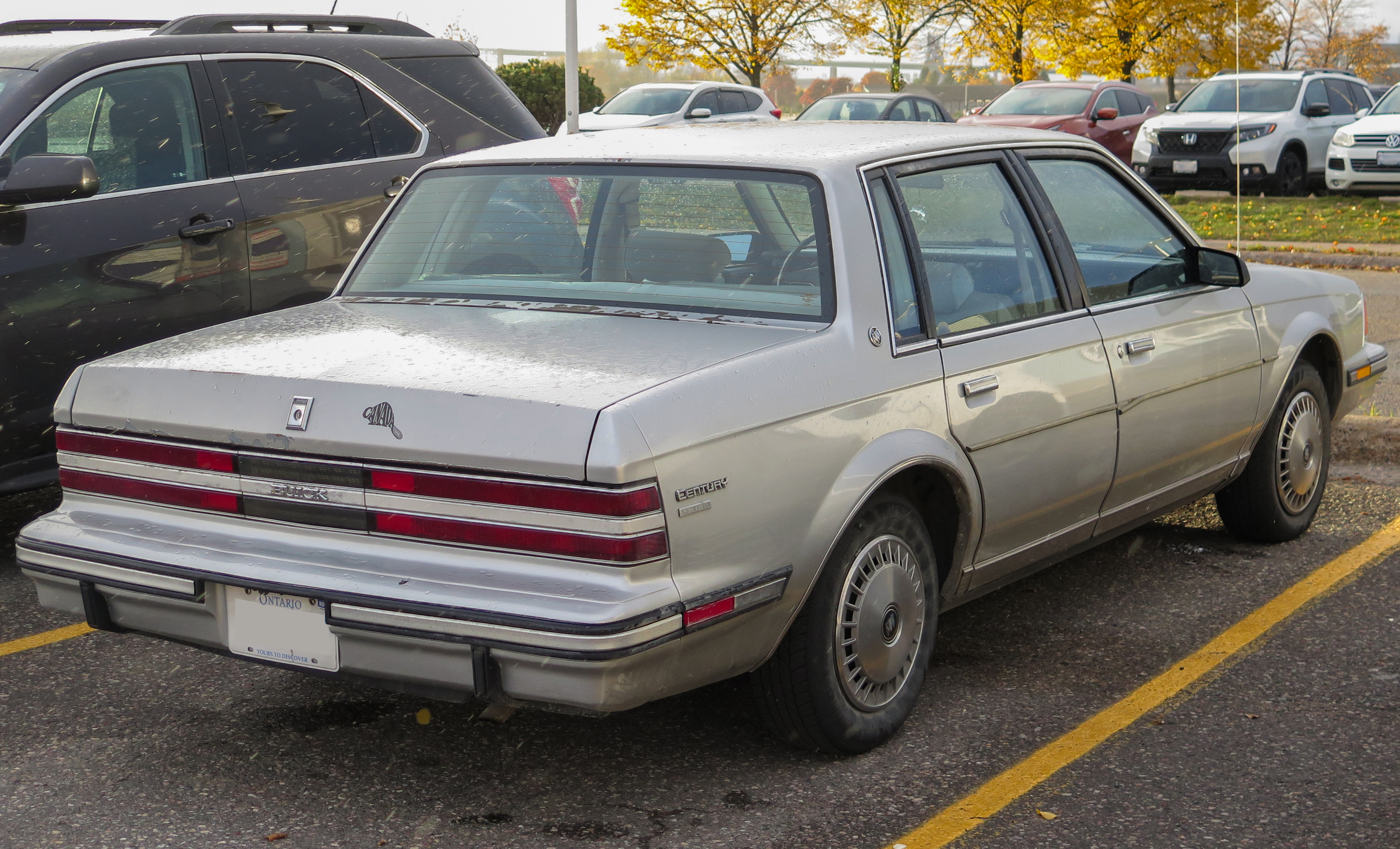
1984 Buick Century Limited Sedan, rear view

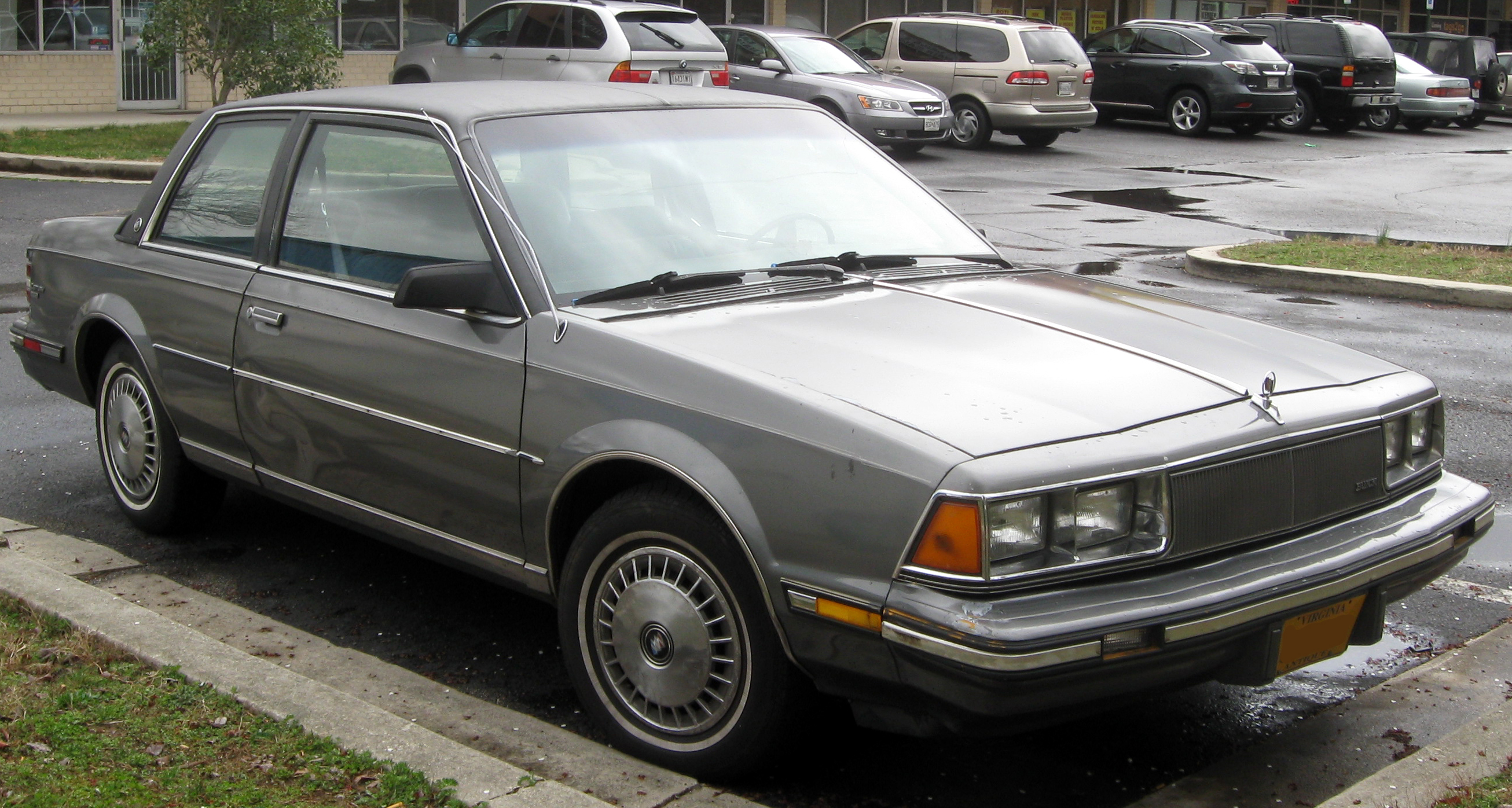
1985 Buick Century coupe

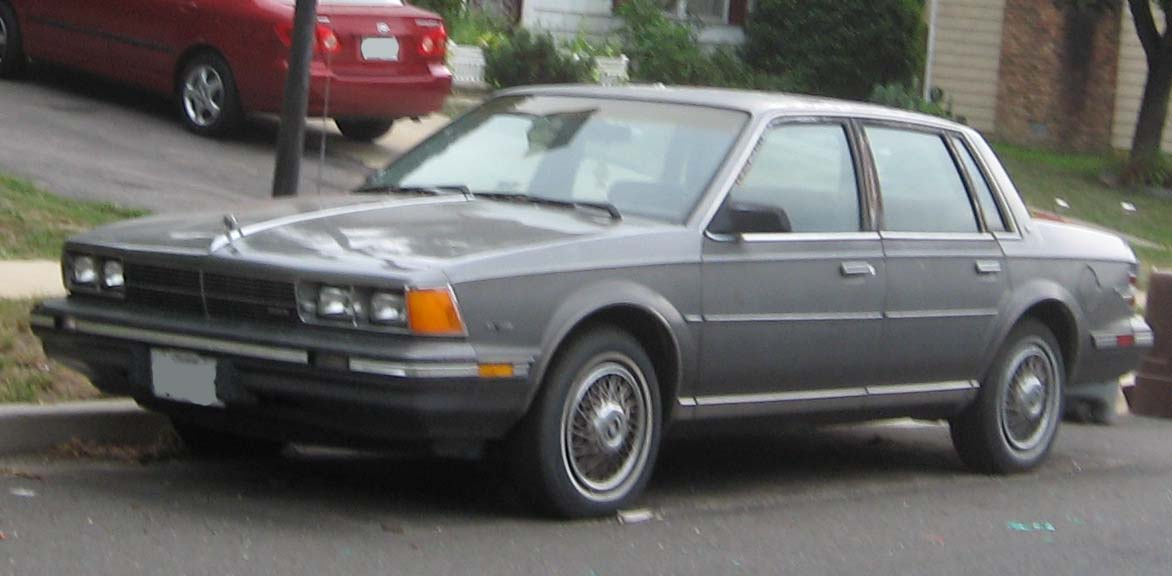
1986–1988 Buick Century sedan

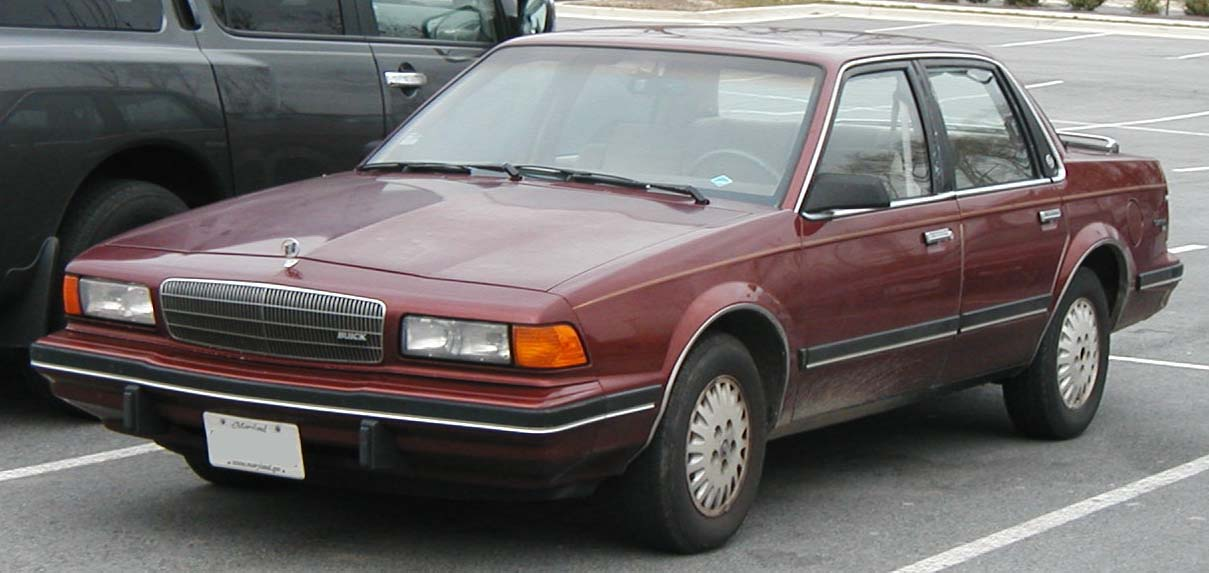
1989–1990 Buick Century sedan

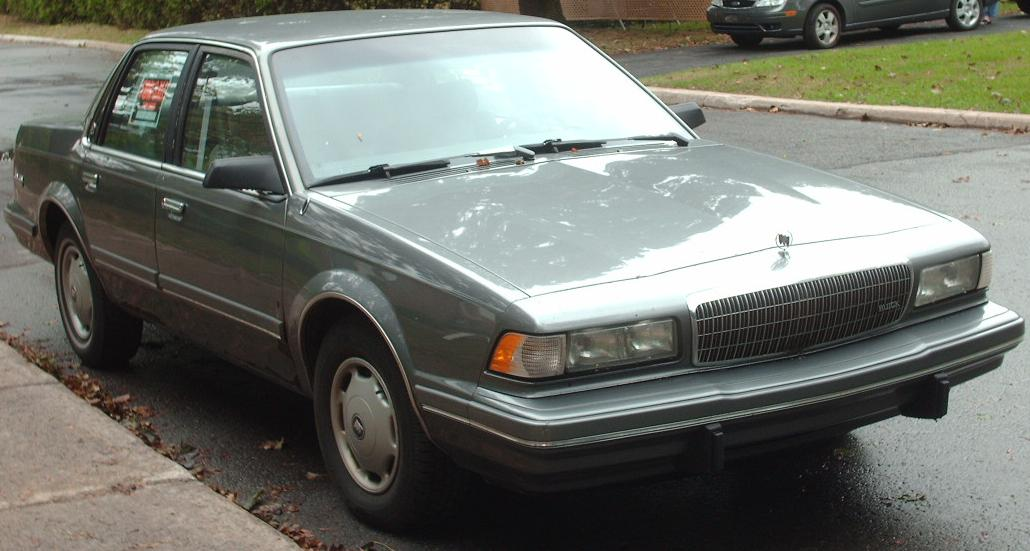
1991–1993 Buick Century sedan

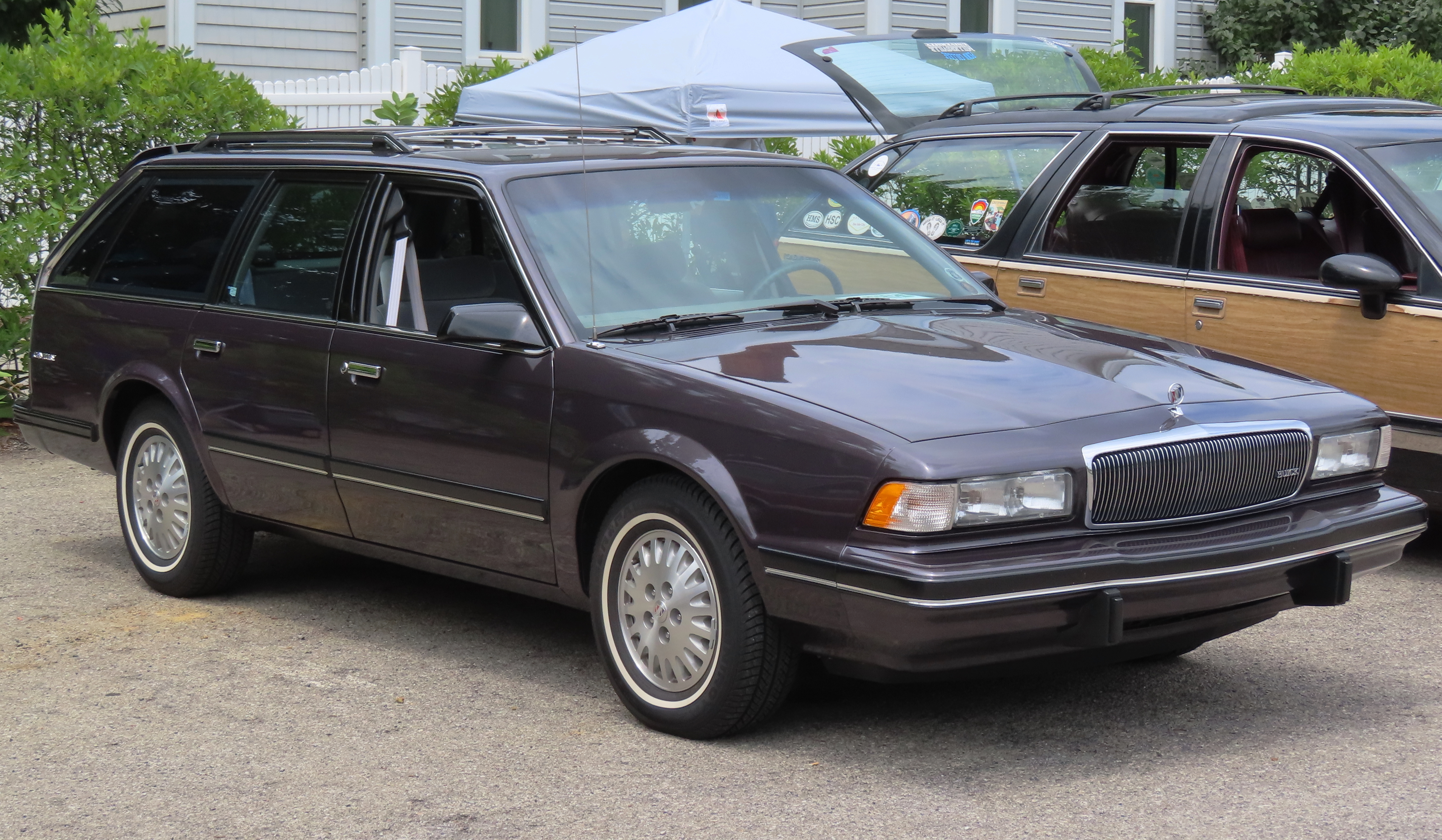
1994 Buick Century Special wagon

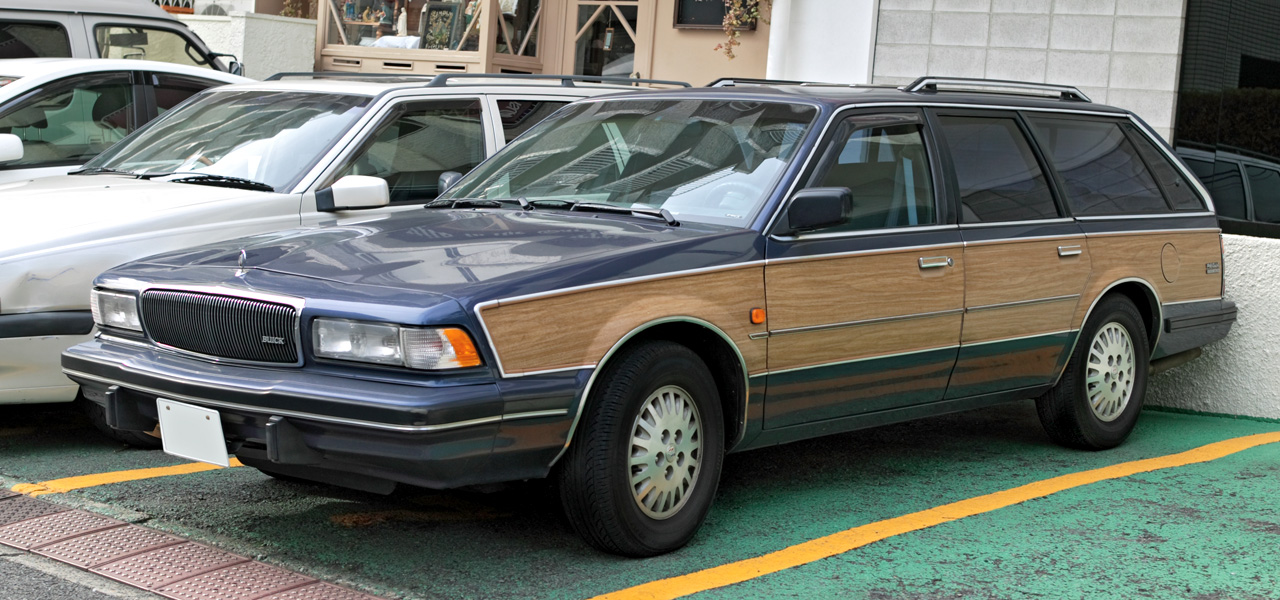
Japanese market 1994–1996 Buick Regal wagon (Toyota was already using the Century modelname)

Production

Buick Century Production Figures
	Coupe	Sedan	Wagon	Yearly Total
1982	19,715	83,250	-	102,965
1983	13,483	114,443	-	127,926
1984	15,429	178,454	25,975	219,858
1985	13,043	215,928	28,221	257,192
1986	14,781	229,066	25,374	269,221
1987	7,262	159,785	17,404	184,451
1988	2,449	101,351	9,458	113,258
1989	6,953	139,120	9,419	155,492
1990	1,944	123,557	7,220	132,721
1991	1,600	102,435	6,500	110,535
1992	627	111,819	6,041	118,487
1993	603	110,795	9,163	120,561
1994	-	122,326	8,364	130,690
1995	-	102,773	7,498	110,271
1996	-	85,625	6,843	92,468
Total	97,889	1,980,727	167,480	2,246,096

=== Engines ===
Years	Engine	Power	Torque	Notes
1982–1988	2.5 L (151 cu in) Tech IV TBI I4	90 hp (67 kW)	134 lb⋅ft (182 N⋅m)	Also with 92 hp
1989–1992	2.5 L (151 cu in) Tech IV I4	110 hp (82 kW)	135 lb⋅ft (183 N⋅m)	
1993	2.2 L (134 cu in) LN2 I4	110 hp (82 kW)	130 lb⋅ft (176 N⋅m)	
1994–1996	2.2 L (134 cu in) LN2 I4	120 hp (89 kW)	130 lb⋅ft (176 N⋅m)	
1982–1985	3.0 L (181 cu in) LK9 V6	110 hp (82 kW)	145 lb⋅ft (197 N⋅m)	
1986*	2.8 L (173 cu in) LE2 V6	112 hp (84 kW)	145 lb⋅ft (197 N⋅m)	
1987–1988	2.8 L (173 cu in) LB6 V6	125 hp (93 kW)	160 lb⋅ft (217 N⋅m)	
1989–1993	3.3 L (204 cu in) LG7 V6	160 hp (119 kW)	185 lb⋅ft (251 N⋅m)	
1994–1996	3.1 L (191 cu in) L82 MFI/SFI V6	160 hp (119 kW)	185 lb⋅ft (251 N⋅m)	
1984–1985	3.8 L (231 cu in) LG3 V6	125 hp (93 kW)	195 lb⋅ft (264 N⋅m)	MFI
1986–1988	3.8 L (231 cu in) LG3 V6	150 hp (112 kW)	200 lb⋅ft (271 N⋅m)	SFI
1982–1985	4.3 L (262 cu in) LT7 Diesel V6	85 hp (63 kW)	165 lb⋅ft (224 N⋅m)	

- - Buick Centurys sold in Canadian market had the 2.8-liter LE2 V6 available from 1982-1986.

== Sixth generation (1997–2005) ==
Sixth generation
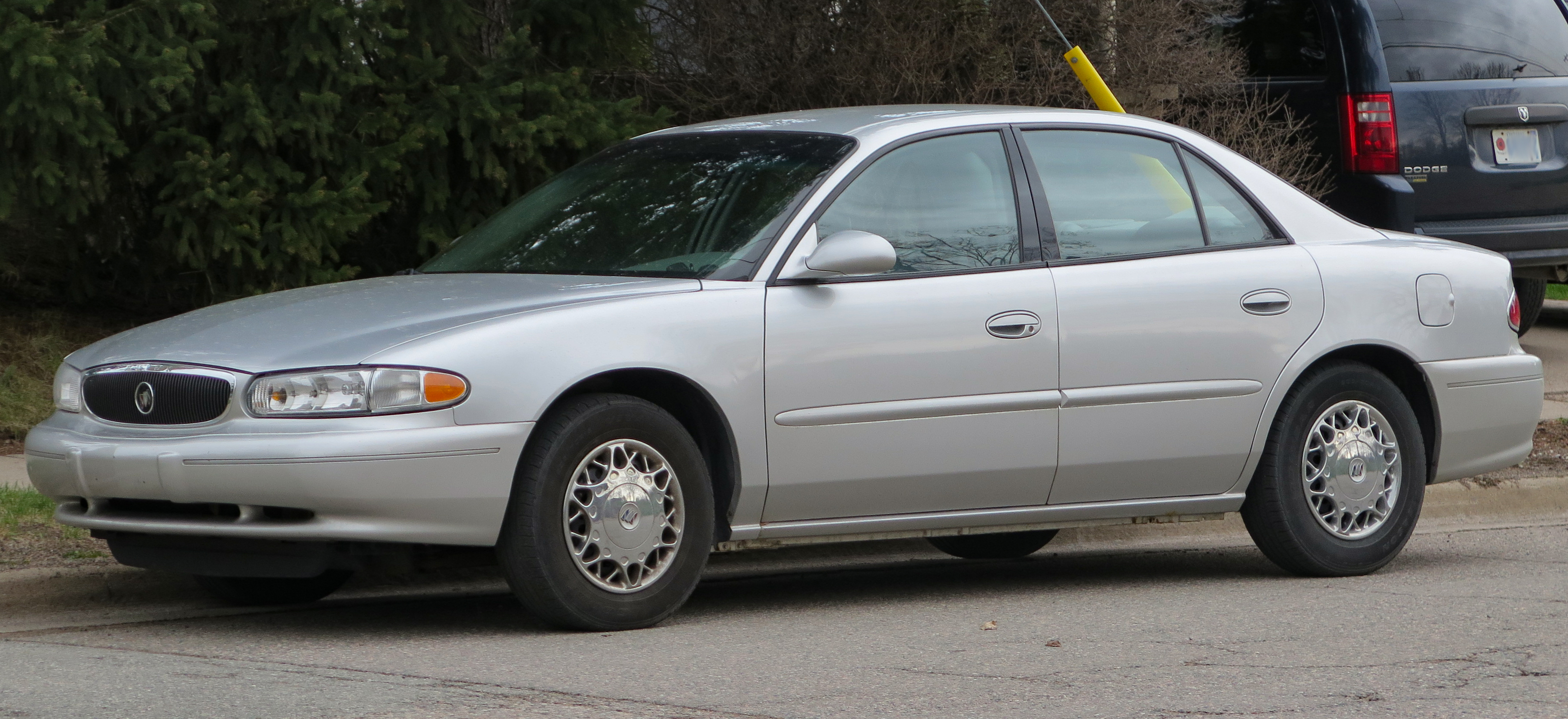
- 2003 Buick Century Limited

Overview
- Also called: Buick New Century (China)
- Production: 1996–October 2004; 1998–2000 (China)
- Model years: 1997–2005
- Assembly: Canada: Oshawa, Ontario (GM Canada Oshawa Car Assembly); China: Shanghai, Shanghai GM
- Designer: Wayne Cherry (chief: 1993); Wayne Kady (1993)

Body and chassis
- Class: Mid-size car
- Body style: 4-door sedan
- Layout: Transverse front-engine, front-wheel drive
- Platform: W-body 2nd Gen
- Related: Buick Regal; Oldsmobile Intrigue; Pontiac Grand Prix; Chevrolet Impala; Chevrolet Monte Carlo

Powertrain
- Engine: China; 2.0 L L34 I4; 2.5 L LB8 V6; 3.0 L LW9 V6; North America; 3.1 L L82/LG8 V6
- Transmission: 5-speed manual (2.0 L only); 4-speed 4T60-E automatic; 4-speed 4T65-E automatic

Dimensions
- Wheelbase: 109.0 in (2,769 mm)
- Length: 194.6 in (4,943 mm)
- Width: 72.7 in (1,847 mm)
- Height: 56.6 in (1,438 mm)

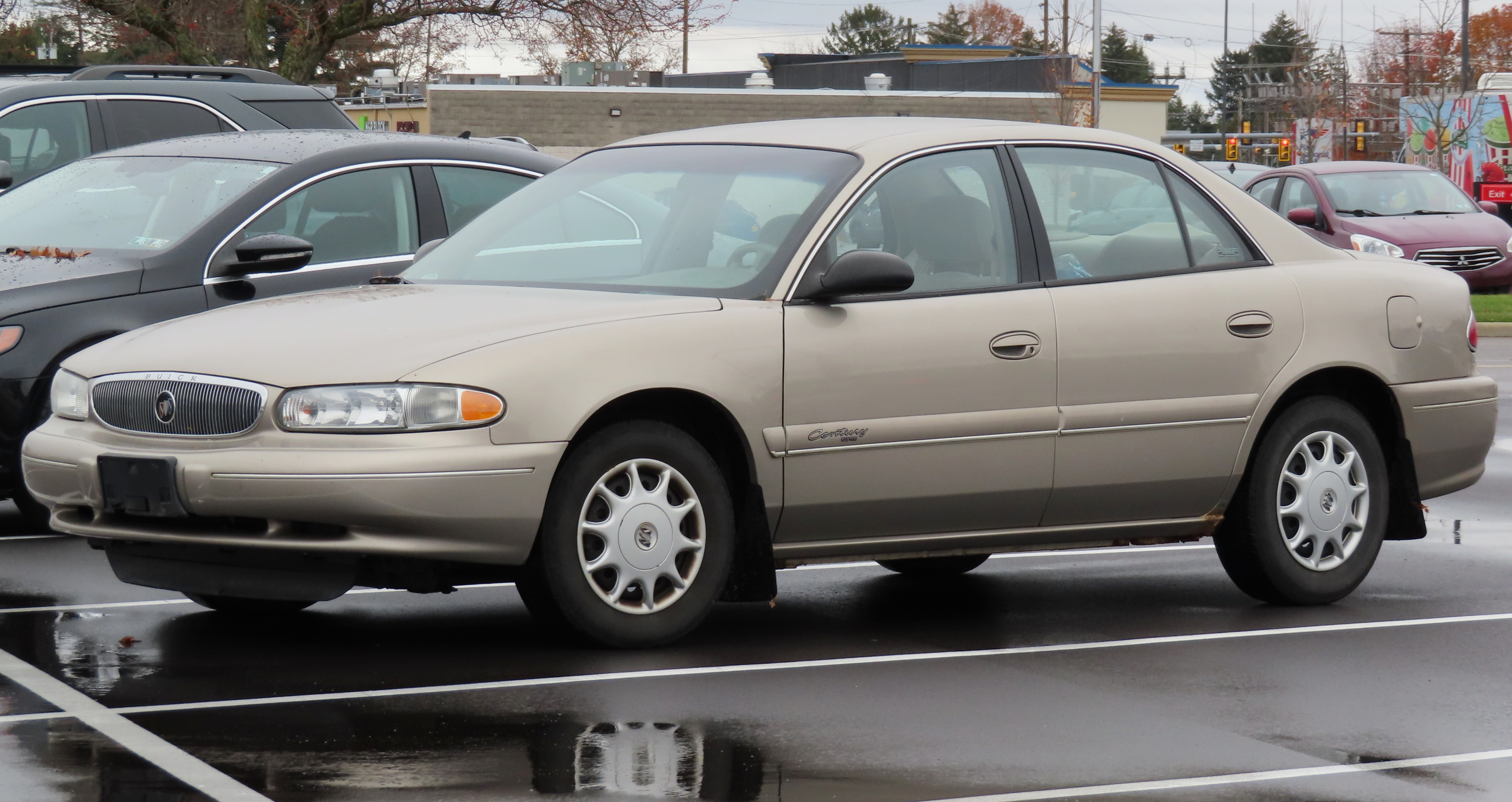
2000 Buick Century Custom

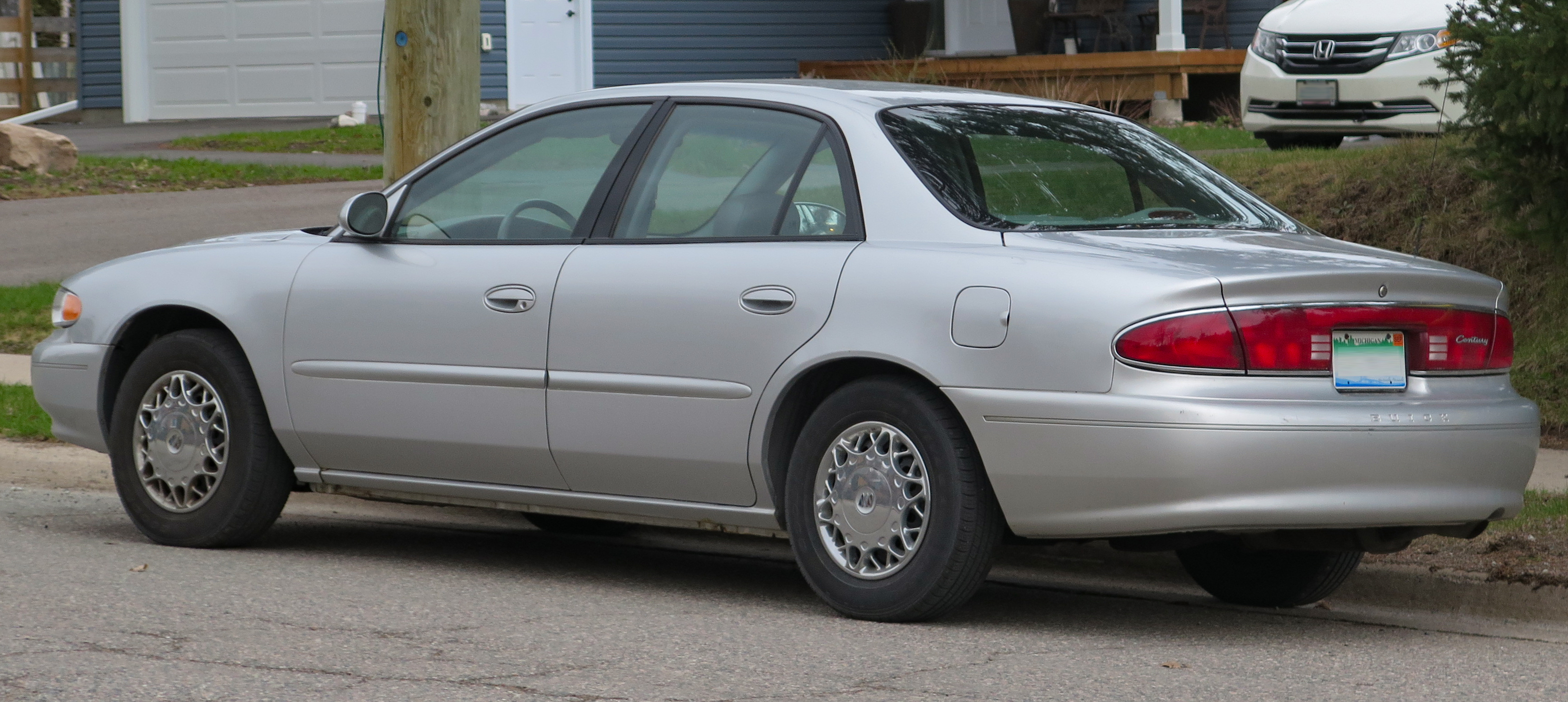
Rear View (2003 Century Limited)

For the 1997 model year, Buick released the sixth-generation Century (in December 1996, nearly 15 years after its last redesign). Joining the newly redesigned Regal on the W-body chassis, the Century continued its image of traditional entry-level luxury. While sharing a chassis and nearly identical bodywork with its counterpart (with the exception of its standard steel wheels, the Century was styled with a more upright grille than the Regal), the Century featured less powerful engines and softer suspension tuning. In further contrast to the Regal, the Century was fitted with a full-width bench seat and a column shifter (bucket seats and a console were optional); in place of full instrumentation, the dashboard lacked a tachometer.

Offered solely as a four-door sedan (the Century Estate station wagon was discontinued), the Century carried over the standard "Custom" and upgraded "Limited" trims from the previous generation. Following the retirement of the Skylark, the Century became the entry-level line for the entire Buick brand for 1999.

For 2003, the Century underwent some revision, as both trim lines were consolidated into an unnamed model. A slight de-contenting of the model line began, with many Limited-trim features (antilock brakes, OnStar, side airbags, rear window antenna, cassette player) became optional, with the "Century" nameplate on the doors deleted (remaining only on the taillamps).

For 2005, a Special Edition option package included dual-zone automatic climate control, 16-inch chrome-plated aluminum wheels, touring tires, anti-lock brakes, a chrome grille with revised tri-shield and a rear Special Edition emblem. Only four exterior colors were offered with the Special Edition option package, Sterling Silver Metallic, Cashmere Metallic, Cardinal Red Metallic and Glacier Blue Metallic.

For 2005, the Buick LaCrosse was introduced to replace both the Century and the Regal on the W-body platform. After outliving the Regal by a model year, the final Buick Century was assembled at Oshawa Car Assembly on October 25, 2004.

=== China ===
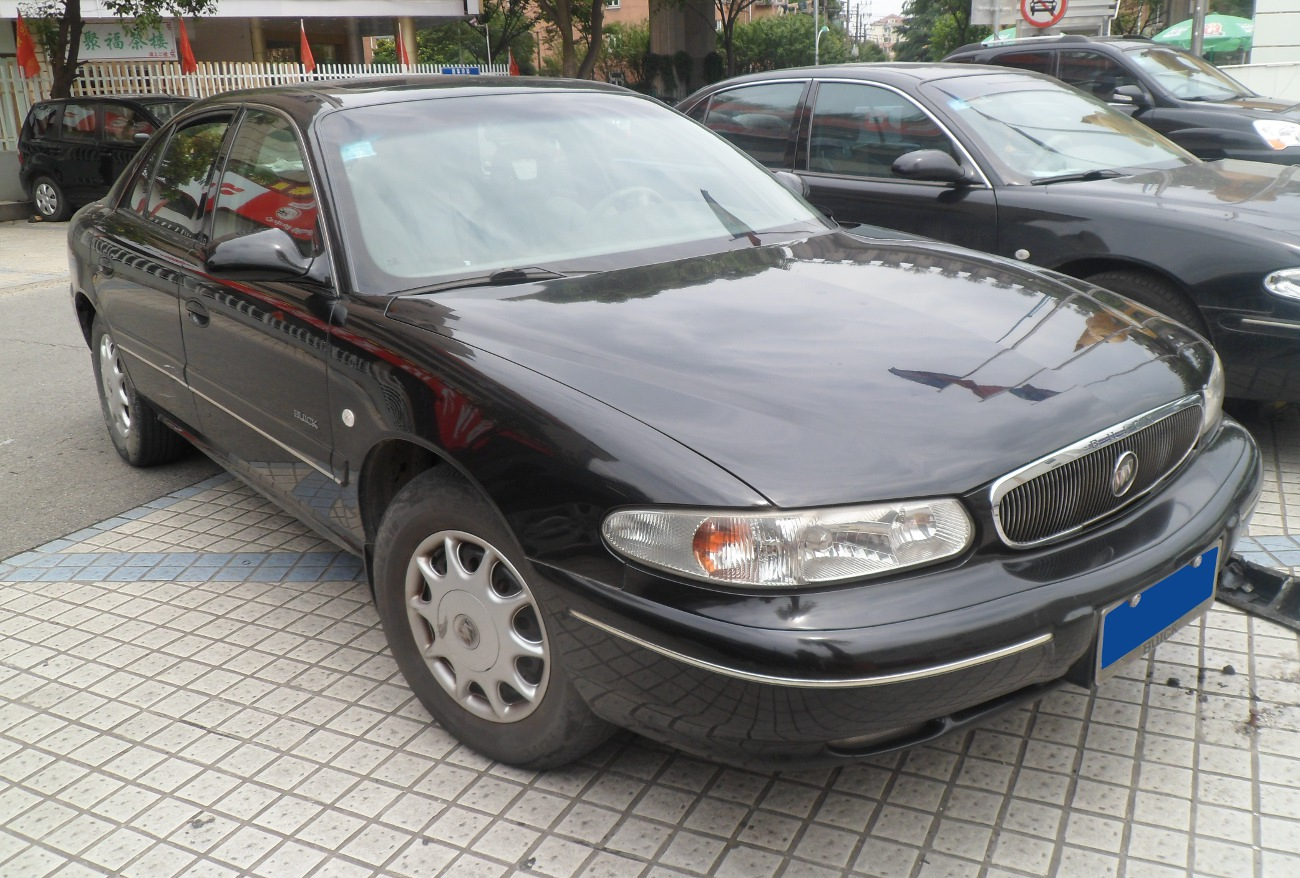
Buick "New Century" (China)

The Buick Century was produced in China as the New Century from 1998 to 2000. The engine was the 3.0 liter LW9 V6 engine which was also used in the first-generation Buick GL8. A four-cylinder model was also available paired with a 5-speed manual gearbox. The Century was replaced by the Buick Regal due to poor sales.

After the discontinuation of the model in 2000, the New Century name was used as a trim level of the Buick Regal, sold until at least 2005.

=== Engines ===
- 1997–1999 L82 3.1 L (191 cu in) "3100" V6 160 hp (119 kW), 185 lb⋅ft (251 N⋅m)
- 2000–2005 LG8 3.1 L (191 cu in) "3100" V6 175 hp (130 kW), 195 lb⋅ft (264 N⋅m)
- 1998–2000 L34 2.0 L (121 cu in) "E-TEC II" I4 120 hp (89 kW), 126 lb⋅ft (171 N⋅m) – Chinese market only
- 1998–2000 LW9 3.0 L (182 cu in) "3000" V6 170 hp (127 kW), 185 lb⋅ft (251 N⋅m) – Chinese market only

== Usage of the name in China (2023) ==
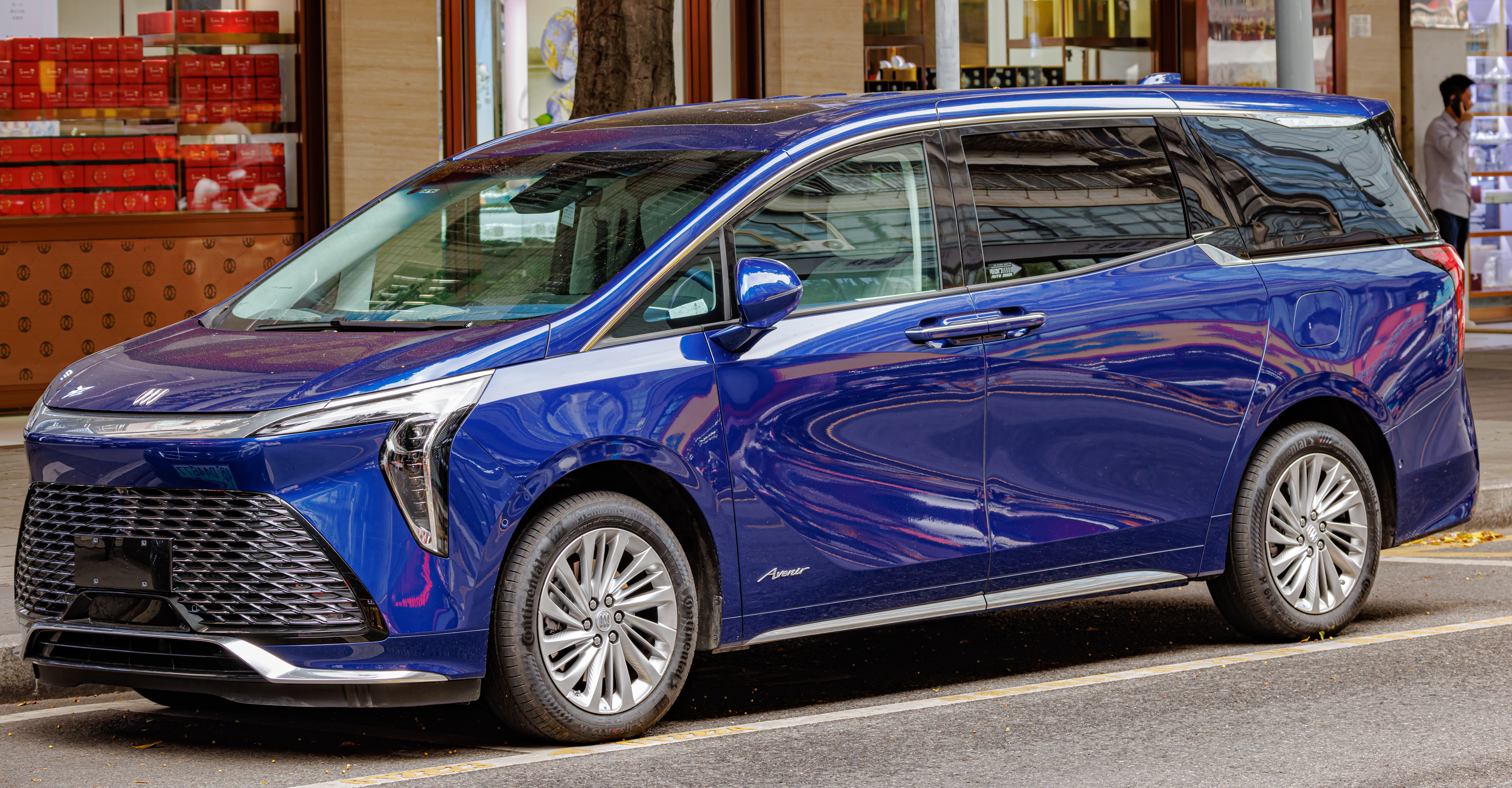
Buick GL8 Century (China)

In China, the fourth generation Buick GL8 minivan was marketed as the Buick Century.
