= Framingham Airport =

Framingham Airport may refer to:

- Framingham Airport (1923–32), Framingham, Massachusetts
- Framingham Airport (1931–45), Framingham, Massachusetts
