= Oldsmobile Cutlass Supreme =

Mid-sized car produced by Oldsmobile (1965-1997)

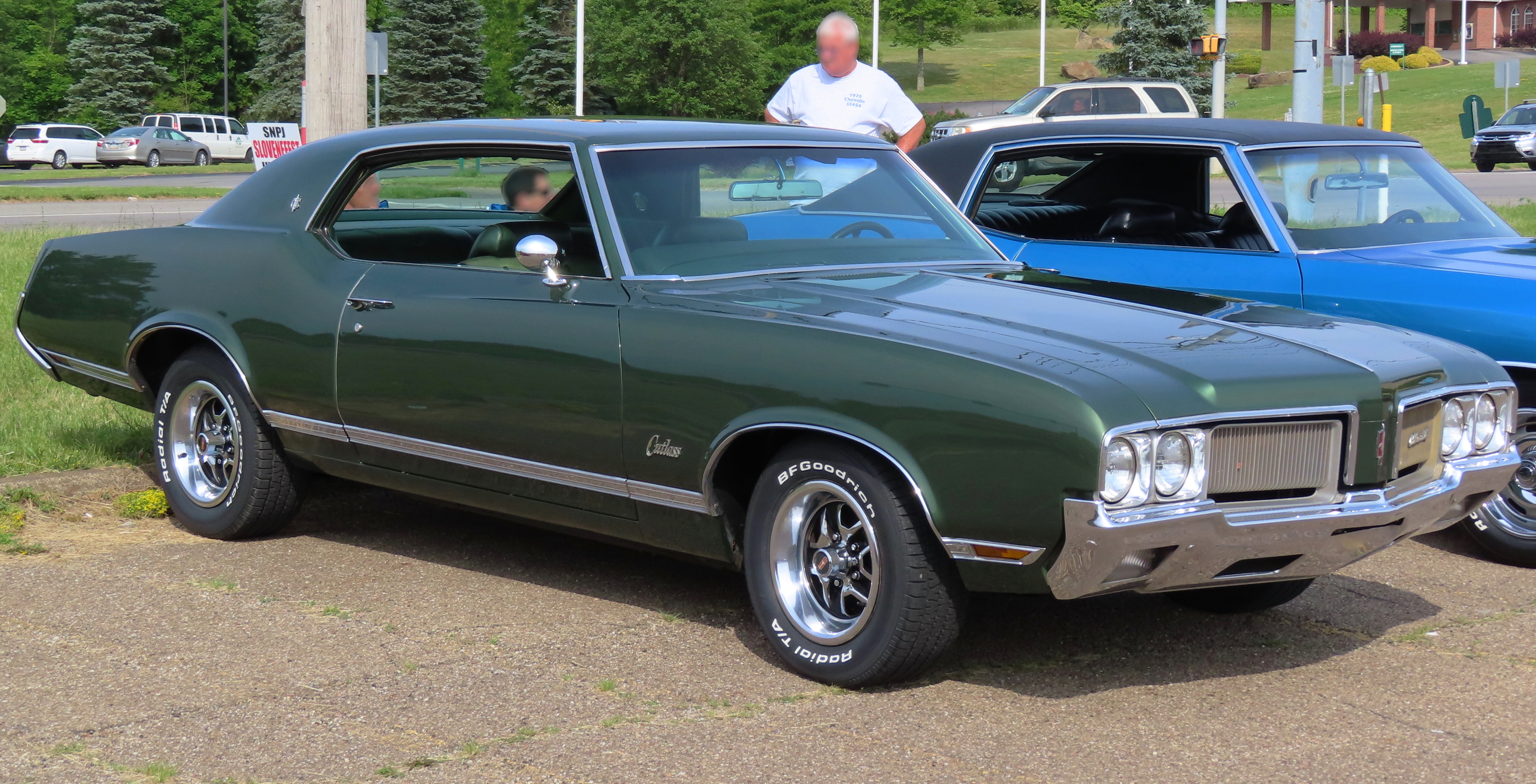
- 1970 Oldsmobile Cutlass Supreme

Overview
- Manufacturer: Oldsmobile (General Motors)
- Production: 1965–1997

Body and chassis
- Class: Personal luxury car (1966–1988); Mid-size (1988–1997)
- Layout: FR layout (1966–1988); Transverse front-engine, front-wheel drive (1988–1997)

Chronology
- Successor: Oldsmobile Intrigue

The Oldsmobile Cutlass Supreme is a mid-size car produced by Oldsmobile between 1966 and 1997. It was positioned as a premium offering at the top of the Cutlass range. It began as a trim package, developed its own roofline, and rose during the mid-1970s to become not only the most popular Oldsmobile but the highest selling model in its class.

It was produced as a rear-wheel drive two-door hardtop, sedan, and station wagon into the 1980s, and a convertible through 1972. In 1988 Oldsmobile sought to capitalize on the brand equity of the Cutlass Supreme marque by replacing it with a downsized front-wheel drive model based on the General Motors W platform.

When production ended there was no direct replacement for the Cutlass Supreme, although the Intrigue introduced for 1998 was designed in size and price to replace all the Cutlass models.

== First generation (1966–1967) ==
First generation
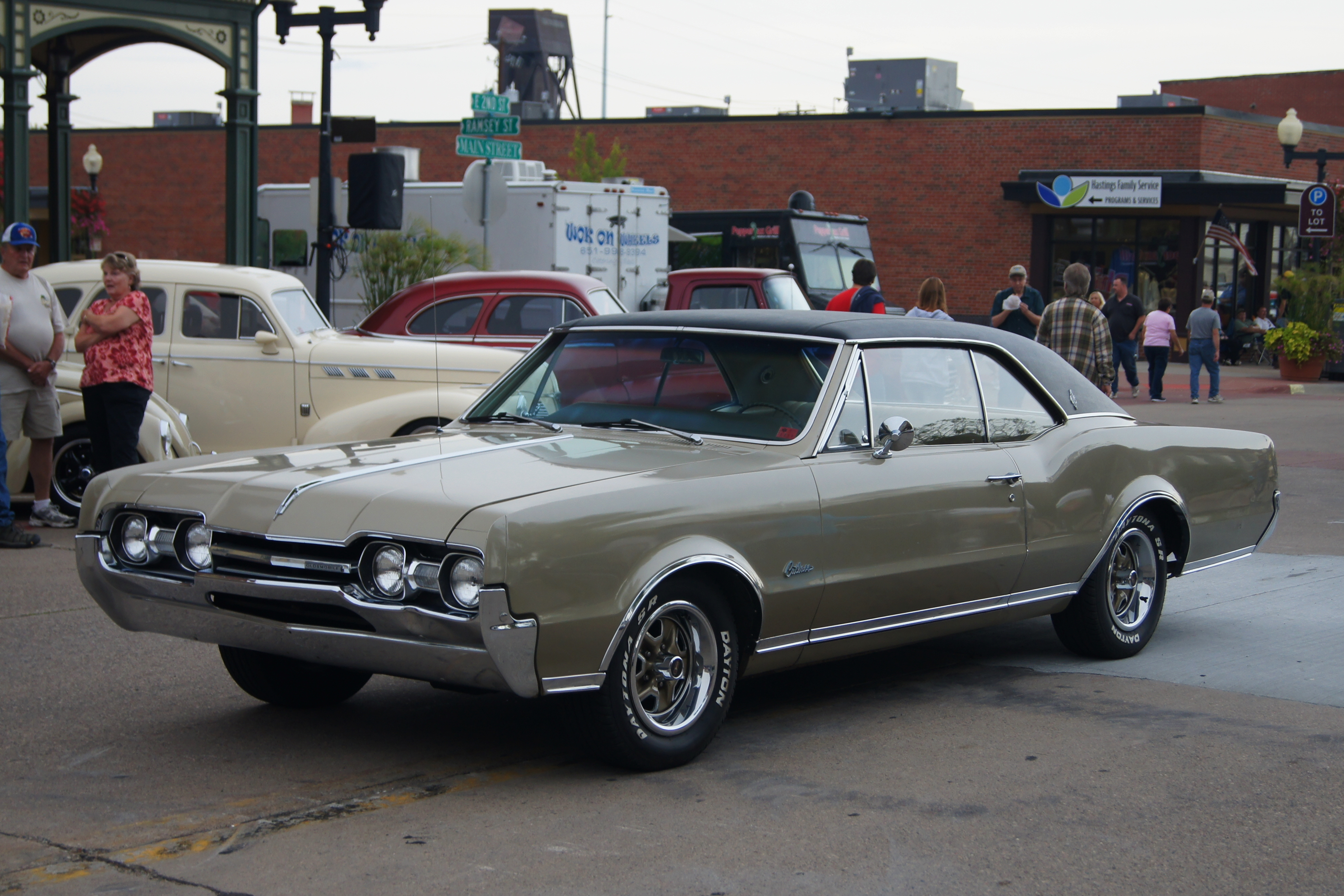
- 1967 Oldsmobile Cutlass Supreme

Overview
- Production: 1965–1967
- Model years: 1966–1967

Body and chassis
- Body style: 2-door convertible 2-door hardtop 2-door notchback sedan 4-door hardtop 4-door notchback sedan
- Layout: FR layout
- Platform: A-body
- Related: Chevrolet Malibu; Buick Skylark; Pontiac LeMans

Powertrain
- Engine: 330 cu in (5.4 L) V8
- Transmission: 4-speed manual 2-speed automatic 3-speed manual

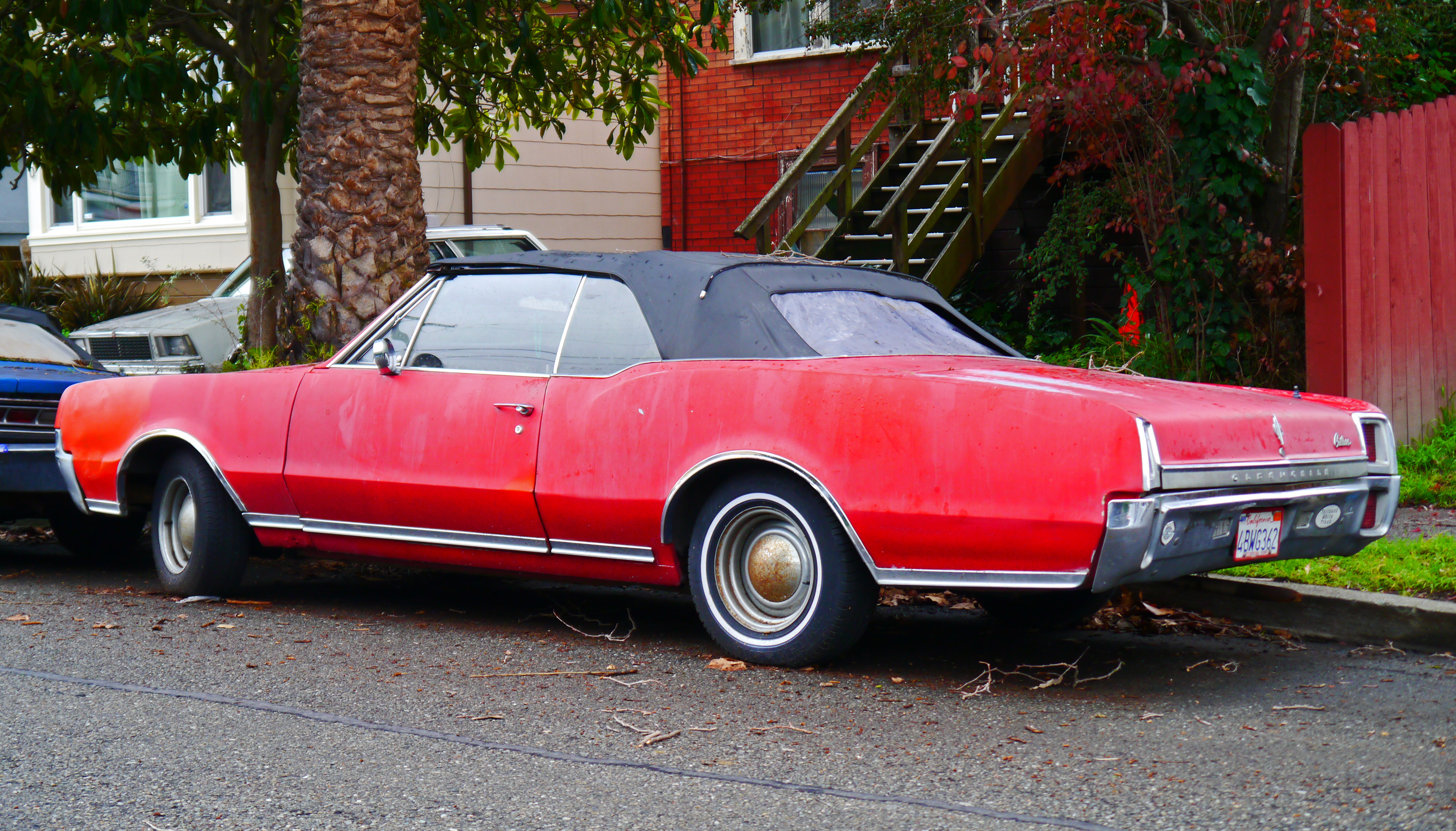
Oldsmobile Cutlass Supreme rear

The Cutlass Supreme name first appeared for the 1966 model year, the first year of GM's new intermediate four-door hardtop sedan—also known as the Holiday Sedan. In addition to the new body style (also available on the midline F-85 Deluxe series), the Supreme featured a plusher interior that included a bench seat with armrest, full wheel covers and deluxe door panels among other items including "CS" emblems on the rear C-pillars and trunk lid. Although smaller than the traditional domestic cars, "its deluxe interior makes it comparable with LTD, VIP, DPL, and Caprice."

For the 1967 model year, the Cutlass Supreme line was expanded into a full series that also included a two-door hardtop coupe (Holiday Coupe), two-door pillared coupe (Sport Coupe), four-door pillared sedan (Town Sedan) and a convertible. Generally, interior appointments in Supreme models were more luxurious than lesser F-85 and Cutlass series cars and included a cloth or "Morocceen" vinyl bench seat with armrest in sedan models and all-vinyl Strato bucket seats in coupes and convertibles.

The standard Supreme engine for both years was Oldsmobile's 330 cu in (5.4 L) "Ultra High Compression" Jetfire Rocket V8 rated at 320 hp (239 kW) with a four-barrel carburetor. Transmission offerings included a standard three-speed manual with column shift, floor-mounted four-speed manual with Hurst shifter or a two-speed Jetaway automatic.

In 1967, the high-performance 442 package with the 400 cu in (6.6 L) 350 horsepower (260 kW) V8 was available on three Cutlass Supreme models including the sport coupe, Holiday coupe and convertible. Also available on each of those three Supreme two-door models was "Turnpike Cruiser" option that included a 400 cubic-inch V8 with two-barrel carburetor and 300 hp (220 kW) rating along with a numerically lower rear axle and Turbo-Hydramatic transmission.

== Second generation (1968–1972) ==
Second generation
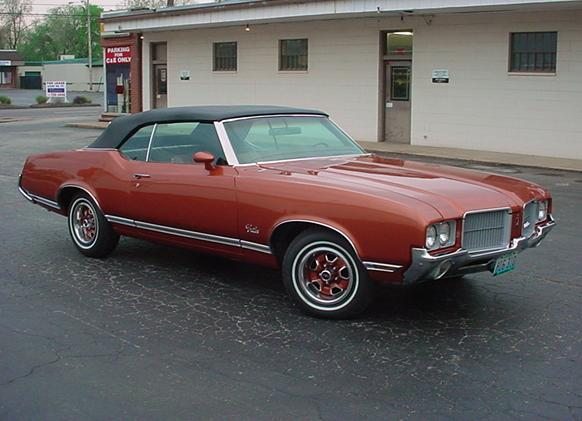
- 1971 Oldsmobile Cutlass Supreme

Overview
- Production: 1968–1972

Body and chassis
- Body style: 2-door convertible 2-door hardtop coupe 4-door notchback sedan 4-door station wagon
- Layout: FR layout
- Platform: A-body
- Related: Acadian Beaumont; Chevrolet Malibu; Pontiac LeMans; Buick Skylark (coupe utility); Chevrolet El Camino; GMC Sprint

Powertrain
- Engine: 330 cu in (5.4 L) V8; 350 cu in (5.7 L) V8
- Transmission: 2-speed automatic 3-speed automatic 4-speed manual

Dimensions
- Wheelbase: Coupe: 112.0 in (2,845 mm); Sedan/Wagon: 116.0 in (2,946 mm); Vista Cruiser: 121.0 in (3,073 mm)

The Cutlass and other GM intermediates were completely restyled for 1968 with wheelbases shortened to 112 inches (2,845 mm) for 2-door coupe models and lengthened one inch to 116 in (2,946 mm) for four-door sedans and station wagons (with the exception of the glass-roof Vista Cruiser station wagon, which rode on an even longer 121-inch (3,100 mm) wheelbase). The Cutlass Supreme, now the top-line Olds intermediate series, was pared down to two- and four-door hardtop models with the pillared sedans and coupes dropped and the convertible moved to the lower-priced Cutlass "S" line, upon which the 4-4-2 muscle car was now based. Also the standard Rocket V8 was enlarged from 330 to 350 cubic inches with 310 hp (231 kW).

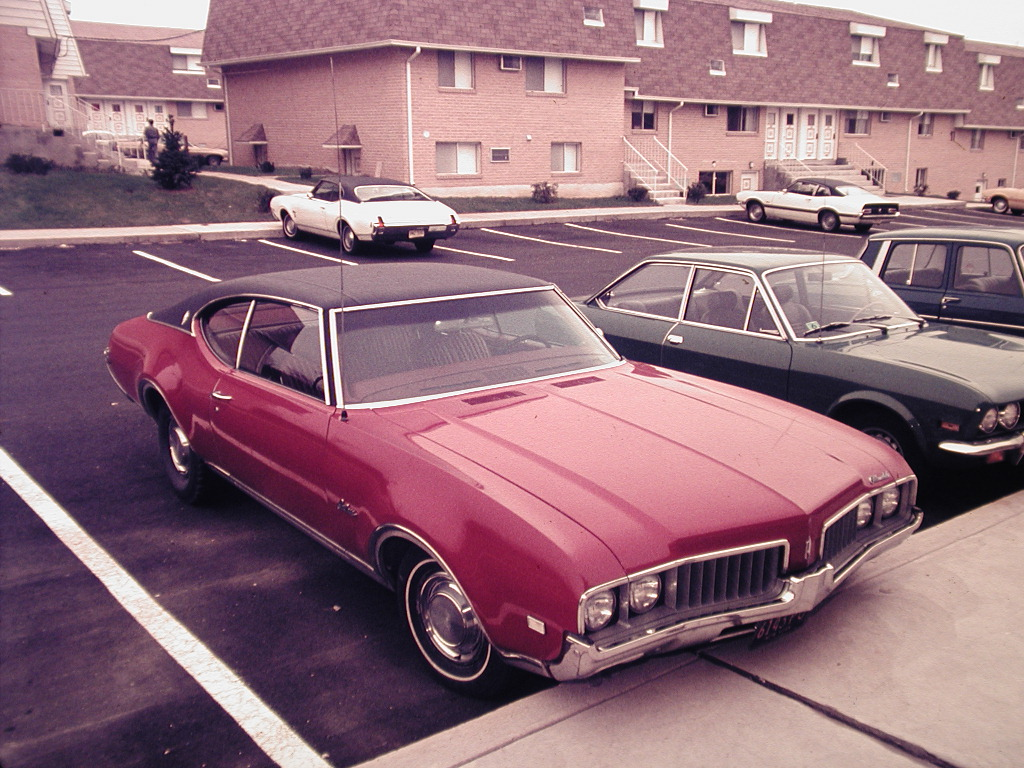
1969 Oldsmobile Cutlass Supreme, two-door hardtop coupe, front view

The 1969 models received only a minor facelift such as a new split grille and vertical taillights with the same model and engine offerings. A new three-speed Turbo-Hydramatic 350 was added to the option list to replace the two-speed Jetaway automatic. Headrests were made standard equipment due to federal safety mandate and the ignition switch moved from the instrument panel to the steering column, which also was designed to lock the steering wheel. This ignition/steering wheel interlock, found on all 1969-model General Motors passenger cars, except for the Corvair, debuted one year before the federal government mandated it on all 1970 models.

For 1970, the Cutlass Supreme nameplate was switched to Oldsmobile's equivalent of the downsized Pontiac Grand Prix on the A-body, to give the division an entry in the burgeoning market for smaller personal luxury cars. As such, the two-door hardtop had a new notchback roofline, while lower trim-line Cutlass coupes had a fastback style roof. The model remained in this role for virtually all of its production life. Unlike the Grand Prix and the also-related Chevrolet Monte Carlo, which had wholly separate bodies, longer wheelbases and different names from their less expensive siblings, the Supreme shared front and rear body parts and its 112-inch wheelbase with the standard 2-door Cutlass line and was always marketed as part of it. In addition to the two-door hardtop (Holiday Coupe), the Cutlass Supreme series for 1970 also included a four-door hardtop (Holiday Sedan) and regained the convertible bodystyle.

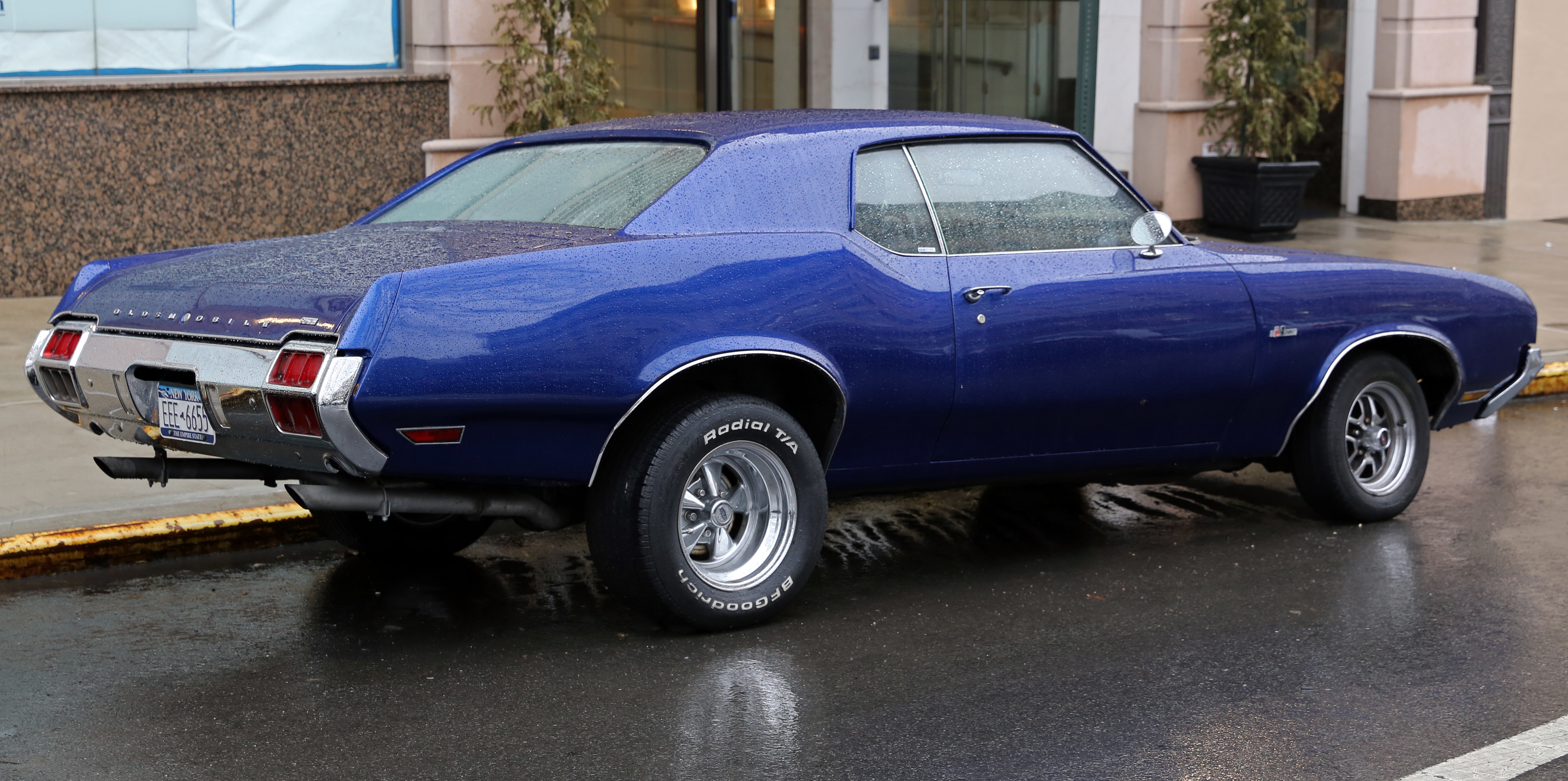
1971 Oldsmobile Cutlass Supreme Holiday Coupe, rear view

Supreme interiors were more luxurious that those of other Cutlass models, with a choice of a Custom Sport notchback bench seat with armrest in Osborne cloth or Morocceen vinyl or, at no extra cost (on coupes and convertibles only), Strato bucket seats in Morocceen vinyl. Available at extra cost with the bucket seats was a center console with floor-mounted shifter for which the Turbo-Hydramatic transmission could also be had with the Hurst Dual-Gate shifter commonly found in the division's musclecar, the Oldsmobile 442.

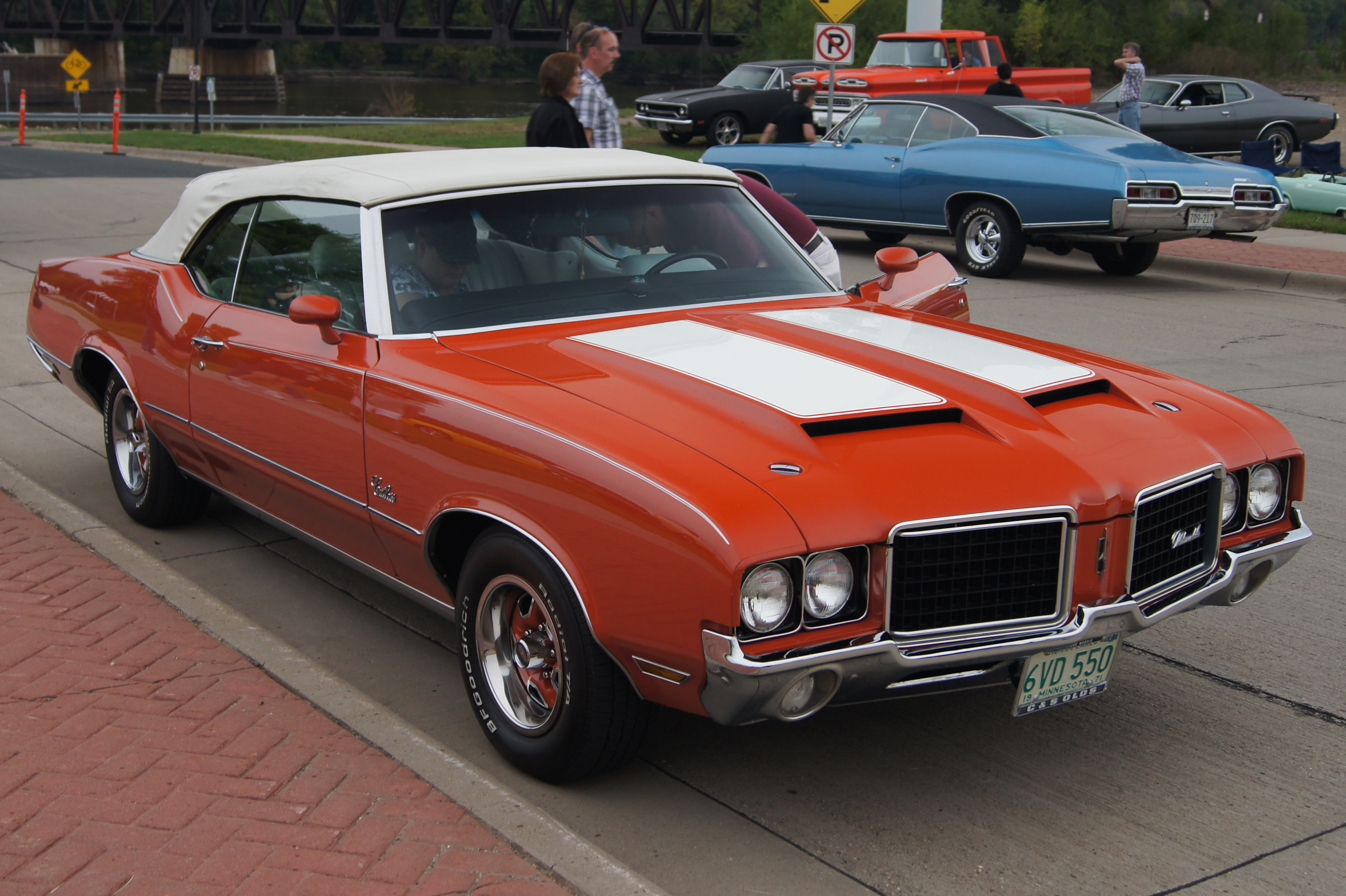
1972 Oldsmobile Cutlass Supreme convertible

For 1970 and 1971, both the Cutlass Supreme coupe and convertible were available with the Code Y-79 high performance "SX" option package. The SX option included several versions of the larger 455 cubic-inch Rocket V8 borrowed from the Olds 442 along with the cutout rear bumper and exhaust trumpets, 442's rallye suspension (optional), distinctive SX badges and other features.

A W31 option added distinctive stripes and badging, and a camshaft with increased lift and duration for the 350 engine. The W31 option was offered on Supreme coupes only in 1968, but continued on lower-line F-85 and Cutlass S coupes through 1970.

1972 was the only year in which the Cutlass Supreme notchback hardtop could be equipped with the L75 455 and M20 four speed transmission, and only 77 of these cars were produced. All 1972 L75 455/M20 cars used the larger 2.07 valves and the W30 automatic camshaft. This gave the L75 455/M20 cars 270 net horsepower, as opposed to the TH400 automatic-equipped L75 cars, which produced 250 net horsepower.

The 1972 Hurst/Olds was based on the Supreme two-door hardtop and convertible, powered by both versions of the 455 Rocket offered on the 4-4-2, along with a Turbo 400 transmission with Hurst Dual/Gate shifter. The H/O convertible also served as the Indianapolis 500 Pace Car in 1972.

1972 was also the final year for Olds to offer the Cutlass Supreme convertible, until 1990. In its final year, it was the best-selling convertible in the U.S., with 11,571 sold, or 16% of the market, beating the Eldorado and Corvette. From 1973 to 1975, the only Oldsmobile convertible offered was the full-sized Delta 88 Royale.

== Third generation (1973–1977) ==
Third generation
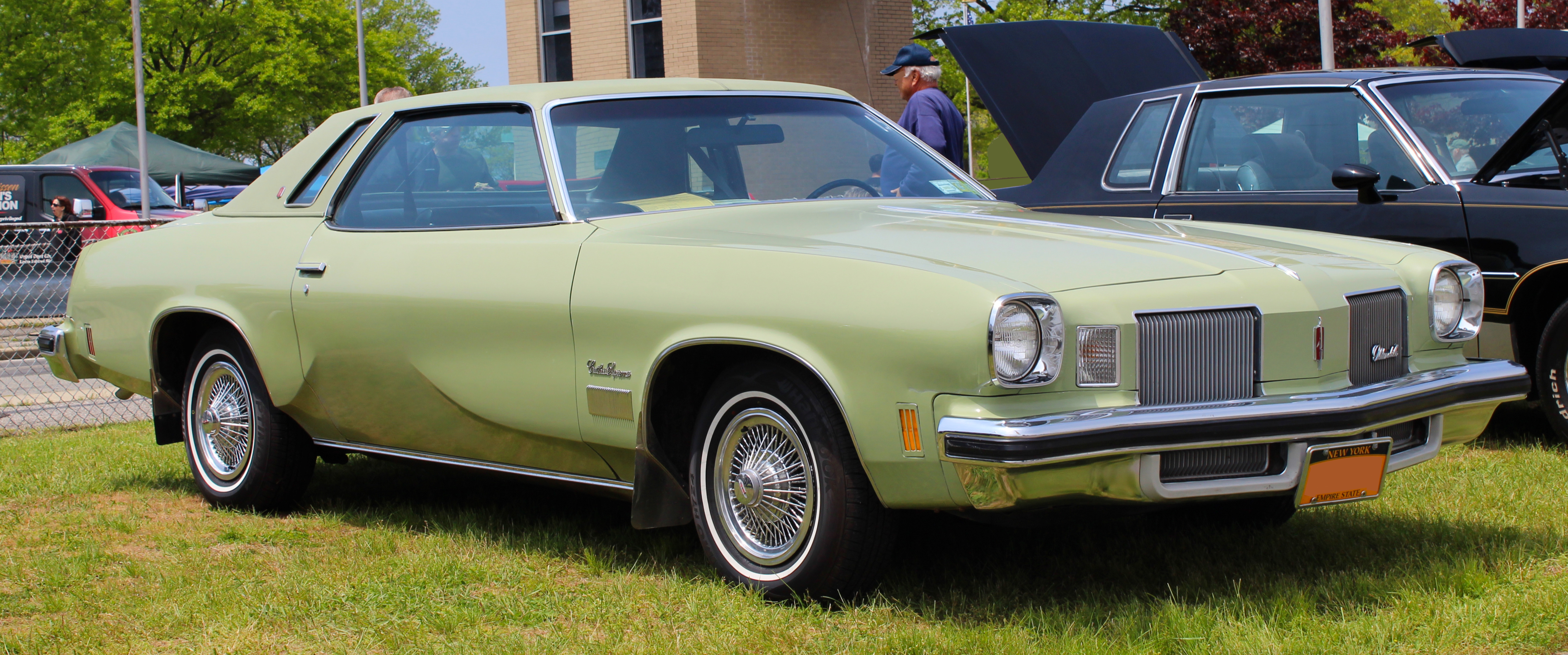
- 1974 Cutlass Supreme coupe

Overview
- Also called: Oldsmobile Cutlass Salon
- Production: 1972–1977
- Model years: 1973–1977
- Assembly: Lansing Car Assembly, Lansing, Michigan, Arlington Assembly, Arlington, Texas, Doraville Assembly, Doraville, Georgia; Framingham Assembly, Framingham, Massachusetts

Body and chassis
- Body style: 2-door coupe 4-door sedan
- Layout: FR layout
- Platform: A-body
- Related: Chevrolet Chevelle Laguna; Pontiac Grand Am; Buick Century Gran Sport

Powertrain
- Engine: 231 cu in (3.8 L) Buick V6; 250 cu in (4.1 L) Chevrolet I6; 260 cu in (4.3 L) Oldsmobile V8; 350 cu in (5.7 L) Oldsmobile V8; 403 cu in (6.6 L) Oldsmobile V8; 455 cu in (7.5 L) Oldsmobile V8
- Transmission: 3-speed manual 4-speed manual 5-speed manual 3-speed automatic

Dimensions
- Wheelbase: 112 in (2,845 mm)
- Length: 207.0 in (5,258 mm)
- Width: 77.7 in (1,974 mm)
- Height: 54.9 in (1,394 mm)

In 1973, the Cutlass Supreme, like other GM mid-size cars, was redesigned. Hardtop models were replaced by new "Colonnade" styling with fixed center pillars. Concerns over proposed rollover standards caused many automakers to phase out their pillarless hardtops and convertibles throughout the 1970s, and the Cutlass was no exception. Despite some initial controversy over the disappearance of hardtop models, the new 1973 GM mid-sized line proved highly successful. Cutlass Supreme coupes had a unique roofline with vertical opera windows not shared with other Cutlass coupes, as well as unique front end styling.

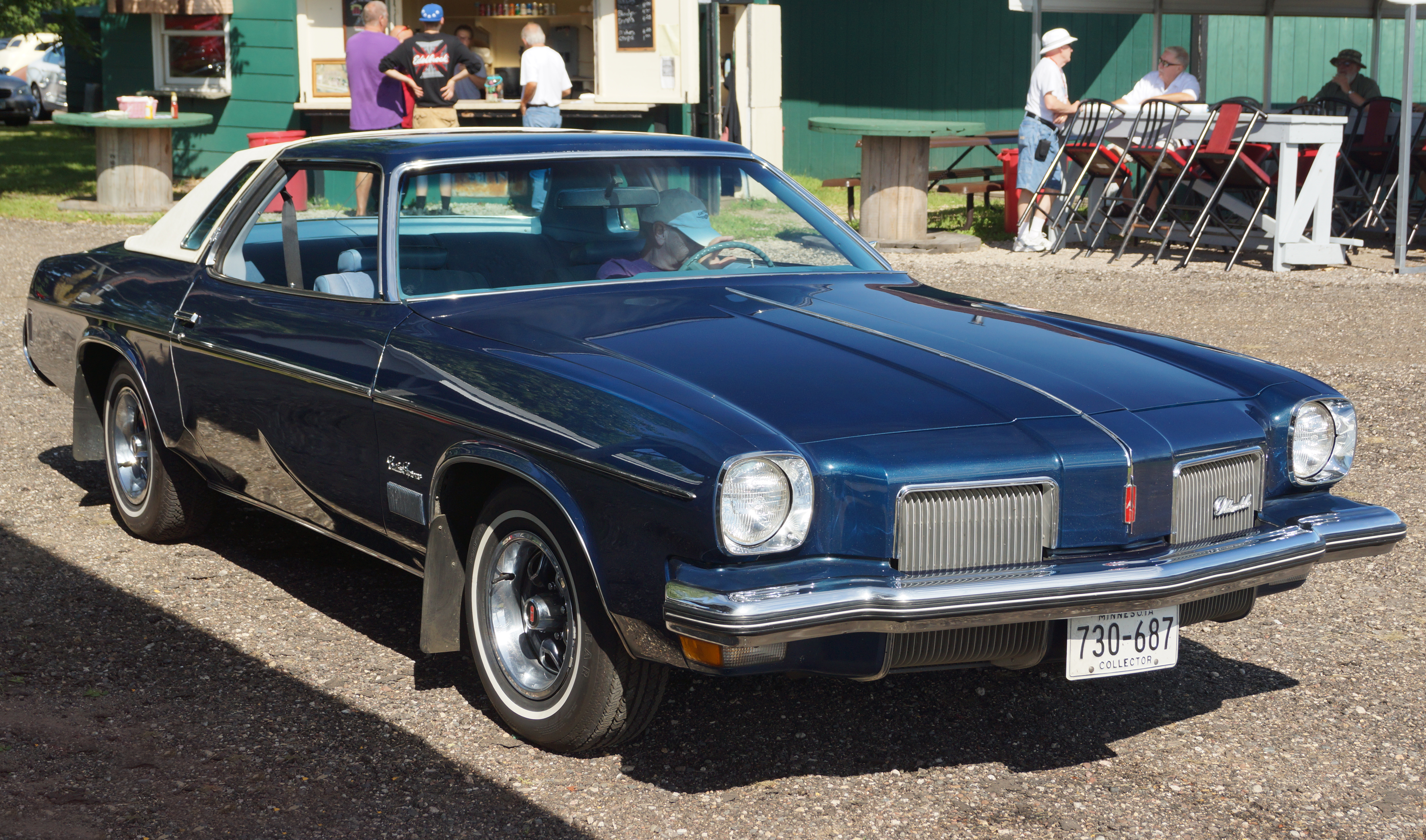
1973 Oldsmobile Cutlass Supreme coupe

The Cutlass line soon became Oldsmobile's biggest seller, accounting for 43% of the division's total volume in 1974, with the Cutlass Supreme coupe being the single most popular model. With rectangular headlights newly legalized in 1975, the Cutlass received a facelift for the 1976 model year featuring quad headlights flanking a waterfall grille, and on coupes, the removal of the lower body "skeg lines". This attractive redesign boosted sales even further. The Cutlass line as a whole was America's best-selling car in 1976, helping Oldsmobile to become the only marque outside of Ford and Chevrolet to break one-million units sold. By 1977, however, GM had downsized its full-size models, and the Cutlass Supreme was now nearly identical in size to the redesigned Delta 88. That situation would last only that one year, as GM planned to downsize the Olds Cutlass and other intermediates for 1978.

In addition to the Colonnade hardtop coupe, the Cutlass Supreme was also offered in a four-door Colonnade sedan (with six-window styling and frameless door windows) as well as six-and-nine passenger station wagons - the wagons with the woodgrain exterior trim were marketed under the Vista Cruiser nameplate previously used on Oldsmobile's stretched-wheelbase station wagons with raised roof and skylights from 1964 to 1972 while the Cutlass Supreme Cruiser was offered with the same equipment and dimensions without the woodgrained appearance.

The Supreme Colonnade sedan was available in 1973 as the Cutlass Salon, which was an option package that included radial tires, upgraded suspension and reclining bucket seats upholstered in corduroy or vinyl trim along with color-keyed wheelcovers - designed as sort of a European-style luxury/touring sedan similar to the Pontiac Grand Am of the same period. For 1974, the Salon package was also made available on the Supreme Colonnade coupe and in 1975, the Salon was upgraded to a separate series available in both sedan and coupe. The 1975s received a new, more squared off grille, slightly larger and incorporating parking lights. The bumpers also continued to grow ever larger.

For 1973–74, the 350 Rocket V8 with four-barrel carburetor and 180 horsepower (130 kW) was the standard Cutlass Supreme engine with a 250-horsepower 455 Rocket offered as an option. Both three- and four-speed manual transmissions were offered in 1973, but the greatest majority of Cutlasses (including Supremes) were built with the three-speed Turbo-Hydramatic automatic transmission which became standard equipment in 1974, along with variable-ratio power steering.

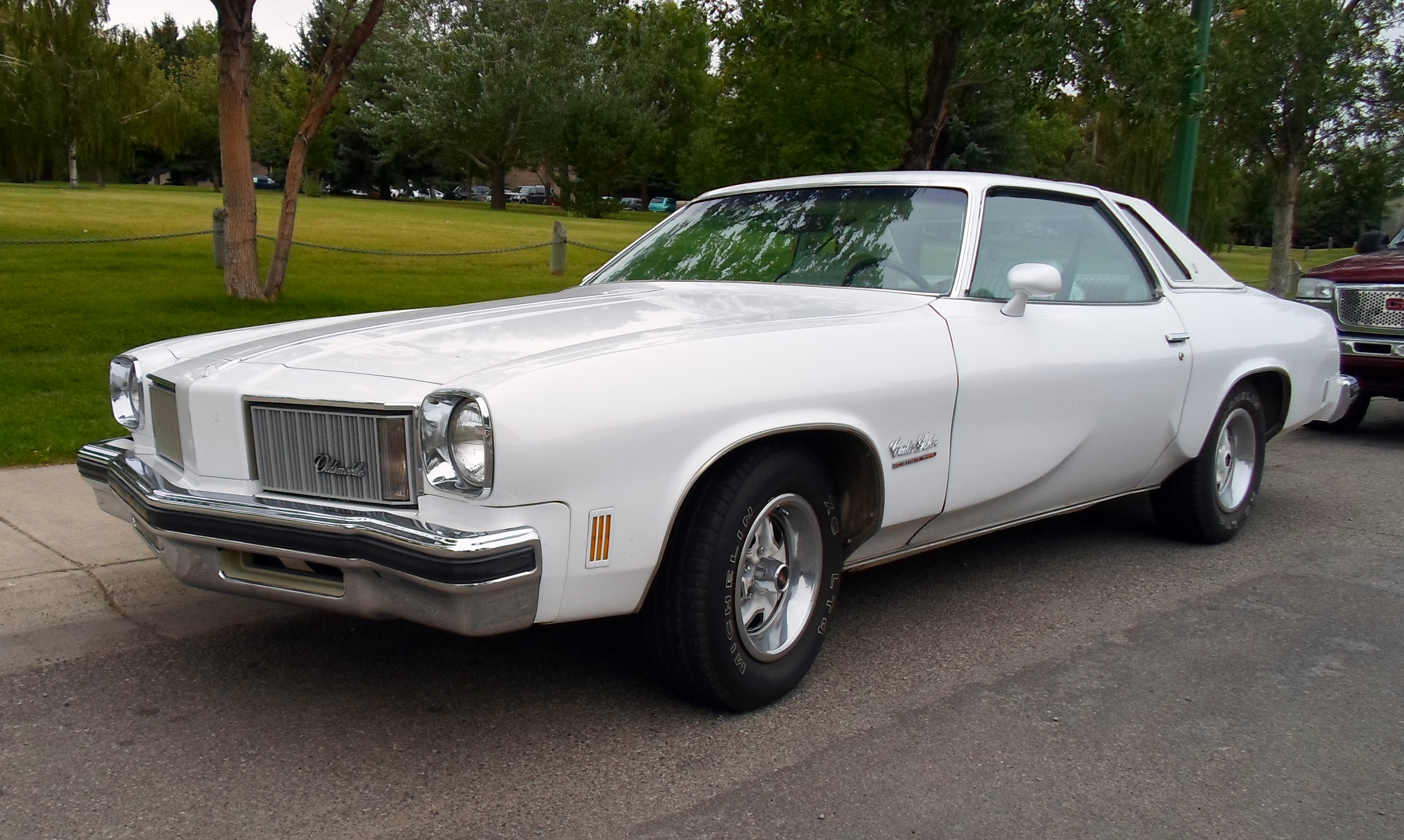
1975 Oldsmobile Cutlass Salon

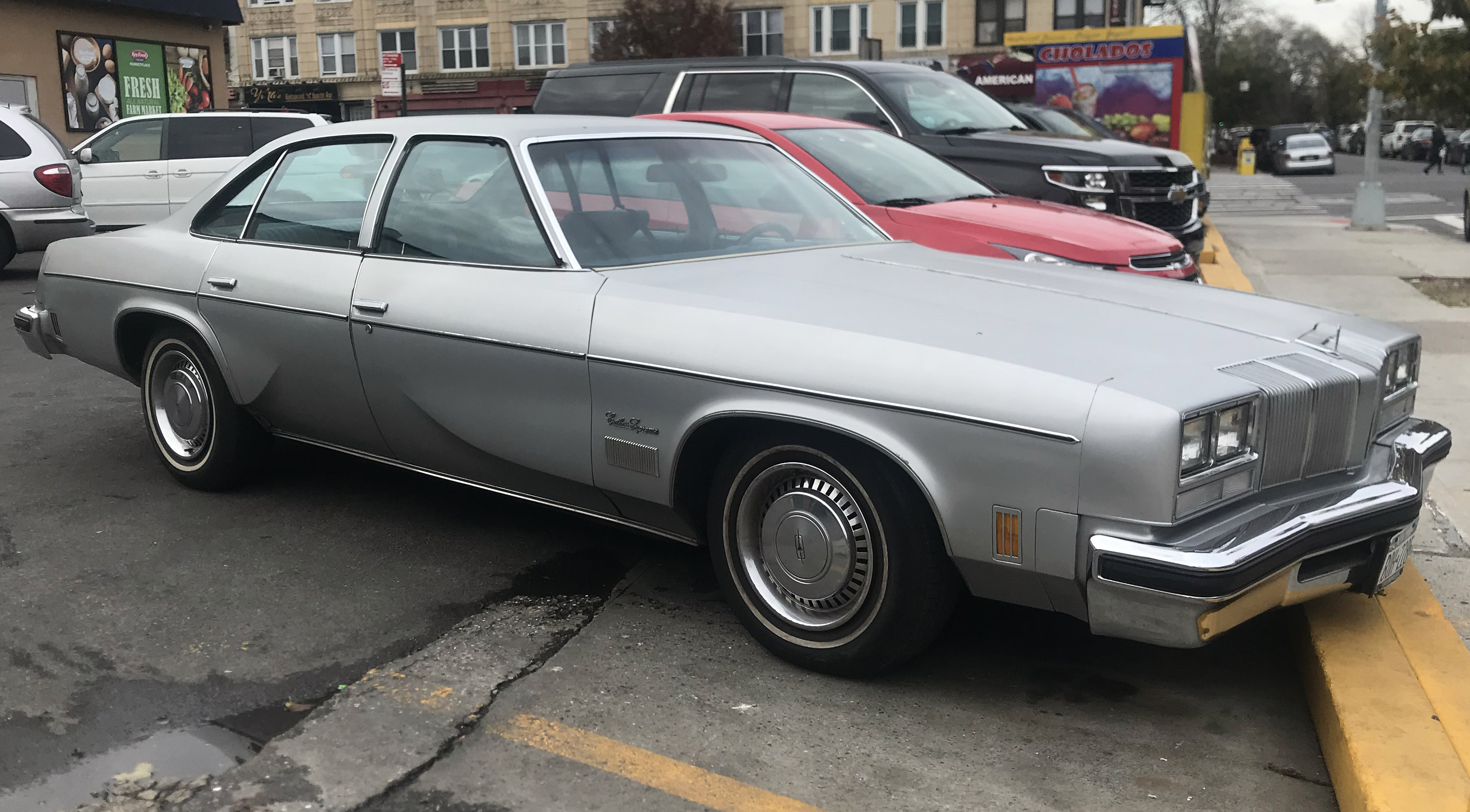
1976 Oldsmobile Cutlass Supreme four-door sedan

The 1973-74 energy crisis resulting from the Arab Oil Embargo led Oldsmobile to introduce two new smaller engines to the Cutlass line in 1975. The Chevrolet built 250 cubic-inch inline six and three-speed manual transmission were reinstated as standard equipment on the Supreme coupe and sedan with a new Olds-built 260 cubic-inch Rocket V8 (standard on Cutlass Salon and optional on all other Cutlasses except wagons) offered as an option. However, the majority of Cutlass Supremes in 1975, 1976, and 1977 were sold with the now-optional 350 Rocket V8 and Turbo-Hydramatic automatic (still standard on wagons). The 455 Rocket V8 was optional through 1976, and replaced by a smaller 403 Rocket V8 in 1977, the same year in which a Buick-built 231 cubic-inch V6 replaced the Chevy inline six as base power in most Cutlass models.

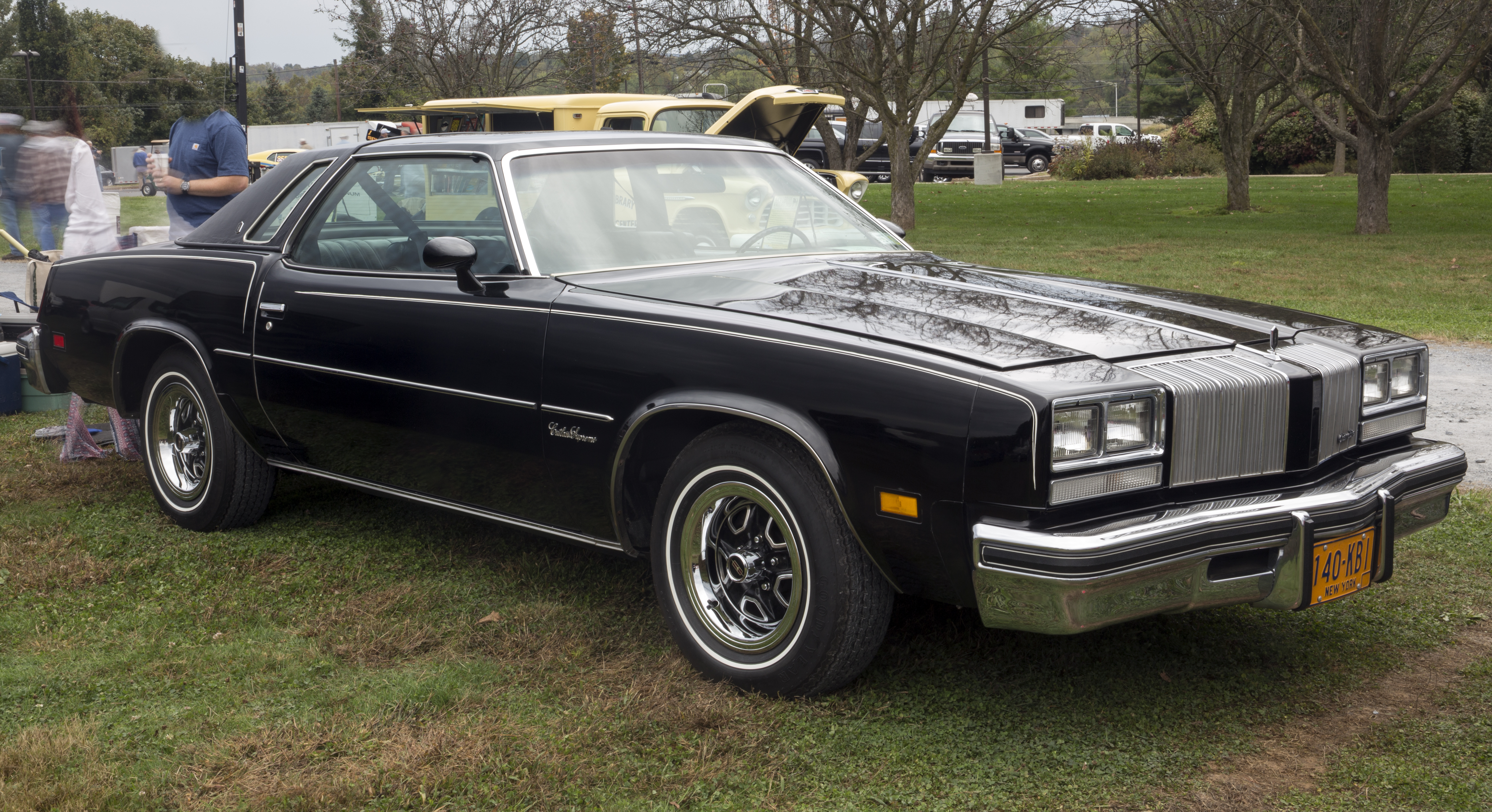
1977 Oldsmobile Cutlass Supreme coupe

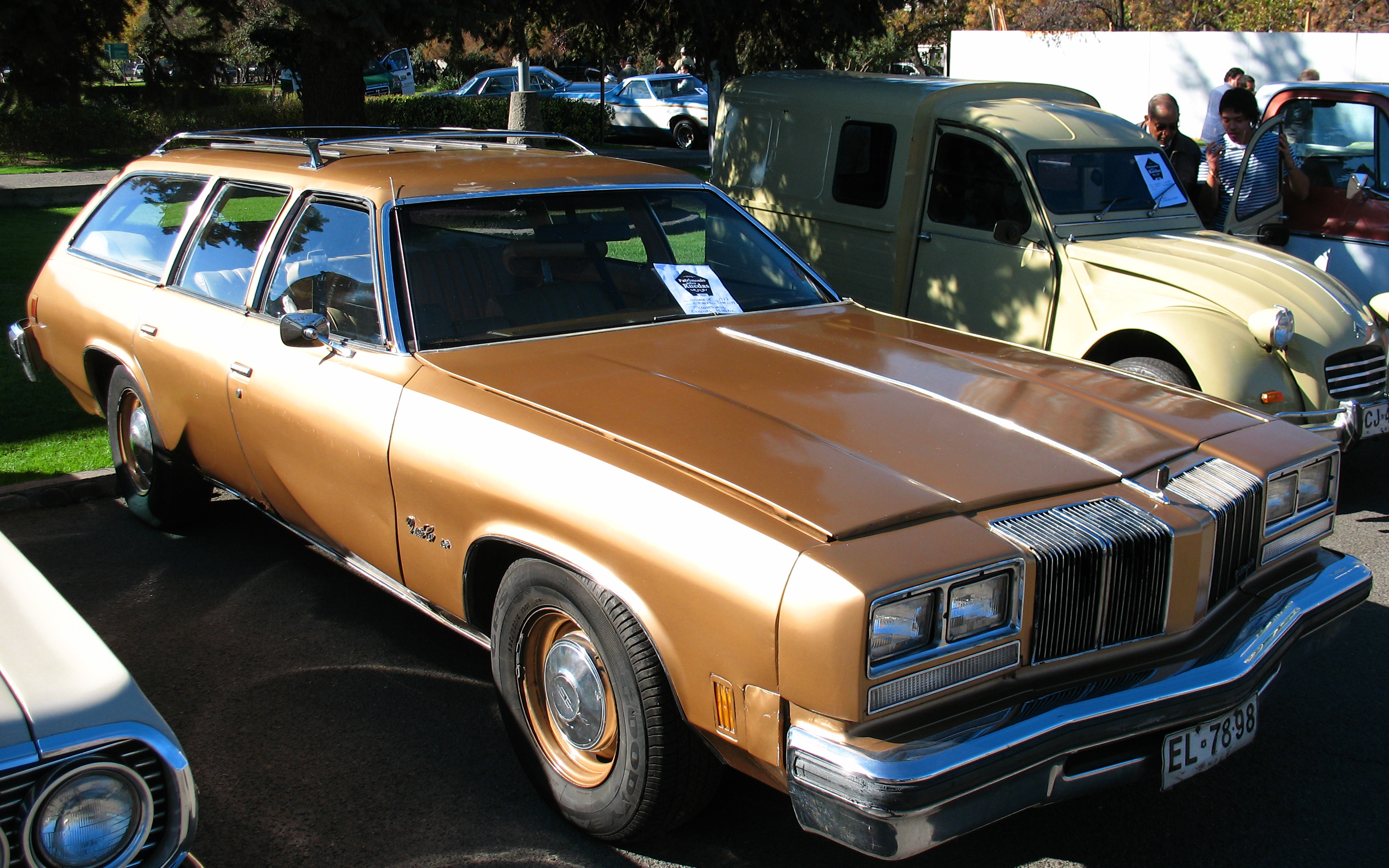
1977 Oldsmobile Cutlass Supreme Vista Cruiser

For 1976, the Cutlass Supreme Brougham coupe was added to the line, featuring a more luxurious interior trim than the regular Supreme model with pillowed crushed velour upholstery and 60/40 bench seats similar to the larger Ninety-Eight Regency. It also received quad square headlights. For 1977, the Brougham was also available as a four-door Colonnade sedan. The grille was also changed, with each half divided into five rather than two segments of bars divided by chrome strips.

A five-speed manual transmission was available as an option with the 260 V8 in all models except Supreme Brougham and station wagons for 1976–77.

== Fourth generation (1978–1988) ==
Fourth generation
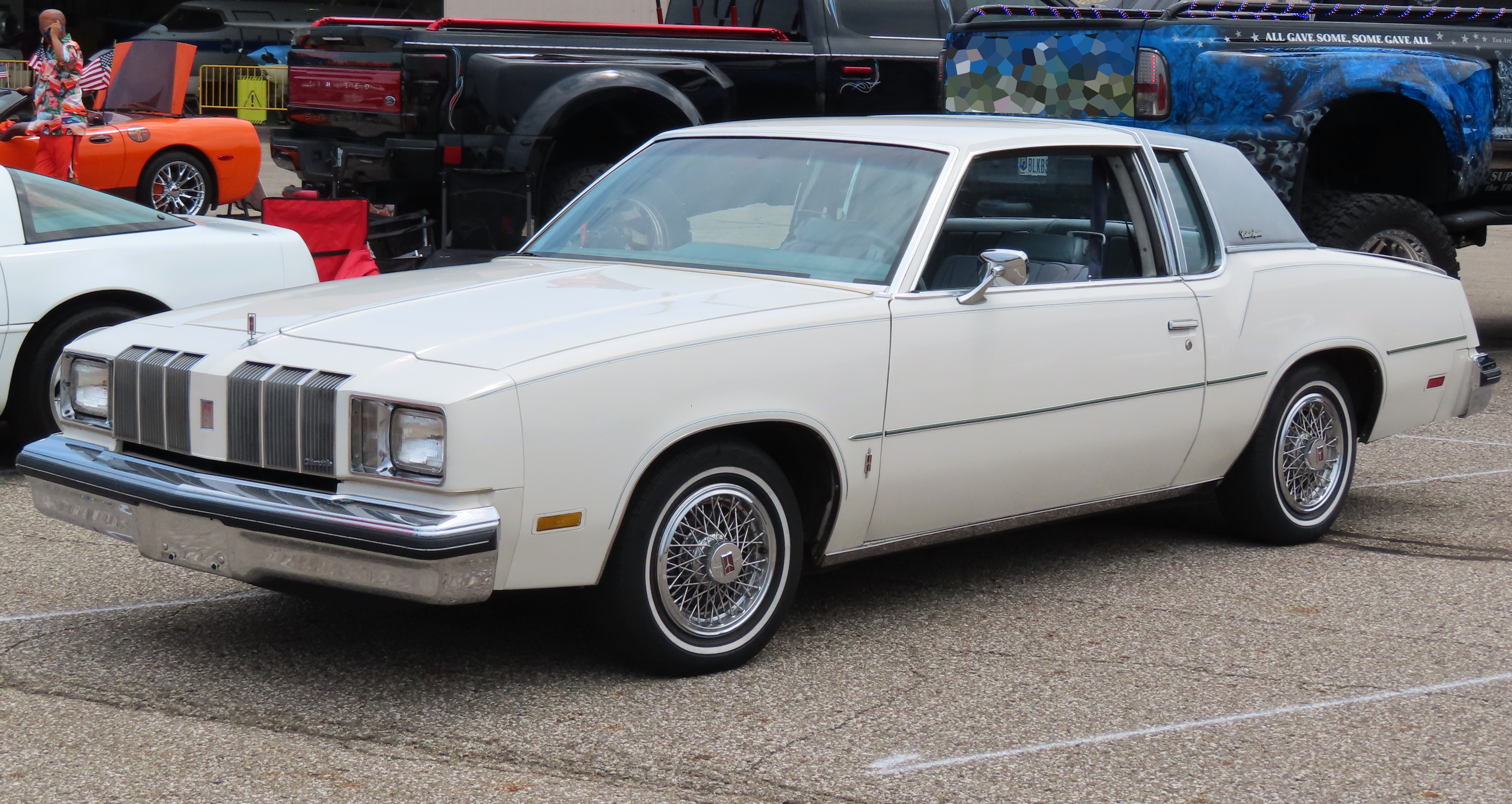
- 1978 Oldsmobile Cutlass Supreme

Overview
- Also called: Oldsmobile Cutlass Calais (1978–1984); Oldsmobile Cutlass Salon (1985–1987); Oldsmobile Cutlass Supreme Classic (1988 only); Oldsmobile Cutlass Cruiser (1982–1983)
- Production: 1977–1988
- Model years: 1978–1988
- Assembly: Arlington, Texas (Arlington Assembly; 1978–1987); Doraville, Georgia (Doraville Assembly; 1978–1984); Flint, Michigan (Buick City; 1985 only); Framingham, Massachusetts (Framingham Assembly; 1978–1981); Lansing, Michigan (Lansing Car Assembly; 1978–1984); Pontiac, Michigan (Pontiac Assembly; 1985–1988); Sainte-Thérèse, Quebec, Canada (Sainte-Thérèse Assembly; 1978–1987)

Body and chassis
- Body style: 2-door notchback coupe 4-door notchback sedan 4-door station wagon
- Layout: FR layout
- Platform: A-body (1978–1981); G-body (1982–1988)
- Related: Chevrolet Malibu; Chevrolet Monte Carlo; Chevrolet El Camino; Pontiac Grand Prix; Pontiac Grand Am; Pontiac LeMans; Pontiac Bonneville; Oldsmobile Cutlass; Buick Century; Buick Regal

Powertrain
- Engine: 231 cu in (3.8 L) Buick V6; 260 cu in (4.3 L) Oldsmobile V8; 267 cu in (4.4 L) Chevrolet V8; 305 cu in (5.0 L) Chevrolet V8; 307 cu in (5.0 L) Oldsmobile V8; 350 cu in (5.7 L) Oldsmobile V8; 260 cu in (4.3 L) Oldsmobile diesel V8; 350 cu in (5.7 L) Oldsmobile diesel V8
- Transmission: 3-speed automatic 4-speed automatic 5-speed manual (diesel)

Dimensions
- Wheelbase: 108.0 in (2,743 mm)
- Length: 200.0 in (5,080 mm)
- Width: 71.6 in (1,819 mm)
- Height: 54.9 in (1,394 mm)

For 1978, GM downsized its midsize A-body lines, including the entire Oldsmobile Cutlass line. While not as dramatic as the downsizing of the 88/98 sedans, the Cutlass Supreme shed 9.5 inches of length, four inches of wheelbase, and over 500 pounds of curb weight (dependent on powertrain); though nearly 5 inches narrower, the interior volume actually increased over its predecessor. In another change, the A-body coupes of each division were each styled with their own window line design.

Styled again as a notchback coupe with opera windows in its formal roofline, the Cutlass Supreme was joined by an upscale Brougham trim. The Cutlass Calais (replacing the previous Salon) was introduced as a touring-oriented flagship; distinguished by its color-keyed wheelcovers, the Calais offerered upgraded suspension and steering, along with front bucket seats and full instrumentation. The Cutlass Salon returned, adopting its own fastback 2-door/4-door sedan bodystyle.

=== 1978-1980 ===
For 1978, Oldsmobile dropped the standard Cutlass line, offering the Cutlass Supreme/Cutlass Calais coupes, Cutlass Salon fastbacks, and the Cutlass Cruiser station wagon. The standard engine was a 231 cubic-inch V6, producing 105 hp. Three engines were offered as an option, including a 260 cubic-inch V8 (110 hp), and either a 2-barrel or a 4-barrel 305 cubic-inch V8 (145 hp and 160 hp, respectively).

For 1979, a minor exterior revision was made to the taillamps (removing the lighted Oldsmobile Rocket emblem from the center). The powertrain underwent a larger revision; along with dropping the 2-barrel 5.0 L V8, the model line added a 4.3 L diesel V8 (a 5.7 L diesel was used for Cutlass Cruisers).

For 1980, several changes were made to the model line. Along with a exterior facelift (with two-door coupes adopting a four-headlight front fascia), the interior was fitted with redesigned seats. Oldsmobile began to phase out its unpopular Cutlass Salon line, replacing the four-door fastback with a four-door sedan. Wearing the rear doors of the station wagon and the notchback profile of the two-door coupe, the new four-door marked the return of the Cutlass nameplate (after a two-year hiatus), replacing the base Cutlass Salon. The Cutlass LS served as a four-door Cutlass Supreme, slotted below a four-door Cutlass Brougham.

==== Limited editions ====
After a four-year hiatus, the Hurst/Olds (also known as the W-30) made its return for 1979. Assembled entirely by Oldsmobile, the 1979 Hurst/Olds was derived from the Cutlass Calais coupe, all painted with the traditional white or black trimmed with gold paint. In total, 2,499 examples were produced; all units sourced their 5.7 L L34 Rocket V8 V8 from the full-size Oldsmobile line. Though all engines were paired with a three-speed Turbo-Hydramatic transmission, the Hurst/Olds included a Hurst Dual/Gate shifter (facilitating manual control over gear shifting).

For 1980, the W-30 option package continued, as the Oldsmobile 442 was shifted from the fastback Cutlass Salon to the notchback Cutlass Calais coupe body. With the exception of the Dual/Gate shifter, the 442 shared its drivetrain with the 1979 Hurst/Olds, along with white or black paint trimmed with gold as a secondary color (styled slightly differently) and W-30 decals. In total, there were 886 units produced.

=== 1981-1988 ===
For 1981, GM underwent a mid-cycle redesign of its A-body coupe lines. Though visibly similar to its 1980 counterpart, the 1981 Cutlass Supreme saw extensive upgrades to its aerodynamics, including flush-mounted rear side glass, a "shovel-nose" front fascia panel, and a raised decklid height; overall, air resistance was decreased by 15%. To further reduce emissions, gasoline engines were fitted with electronic controls. The Cutlass LS and Brougham (and Cutlass Cruiser) underwent a separate facelift, adopting a front fascia in line with full-size Oldsmobiles; the rear taillamps were also redesigned. After outliving its four-door counterpart for a year, the two-door Cutlass Salon was retired for 1981.

1982 marked the launch of the front-wheel drive A platform, with Oldsmobile debuting the Cutlass Ciera sedan/coupe; the 1978 A-bodies redesignated as the G-body platform. The Cutlass line underwent several revisions, dropping the Cutlass and Cutlass LS sedan (in favor of the Cutlass Ciera) and introducing a four-door Cutlass Supreme; the Cutlass Cruiser Brougham continued, dropping the Brougham name.

For 1983, the grille was slightly revised, with the Cutlass Supreme dropping its 4-unit split in favor of the 2-unit split used by the Calais.

For 1984, the model line underwent a minor exterior revision, with both two-doors and four-doors adopting new grilles (the Calais adopting the grille of the Brougham); while the taillamps of the coupe were changed only slightly, the four-door reverted back to the design used from 1979-1980. The interior saw several changes, including a new steering wheel and the addition of electronically-tuned radios. The station wagon was retired, coinciding with the Cutlass Cruiser becoming part of the Cutlass Ciera line.

1985 marked further change to the model line, as the Cutlass Calais nameplate left the model line, becoming the N-body replacement for the Omega. Taking its place, Oldsmobile revived the Cutlass Salon as the touring-oriented version of the Cutlass Supreme; the 442 made its return as an option package for the Salon. The Cutlass Supreme Brougham continued as the luxury-oriented trim, adding a split-bench seat with plusher upholstery; externally, it was distinguished with separate hood ornaments.

1986 brought several detail changes to the model line, quietly led by the withdrawal of the diesel V8 engine option. Along with the addition of a center brake lamp, coupes received a slightly restyled grille (similar to the 1981 design). Instead of an option package, the 442 was elevated to a distinct model line (still based on the Cutlass Salon). Following the downsizing of the Oldsmobile Delta 88/Ninety Eight Regency, the Cutlass Supreme became the largest Oldsmobile sedan; alongside the Custom Cruiser station wagon, it remained the sole Oldsmobile offered with a V8 engine.

For 1987, the Cutlass Supreme coupe was fitted with a restyled front fascia; the "shovel-nose" design was fitted with a recessed grille and wraparound composite-style headlamps (moving the parking lamps from the bumpers to aside the headlamps). Again shared with its full-size lines, the steering wheel was redesigned (though the rest of the dashboard was largely carryover).

For 1988, the model line became the Cutlass Supreme Classic, dropping the 442 package, the Cutlass Salon, and the four-door sedan (replaced both by the Cutlass Ciera and the downsized 88/98); the 5.0L V8 became the only engine (dropping the 3.8L V6). The model line was offered in Classic and Classic Brougham trims, with the former offering the bucket seats and floor console of the former Cutlass Salon; the T-tops and sunroof option (introduced in 1978) remained available. In total, 27,678 were built; the final two-door Cutlass Supreme Classic rolled of the assembly line in Pontiac, Michigan in December 1987.

==== Limited editions ====
The Hurst/Olds reappeared on the Cutlass Calais coupe for two years, first in 1983 as the black over silver 15th anniversary, and then as the silver over black 1984 model. Both featured chrome wheels, red striping and a high output Oldsmobile 307 V8 with 4 barrel carburetor, dual muffler exhausts and Hurst's then new three stick Lightning Rods shifter (the latter eventually becoming a magnet for thieves.) All Hurst/Olds were automatics.

For 1985, Oldsmobile repackaged the Hurst/Olds as a revived 442, dubbed as the W42 option package. The powertrain was largely carryover from 1984 (with the exception of the three-stick shifter), retaining the high-output 5.0L Oldsmobile V8 and console-shifted automatic. The exterior was styled with two-tone paint (silver lower body color and gold striping), gold-trim styled-steel wheels, and 442 door panel emblems. For 1987, the 442 package was offered on both the Cutlass Supreme and Cutlass Salon (all trims except the Brougham).

==== Motorsport ====
While the 1978-1980 Cutlass Supreme was technically eligible for NASCAR cup competition, it was sold during the continued eligibility of its Colonnade-generation predecessor (effectively keeping it out of competition). It would ultimately be the 1981 model update that brought the downsized GM A-body into NASCAR racing. Though the Cutlass looked almost identical to the Buick Regal (which scored 35+ victories in the 1981 thru 1985 seasons), the Cutlass (like the Dodge Mirada) did not take one checkered flag during that period. By 1983, many teams moved away from the Cutlass Supreme to its GM divisional counterparts (Buick Regal, Pontiac Grand Prix, and Chevrolet Monte Carlo SS). This was a rude awakening to Oldsmobile, which was getting used to wins on the NASCAR circuit.

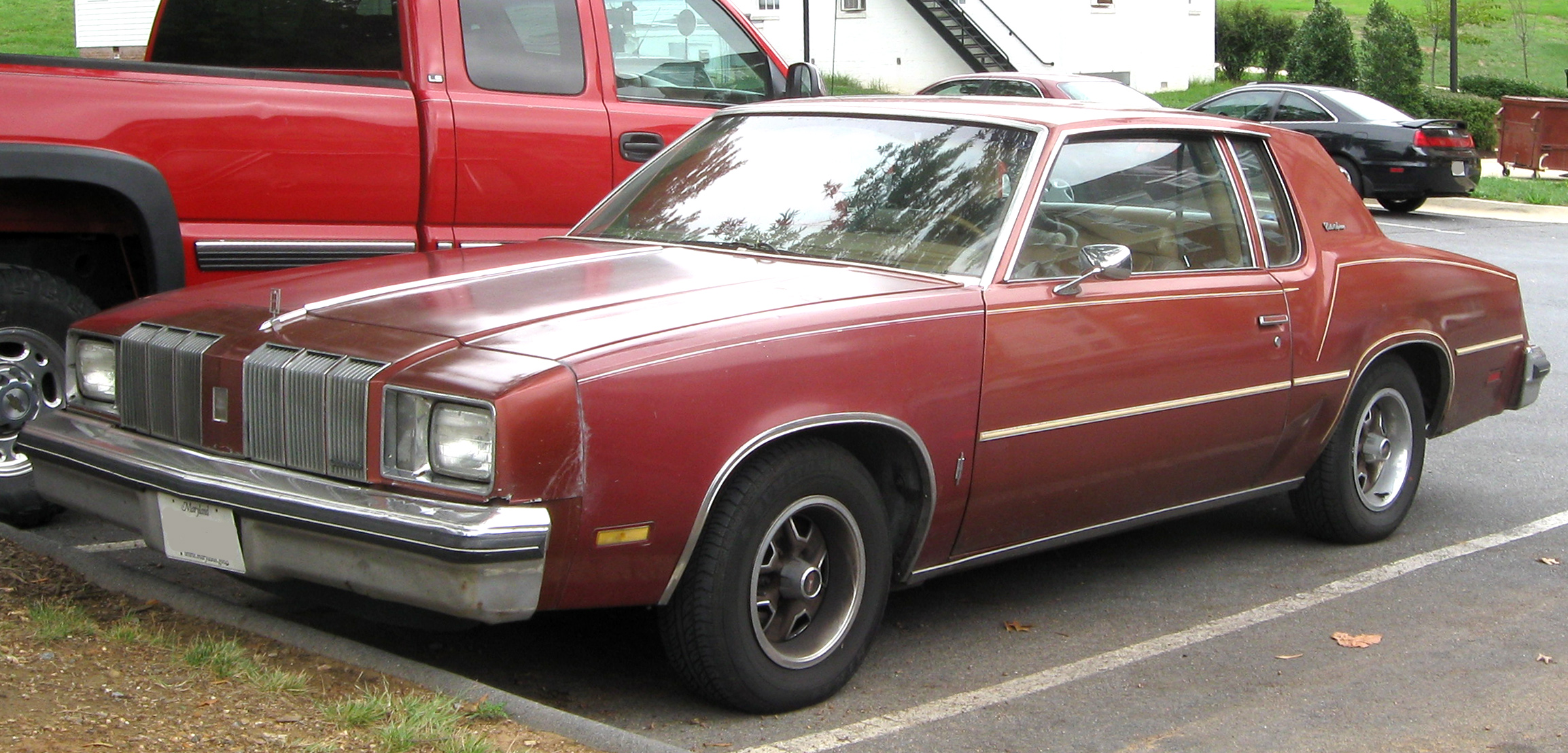
1978 Cutlass Supreme coupe

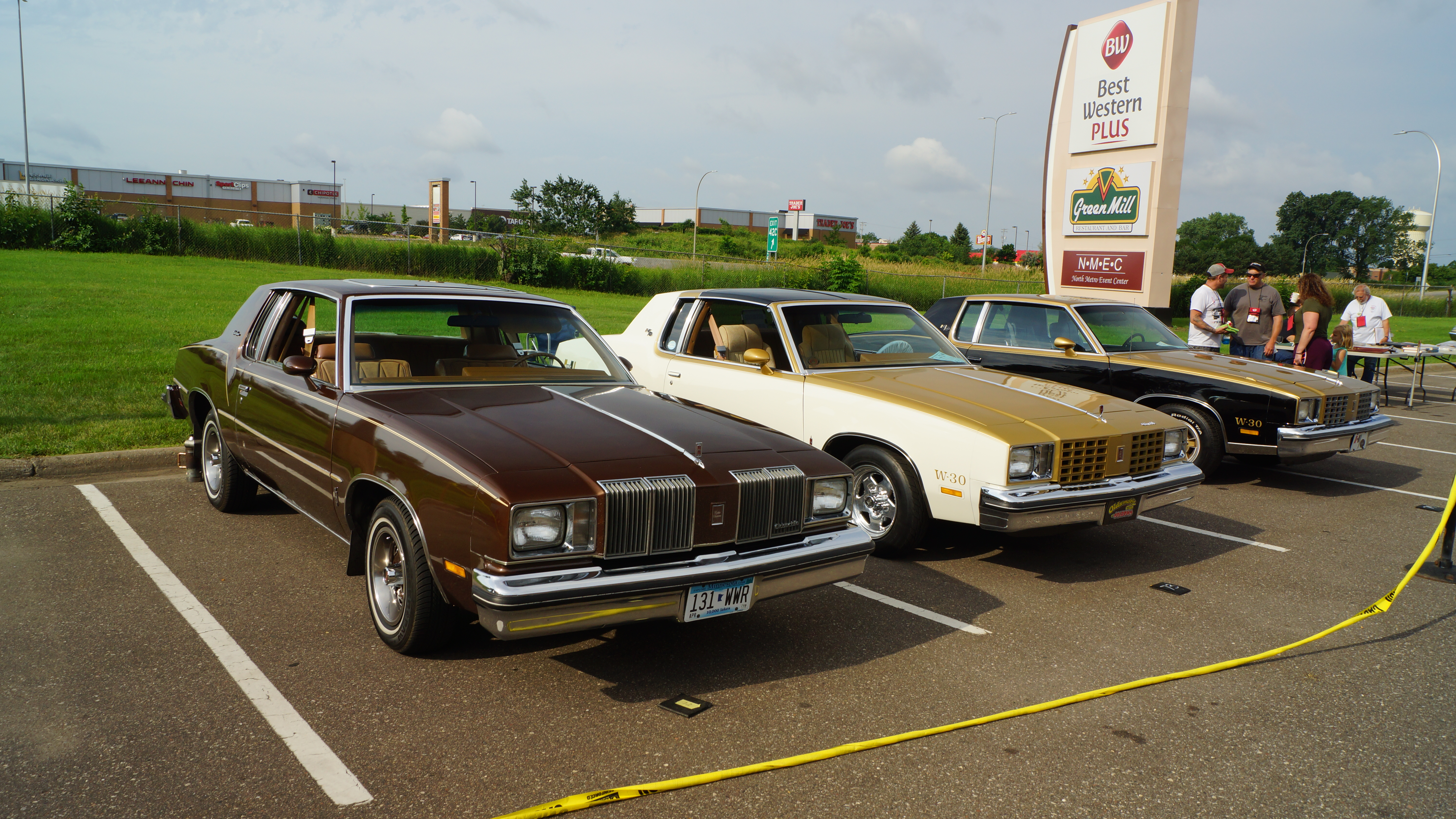
1979 Cutlass Supreme Coupe next to a pair of Hurst/Olds W-30's from the same year.

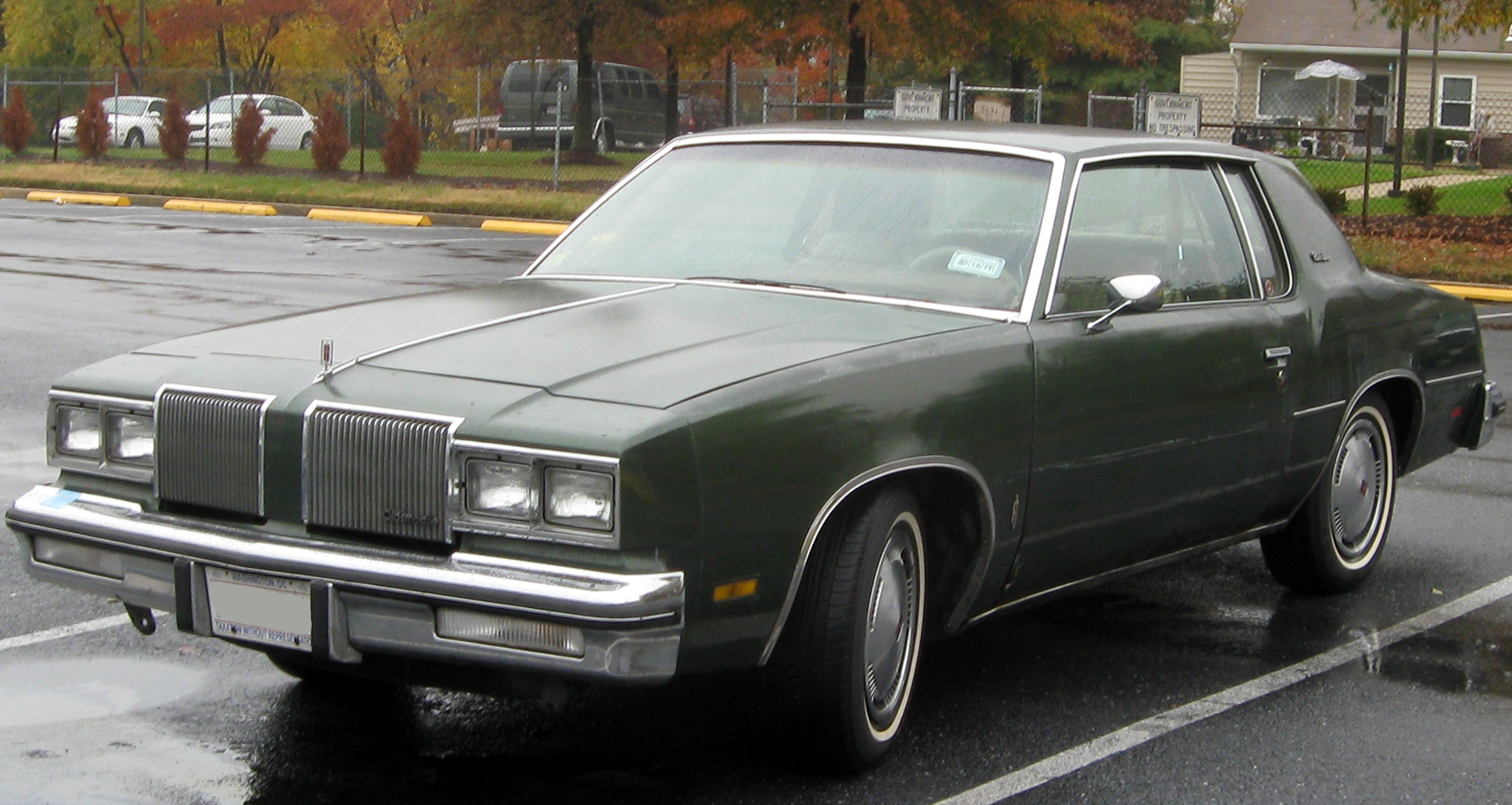
1980 Cutlass Supreme coupe

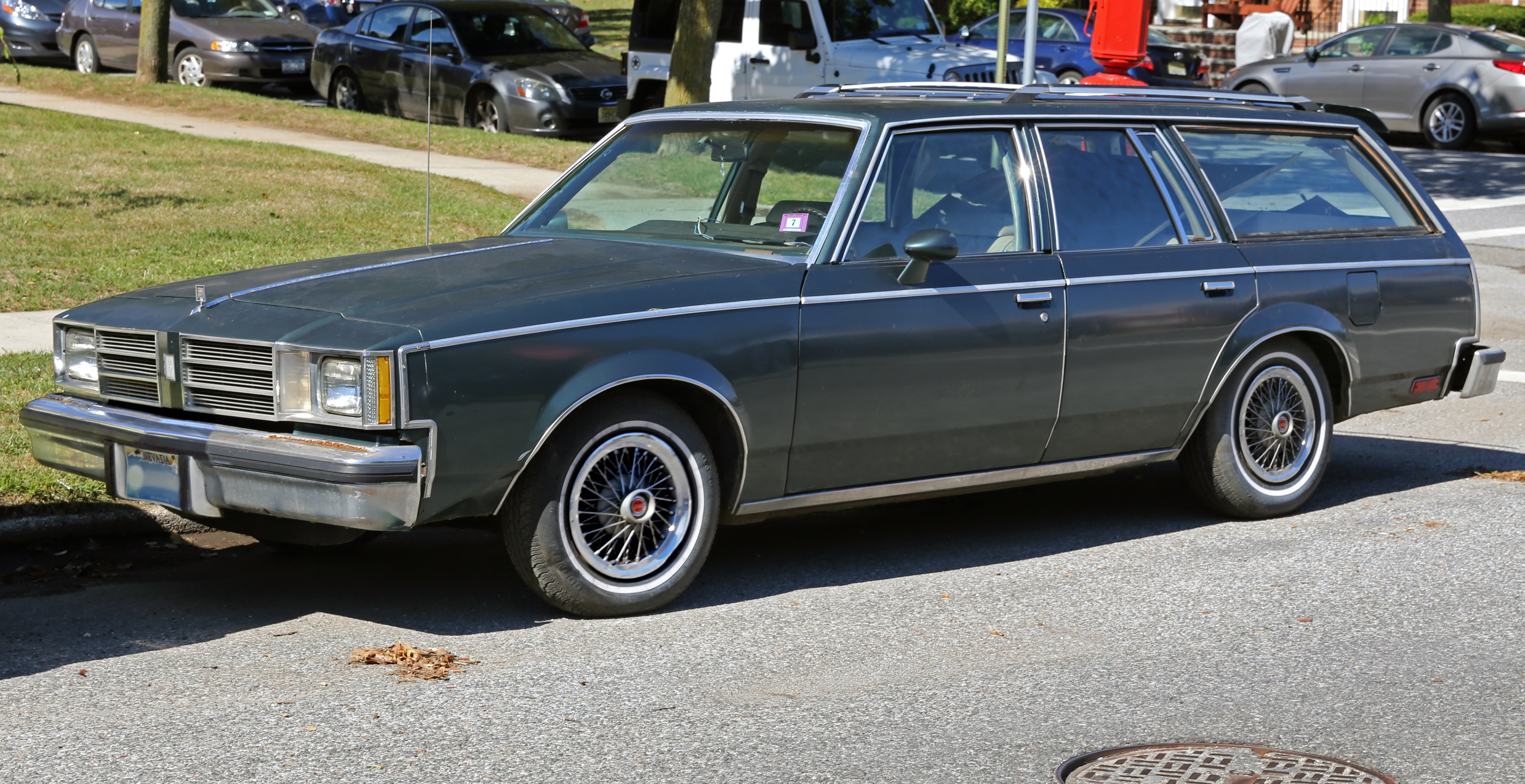
1981 Oldsmobile Cutlass Cruiser diesel

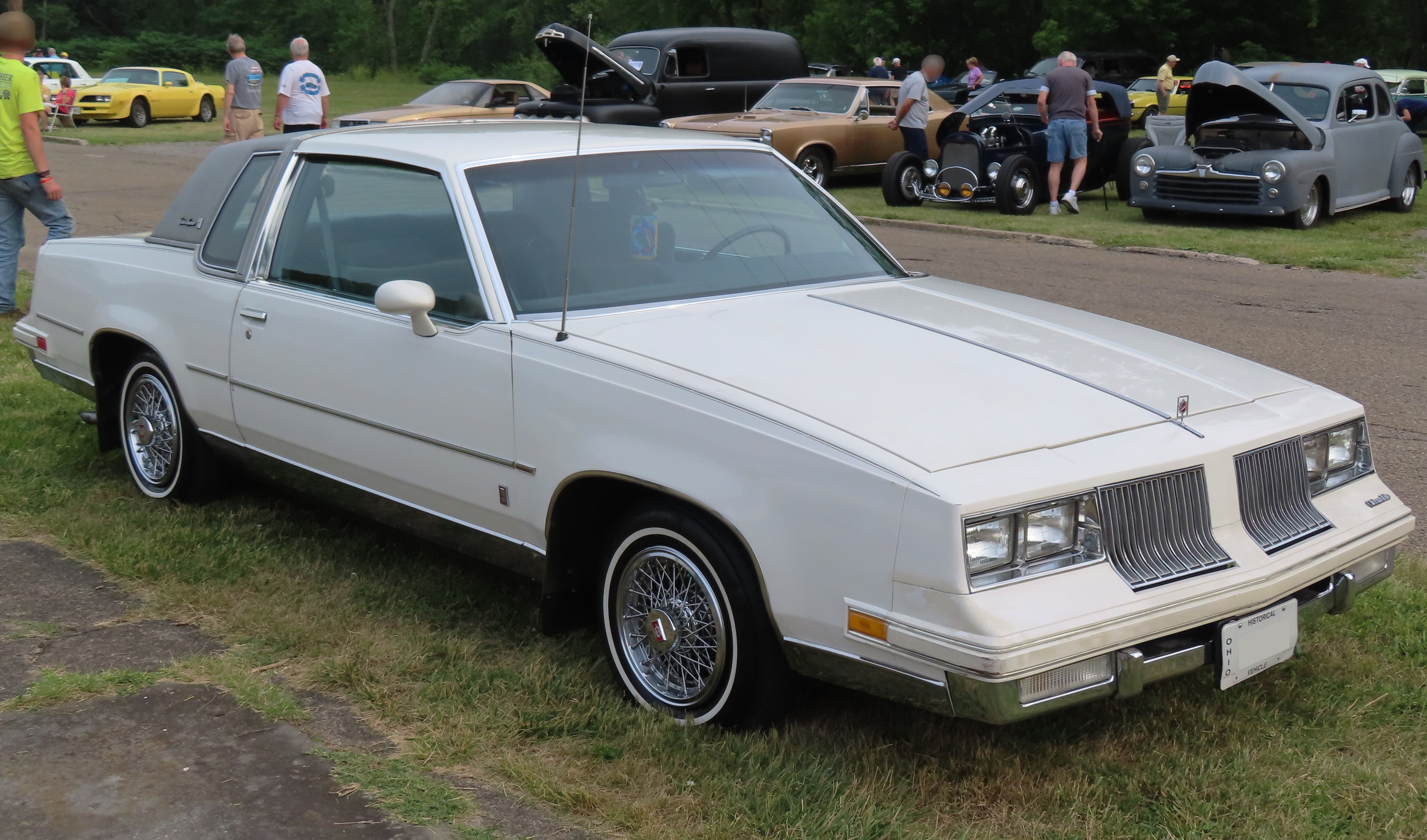
1984 Cutlass Supreme Brougham coupe

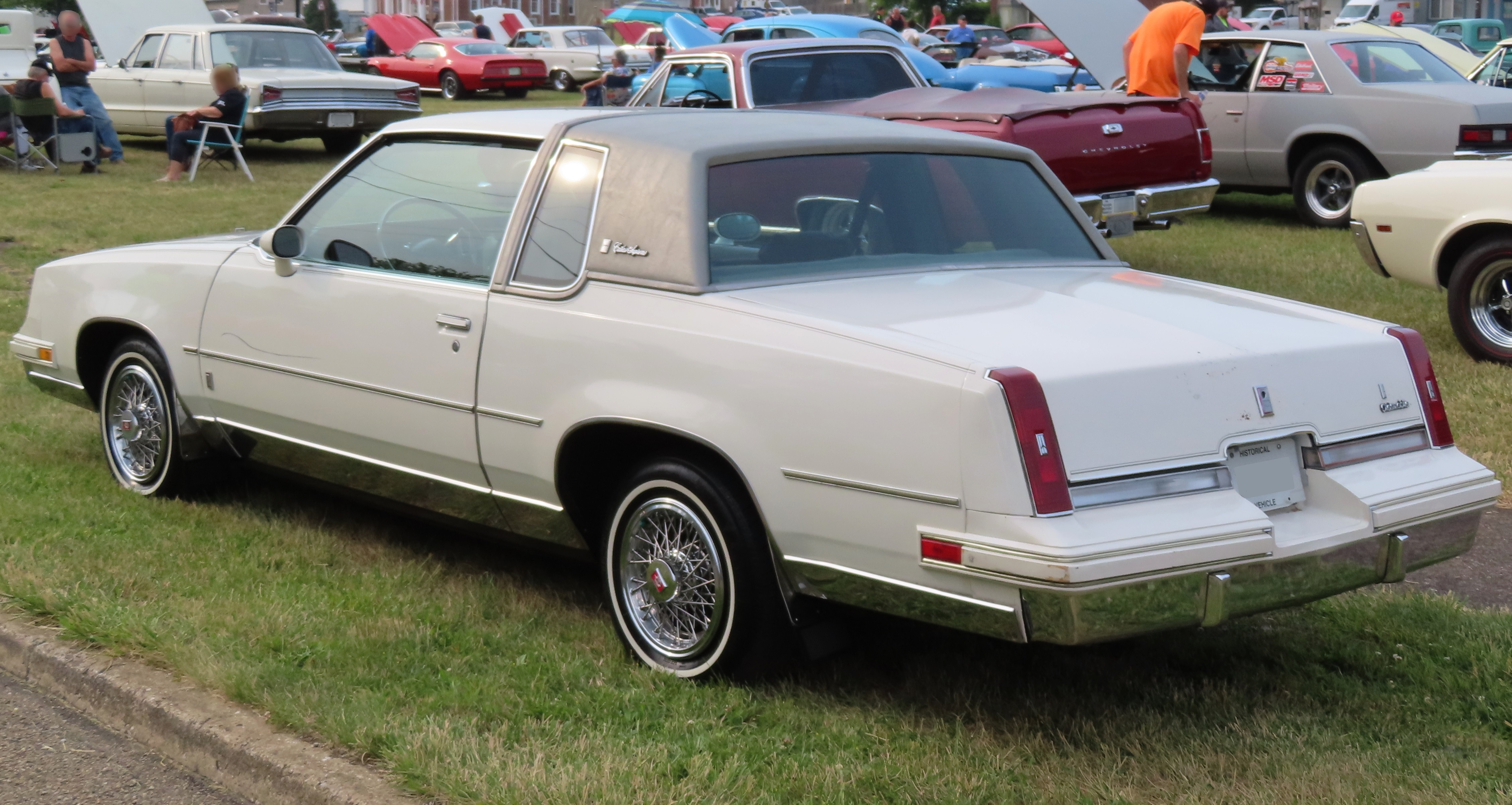
1984 Cutlass Supreme Brougham coupe

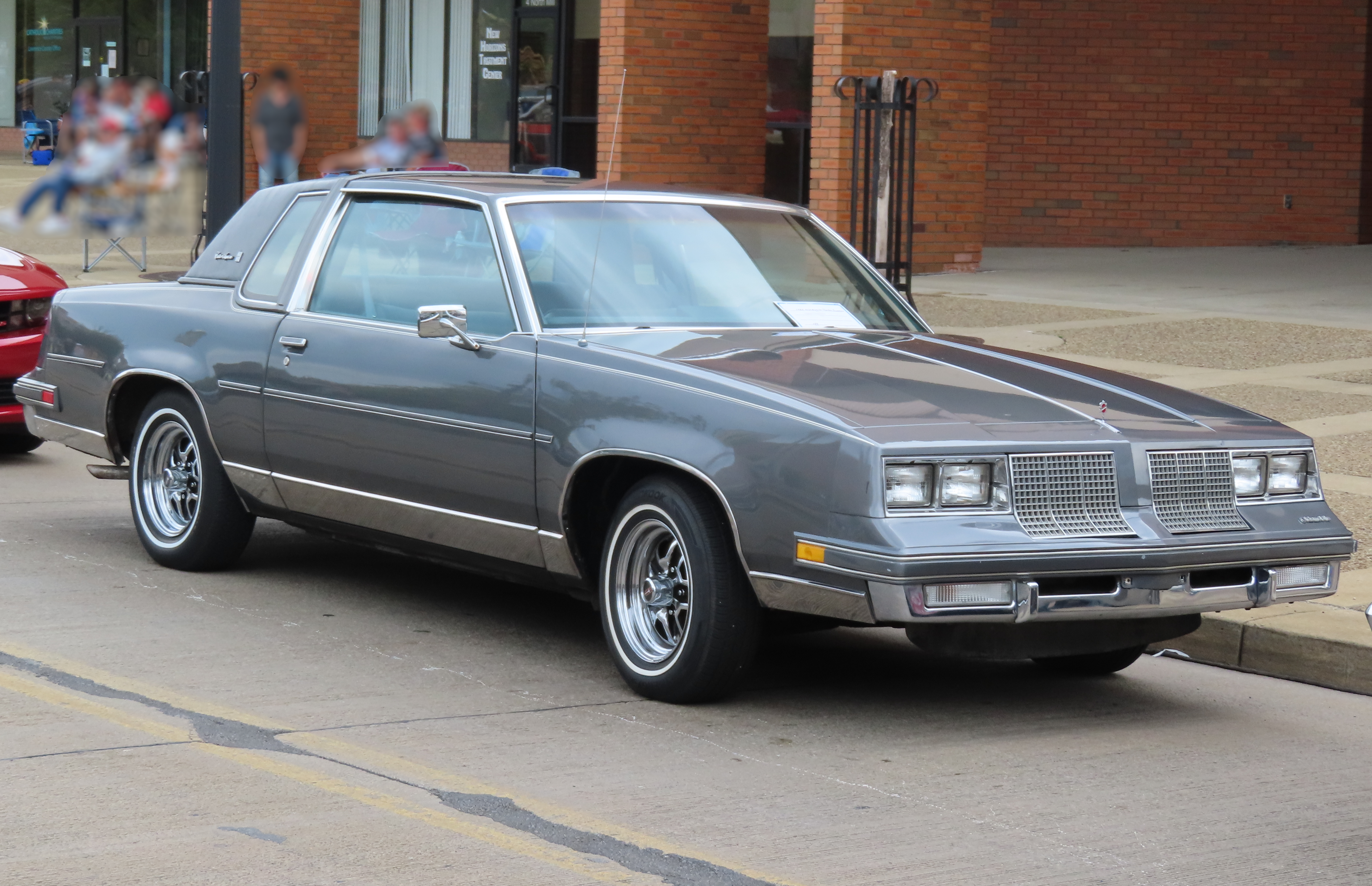
1985 Oldsmobile Cutlass Supreme Brougham coupe

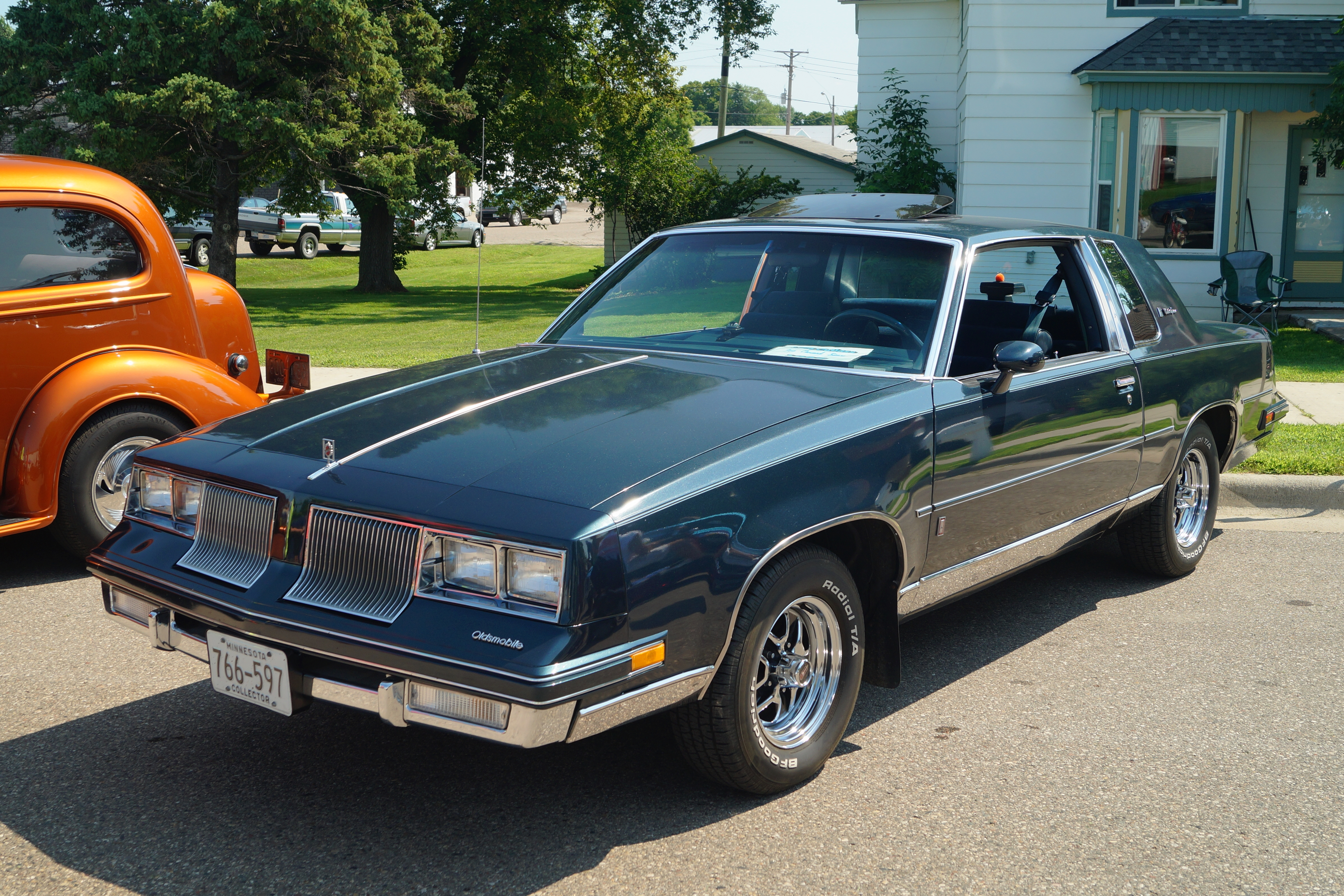
1986 Cutlass Supreme coupe

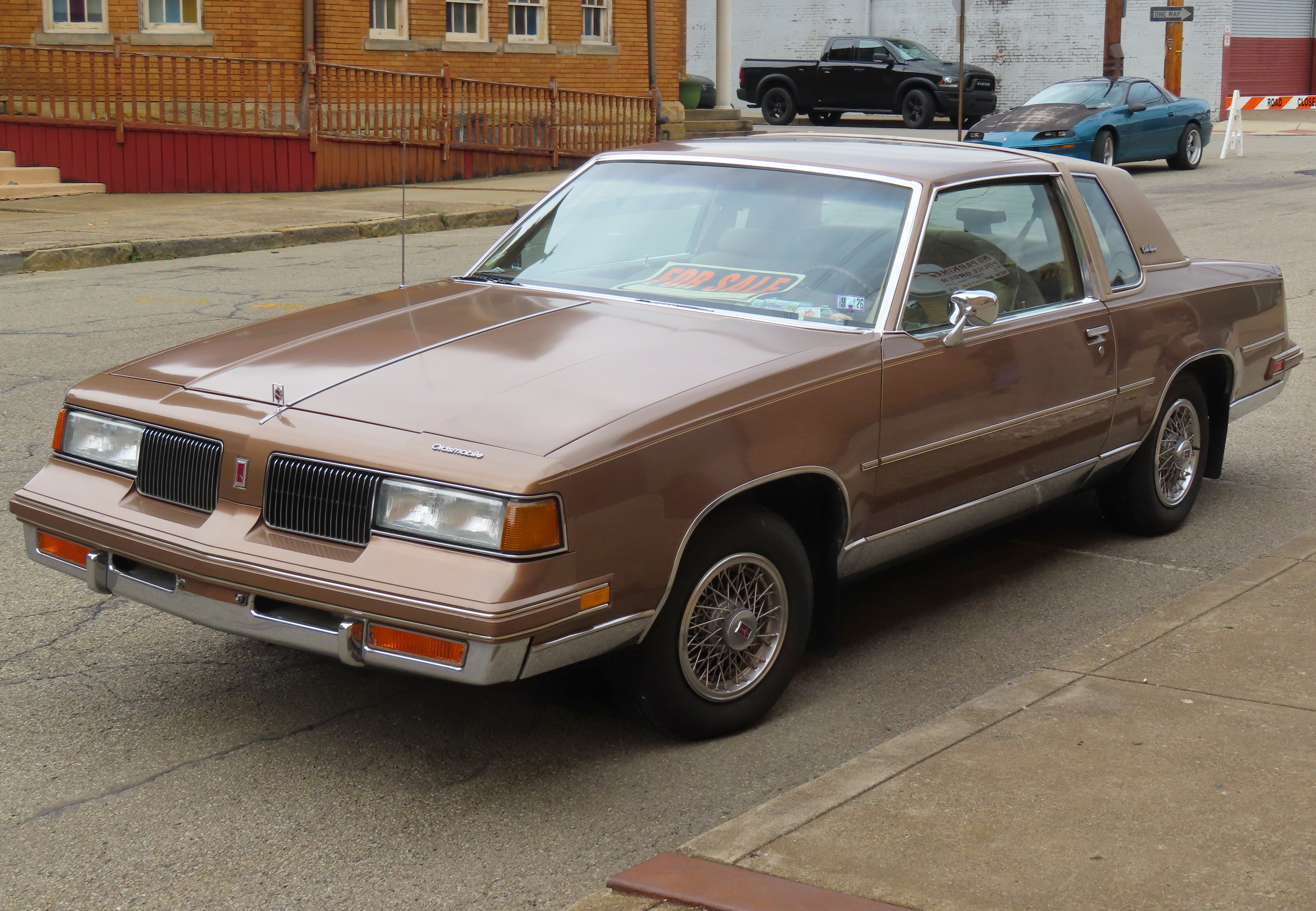
1987 Oldsmobile Cutlass Supreme coupe

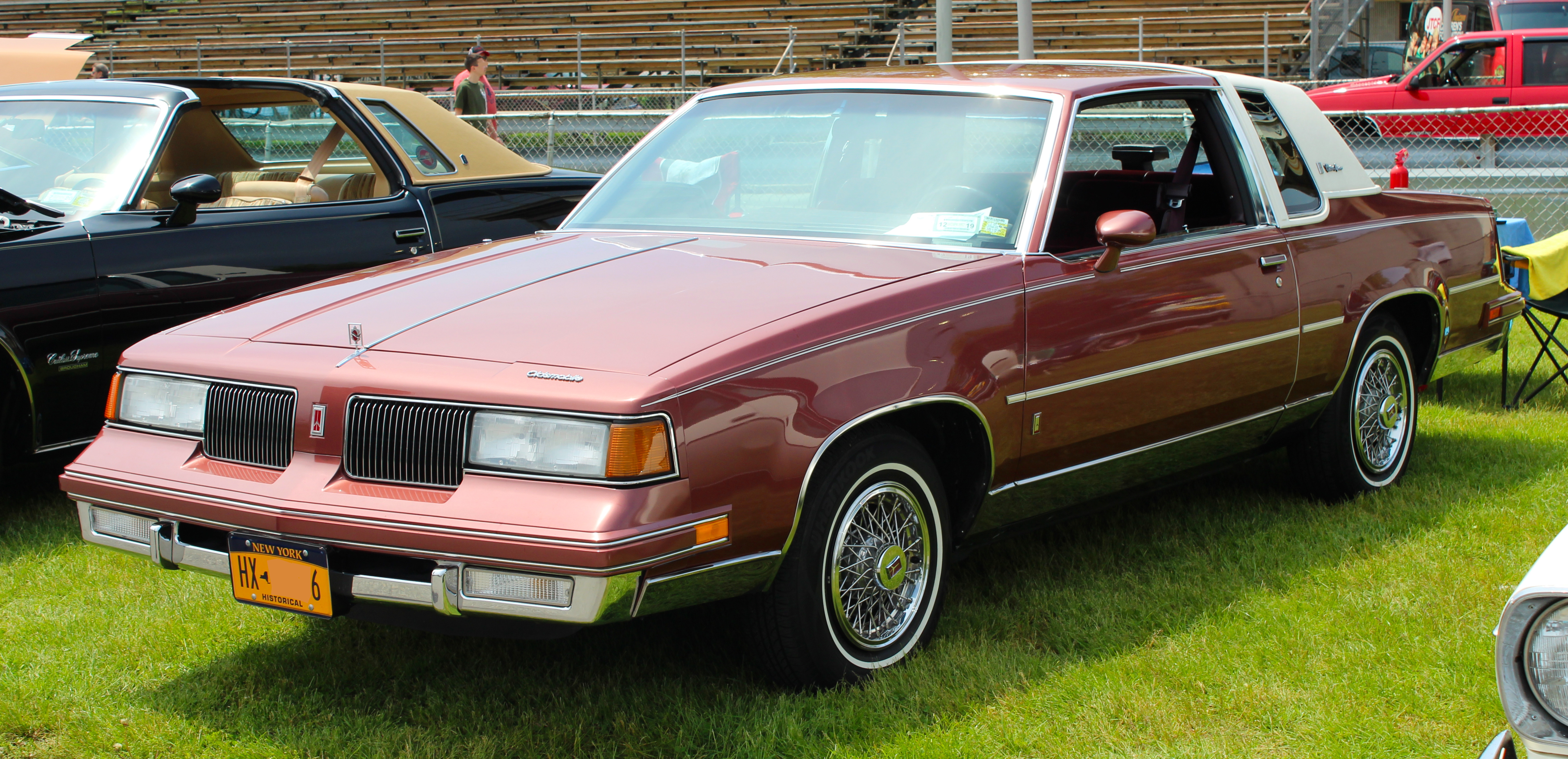
1988 Cutlass Supreme Classic

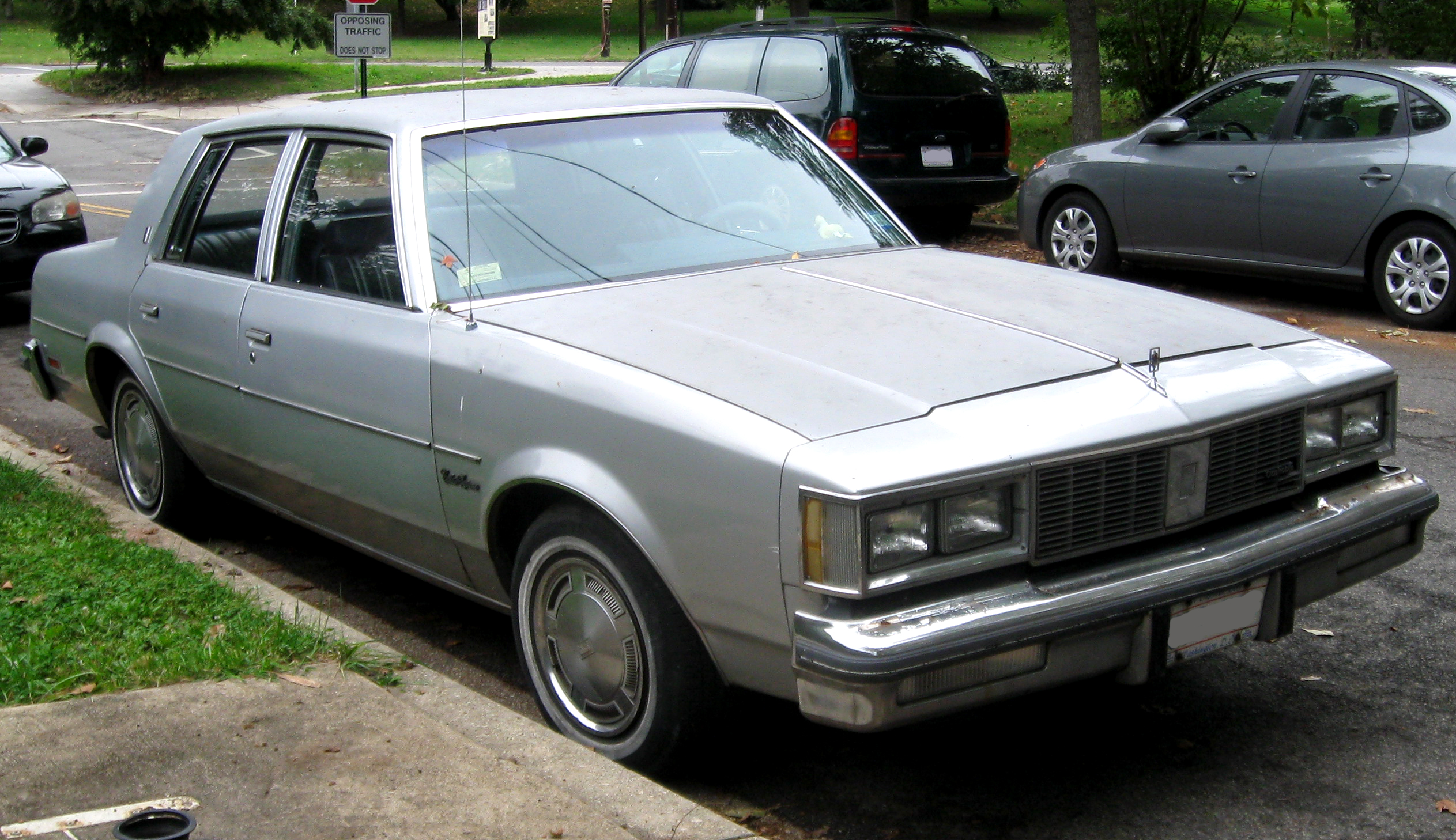
Oldsmobile Cutlass Supreme sedan

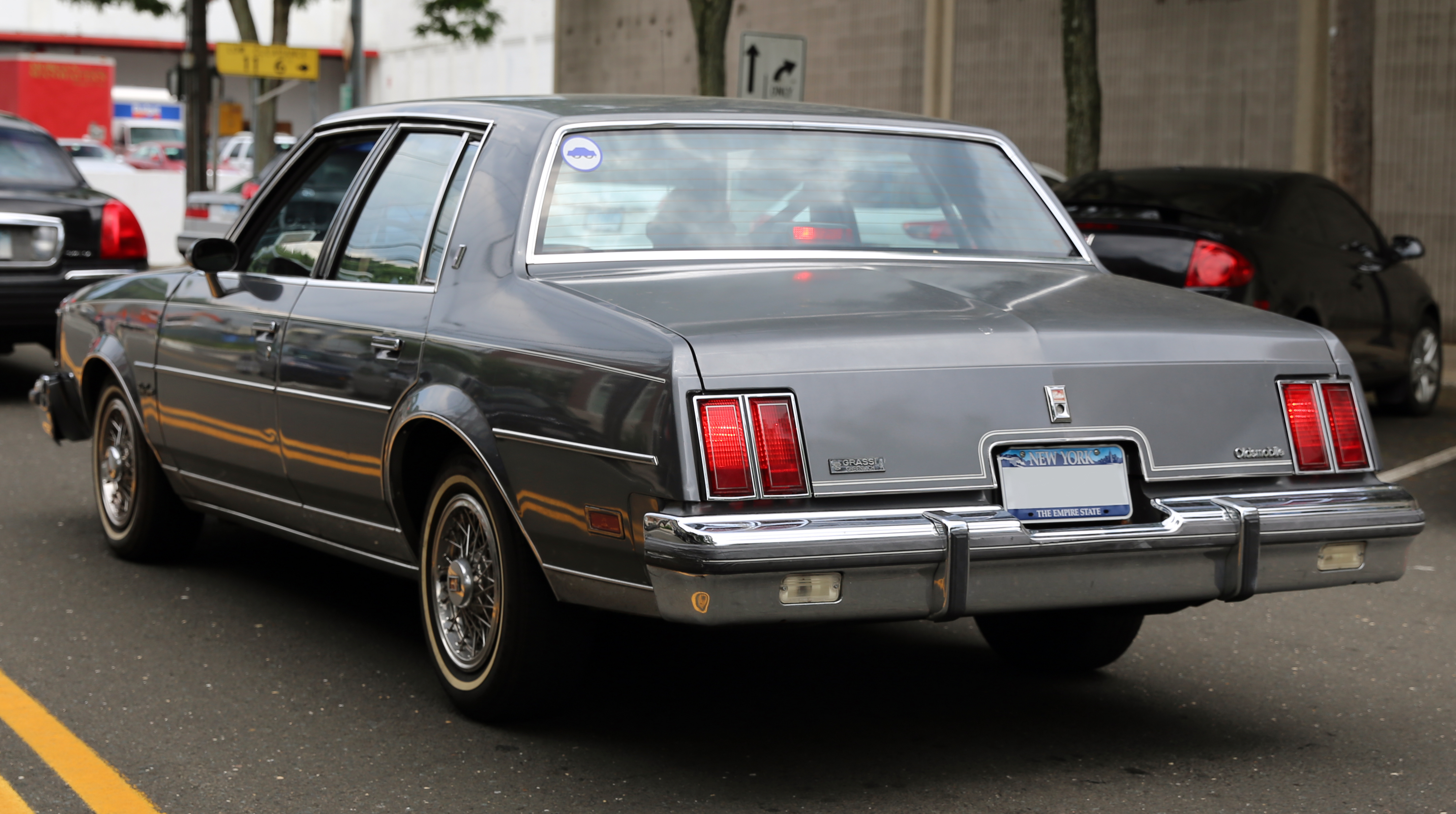
1986 or 1987 Cutlass Supreme sedan

== Fifth generation (1988–1997) ==
Fifth generation
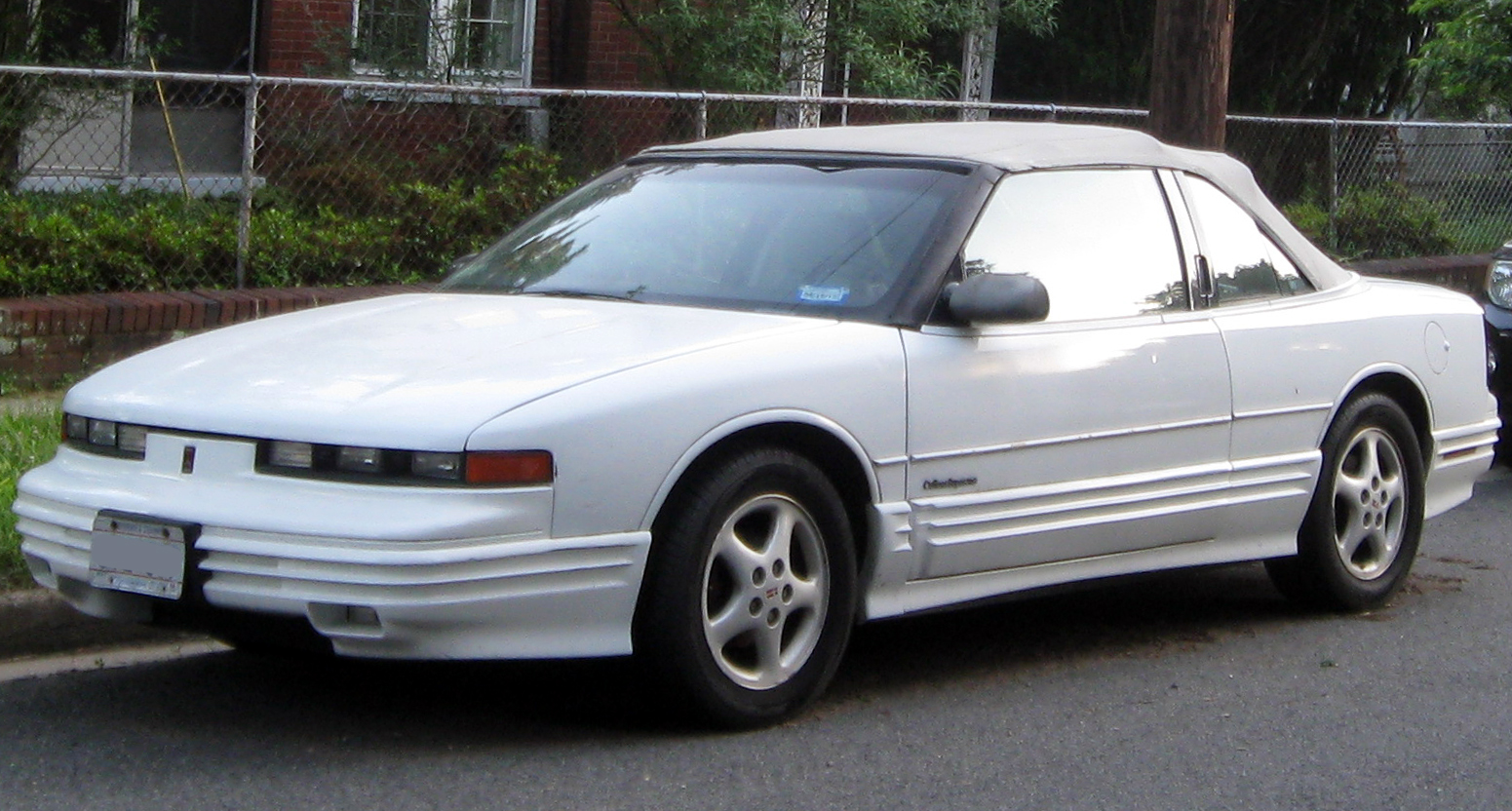
- 1992–1994 convertible

Overview
- Production: 1988–1997
- Assembly: Doraville, Georgia (Doraville Assembly; 1988–1995); Kansas City, Kansas (Fairfax Assembly; 1995–1997)
- Designer: Ed Welburn

Body and chassis
- Body style: 2-door convertible 2-door coupe 4-door sedan
- Layout: Transverse front-engine, front-wheel drive
- Platform: W-body
- Related: Buick Regal; Chevrolet Lumina; Pontiac Grand Prix

Powertrain
- Engine: 2.3 L Quad 4 I4; 2.8 L LB6 V6; 3.1 L LH0, L82 V6; 3.4 L LQ1 V6
- Transmission: 4-speed 4T60 automatic 4-speed 4T60-E automatic 5-speed Getrag manual

Dimensions
- Wheelbase: 107.5 in (2,730 mm)
- Length: 1988–89: 192.1 in (4,879 mm); 1990–91 2dr: 192.3 in (4,884 mm); 1990–91 4dr: 192.2 in (4,882 mm); 1992–95 2dr: 193.9 in (4,925 mm); 1992–95 4dr: 193.7 in (4,920 mm); 1996–97: 193.8 in (4,923 mm)
- Width: 1988–95: 71 in (1,803.4 mm); 1996–97 2dr: 71.5 in (1,816 mm); 1996–97 Sedan: 71.9 in (1,826 mm)
- Height: 1988–89: 52.8 in (1,341 mm); 1990–95 Coupe: 53.3 in (1,354 mm); 1990–95 4dr: 54.8 in (1,392 mm); 1990–91 Convertible: 54.3 in (1,379 mm); 1992–95 Convertible: 54.7 in (1,389 mm); 1996–97 2-dr: 53 in (1,346 mm); 1996–97 4dr: 53.7 in (1,364 mm)

A front-wheel-drive Cutlass Supreme based on the GM10 platform (W-body) was introduced as a 2-door notchback coupe mid-year during the 1988 production run, while the final year of Cutlass Supreme RWD coupes were still being produced. This new FWD model shared its 107.5 in (2,730 mm) wheelbase with the Pontiac Grand Prix, Buick Regal, and later Chevrolet Lumina. The 1988 and 1989 models were 2-door coupes. This body style proved to be a winner for NASCAR competition and it visited the victory circle 13 times between 1989 and 1992, when Oldsmobile ended its racing program. A 4-door notchback sedan was added to the lineup in 1990 and was originally meant to replace the Cutlass Ciera, however, as the Ciera was still selling strongly, it remained in production alongside the Supreme as a lower priced model until 1996. In addition to the sedan, a 2-door convertible was also introduced for 1990. Models included base (later called S), SL, and the sporty International Series. Throughout its run, the convertible was especially popular and considered a separate trim level.

International Series models could be equipped with unique features such as quad bucket seats with dual center consoles, a driver information system and a heads-up display. A very rare Muncie 5-speed manual transmission option was paired first with the 2.8 L (170 cu in) 60° V6 in 1988 and 1989. In 1990, a revised Getrag 5-speed manual transmission option was available for the high-output LG0 Quad 4 I4 and the DOHC 3.4 L (210 cu in) 60° V6 in 1991 and 1992. The entire line was restyled for 1992, with coupes and convertibles gaining distinctive "mini-quad" headlamps shared with the Pontiac Grand Prix coupe. A driver's side airbag became standard in 1994, and a new ergonomically curved dashboard with dual airbags debuted in 1995, the same year the front seatbelts were moved from the front doors to the B-pillars.

The trim levels and the lineup were gradually pared down over time. The Quad 4 engine was last produced during the 1991 model year; the manual transmission option during 1992; the International Series during 1993; the S model during 1994; the convertible during 1995; and the 3.4 L V6 engine option during 1996. The Cutlass Supreme ceased production at the end of the 1997 model year. That same year, an N-body Cutlass (actually a badge-engineered Malibu) was introduced to replace the Ciera, but this model lasted just three years. The Cutlass Supreme's place in the Oldsmobile line was taken by the 1998 Intrigue, built on the next version of the W platform. The Cutlass Supreme ended production on April 24, 1997.

The W-body Cutlass Supreme was built in Doraville, Georgia from 1988 to 1995, and at the Fairfax Plant in Kansas City, Kansas from 1996 to 1997. The first 1988 Cutlass Supreme rolled off the assembly line on January 13, 1988. The last Cutlass Supreme convertible was completed on February 15, 1995. The reason for this is that the last 34,743 cars built in Doraville were sedans, the coupe production was sent to Fairfax, Kansas around March 1, 1995, and Cars and Concepts did not have a facility near Fairfax.

=== Indianapolis 500 Pace Car ===
In 1988 the Indianapolis Motor Speedway chose Oldsmobile to pace “The Greatest Spectacle in Racing”, with retired United States Air Force General Chuck Yeager behind the wheel. Traditionally a manufacturer builds many pace car replicas, often thousands. But in 1988 Oldsmobile chose to build only 50 Cutlass Convertible Indy Pace Car editions. All 50 (used on track on race day and in 500 Festival activities) were essentially hand-built. General Motors/Oldsmobile contracted Cars and Concepts of Brighton, Michigan to build each of these 50 unique cars. Following the race 50 very select Oldsmobile dealers were given the opportunity to purchase one of these cars. The price was set at full invoice price for a standard International Series coupe (~$14,000) plus the cost of the convertible conversion (an additional $13,997). Each was highly optioned, including the first-ever application of Heads Up Display in an American production vehicle developed by Hughes Electronics. After the 50 were in the dealers' hands across the country, General Motors discovered some issue with the certification of these one-off models. Each dealer was asked to return them to GM (where they were to be destroyed) and receive full credit of their purchase price. Most of the 50 were returned for credit, but a few dealers objected and kept their cars, leaving (by all accounts) less than 10 in the general population. Mr. Thomas Knobloch, a second-generation Oldsmobile dealer in Erie, Pennsylvania was one of those dealers who refused to relinquish his car. He instead held on to it as a collectible. Realizing its incredible rarity and place in both GM/Oldsmobile and Indy 500 history, he drove less than 800 miles (1,300 km) over his many years of ownership. The Knobloch family sold the car after his death.

=== Engines ===
Engine	Years	Power	Torque
2.8 L (173 cu in) LB6 V6	1988–1989	130 hp (97 kW)	170 lb⋅ft (230 N⋅m)
3.1 L (191 cu in) LH0 V6	1989–1993	140 hp (104 kW)	185 lb⋅ft (251 N⋅m)
2.3 L (138 cu in) LD2 I4	1990–1991	160 hp (119 kW)	152 lb⋅ft (206 N⋅m)
2.3 L (138 cu in) LG0 I4	1990	180 hp (134 kW)	160 lb⋅ft (217 N⋅m)
3.1 L (191 cu in) L82 V6	1994–1997	160 hp (119 kW)	185 lb⋅ft (251 N⋅m)
3.4 L (207 cu in) LQ1 V6	1991–1995	210 hp (157 kW)	215 lb⋅ft (292 N⋅m)
3.4 L (207 cu in) LQ1 V6	1996	215 hp (160 kW)	220 lb⋅ft (298 N⋅m)

=== Gallery ===
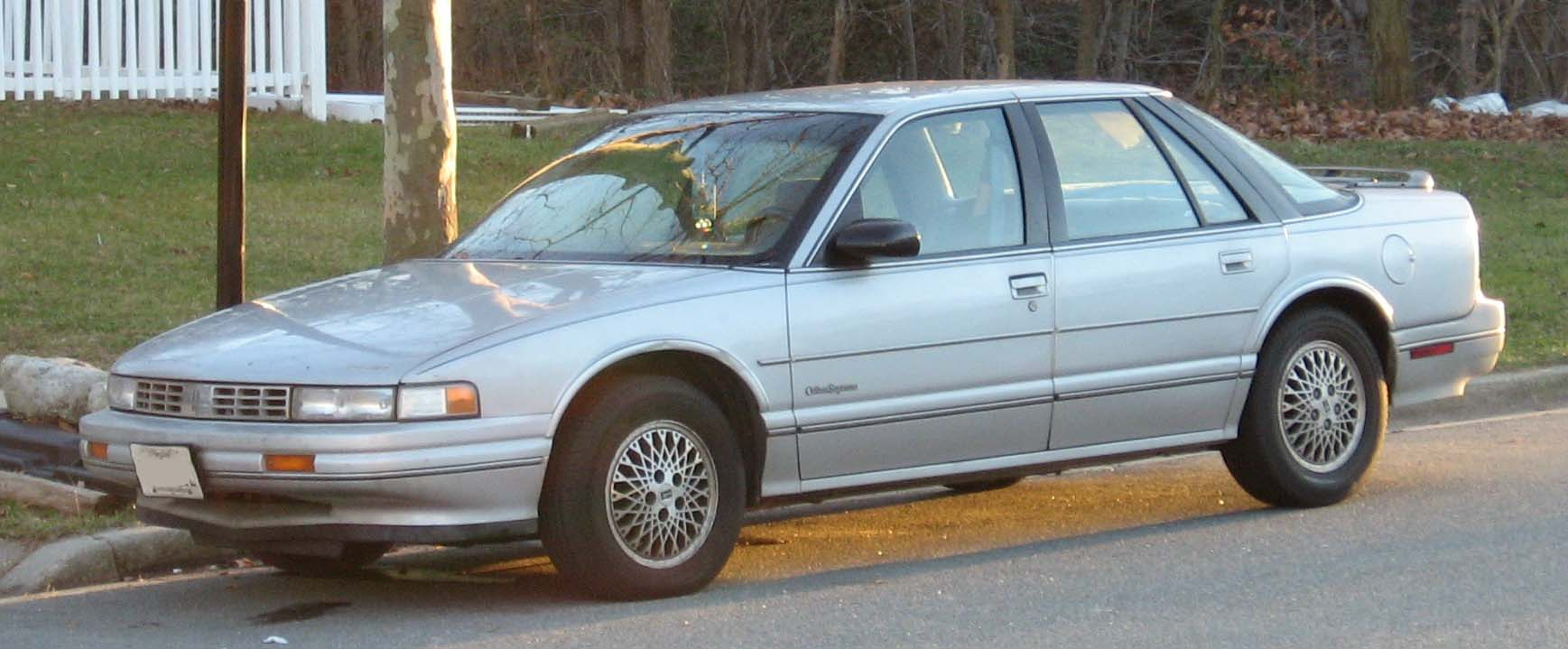
1990–1991 sedan

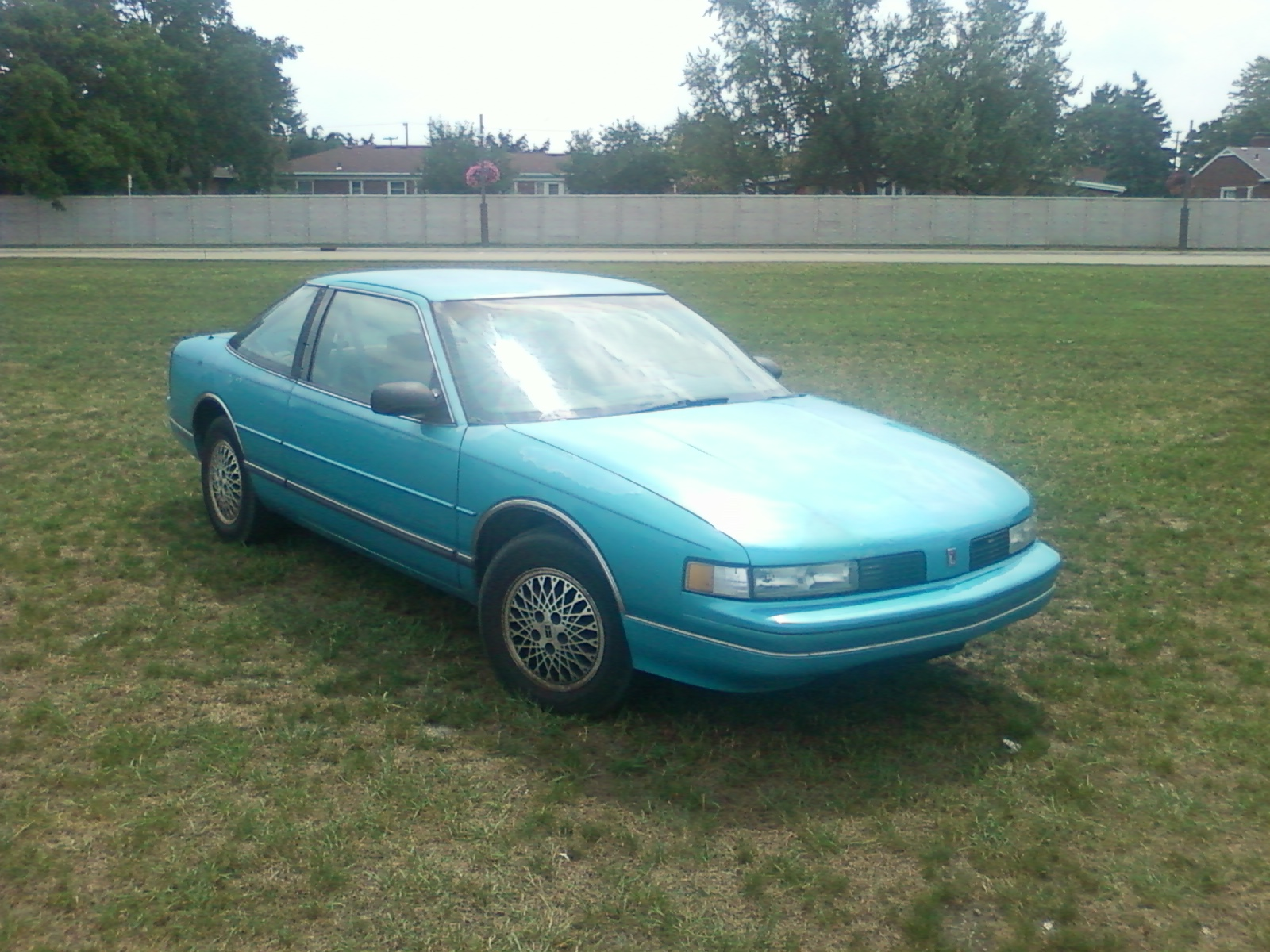
1990 coupe

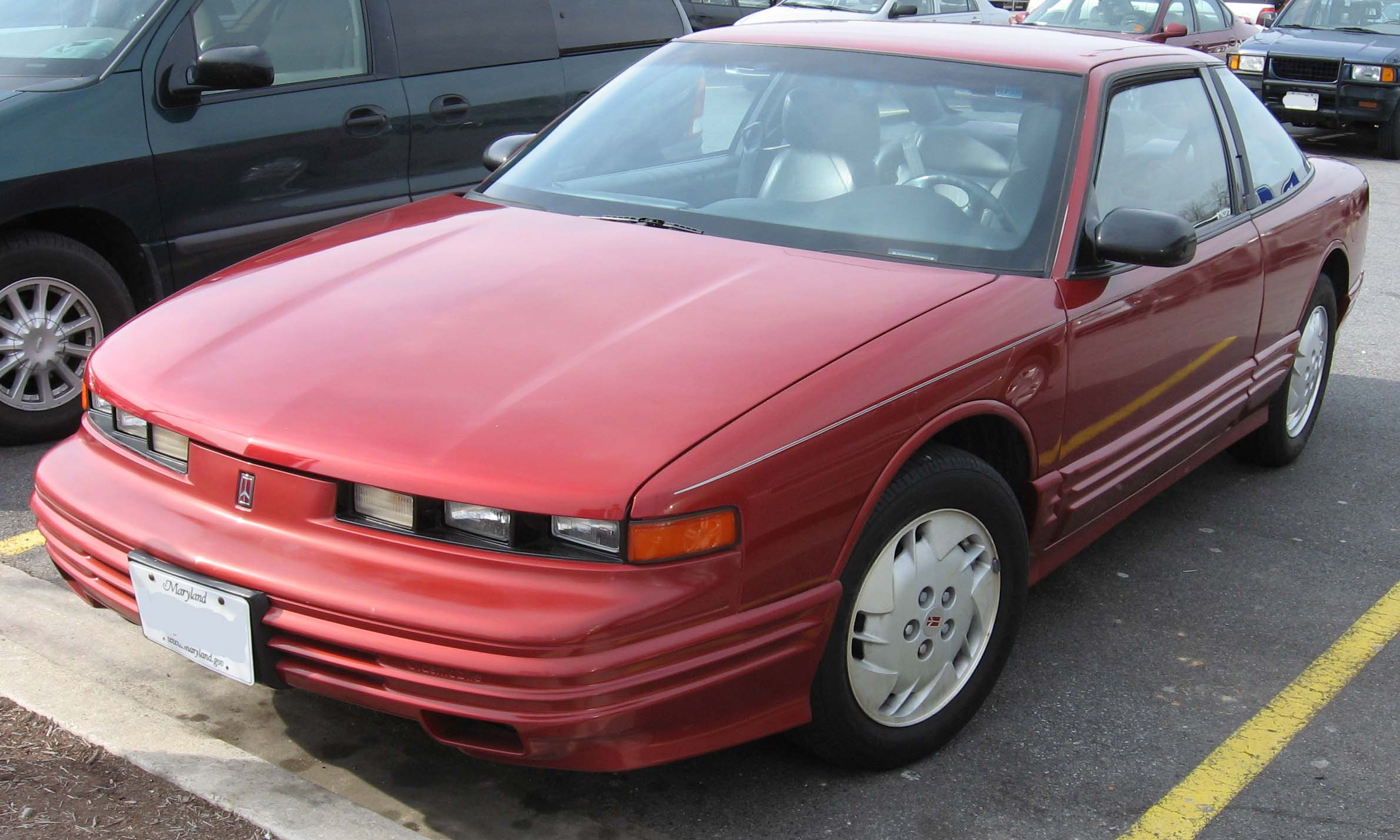
1995–1997 coupe

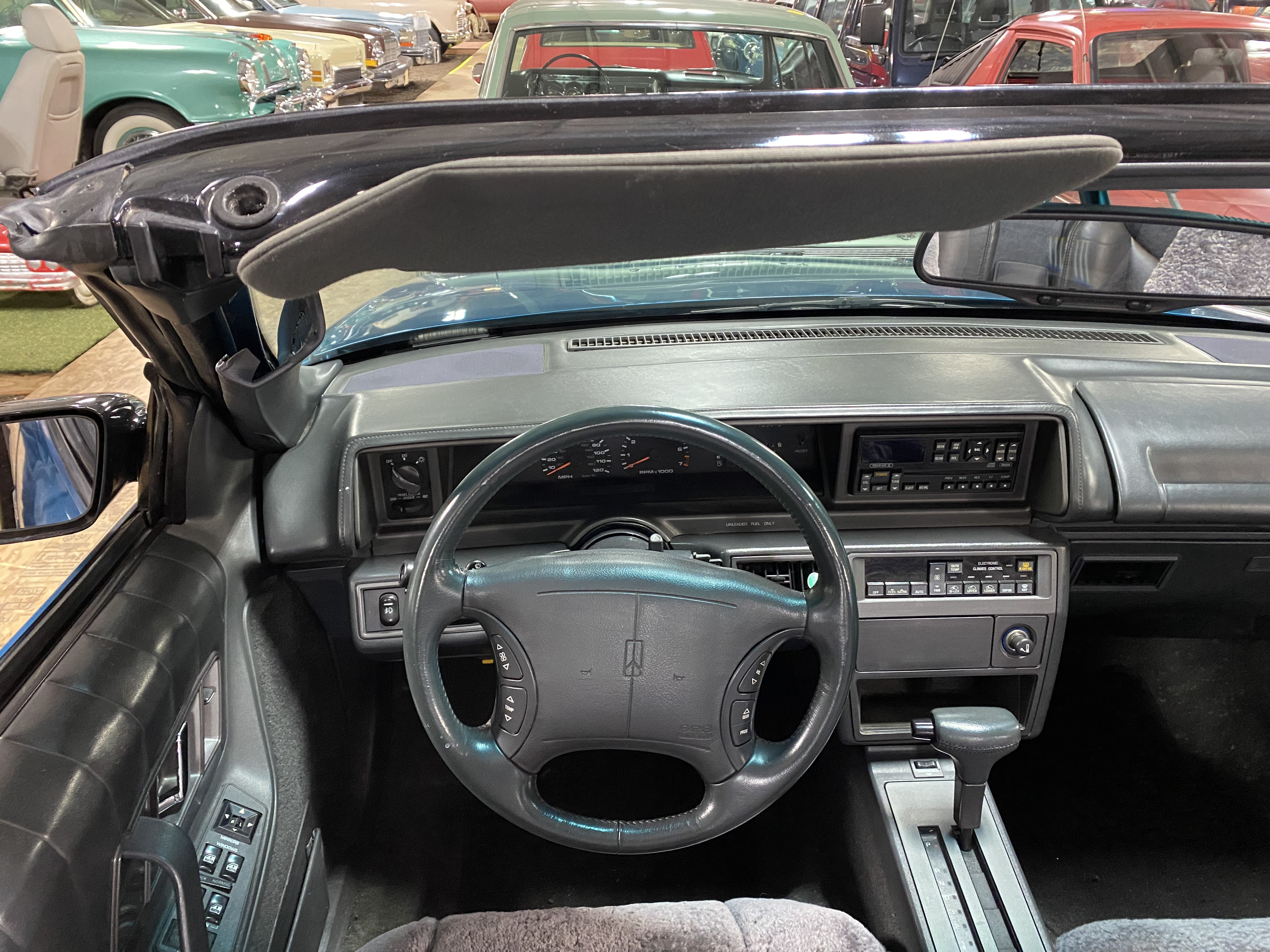
1994 convertible interior

== See also ==
- Oldsmobile Cutlass
- Oldsmobile Cutlass Ciera
- Oldsmobile Cutlass Calais
- Oldsmobile 442
- Oldsmobile Hurst/Olds
