= Camp Framingham =

Former Massachusetts National Guard camp

Coordinates: 42°17′45.42″N 71°24′41.53″W

Camp Framingham is a former Massachusetts National Guard camp that existed in 1873 to 1944 in Framingham, Massachusetts, also called Camp Dalton or Fort Dalton until 1898. The camp was used by all units of the Massachusetts Volunteer Militia as their summer training ground. The camp also contained a state arsenal where weapons and equipment was stored and issued to units. Fort Dalton was a training battery from 1883 to 1898, 138 feet (42 m) long with two 10 in (254 mm) Rodman guns and four siege mortars. Camp Framingham was used as a mobilization station during the Spanish–American War, in June 1916 during the Mexican border call-up and in the summer of 1917 during World War I. Other names for the camp in the Spanish–American War were Camp McGuinness and Camp Dewey. From May 1942 to December 1943, Headquarters, 181st Infantry Regiment was stationed with its companies serving on coast patrol duty for the Eastern Defense Command in New England. In 1948, Camp Framingham was transferred from the Military Division to the Massachusetts State Police. Today, the Massachusetts State Police and the Massachusetts Emergency Management Agency utilize portions of the former camp.

Musterfield Airport was located on the south end of the grounds, although it was not a military facility.

== See also ==
- List of military installations in Massachusetts
