= Framingham Assembly =

Motor factory in Massachusetts

- Operated: 1947 - August 1, 1989
- Coordinates: 42°15′45.79″N 71°24′42.78″W
- Industry: Automotive
- Products: Automobiles
- Owner: General Motors

Framingham Assembly was a General Motors factory in Framingham, Massachusetts which opened in 1947.

== History and models ==
The plant was built on the location of Framingham Airport, and ground was broken in 1945. The plant cost $12 million ($214,602,588 in 2025 dollars) and was one of three new plants that year. At one point, the Framingham Assembly plant was one of the largest automotive manufacturing plants in the United States, employing over 5,000 workers from Massachusetts, Rhode Island, and New Hampshire.

The first vehicle, produced on 26 February 1948, was a Buick, with 23,388 more produced that first year. The factory was used by "BOP" (Buick, Oldsmobile, Pontiac) and was under the management of GM's newly created Buick-Oldsmobile-Pontiac Assembly Division created in 1945. The factory had produced 697,574 cars by 1959. In August of that year, it became part of Fisher Body, producing Chevrolet, Pontiac, and Oldsmobile cars.

The factory was re-purposed again in May 1968, changing from separate Fisher Body and Chevrolet Division operations to a combined operation under the new GM Assembly Division, to produce the Chevrolet Chevelle and Pontiac Le Mans. The Pontiac GTO was added in 1969. The Buick Skylark and Oldsmobile Cutlass were added in 1970. In 1981, the Chevrolet Celebrity and Pontiac 6000 were produced, with the Oldsmobile Cutlass Ciera added for the 1983 model year.

== Closure ==
The Framingham location was the center of several contentious tug-of-wars between Governor Michael Dukakis and local politician Anthony M. Colonna. After the town refused to sell General Motors a 35-acre (140,000 m^{2}), town-owned piece of property GM desired for the construction of a new paint and plastics facility, Dukakis used the state's power of eminent domain to take the property from the town and sell it to GM so the company could construct the $224 million facility ($875,282,714 in 2025 dollars). Colona, head of the town department public works and a powerful local politician, had desired a new, unified DPW facility to be constructed on the site. After the taking, state officials and executives at GM claimed that Colonna used his political influence in the community to delay the company's expansion of the facility and drum up support against the company.

When the facility was closed, GM stated that it was due primarily to a slowdown in the economy as well as the relatively small size of the facility. However, GM spokesperson Mark Leddy stated that local officials in Framingham were also partially to blame, declaring "You look at your labor climate, your relationship with the community and the quality of product being built at the plant" when explaining why the company chose to shutter the unit.

The plant was idled on October 4, 1982, with a single shift recalled on March 14, 1983. The second shift started again on December 12, 1983. The factory was closed permanently on August 1, 1989.

== Current use ==
The facility is now the location of an ADESA automobile, truck, and boat warehouse and live auction site. The company claims that the facility is the largest indoor auction house in the world, capable of housing 10,000 autos and 4,000 people.

Framingham Assembly was located just South of downtown Framingham at Loring Drive and Western Avenue. The address of the ADESA auction site is 63 Western Ave.

A small landfill formerly used by General Motors at the site still exists and is part of the "Old GM", the leftover portions of the company after the 2009 bankruptcy. The administrative trust overseeing the former corporate assets has the property up for sale as of June 2012, but does not expect a buyer due to the nature of the facility.

== See also ==
- General Motors Companion Make Program
- List of GM factories
