= Framingham Airport (1931–1945) =

- IATA: none; ICAO: none

Summary
- Operator: Public
- Location: Framingham, Massachusetts
- Built: Unknown
- In use: 1931-1945
- Occupants: Public
- Elevation AMSL: 169 ft / 52 m
- Coordinates: 42°15′45.96″N 71°24′41.53″W
- Interactive map of Framingham Airport

Framingham Airport was an airfield operational in the early-20th century in Framingham, Massachusetts, replacing an earlier airport in town. It later became the location of the Framingham Assembly in 1947.
