= Framingham Airport (1923–1932) =

- IATA: none; ICAO: none

Summary
- Operator: Public
- Location: Framingham, Massachusetts
- Built: Unknown
- In use: 1923-1932
- Occupants: Public
- Elevation AMSL: 168 ft (51 m)
- Coordinates: 42°17′31.78″N 71°24′50.53″W
- Interactive map of Framingham Airport

Framingham Airport was an airfield operational in the early-20th century in Framingham, Massachusetts. It was located on the grounds of Camp Framingham, and was later replaced by an airport in the south side of town.
