= Pontiac Aztek =

Mid-size crossover SUV made by Pontiac

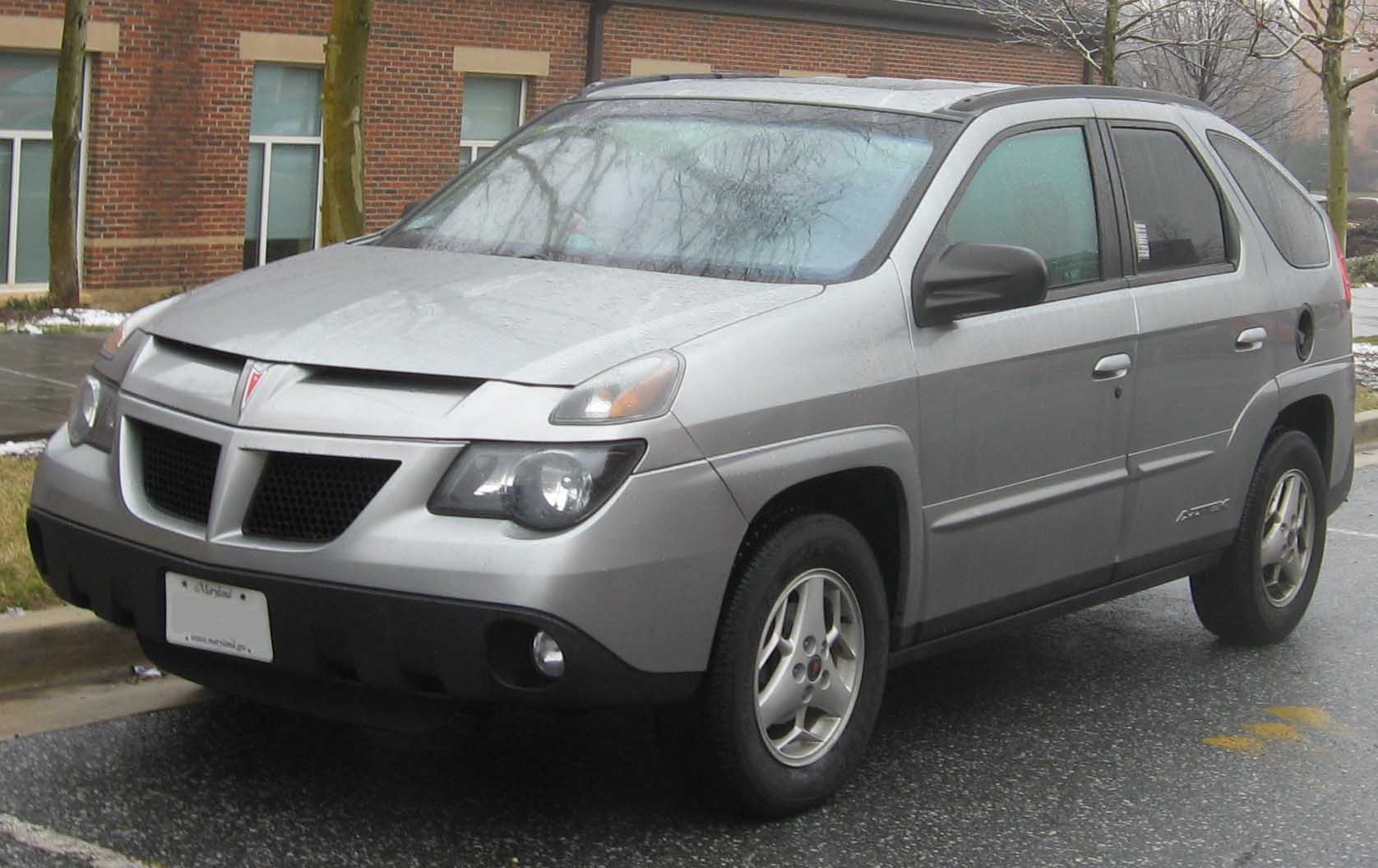

Overview
- Manufacturer: General Motors
- Production: July 2000 – December 2004
- Model years: 2001–2005
- Assembly: Mexico: Ramos Arizpe (Ramos Arizpe Assembly)
- Designer: Tom Peters (chief designer: 1997)

Body and chassis
- Class: Mid-size crossover SUV
- Body style: 5-door SUV
- Layout: Front-engine, front-wheel-drive or all-wheel-drive
- Platform: U-body/GMT250
- Related: Buick Rendezvous

Powertrain
- Engine: Gasoline: 3.4 L LA1 V6
- Transmission: 4-speed 4T65-E automatic

Dimensions
- Wheelbase: 108.3 in (2,751 mm)
- Length: 182.1 in (4,625 mm)
- Width: 73.7 in (1,872 mm)
- Height: 66.7 in (1,694 mm)
- Curb weight: 3,779–4,043 lb (1,714–1,834 kg)

Chronology
- Predecessor: Pontiac Sunrunner (Canada)
- Successor: Pontiac Torrent

The Pontiac Aztek is a mid-size crossover SUV marketed by General Motors introduced in 2000 for the 2001 to 2005 model years. As a four-door crossover with front-wheel drive and optional all-wheel drive, the Aztek featured a four-speed automatic transmission with a V6 engine. Marketed by Pontiac as a "sport recreational vehicle", the Aztek used a shortened platform shared with GM's minivans (e.g., the Pontiac Montana) featuring 94 cubic feet of cargo room with its rear seats removed. The design employed conventional rear outswing doors rather than sliding doors, and a split rear tailgate, the lower section formed with seat indentations and cupholders. Other features included a front center console that doubled as a removable cooler, optional rear stereo controls in the cargo area, optional sliding cargo floor with grocery compartments, and optional camping package with an attachable tent and air mattress.

== Original concept ==
First shown to the public in 1999, the Pontiac Aztek concept car was well received. It featured "Xtreme" futuristic styling and promised maximum versatility in support of a young and active lifestyle for its intended Generation X buyer demographic.

The Aztek went on sale in summer 2000 as a 2001 model.

The production edition of the Aztek was launched with the tagline "Quite possibly the most versatile vehicle on the planet" in conjunction with CBS's hit reality show Survivor in 2000.

== Styling ==
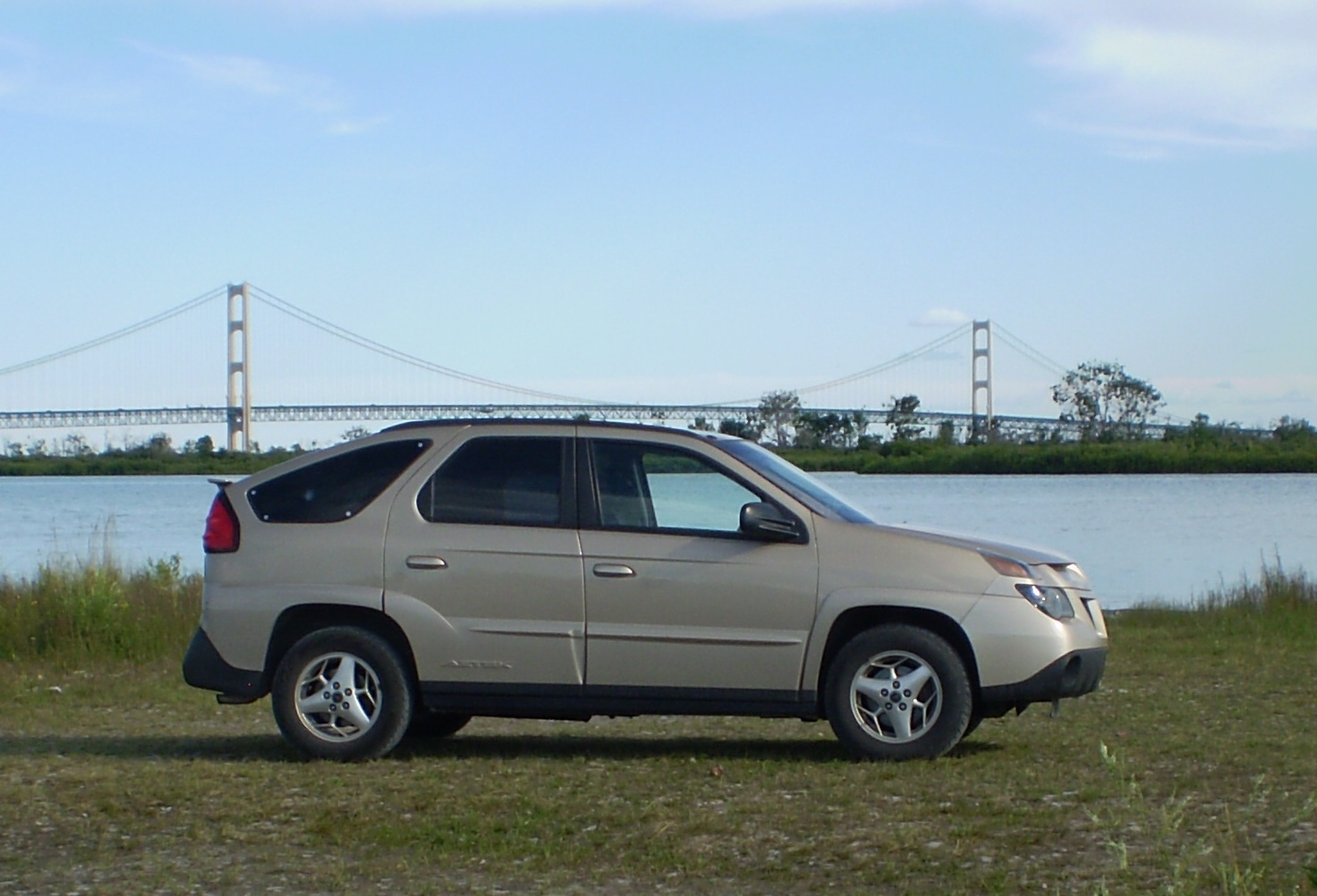
Side view

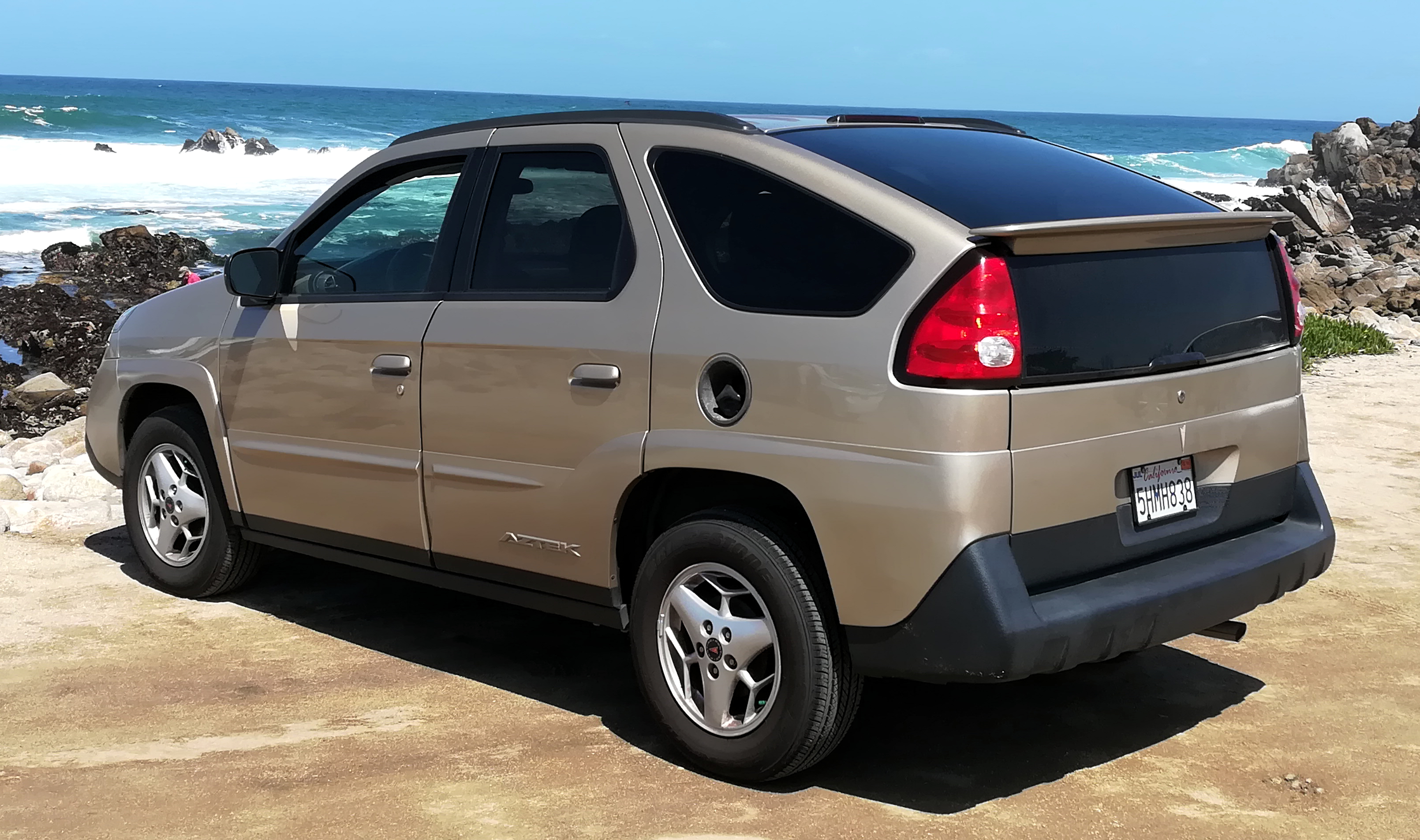
Rear quarter view

The Aztek was styled under the direction of Tom Peters, who would later design the Chevrolet Corvette (C7). According to an analysis in 2000, BusinessWeek said the Aztek was to signal a design renaissance for GM, and to "make a statement about breaking from GM's instinct for caution." One designer said that during the design process, the Aztek was made "aggressive for the sake of being aggressive." Peters, the chief designer said "we wanted to do a bold, in-your-face vehicle that wasn't for everybody." The 2000 Business Week study said the Aztek was "the first awkward step toward innovation by a company that has avoided that path," likening "the debacle to Ford's remodeling of its 1996 Taurus sedan."

The Aztek was noted for its controversial styling. Pulitzer Prize–winning automotive journalist Dan Neil, in naming it one of the 50 worst cars of all time, said the Aztek "violate[d] one of the principal rules of car design: we like cars that look like us. With its multiple eyes and supernumerary nostrils, the Aztek looks deformed and scary, something that dogs bark at and cathedrals employ to ring bells. The shame is, under all that ugliness, there was a useful, competent crossover." Mickey Kaus described the Aztek as having "awkwardly empty and square front wheel wells" and a "gratuitous, fierce animalistic snout, which may have been what prompted incoming GM executive Bob Lutz to famously say that many of the company's products looked like 'angry kitchen appliances.'" James Hall, vice-president at AutoPacific Inc, ranked the Aztek as one of the 10 ugliest cars of all time, while Karl Brauer, CEO and editor-in-chief of TotalCarScore.com, said the Aztek featured "atrocious proportions wrapped in plastic body cladding," and "looked like a station wagon stretched out by a car bomb." A poll in The Daily Telegraph in August 2008 placed the Aztek at number one of the "100 ugliest cars" of all time. An article by Edmunds.com placed the car first of the "100 Worst Cars of All Time" not only because of its styling but also because it "destroyed an 84-year-old automaker."

== Technology and notable features ==
The Aztek was produced at General Motors' Ramos Arizpe, Mexico assembly plant, where it shared an assembly line with the Buick Rendezvous. In Canada, it filled the gap left since the Sunrunner's discontinuation in 1997, while in the U.S. and Mexico, it was the first Pontiac-badged SUV ever sold. At launch, the Aztek was initially available with front-wheel drive, but later in the 2001 model year, a full-time, fully automatic all-wheel-drive system dubbed Versatrak was made available. The all-wheel-drive system provided traction in the snow or rain and could handle moderately rough off-road surfaces, thanks to its hydraulic gerotor pumps and multi-plate clutch packs, instead of the typically used viscous couplings. Versatrak models were equipped with a fully independent rear suspension with aluminum alloy control arms and crossmember, as well as rear solid disc brakes, instead of the rear beam axle and drum brakes on front-wheel-drive models. The Versatrak system was supplied by Steyr-Daimler-Puch AG, under license from McLaren Traction Technologies.

The Aztek was one of the first automobiles to be designed entirely using computerized rapid-prototyping/rapid-visualization tools. The dashboard was designed by Johnson Controls, and featured Pontiac's trademark red lighting scheme along with an optional head-up display.

The Aztek was able to carry within its interior a standard 4-by-8-foot (1.2 m × 2.4 m) sheet of plywood and was available with two rear cargo area options: a pull-out cargo tray that held up to 400 pounds (180 kg) that rolled on built-in wheels when removed from the vehicle, or a versatile cargo net system that held up to 200 pounds (91 kg) and could be configured (a claimed) 22 different ways. Options included a center console that doubled as a removable cooler and a tent/inflatable mattress package that, along with a built-in air compressor, allowed the Aztek to double as a camper. Extending this image was a seat-back mounted backpack, and a number of specialty racks for bicycles, canoes, snowboards, and other such items. An optional 10-speaker Pioneer stereo system provided a set of controls located at the rear of the vehicle for tailgate parties as well as an unusual two-piece tailgate with built-in cup-holders and contoured seating area for added comfort.

== Safety ==
The Insurance Institute for Highway Safety (IIHS) gave the Aztek a Marginal overall score in the frontal offset test. However, it did not conduct a side-impact test.

2004 National Highway Traffic Safety Administration (NHTSA) Crash Test Ratings:

- Frontal Driver:
- Frontal Passenger:
- Side Driver:
- Side Rear Passenger:

== Sales ==
Calendar year	U.S.	Mexico
2000	11,201	
2001	27,322	
2002	27,793	
2003	27,354	
2004	20,588	
2005	5,020	90
2006	347	
2007	69	

== Reception ==
GM forecast sales of up to 75,000 Azteks per year and needed to produce 30,000 annually to break even. Just 27,793 were sold in 2002, which was the model's best-selling year.

Pricing of the Aztek was also an issue at launch: the vehicle was too expensive for its intended Generation X audience and was priced significantly higher than competing vehicles. After the 2001 model year, the GT model was dropped and pricing was slashed, in addition to extremely generous rebates and cut-rate financing instituted by GM in the wake of the terrorist attacks on September 11, 2001.

The Aztek had among the highest CSI (Customer Satisfaction Index) scores in its class, and won the appellation of Most Appealing Entry Sport Utility Vehicle in 2001 from J.D. Power and Associates, an independent consumer survey organization which noted: "The Aztek scores highest or second highest in every APEAL component measure except exterior styling."

Matthew DeBord of The Big Money argued that despite its poor reviews and sales, the Aztek was the car that, in the long run, could save GM. He praised GM for being daring and trying to create an entirely new market in vehicles, rather than simply copying successful formulas. He argued that the Aztek's failure is similar to the failure of Apple's Newton and Macintosh Portable, both of which revolutionized the computer industry and became the basis for later successful products made by Apple.

The car was featured through a tie-in in the sci-fi show Dark Angel in 2000–02. Walter White, the main protagonist of crime drama Breaking Bad, drives an Aztek in the series. Jalopnik called it "one of the perfect examples of car casting in TV" and noted that the show had Walter's Aztek repainted in a unique "gray-beige-green tone" to match the character's original job as a mild-mannered high school chemistry teacher. In 2015, Edmunds ranked the Aztek sixth among U.S. used car buyers aged 18 to 34, crediting the "Breaking Bad Effect" for making the car cool.

The Aztek's "Design by Committee" was criticized in Steve McConnell's software design book, Code Complete 2.

== Year to year changes ==
=== 2001 ===
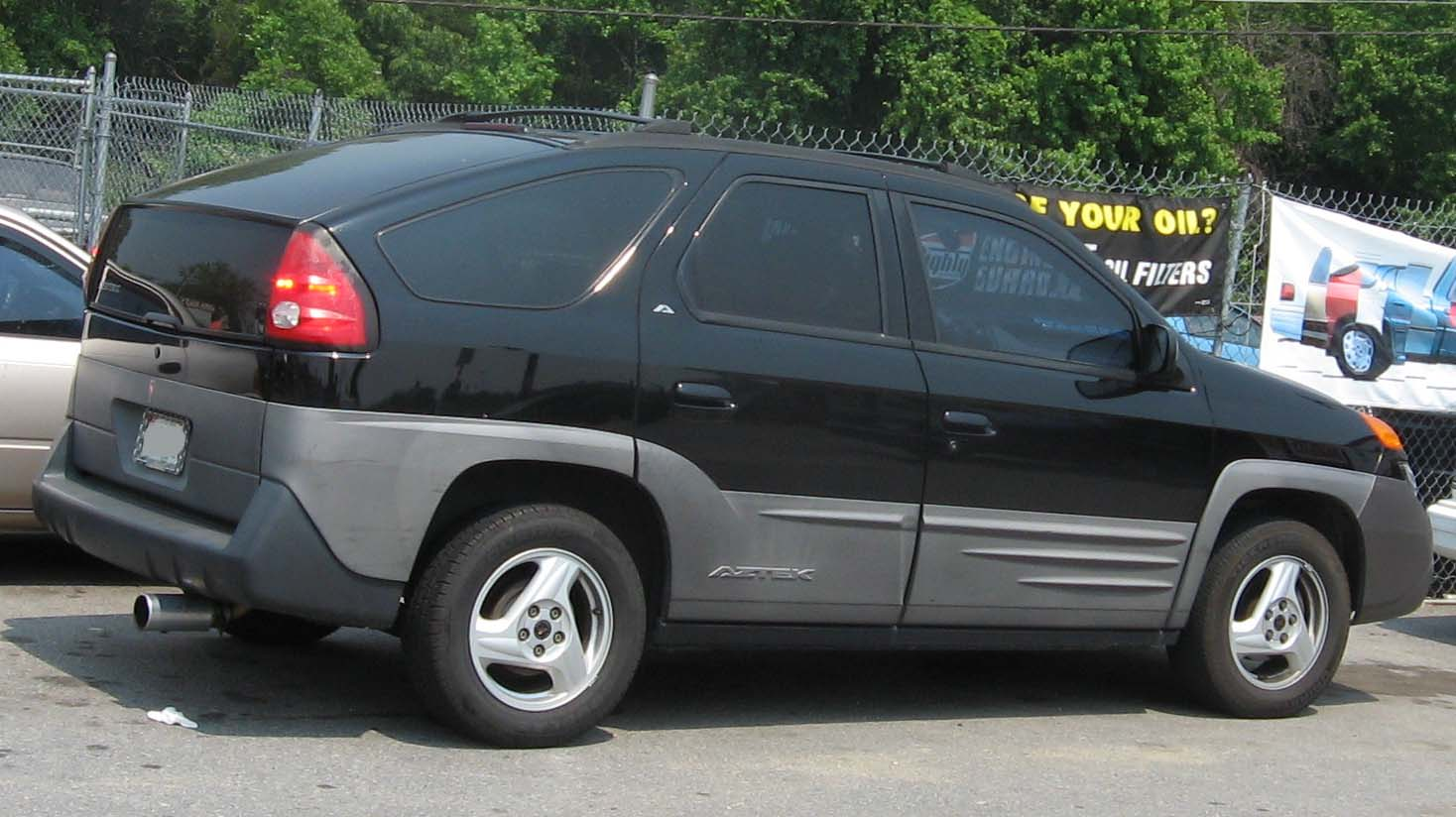
2001 Pontiac Aztek

- All-new model available in base and GT trims both in front-wheel drive and all-wheel drive, the latter boasting an independent rear suspension.
- In February 2001, a red Aztek served as the pace car for the Daytona 500.

=== 2002 ===
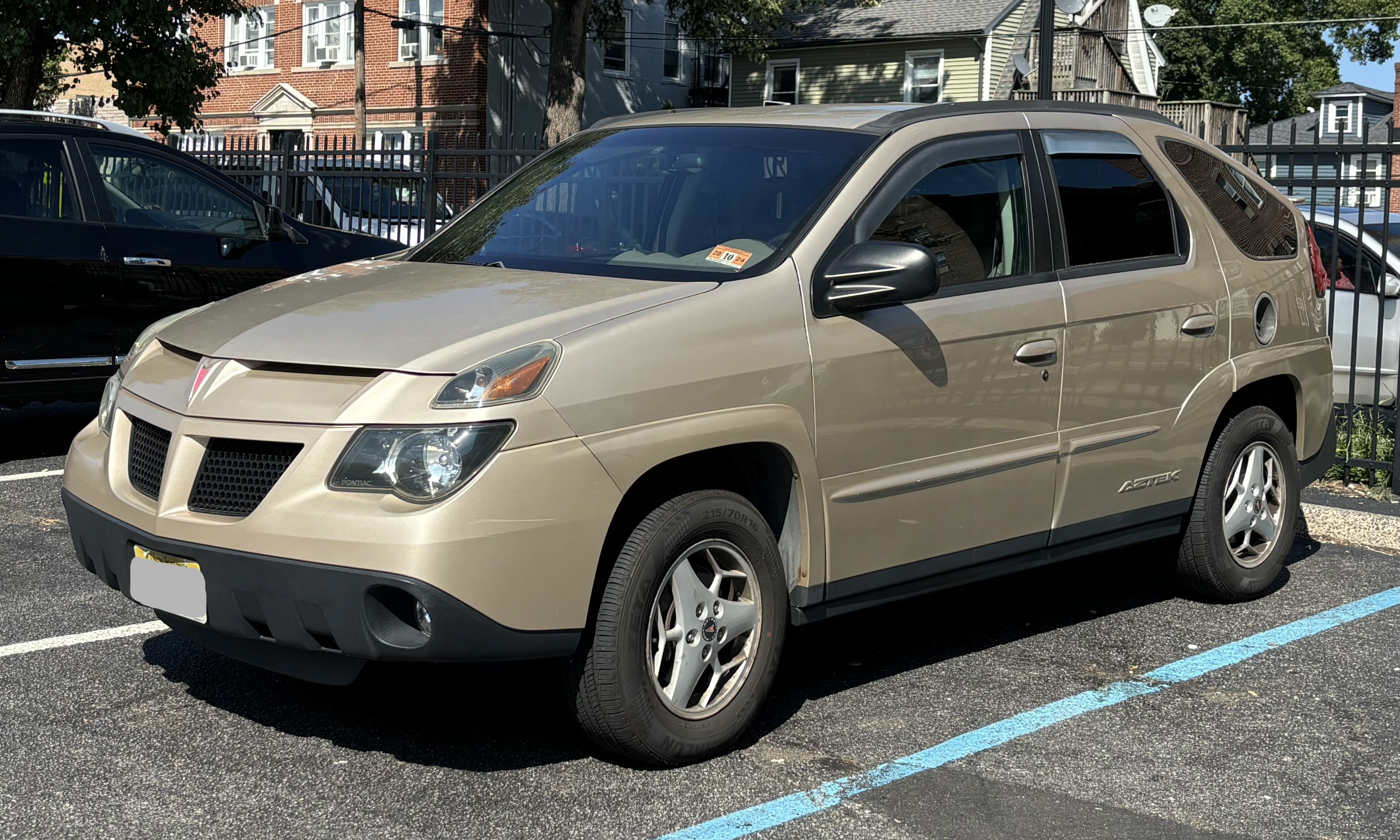
2002–2005 Pontiac Aztek

- Cladding smoothed and changed to body-colored, front marker light/indicators changed from amber to clear, spoiler added to rear glass gate.
- GT model discontinued.

=== 2003 ===
- Aztek "Rally Edition" introduced, which was an option package which featured a lowered front suspension, a larger rear spoiler, body-colored grille, and 17-inch chrome wheels. Though some regarded it as a model of its own, it would become GM's first use of the Rally name since the discontinuation of the GMC Rally passenger van.
- DVD entertainment system, XM satellite radio, and a tire-pressure monitoring system added to the options list.

=== 2004 ===
- A CD/MP3 player became an available option.
- A Limited Edition model was available, with standard leather-trimmed seats, a higher-grade stereo system, a rear spoiler, aluminum interior trim, standard head-up display, and an adjustable six-way driver's seat.

=== 2005 ===
- In its final model year, the Aztek gained hands-free operation of its OnStar system. Exterior color offerings were also changed.
- The Aztek was discontinued after the 2005 model year, and was replaced by the Theta-platform Pontiac Torrent. The Aztek's production line in Ramos Arizpe, Mexico, was retooled for production of the Chevrolet HHR, although Buick Rendezvous production continued for another two years. The last Pontiac Aztek rolled off the assembly line in December 2004.
