= Pontiac Torrent =

American mid-size crossover SUV

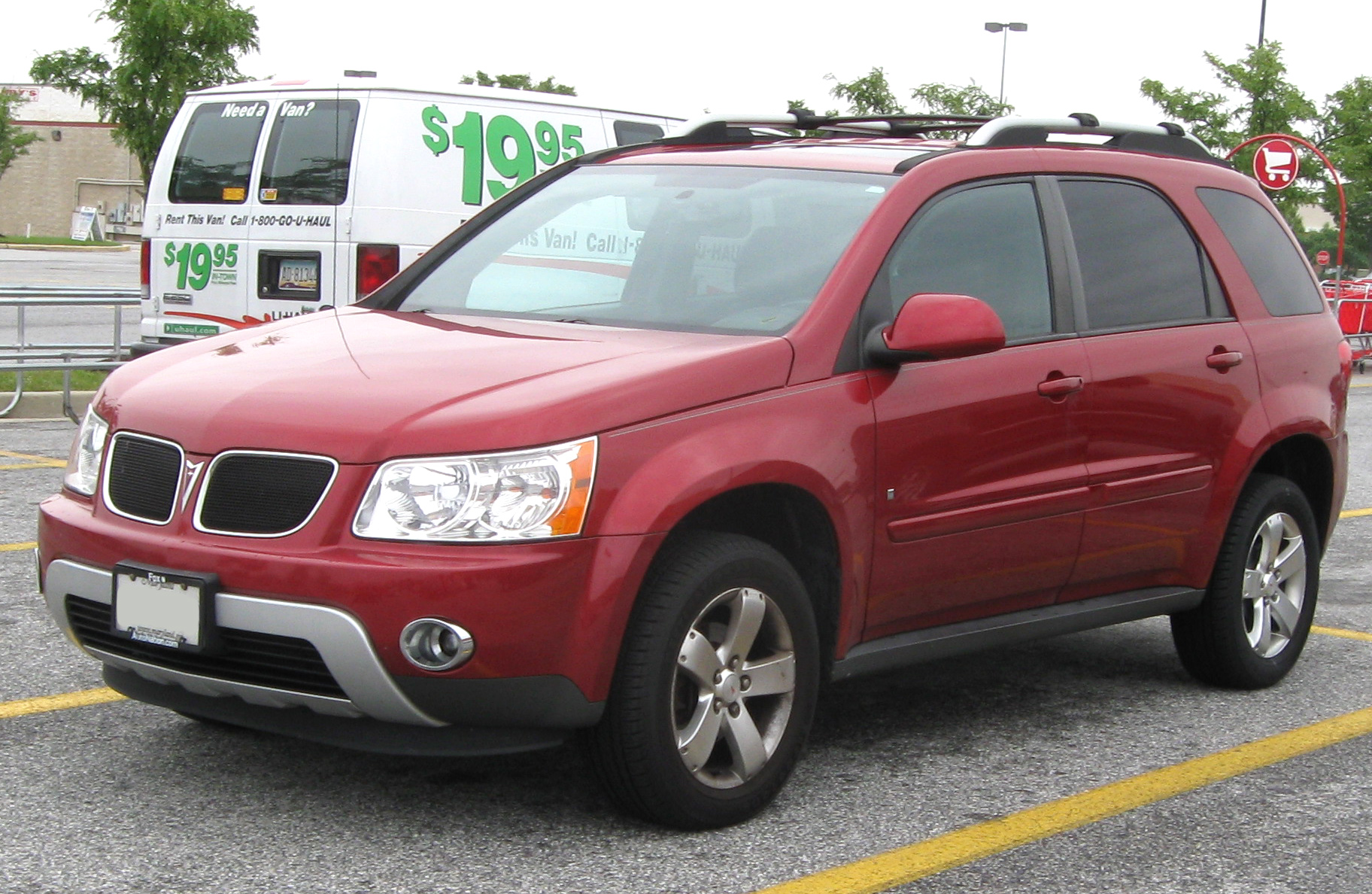

Overview
- Manufacturer: General Motors
- Also called: Chevrolet Equinox
- Production: 2005 – September 2009
- Model years: 2006–2009
- Assembly: Canada: Ingersoll, Ontario (CAMI Automotive)

Body and chassis
- Class: Mid-size crossover SUV
- Body style: 5-door SUV
- Layout: Transverse front-engine, front-wheel drive / all-wheel drive
- Platform: GM Theta platform/GMT192
- Related: Saturn Vue; Opel Antara; Suzuki XL-7

Powertrain
- Engine: 3.4 L (204 CID) LNJ V6; 3.6 L (217 CID) LY7 V6
- Transmission: Aisin AF33 5-speed automatic GM 6T70 6-speed automatic

Dimensions
- Wheelbase: 112.5 in (2,858 mm)
- Length: 188.8 in (4,796 mm)
- Width: 71.4 in (1,814 mm)
- Height: 69.3 in (1,760 mm)

Chronology
- Predecessor: Pontiac Aztek
- Successor: GMC Terrain; Buick Envision

The Pontiac Torrent is a mid-size crossover SUV produced by General Motors for the 2006 to 2009 model years. A replacement for the Aztek, it was a mildly restyled version of the first-generation Chevrolet Equinox. The Torrent shared its basic body structure and mechanicals with the Equinox. However, the Torrent had a different front and rear end to distinguish it visually from the Equinox. The suspension was also modified to be firmer and sportier, and the electronic power steering was recalibrated to deliver a firmer, less artificial feel.

== Design ==
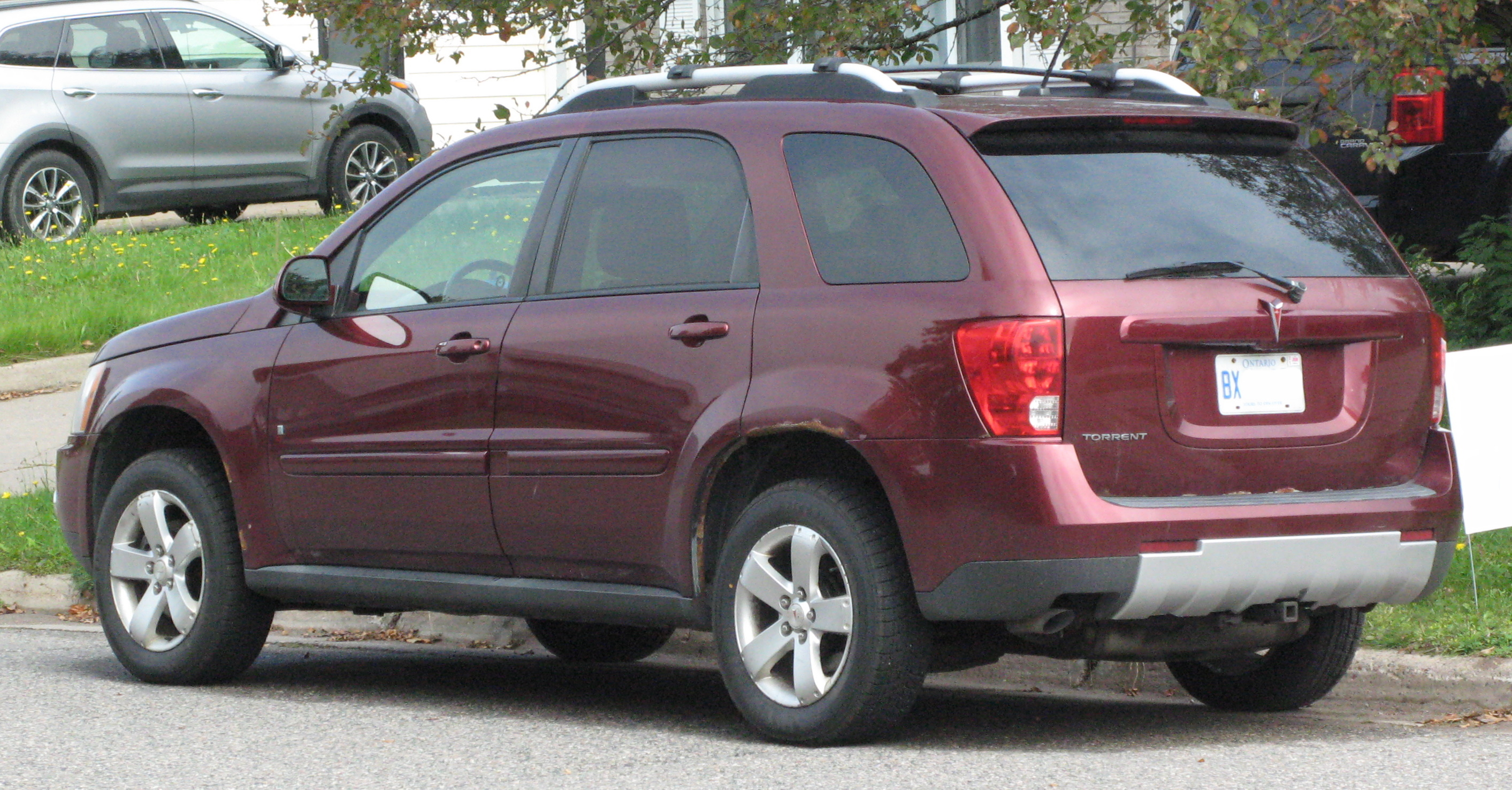
Rear view

The Torrent shared the Equinox's 185 hp (138 kW; 188 PS) 3.4 L V6 with the 5-speed Aisin AF33 automatic transmission.

Like other Pontiac models in the lineup, trim levels of the Torrent were entry-level Base, mid-level GT, and performance-oriented GXP. The GXP featured a more powerful 3.6-liter DOHC SFI V6 engine and a six-speed automatic transmission, along with a unique body kit and other exterior styling cues.

== GXP ==
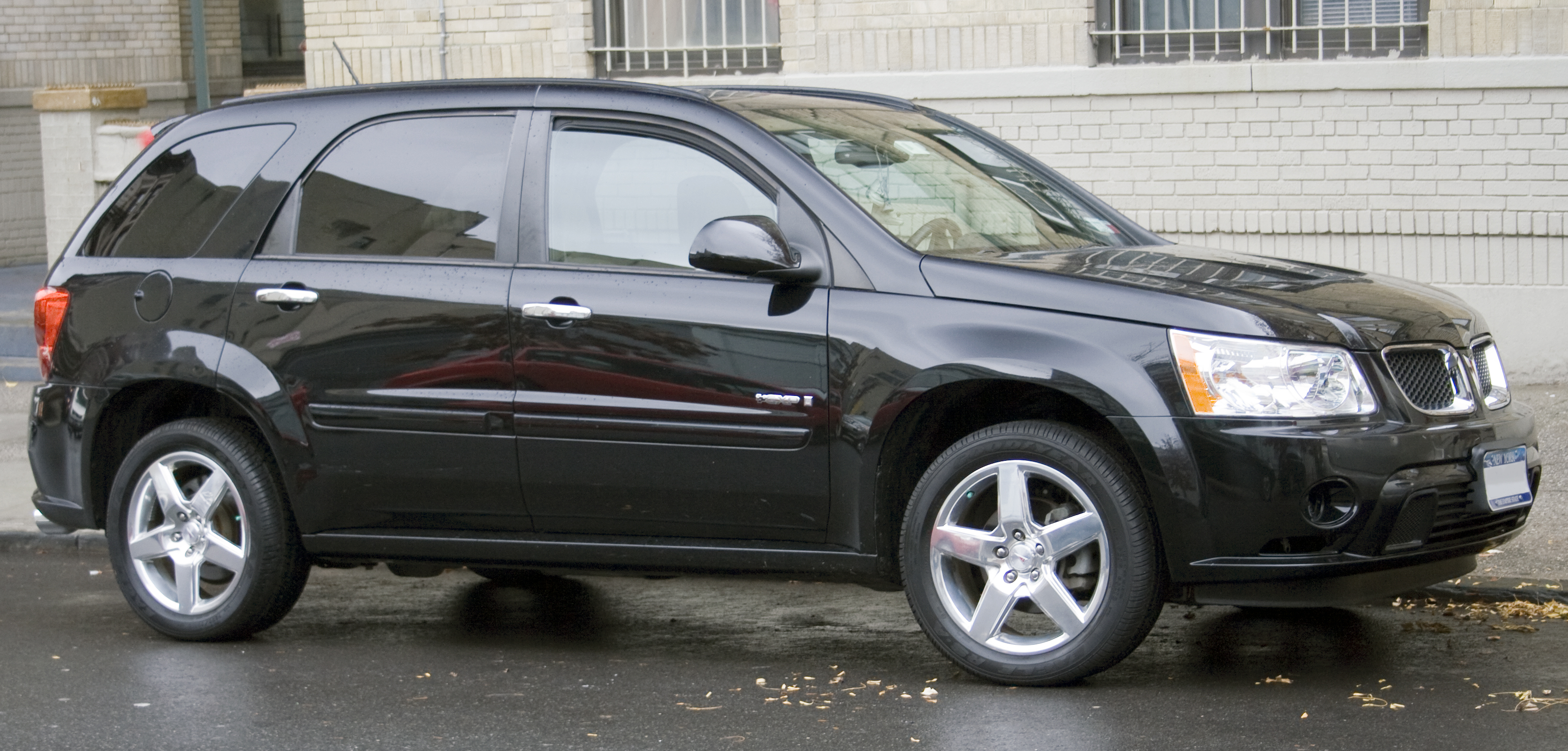
2008 Pontiac Torrent GXP

The GXP trim came with a 6-speed GM 6T70 automatic transmission, which featured manual tap up/down shifting capability. The transmission was paired to a 3.6 L DOHC SFI V6 engine, with 264 hp (197 kW; 268 PS), and a reported 0-60 mph time of 6.9 seconds. Other features included: 18 inch 5-spoke chrome wheels, twin hood scoops, and a unique front and rear body kit. The Torrent GXP is 188.80 inches (4,796 mm) long overall, 71.40 inches (1,814 mm) wide, and 68.30 inches (1,735 mm) tall. When compared to other trims, the Torrent GXP sits 1 inch (25 mm) lower to the ground, and has 6.6 inches (170 mm) of ground clearance. The lower stance is accented by the 18 inch wheels and the absent roof rack, giving the GXP a smoother design flow compared to the standard Torrent. The GXP model also features a performance-tuned suspension, hydraulic power-assisted steering (as opposed to the electric power-assisted steering found in the standard Torrent), improved interior trim (featuring piano black and chrome trim on the console and dash gauges), dual chrome-tipped exhaust, and GXP-specific gauges and console trim. A navigation system was an option, along with heated sport leather seats, a DVD entertainment system, and sunroof. The GXP went on sale in the fall of 2007 as a 2008 model.

General Motors advertised the Torrent GXP in TV commercials which claimed that the Torrent GXP had more of a horsepower advantage than the BMW X3, in an effort to position Pontiac as low-cost rival to BMW.

== Podium Edition ==
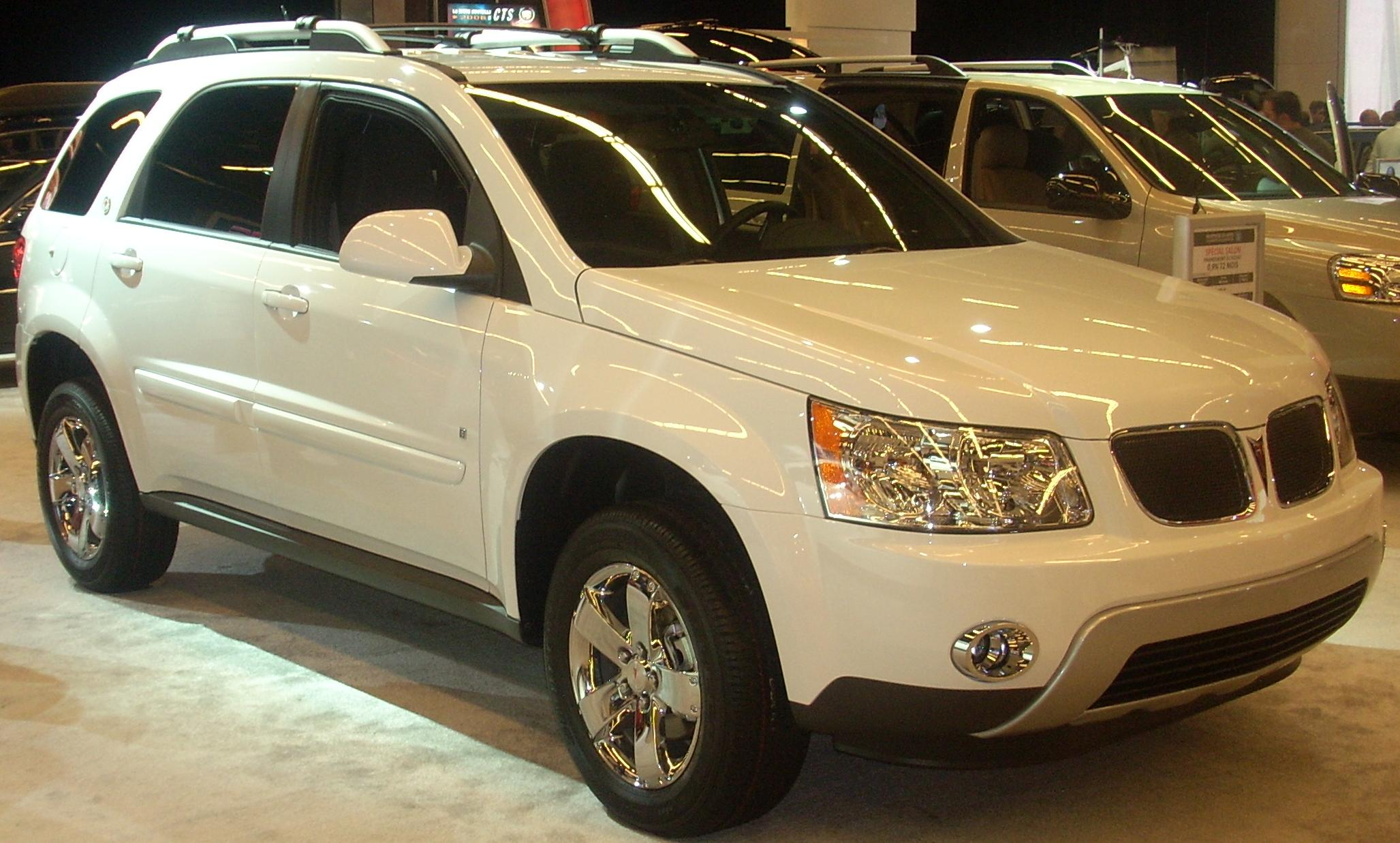
Pontiac Torrent Podium Edition

For the 2008 model year, the Torrent received the Podium Edition trim to coincide with the Vancouver 2010 Winter Olympic Games. The Podium Edition was exclusive to the Canadian market.

== Discontinuation ==
The Pontiac Torrent was discontinued after the 2009 model year. The last Torrent was manufactured on September 2, 2009 as a result of General Motors discontinuing the Pontiac Motor Division in 2010. Originally, a new Buick SUV built on the GM Theta platform was going to be introduced in 2010 to serve as a replacement for the Torrent, but General Motors decided to replace the Torrent with a new GMC SUV built on the GM Theta platform called the GMC Terrain, which went on sale in 2009 for the 2010 model year.

== Engines ==
Years	Engine	Power	Torque
2006–2009	3.4 L LNJ V6	185 hp (138 kW)	210 lb·ft (285 N·m)
2008–2009	3.6 L LY7 V6	264 hp (197 kW)	250 lb·ft (339 N·m)

== Sales ==
Calendar year	United States	Mexico
2005	10,303	276
2006	43,174	1,768
2007	32,644	1,969
2008	20,625	1,340
2009	9,638	491
Total	116,375	5,844
