= Jelani Aliyu =

Nigerian automotive designer

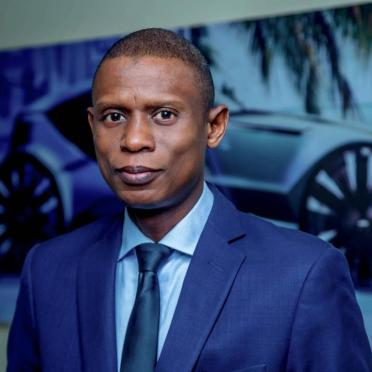
- Born: September 8, 1966 (age 59); Kaduna, Nigeria
- Occupation: Automobile designer
- Years active: 1996 - present
- Known for: GM lead of Exterior Design
- Notable work: Pontiac G6, Chevrolet Volt
- Office: Former DG National Automotive Design and Development Council, Nigeria.

Jelani Aliyu (born September 8, 1966) is a Nigerian automotive designer who worked for the American car company General Motors. He was a senior creative designer at GM until his appointment as the director general of the National Automotive Design and Development Council (NADDC) in 2017 by the former Nigerian president Muhammadu Buhari.

== Early life and education ==
Aliyu was born in 1966 in Kaduna, Nigeria into the family of Alhaji Aliyu Haidar and Hajiya Sharifiyya Hauwa Aliyu, and was the fifth of the seven children in the family who originated from Dogon-daji in Sokoto State. This fact was why young Aliyu was moved to Sokoto for his education. He studied at the Sokoto Capital School from 1971 to 1978 and then Federal Government College Sokoto where he received an outstanding award of the best graduating student in Technical Drawing.

In 1986, Aliyu gained admission to study Architecture at the Ahmadu Bello University Zaria. However, Aliyu quickly dropped out from the university when he found out that studying at the university would unlikely give him the opportunity to pursue his dream of becoming a car designer as studying there is not as practical as in the polytechnic and then went on to the Federal Polytechnic Birnin Kebbi in Kebbi State from 1986 to 1988 where he earned an associate degree in Architecture with an award for the Best All-Round Student. While he was there he began seeking admission into design schools in Europe and the U.S. that would lead him to a career in automotive design.

In 1990, Aliyu was sponsored by the Sokoto State Scholarship board to study in the United States at the College for Creative Studies in Detroit to study automotive design. While studying Aliyu won two prestigious awards from Ford Motor Company and Michelin, US. In 1994, Aliyu got his qualification in automotive design and immediately joined General Motors team, where he started his design career.

== Career ==
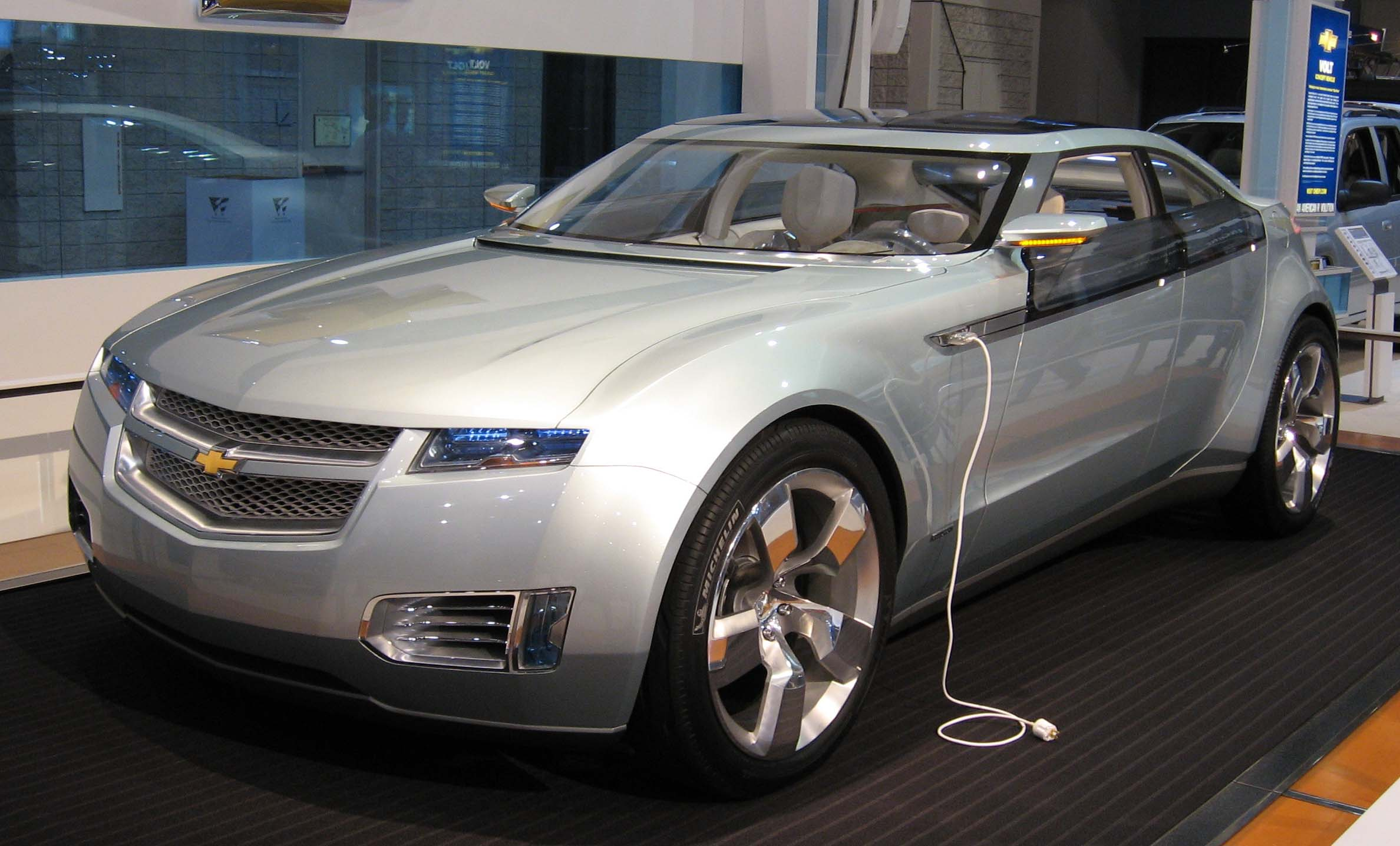
Chevrolet Volt concept photographed at the Washington Auto Show.

In 1994, after graduating from the College for Creative Studies, Aliyu joined General Motors. At General Motors Aliyu was the co-designer of the Oldsmobile Bravada, Buick Rendezvous and the Opel Astra and was the lead exterior designer for the Pontiac G6 and the Chevrolet Volt, a hybrid electric vehicle with a sleek arcing roofline.

When speaking about the inspiration for his automotive design career in an interview, Jelani said;

I have always loved drawing. These are different things around me, people, objects, plants, also stuff from my imagination. Growing up, I have always loved science fiction, and in the movies, you would see a lot of alien spacecraft and other futuristic things that would inspire me to look beyond. I also love cars very much, even though then we did not have any Ferraris in Sokoto. However, we did have magazines in which I saw them, and they inspired me, too. So I put together my love for drawing and cars and decided to be a car designer.

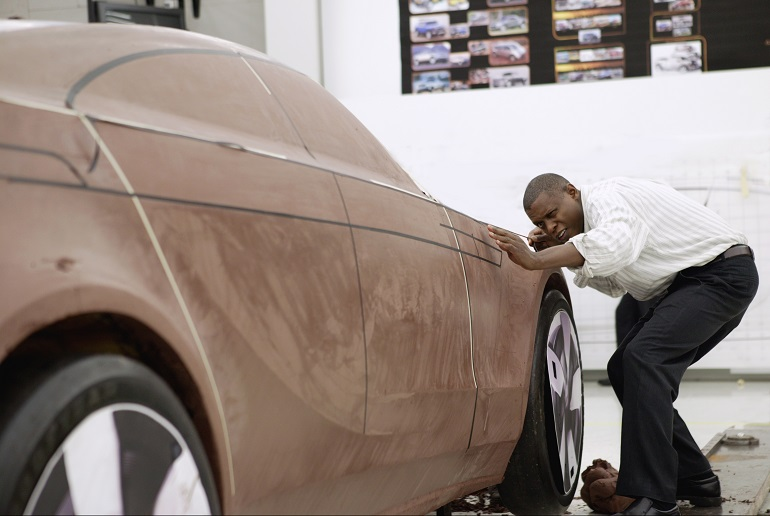
Jelani Aliyu pictured working on the Chevy volt concept prototype.

He also said, his inspirations were his parents because they let him decide what he wanted to do. For example, when he went to Ahmadu Bello University in Zaria and decided he did not want to continue there, they were supportive. They did not insist that he had to remain there.

On the design of Chevrolet Volt, he said;

Look at a tiny leaf, it is only a millimeter thick and yet it is a highly efficient factory,.. I try to understand nature's efficiency and design and I pulled those concepts and applied them to the Chevrolet Volt.

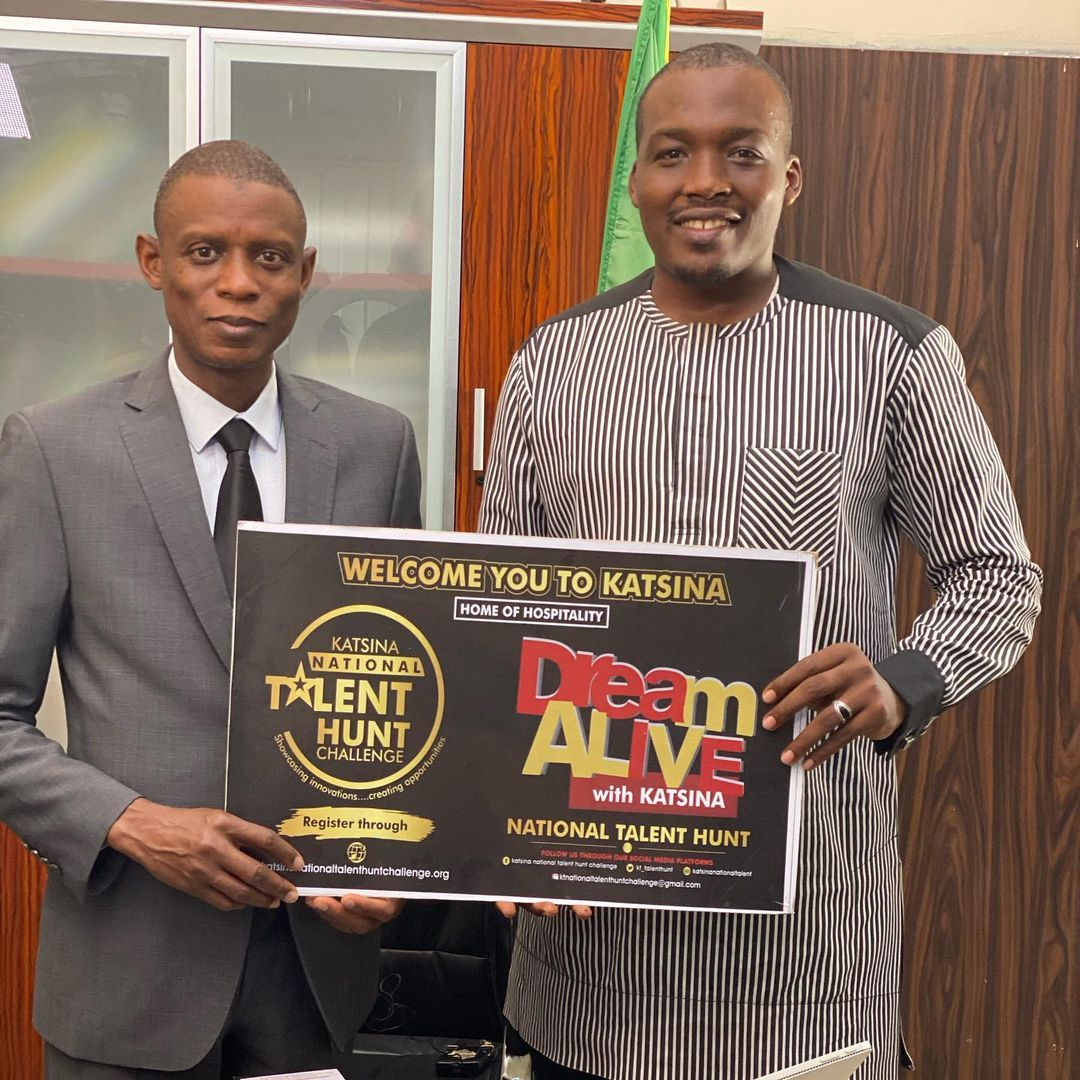
Jelani aliyu at the 2021 Katsina talent hunt launch event.

== Notable designs ==
- 2004 Pontiac G6
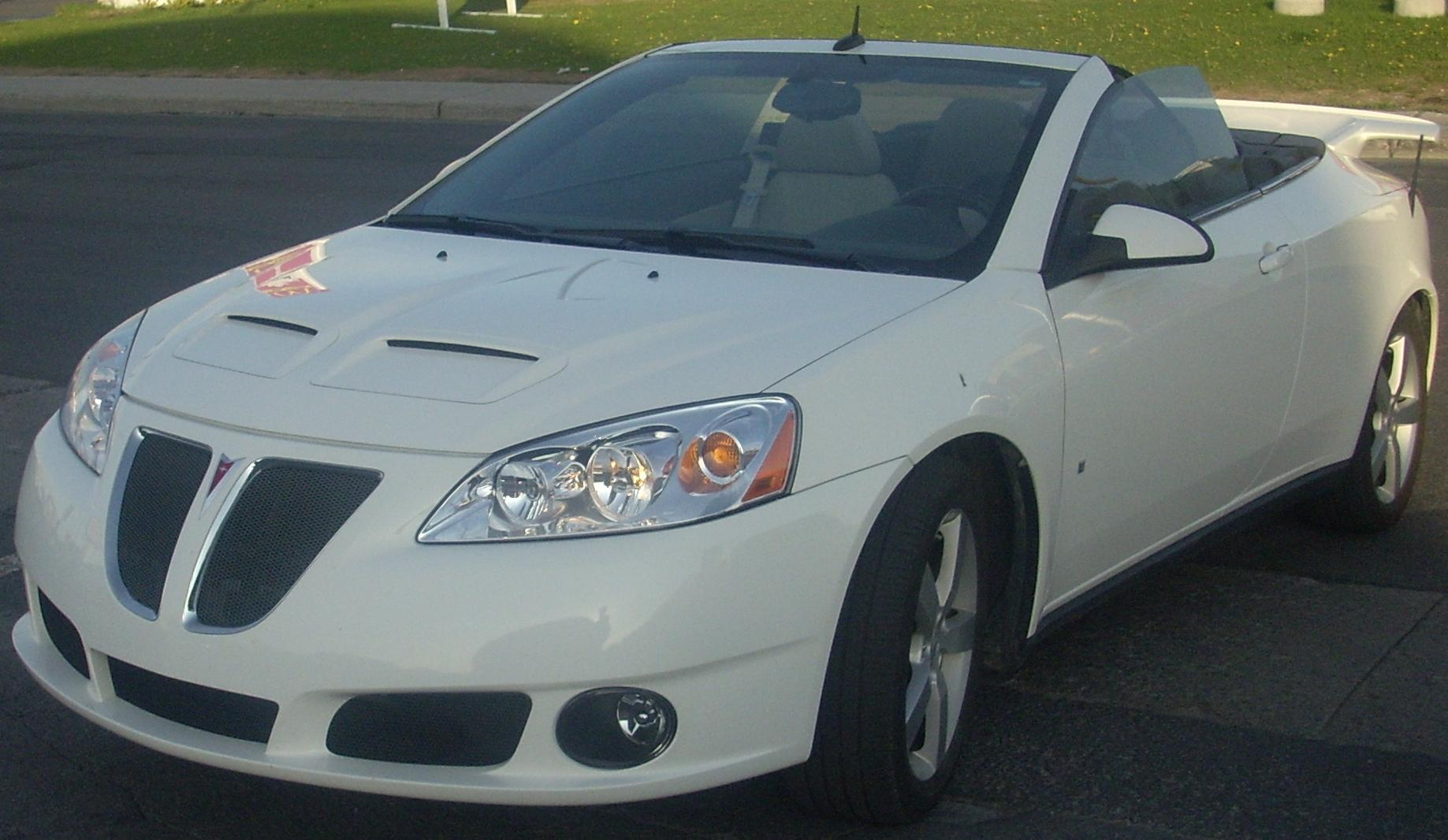
  Pontiac G6 GT Street Edition Convertible (Orange Julep)
- 2010 Chevrolet Volt

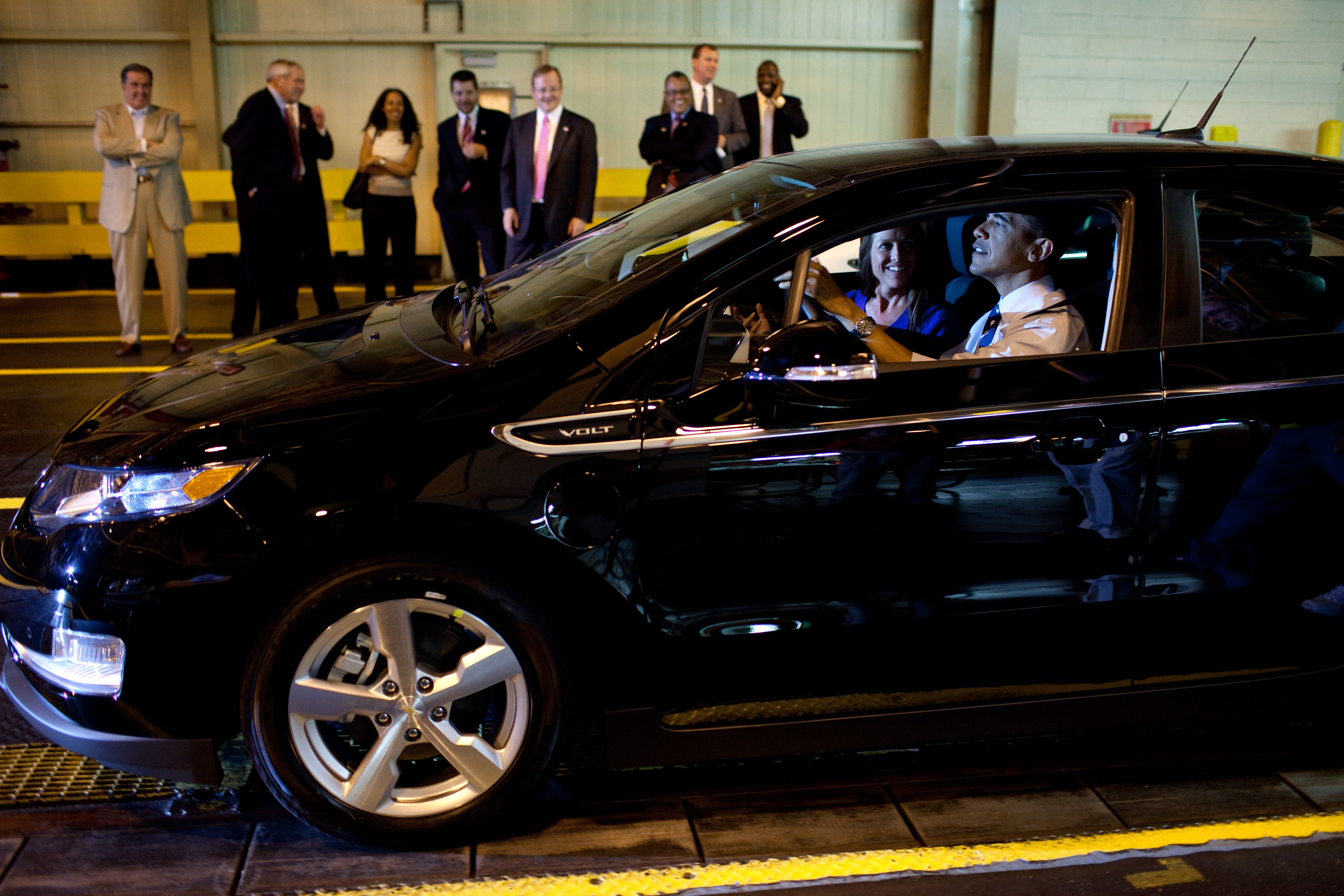
President Barack Obama behind the wheel of a new Chevy Volt during his tour of the General Motors Auto Plant in Hamtramck, Michigan

== See also ==
- Chuck Jordan (automobile designer)
- Strother McMinn
- Helene Rother
