= Buick Rendezvous =

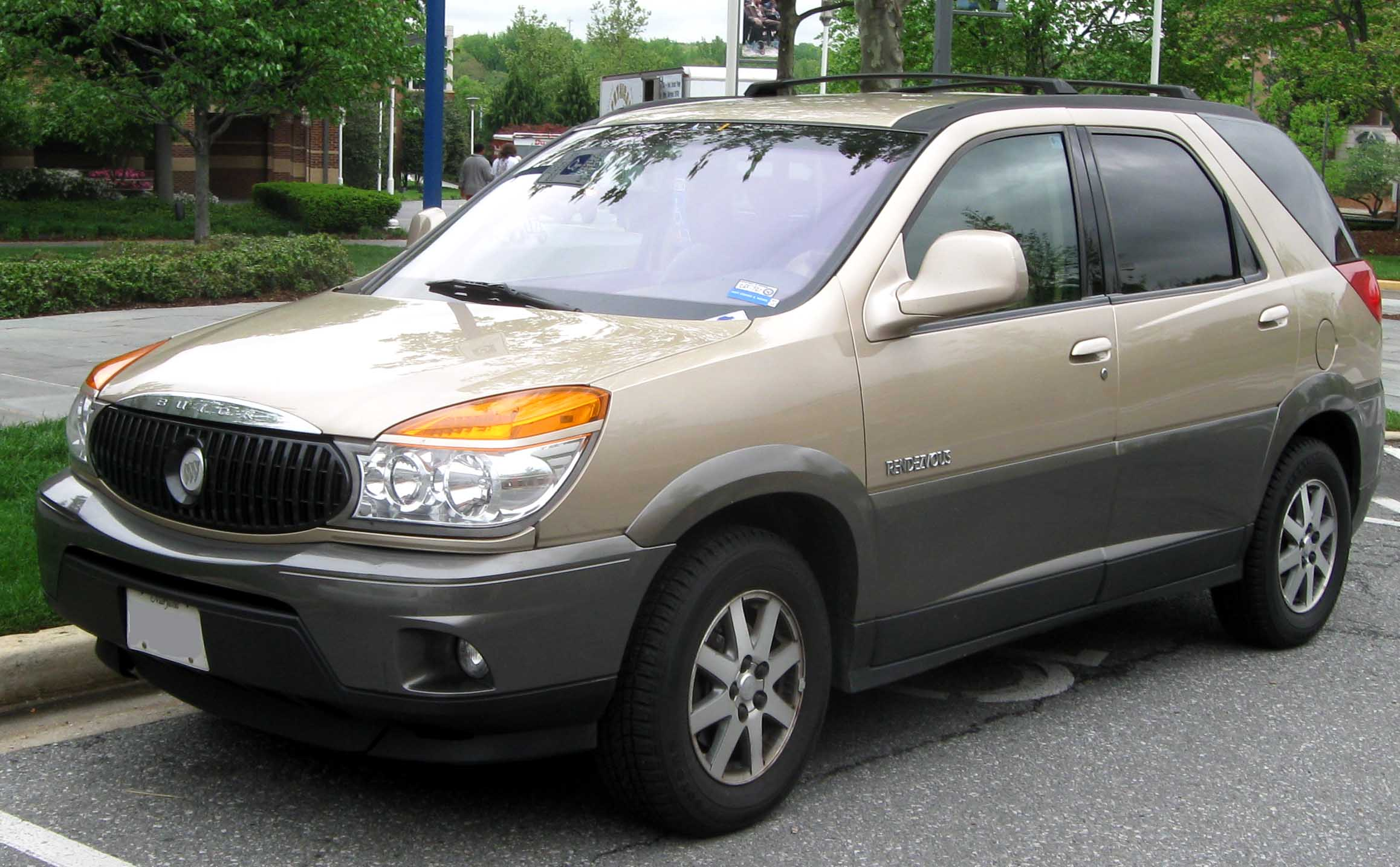

Overview
- Manufacturer: Buick (General Motors)
- Production: February 2001 – December 2006
- Model years: 2002–2007
- Assembly: Ramos Arizpe, Mexico
- Designer: Jelani Aliyu; Elizabeth Wetzel (Interior) (1999)

Body and chassis
- Class: Mid-size crossover SUV
- Body style: 4-door CUV
- Layout: Front-engine, front-wheel drive / all-wheel drive
- Platform: U-body/GMT257
- Related: Pontiac Aztek

Powertrain
- Engine: 3.4 L LA1 V6; 3.5 L LX9 V6; 3.6 L LY7 V6
- Transmission: 4-speed automatic GM 4T65-E

Dimensions
- Wheelbase: 112 in (2,845 mm)
- Length: 186.5 in (4,737 mm)
- Width: 73.6 in (1,869 mm)
- Height: 68.9 in (1,750 mm)
- Curb weight: 4,024–4,272 lb (1,825–1,938 kg)

Chronology
- Successor: Buick Enclave

The Buick Rendezvous is a mid-size crossover SUV that was marketed by Buick for the 2002–2007 model years. It debuted at the Chicago Auto Show in February 2000, and sales commenced in spring 2001. The Buick Rendezvous and its corporate cousin, the Pontiac Aztek, were GM's first entries into the crossover SUV segment. The Rendezvous featured a four-speed automatic transmission with a V6 engine and optional all-wheel drive (dubbed Versatrak). The SUV used the same platform as GM's short-wheelbase minivans, the Chevrolet Venture and Pontiac Montana. The Rendezvous provided a passenger- and load-carrying capacity not seen in the Buick lineup since the discontinuation of the Buick Roadmaster Estate station wagon in 1996.

== Technology and notable features ==
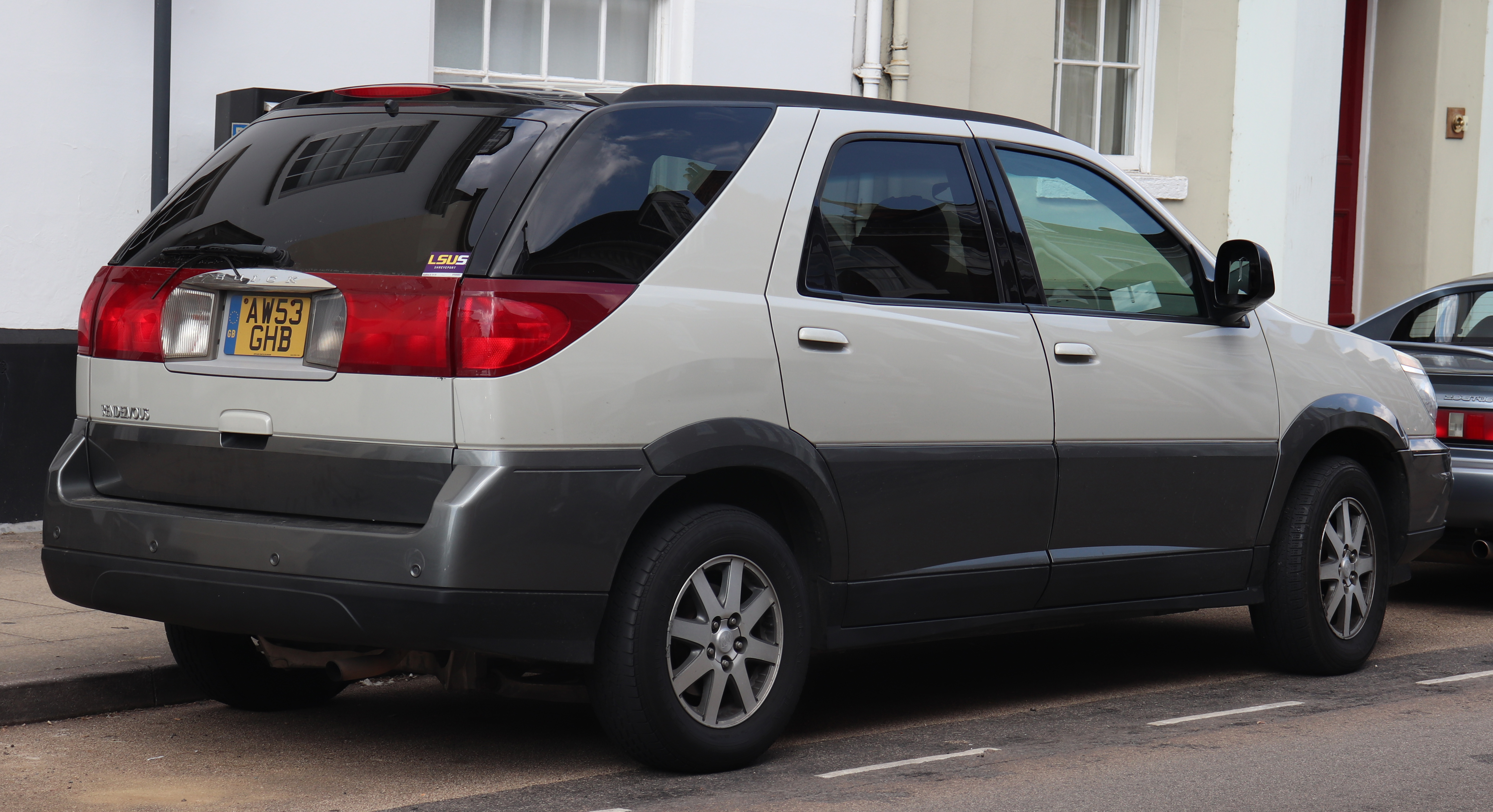
Rear view

It was Buick's first truck-based vehicle in its lineup since 1923, and the Rendezvous was billed as a combination of the best attributes of a minivan (large cargo capacity, seating for up to seven), a luxury automobile (ride, handling, smoothness), and a sport utility vehicle (truck styling and available all-wheel drive).

The Rendezvous was produced at General Motors' Ramos Arizpe, Mexico, assembly plant, where it shared an assembly line with the Pontiac Aztek. However, unlike the Aztek, the Rendezvous rides on the same 112-inch wheelbase as the short-wheelbase variants of GM's second-generation U-platform minivans. In lieu of a traditional four-wheel-drive system, the Rendezvous offered Versatrak, a full-time, fully automatic all-wheel-drive system which provided sure-footed traction in inclement weather and could handle moderate off-road surfaces. The Versatrak system uses hydraulic gerotor pumps and multi-plate clutch packs, instead of the typically used viscous couplings, and is supplied by Steyr-Daimler-Puch AG, under license from McLaren Traction Technologies.

Buick benchmarked its Park Avenue sedan as the prototypical target for ride and handling for the Rendezvous. To provide a luxurious and responsive car-like ride, all Rendezvous models came equipped with a fully independent rear suspension system with aluminum-alloy control arms and crossmember, as well as rear solid disc brakes, regardless of drivetrain.

The instrument cluster of the Rendezvous featured teal-illuminated needles and numbers set in a silver face accented by chrome trim rings that was meant to evoke the luxurious look and feel of an expensive watch or designer bracelet. On the uplevel CXL model, a driver information center on the instrument panel provided the outside temperature, compass, and a trip computer that included readings of fuel economy, driving range, and amount of fuel used; this was also available with the base CX model. An optional second-generation head-up display was also available on both CX and CXL models, while an optional tire-pressure monitoring system provided readings of tire pressure and warned if out of the specified range.

The Rendezvous boasted the ability to carry seven passengers when equipped with a third-row bench, a class-leading feature that Buick brought to market before its competitors, and was able to carry a standard 4-by-8-foot (1.2 m × 2.4 m) sheet of plywood.

In support of the Rendezvous's intended role as a versatile accoutrement for busy people with families, it provided a center console with storage space and power points for a laptop computer as well as separate compartments to hold a purse, a cell phone, pager, or other small items that the owner would want to keep organized and readily accessible as well as an optional rear cargo organizer system and rear seat stereo system controls with headsets.

== Safety ==
The Insurance Institute for Highway Safety (IIHS) gives the Rendezvous an overall Acceptable rating in its frontal offset crash test for fair structure performance and fair dummy control. However, the IIHS did not perform a side-impact test on the Rendezvous.

== Year to year changes ==
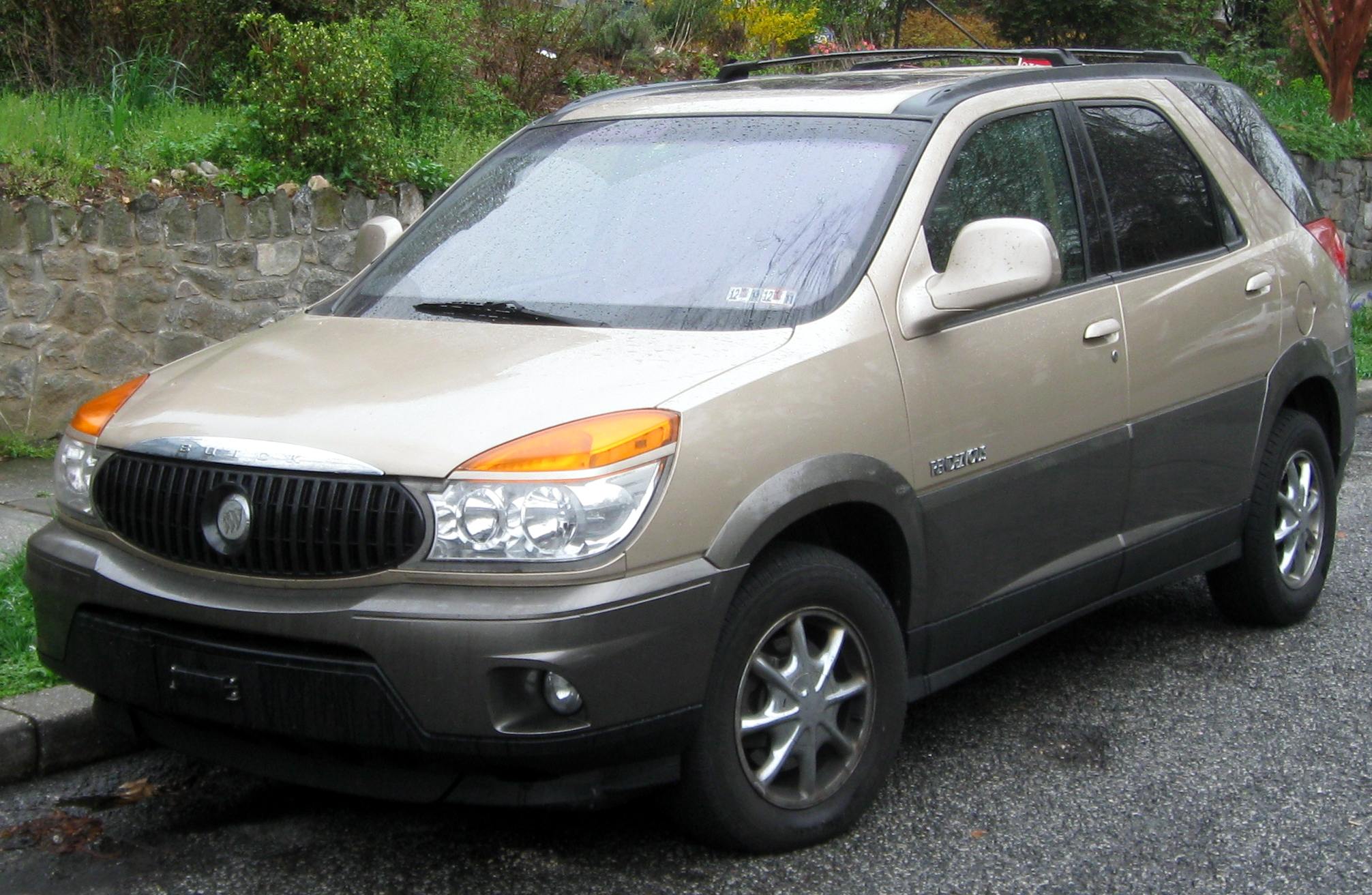
2002–2003 Buick Rendezvous CXL

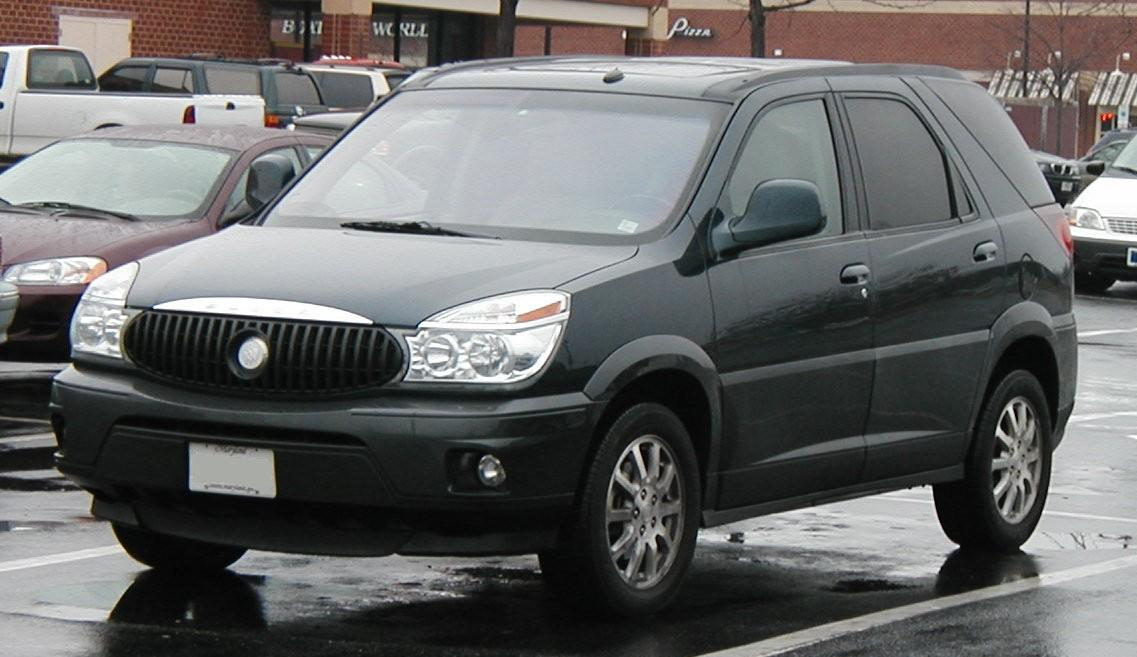
2004–2005 Buick Rendezvous

=== 2002 ===
- Available in CX and CXL trims; front-wheel drive available on CX only.
- Standard five-passenger seating with available seating for six or seven and stowable third-row seat (except on CX AWD).
- Standard equipment on all models includes power windows/locks/mirrors, cruise control, CD player, leather-accented steering wheel with radio controls, four 12-volt power outlets (two on first row, one on second row, one on third row), cloth seats (with manual four-way position and lumbar control for front seats and foldable/removable second-row seats), floor mats, traction control (on FWD models), anti-lock brakes, daytime running lamps and fog lamps, roof rack, remote keyless entry, deep-tinted glass (except front doors and windshield), lockable center console and glovebox, 16 × 6.5-inch wheels (steel on CX FWD, brushed aluminum on AWD), cargo net, and cargo privacy cover.
- Optional on CX and standard on CXL are a garage door opener, rear cargo mat, driver information center (with tire-pressure monitoring system on later models), rear parking sensors, and except on CX AWD, power seats with six-way adjusters, memory seats, second-row footrests, heated memory mirrors, leather seats with heated first row, and rear-seat audio controls. Cloth-and-leather-trimmed seating is exclusive to CX FWD.
- Exclusive to CXL are electronic dual-zone climate control with pollen/odor filter, auto-dimming interior rearview mirror, and optional chrome-clad aluminum wheels and head-up display.

=== 2003 ===
- Available models now include CX, CX Plus, CXL, and CXL Plus in both FWD and AWD.
- An overhead DVD entertainment system with LCD screen and two pairs of wireless headphones is optional on CXL, but is not available with the sunroof.
- Traction control, ABS, and side-mounted airbags are now optional on FWD CX models.
- Five-passenger seating is standard on all models except on CXL Plus, where seven-passenger seating is standard. Six-passenger seating is optional on CXL.
- A cargo net is now optional on all models.
- A trailer hitch/harness is now available in addition to the trailering preparation package; both are available on all models except base CX.
- Cross bars for roof rack are now optional on base CX models.
- Cloth-and-leather-trimmed seating is now available on all CX models; first row now has one 12-volt power outlet.
- A tire-pressure monitoring system is now standard on all CXL models.
- A manual dual-zone HVAC system is now standard on CX Plus, CXL, and FWD CXL Plus models. AWD CXL Plus models feature automatic dual-zone climate control, while base CX models still feature single-zone climate control.
- On later models, the liftgate release button has been relocated from the instrument panel to the liftgate handle.
- XM Satellite Radio is now offered for the contiguous United States.

=== 2004 ===
- Front turn signal/parking lights have been changed to clear from the previously used amber.
- The power window and mirror switches are gray instead of black, and later models have chrome accents on the instrument cluster gauges and control knobs for climate and fog lamps.
- A touch-screen AM/FM radio with a DVD-based navigation system is now available on CXL models.
- Passenger-side door no longer has a keyhole.
- A 3.6-liter aluminum-block DOHC V6 with variable valve timing is now available on AWD CXL models.
- The Ultra is added as a top-line model, with all comfort options, 17 × 6.5-inch aluminum wheels, leather and ultrasuede seating, leather-wrapped steering wheel with faux woodgrain accents and chrome Buick tri-shield, faux woodgrain interior trim with chrome door handles, 3.6-liter V6, and all-wheel drive standard.

=== 2005 ===
- The Ultra is now available in front-wheel drive in addition to all-wheel drive.
- The 3.6-liter V6 is now available on FWD CXL models.
- Seventeen-inch aluminum wheels are now standard on all models except the base CX, which would later receive 17-inch steel wheels.
- A color LCD-based radio with DVD-based navigation system is now available.
- Steering wheel now has a chrome Buick tri-shield, and CXL models now feature faux woodgrain accents on the steering wheel and interior trim.
- The right front passenger seat now features a passenger sensing system.

=== 2006 ===
- CXL Plus replaces Ultra as the top model.
- A suite of sound-deadening features called QuietTuning is now standard on all Buick models, including the Rendezvous. QuietTuning consists of laminated front door glass, revised foam sealing for the outside mirrors and door handles, and denser sound-absorbing material inside the hood, on the firewall, and within the instrument panel.
- OnStar is now standard on CXL models.
- The 3.5-liter V6, which is used in the 2005 U-platform minivans, replaces the 3.4-liter V6.
- Grille now has a chrome Buick tri-shield.
- A black-faced instrument cluster replaces the all-silver one used in prior years (2005 in some models).

=== 2007 ===
- OnStar Direction and Connections with turn-by-turn navigation.
- Available only in front-wheel drive with 3.5-liter V6.
- Cassette player discontinued.
- Last model year for the Buick Rendezvous.

== Sales ==
Calendar year	US Sales
2001	31,754
2002	61,468
2003	72,643
2004	60,039
2005	60,589
2006	45,954
2007	15,295
