= Ramos Arizpe =

City in the Mexican state of Coahuila

- Municipal seat
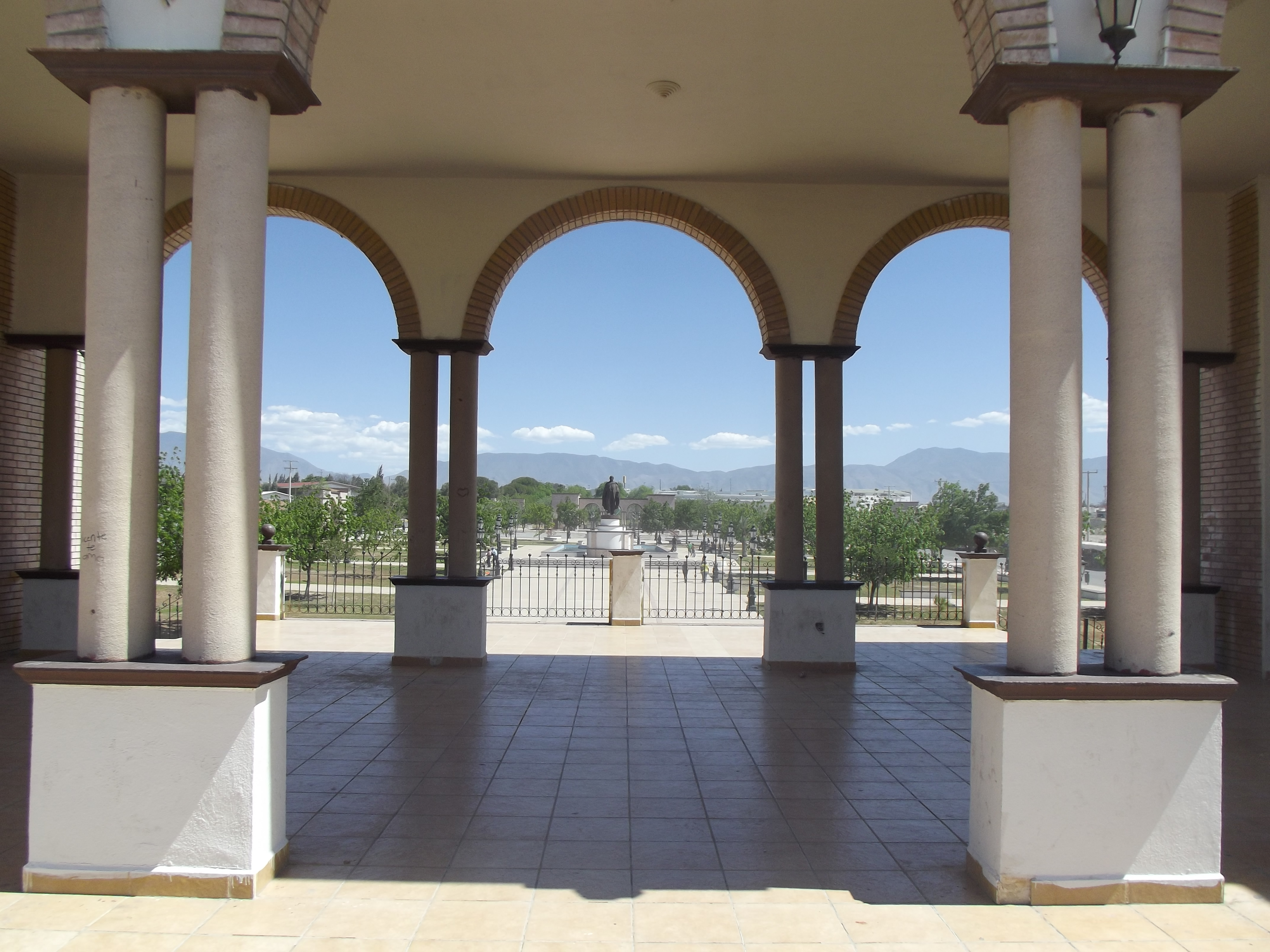
- Alameda

- Location in Mexico Ramos Arizpe (Mexico)
- Coordinates: 25°33′N 100°58′W
- Country: Mexico
- State: Coahuila
- Municipality: Ramos Arizpe
- Founded: 1577
- Founded as: Valle de las Labores
- Named for: Miguel Ramos Arizpe

Area
  - Total: 5,306 km^{2} (2,049 sq mi)

Population (2020)
  - Total: 114,010
- Time zone: UTC-6 (Central)

Ramos Arizpe (Spanish pronunciation: [ˈramos aˈɾispe]) is a town that is part of the Saltillo metropolitan area located in the Mexican state of Coahuila. The city reported a population of 114,010 in the 2020 census; the municipality had a population of 122,243. Its area is 5,306.6 km^{2} (2,048.9 sq mi).

Ramos Arizpe was established originally in 1577 as Valle de las Labores, a name chosen as the soil was conducive to agriculture.

== History ==
In the year 1606 the town was renamed Valle de San Nicolás de la Capellanía, because Spanish missionaries had taken there a sacred image of Saint Nicholas of Tolentino.

It is now a major industrial center, founded in 1974, featuring many automotive industrial parks. Several major companies have large operations in Ramos Arizpe or vicinity, such the General Motors Ramos Arizpe Assembly plant (Home of the Chevy C2, Pontiac Aztek, Buick Rendezvous, Saturn Vue, Cadillac SRX, Saab 9-4X and HHR), Chrysler Saltillo Engine Plant (Home of the 5.7L V8 HEMI engine) and other suppliers such as Magna, Stabilus, ZF Sachs and Macimex. As of 2016 the plant produces about one third of the firm's full-sized pickups.

Plan de Guadalupe International Airport serving Saltillo and Ramos Arizpe (Iata: SLW) is located there.

== Geography ==
=== Climate ===
Ramos Arizpe has a desert climate (Köppen climate classification BWh Owing to its altitude of 1,400 to 1,500 m (4,600 to 4,900 ft) above sea level, temperatures are milder than other desert cities at lower elevations. Winters are mild with warm temperatures during the day and cold nights. The January average temperature is 11.9 °C (53.4 °F). On average, temperatures drop below freezing on 18 days per year, which can occur in the months November to April. Occasionally, it can receive snowfall. Precipitation is low during the winter months and many days are clear and sunny, averaging 20-22 clear days from December to March.

Summers are warm to hot with the warmest month being June and July, each with an average temperature of 23.2 °C (73.8 °F). Temperatures frequently exceed 30 °C (86 °F) and occasionally 40.0 °C (104.0 °F) during the summer months. Most of the precipitation that Ramos Arizpe receives falls during the summer months. On average, Ramoz Arizpe receives 245.6 millimetres (9.7 in) of precipitation per year and there are 37 days with measureable precipitation. The wettest record month was June 1990 with 385 millimetres (15.2 in) and the wettest day record was 28 June 2007 with 166 millimetres (6.5 in).

Climate data for Ramos Arizpe
Month	Jan	Feb	Mar	Apr	May	Jun	Jul	Aug	Sep	Oct	Nov	Dec	Year
Record high °C (°F)	34.0 (93.2)	35.0 (95.0)	37.0 (98.6)	43.0 (109.4)	42.0 (107.6)	42.0 (107.6)	44.0 (111.2)	49.0 (120.2)	42.0 (107.6)	41.0 (105.8)	36.0 (96.8)	36.0 (96.8)	49.0 (120.2)
Mean daily maximum °C (°F)	19.1 (66.4)	21.1 (70.0)	24.5 (76.1)	26.8 (80.2)	28.3 (82.9)	29.2 (84.6)	28.9 (84.0)	28.5 (83.3)	25.8 (78.4)	23.6 (74.5)	21.4 (70.5)	19.9 (67.8)	24.8 (76.6)
Daily mean °C (°F)	11.9 (53.4)	13.4 (56.1)	16.7 (62.1)	19.9 (67.8)	22.0 (71.6)	23.2 (73.8)	23.2 (73.8)	22.8 (73.0)	20.6 (69.1)	17.8 (64.0)	14.8 (58.6)	12.9 (55.2)	18.3 (64.9)
Mean daily minimum °C (°F)	4.7 (40.5)	5.8 (42.4)	8.9 (48.0)	13.0 (55.4)	15.7 (60.3)	17.3 (63.1)	17.5 (63.5)	17.2 (63.0)	15.4 (59.7)	12.1 (53.8)	8.2 (46.8)	5.9 (42.6)	11.8 (53.2)
Record low °C (°F)	−13.0 (8.6)	−10.0 (14.0)	−8.0 (17.6)	−3.2 (26.2)	2.0 (35.6)	2.0 (35.6)	7.0 (44.6)	8.3 (46.9)	0.0 (32.0)	−1.0 (30.2)	−7.5 (18.5)	−10.0 (14.0)	−13.0 (8.6)
Average precipitation mm (inches)	12.3 (0.48)	9.5 (0.37)	5.8 (0.23)	13.0 (0.51)	27.4 (1.08)	26.7 (1.05)	32.9 (1.30)	30.1 (1.19)	43.9 (1.73)	20.9 (0.82)	11.1 (0.44)	12.0 (0.47)	245.6 (9.67)
Average precipitation days (≥ 0.1 mm)	2.3	1.8	1.3	2.6	4.4	3.6	4.9	4.6	4.6	3.2	1.8	2.0	37.1
Average snowy days	0.30	0.26	0.03	0.0	0.0	0.0	0.0	0.0	0.0	0.06	0.06	0.20	0.91
Source 1: Servicio Meteorológico Nacional
Source 2: Colegio de Postgraduados (snow days)

== Landmarks ==
Historical landmarks are Don Miguel Ramos Arizpe's house, father of Mexican federalism, Hacienda Santa María built in 1721, where Fr. Miguel Hidalgo celebrated his final mass, and Hacienda de Guadalupe, where the Plan de Guadalupe was signed during the Mexican Revolution in 1913.
