= General Motors W platform =

W-body
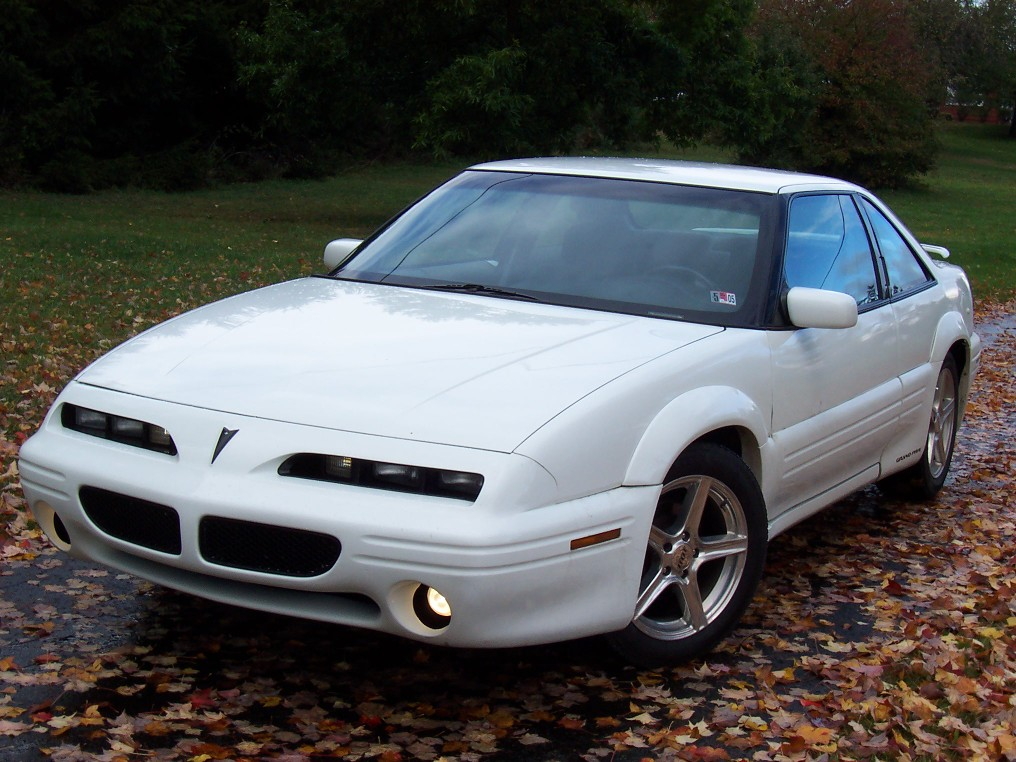
- Pontiac Grand Prix

Overview
- Manufacturer: General Motors
- Also called: GM10
- Production: 1987–2016

Body and chassis
- Class: Mid-size platform; Full size platform
- Layout: FF layout
- Body styles: 4-door sedan; 2-door coupe; 2-door convertible
- Vehicles: Buick Century; Buick LaCrosse; Buick Regal; Chevrolet Impala; Chevrolet Impala Limited; Chevrolet Lumina; Chevrolet Monte Carlo; Oldsmobile Cutlass Supreme; Oldsmobile Intrigue; Pontiac Grand Prix

Powertrain
- Engines: 122 I4; Iron Duke I4; Quad-4 I4; 60° V6; LX5 V6; High Value V6; High Feature V6; Buick V6; LS4 V8
- Transmissions: 3-speed 3T40 automatic; 4-speed 4T60 automatic; 4-speed 4T60-HD automatic; 4-speed 4T65 automatic; 4-speed 4T60-E automatic; 4-speed 4T65-E automatic; 4-speed 4T65E-HD automatic; 5-speed Getrag 282 manual; 5-speed Getrag 284 Manual; 6-speed 6T70 automatic

Dimensions
- Wheelbase: 107.5 in (2,730 mm); 109.0 in (2,769 mm); 110.5 in (2,807 mm)

Chronology
- Predecessor: GM G platform (RWD); GM A platform (FWD); GM B platform
- Successor: GM Epsilon Wide II LWB platform; GM Zeta platform (for Chevrolet SS for FWD Impala SS)

The W-platform (also known as the W-body) was a General Motors automotive platform underpinning both mid-size and full-size front-wheel drive cars across the platform's three generations from 1987 through 2016 model years.

Code-named GM10, the program began development in 1982 under Chairman Roger B. Smith. The new design debuted in 1987 with the Pontiac Grand Prix, Buick Regal, and Oldsmobile Cutlass Supreme coupes, with the four-door sedan body style introduced for 1990.

The 1997–2005 2nd Generation, or W2 Platform, used both a 110.5 in (2,807 mm) full-size wheelbase as well as a 109.0 in (2,769 mm) mid-size wheelbase.

From 2005 through 2016, the W3 Platform used a 110.5 in (2,807 mm), full-size wheelbase in sedan and coupe configurations, including for the Pontiac Grand Prix (2004-2008), Buick LaCrosse/Allure (2005-2009), Chevrolet Impala/Impala Limited (2005-2016), and Chevrolet Monte Carlo (2000-2007) — each available in high-performance V8 variants.

== History ==
The platform cost $7 billion to develop, with engineering performed by the Chevrolet-Pontiac-Canada (CPC) group, also known as the small-car division. The original program was intended to replace all mid-size cars produced by Chevrolet, Pontiac, Oldsmobile, and Buick on the G and A platforms. This ultimately did not happen; while the A-platform Chevrolet Celebrity and Pontiac 6000 were quickly discontinued, the A-body Buick Century and Oldsmobile Cutlass Ciera remained in production until 1996.

The plan was for seven GM plants that would each assemble 250,000 of the cars, or 21% of the total U.S. car market. It was badly executed from the start. The automaker's 1984 reorganization, combined with changing market dynamics, wreaked havoc with the program, and the objectives were not achieved. In 2008, prominent shareholder activist Robert A. G. Monks noted that GM had lost $2,000 on every car it produced in 1989, the year before the last of the original "GM10-based cars were launched.

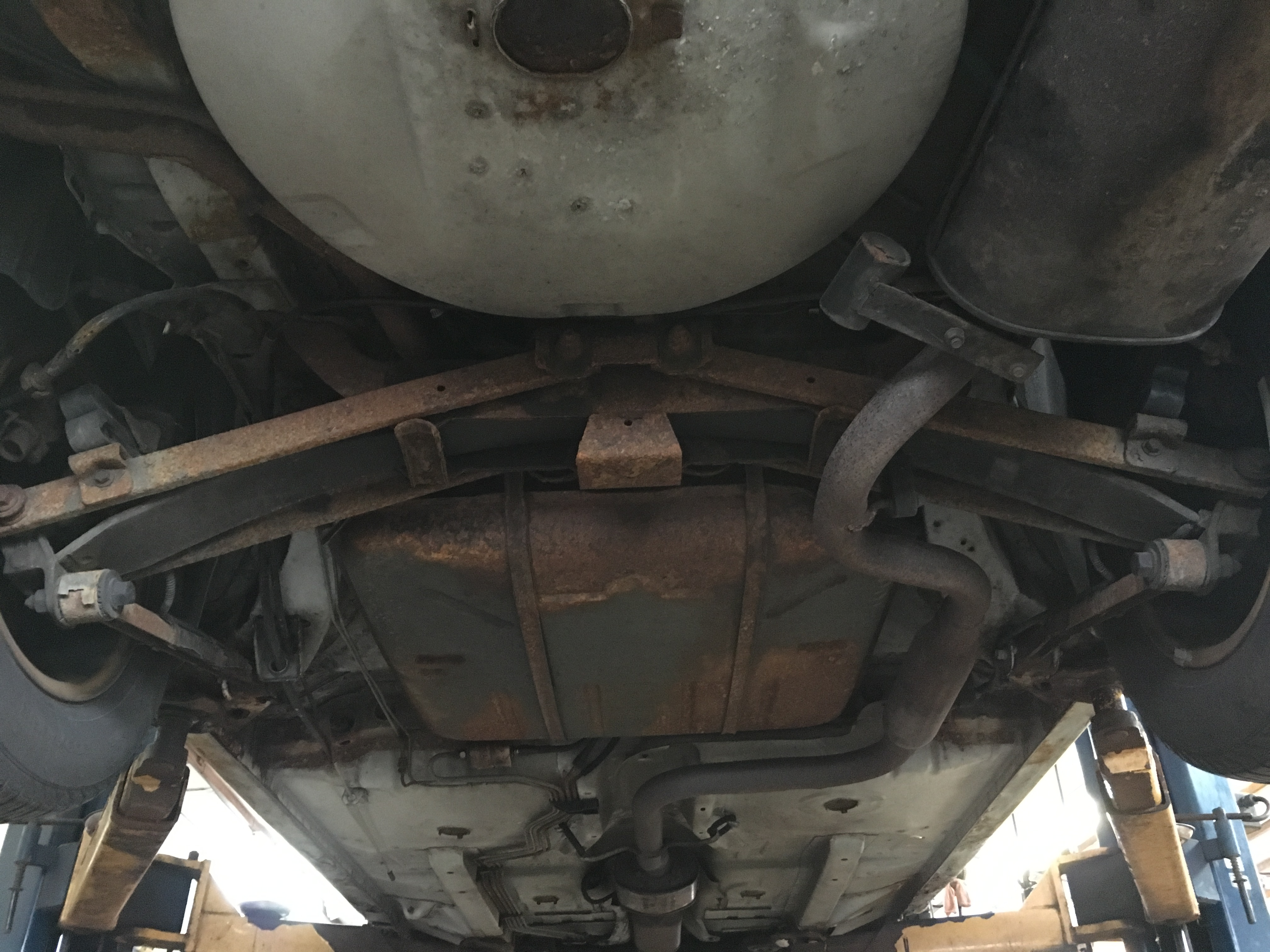
1996 Buick Regal with Transverse leaf spring rear suspension

The next iteration of the platform was known as the MS2000 or the W2 platform. Early versions used a transversely installed, fiberglass mono-leaf spring combined with struts in the rear. The "generation 1.5" W-body models had updated rear suspensions that used coil springs instead of the transverse leaf spring design inspired by the Chevrolet Corvette. For the 1997 model year, the second-generation W-body was introduced with a MacPherson strut coil-spring suspension.

A revised and updated W3 platform was introduced in 2004, rather than the stretched Epsilon platform that had been planned. Parma Metal Fabricating Division of Parma, Ohio, was responsible for metal fabrication, and final assembly took place at GM's Oshawa Car Assembly. The transverse use of GM's LS small-block engine in the W-bodies was a major addition for 2005.

The GM W Platform was phased out as production of the new long-wheelbase Epsilon II platform began. The last car produced on the W platform was the ninth-generation Chevrolet Impala, which was replaced by the Epsilon-based tenth-generation Impala, beginning in model year 2014. General Motors continued to build the W-body Impala to fleet customers only under the name Impala Limited until production ended in May 2016.

== Applications ==
Vehicles using the W-body platform include:

- 1st Gen 107.5 in (2,730 mm) wheelbase (mid-size)
  - 1988–1996 Buick Regal (2-door coupe, 4-door sedan)
  - 1988–1997 Oldsmobile Cutlass Supreme (2-door coupe, 2-door convertible, 4-door sedan)
  - 1988–1996 Pontiac Grand Prix (2-door coupe, 4-door sedan)
  - 1990–2001 Chevrolet Lumina (2-door coupe, 4-door sedan)
  - 1995–1999 Chevrolet Monte Carlo (2-door coupe)
- 2nd Gen 109.0 in (2,769 mm) wheelbase (mid-size)
  - 1997–2005 Buick Century (4-door sedan)
  - 1997–2004 Buick Regal (4-door sedan)
  - 1998–2002 Oldsmobile Intrigue (4-door sedan)
- 2nd Gen 110.5 in (2,807 mm) wheelbase (full-size)
  - 1997–2003 Pontiac Grand Prix (2-door coupe, 4-door sedan)
  - 2000–2005 Chevrolet Impala (4-door sedan)
  - 2000–2005 Chevrolet Monte Carlo (2-door coupe)
- 3rd gen 110.5 in (2,807 mm) wheelbase (full-size)
  - 2004–2008 Pontiac Grand Prix (4-door sedan)
  - 2005–2009 Buick LaCrosse/Allure (4-door sedan)
  - 2006–2016 Chevrolet Impala/Impala Limited (4-door sedan)
  - 2006–2007 Chevrolet Monte Carlo (2-door coupe)

== See also ==
- List of General Motors platforms
