= A platform =

A platform or A body may refer to:

- Chrysler A platform, in the 1960s
- General Motors A platform (RWD), 1925–1959 and 1964–1981
- General Motors A platform (FWD), 1982–1996
- Volkswagen Group A platform

== See also ==
- Troll A platform, an offshore natural gas platform in the Troll gas field
