= Oldsmobile Cutlass Ciera =

Mid-size car produced by Oldsmobile (1982–1996)

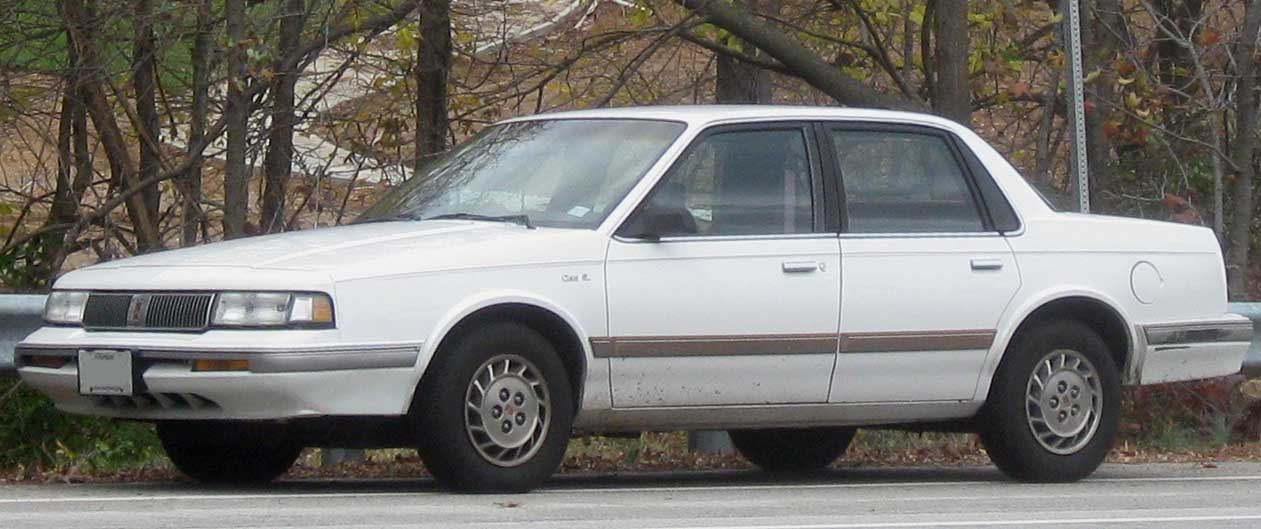

Overview
- Manufacturer: Oldsmobile (General Motors)
- Also called: Oldsmobile Ciera (1996); Oldsmobile Cutlass (Ciera) Cruiser; Cutlass by General Motors (Mexico)
- Production: September 1981–August 1996
- Model years: 1982–1996 (Ciera); 1984–1996 (Cruiser)
- Assembly: Oklahoma City, Oklahoma, United States (1989–1996); Framingham, Massachusetts, United States (1983–1989); Doraville, Georgia, United States (1982–1987); Sainte-Thérèse, Quebec, Canada (1988–1991); Fremont, California, United States (1982); Ramos Arizpe, Mexico (Cutlass by General Motors); Oshawa, Ontario, Canada (1985–1988)

Body and chassis
- Class: Mid-size
- Body style: 2-door coupe (1982–1991); 4-door sedan (1982–1996); 4-door station wagon (1984–1996)
- Layout: Transverse front-engine, front-wheel drive
- Platform: A-body
- Related: Buick Century (fifth generation); Chevrolet Celebrity; Pontiac 6000

Powertrain
- Engine: 2.2 L 122 I4; 2.5 L Tech IV I4; 2.8 L LE2 V6; 2.8 L Gen II V6; 3.0 L LK9 V6; 3.1 L Gen II V6; 3.3 L LG7 V6; 3.8 L LG3 V6; 4.3 L LT7 Diesel V6
- Transmission: GM TH-125C 3-speed automatic; GM 440-T4 4-speed automatic; GM 4T60 4-speed automatic; 4- speed manual (1984 only)

Dimensions
- Wheelbase: 104.9 in (2,664 mm)
- Length: 190.3 in (4,834 mm)
- Width: 69.5 in (1,765 mm)
- Height: 54.1 in (1,374 mm)

Chronology
- Predecessor: Oldsmobile Cutlass
- Successor: Oldsmobile Cutlass (U.S. only)

The Oldsmobile Cutlass Ciera is a mid-size car that was sold by Oldsmobile from the 1982 to 1996 model years. The replacement for the rear-wheel drive Oldsmobile Cutlass, the Cutlass Ciera marked the downsizing and transition of the mid-size Oldsmobile line to front-wheel drive, slotting it between the Omega and the Cutlass Supreme.

The Cutlass Ciera shared the front-wheel drive GM A platform with the Buick Century, Chevrolet Celebrity, and Pontiac 6000. Initially sold as a two-door and four-door sedan, the model line was expanded with the Oldsmobile Cutlass Cruiser 5-door station wagon which was built from 1984 to 1996.

Produced by GM in the United States, Canada, and Mexico, the Cutlass Ciera served as one of the best-selling model lines for the brand during its entire production (even during its final model year). For 1997, the Cutlass Ciera was replaced by the N-platform Cutlass; both it and the Achieva were replaced for 1999 by the Oldsmobile Alero.

== Background ==
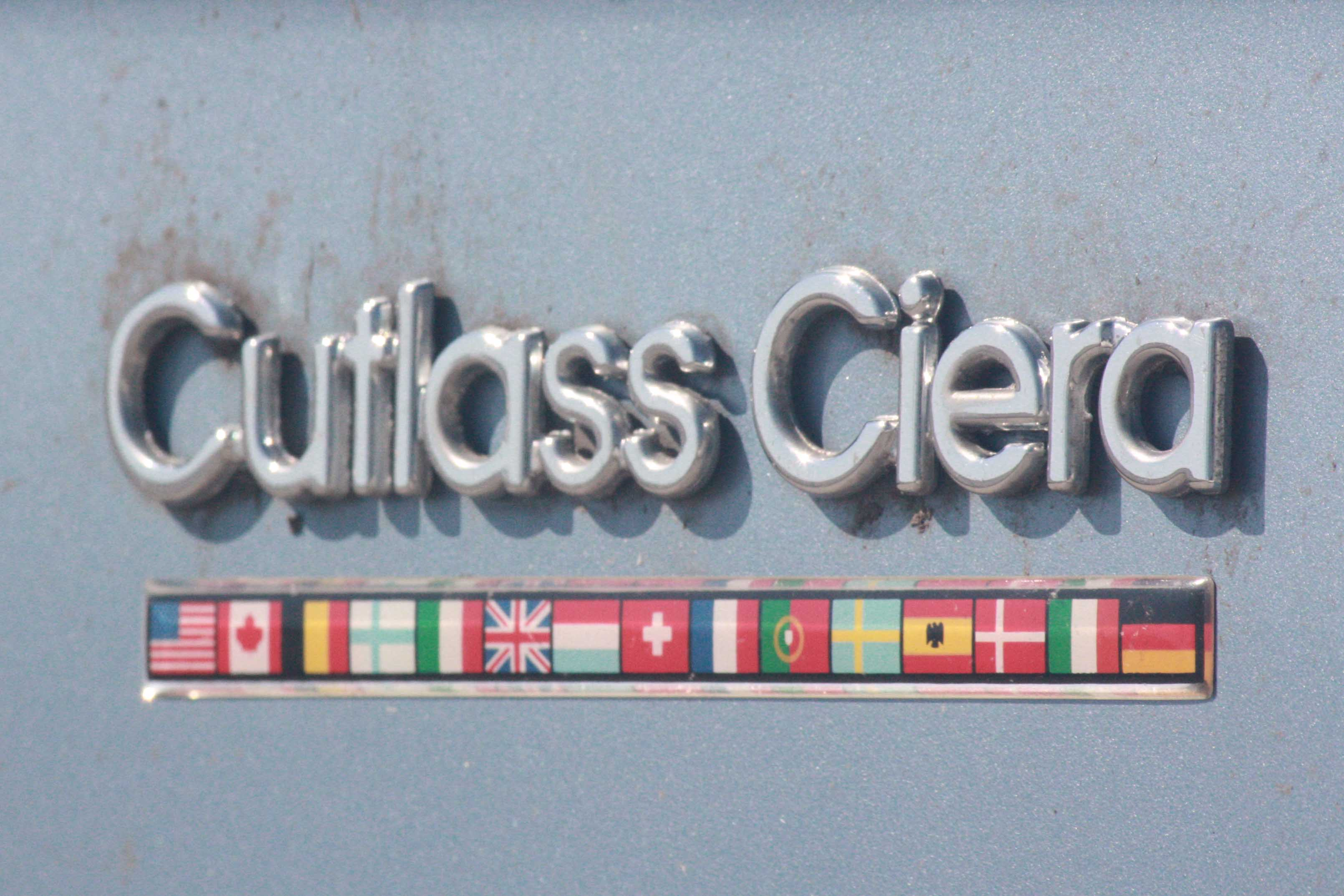
Cutlass Ciera side emblem. This emblem was used on several Oldsmobile models from the mid-1970s until the early 1990s as part of their "International" theme, which sought to compare Oldsmobile to global and domestic competitors. (From left to right, the flags are of the United States, Canada, Belgium, Finland, Italy, the United Kingdom, the Netherlands, Switzerland, France, Portugal, Sweden, Spain, Denmark, Ireland, and then West Germany; this side emblem was originally used with the Cutlass Salon during the mid-1970s when it was a competitor to the Pontiac Grand Am)

The Cutlass Ciera and its A-Body platform twins, featured MacPherson strut front suspension, body-color urethane bumpers, flush-mounted glass, front-wheel drive, and on many models, fuel injection.

The Cutlass Ciera shared the Cutlass nameplate with the smaller Cutlass Calais and the upscale Cutlass Supreme. Oldsmobile had previously used the Celebrity brand in the 1960s, but GM chose to give that name to Chevrolet. With the Ciera, Oldsmobile established Cutlass as sub-brand for its line of mainstream sedans and coupes.

Initially, the Cutlass Ciera and its platform mates were marketed as premium mid-sized cars, above the X-Body, from which they were derived, and the N-Body Calais, which would follow for 1985.

The Ciera and Cruiser replaced the rear-wheel drive G-Body Cutlass models, but strong sales kept the higher trim Cutlass Supreme in production until the 1988 model year when it was replaced by the W-Body models. As such, these front-wheel drive sedans carried the A-Body designation, previously reserved for their rear-wheel drive showroom companions. In order to keep both lines in production, General Motors rechristened the rear-wheel drive mid-sized platform as the G-Body beginning with the 1982 model year.

When the W-Body coupes were introduced for 1988, Oldsmobile reduced the number of options and configurations available. During the model years that followed, luxury and performance options such as FE3 suspension, auto calculator, bucket seats, leather seating areas, sunroofs, and full instrumentation were gradually eliminated.

Originally for 1990, the Cutlass Ciera, as with the rest of the A-body range, was intended to be phased out in favor of the more modern W-body midsized sedans. However, the Ciera, as well as its sister the Buick Century, continued to remain popular nearing the end of their initial runs. Thus, it was decided that the older Cutlass Ciera and Century would instead continue production alongside their proposed replacements, the Cutlass Supreme and Regal respectively, as lower priced alternatives.

After 1990, special editions of the Cutlass Ciera were dropped from the American market and by the end of 1991, the coupe was discontinued. Although reduced to two trim levels and two body styles, sedan and wagon, the Cieras remained the brand's best-selling line for 1996.

== 1982–1988 ==
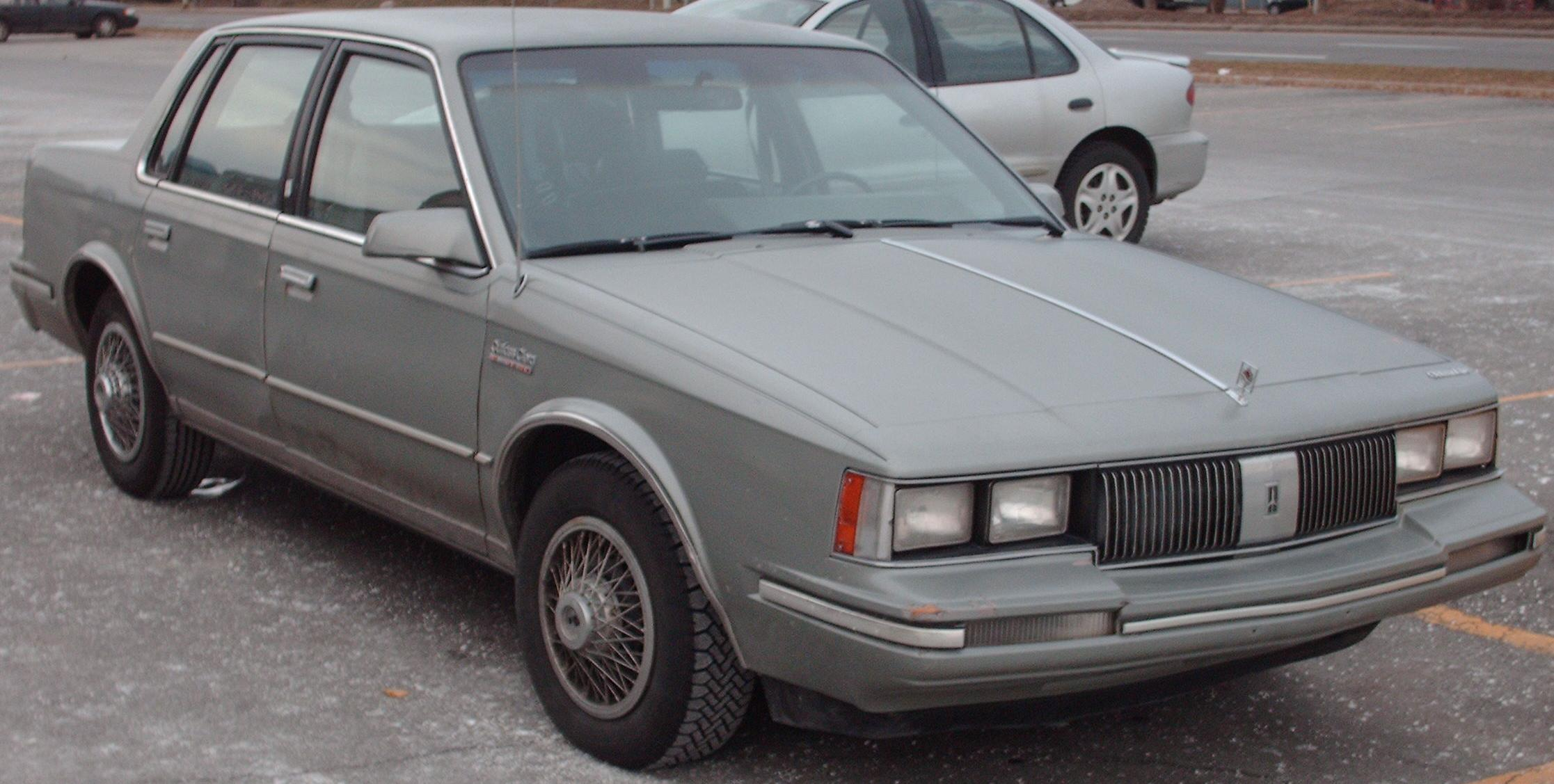
1984 Oldsmobile Cutlass Ciera Brougham sedan

Production began September 28, 1981, at Doraville Assembly in Georgia for the 1982 model year. In 1984, the Cutlass Cruiser station wagon model moved to the Cutlass Ciera's platform; previously, the nameplate used the rear wheel drive G-body. The Cutlass Ciera came in three trim levels: the base, LS, and Brougham.

The standard engine was a 2.5 L four-cylinder Tech IV (Pontiac Iron Duke) engine. All models also included standard bench seats and cloth interior. Available on all models were a 3.0 L Buick V6 engine, or a 4.3 L Oldsmobile Diesel V6 engine. Brougham trim added a plush interior with vinyl accents, leatherette interior door pulls, additional chrome trim, and a reading lamp. The base coupe and sedan were initially dropped after 1982 due to poor sales, leaving LS and Brougham trim as the only available from 1983 until 1985, excluding special editions. During the model year, production ended at the Fremont GM Assembly Plant when that facility closed.

The 1983 model year added a new ES trim package for the coupe and sedan models. This would be the last year for the standard 13-inch wheels. During the spring of 1983, a special edition Holiday Coupe was added to the option list as part of the Oldsmobile Road Show sales promotion.

For 1984, the line added a new Cruiser wagon, replacing the former G-Body Cutlass Cruiser. A 3.8 L Buick V6 became available and the Holiday Coupe package returned to the options list for its first full year as did a 4-speed manual transmission for diesel models. This transmission was dropped in the fall of 1983 from the option list. A 4-speed automatic transmission with overdrive was first available for 1984, optional with the 3.0L V6 and 4.3L diesel V6, and standard with the 3.8L V6.

For 1985, the Cutlass Ciera received its first facelift with a revised grille, headlamps, taillights, and interiors. The GT coupe was added as a companion to the ES sedan. In spring 1985 the Oldsmobile designed 4.3 L diesel was dropped due to poor sales. Canadian models added the 2.8 L 2bbl V6 this year.

For 1986, the Cutlass Ciera's grille had expanded ventilation sections than the similar 1985 model. The coupe received a revised roofline that was not initially shared with the other GM A-body models, but later migrated to the Buick Century coupe. These models are identifiable by their revised roofline and updated VIN identification, which replaced the "27" coupe designation used from 1982 until March 1986 with "37". 1986 also saw the addition of the 2.8 L V6 in place of the previously offered Buick 3.0 L V6 in the American market. The 2.8 L engine had previously been offered in Canadian Ciera's with the 2-barrel carburetor. In compliance with safety regulations, the 1986 Ciera was the first to have a high mount brake light as standard equipment. The Cutlass Ciera nameplate appeared on the rear fiberglass panel, just below the trunk lid.

For 1987, the Cutlass Ciera was facelifted again with a new grille, an updated steering wheel had the Oldsmobile logo moved from the right to the very center, and the 2.8 L LE2 V6 engine was dropped in favor of the more powerful LB6 unit. In addition, Brougham and GT models received composite headlamps as standard equipment. The 2.5 L Iron Duke 4 cylinder received minor updates, including a serpentine belt, which replaced the previous engine belt set up, for a boost of 6 horsepower, to 98. Ciera's tail lamps were slightly revised, adding ribs to their lower quarter.

For 1988, the base Cutlass Ciera received composite headlamps, the new International Series models were introduced, and this would be the last year for the Brougham, which was rechristened the Brougham SL on coupe models. The International Series included the emblem with the flags of various countries in a circular pattern on the front header panel and b pillars with the name "International Series" written across a black and chrome globe in the center. The International Series was available in coupe and sedan body styles. This model came equipped with a standard Buick 3.8 L V6 engine, 4-speed automatic transmission, sporty exhaust system, front bucket seats, and power windows. Sedan models could have the new power sliding sunroof for the first time.

=== Engines ===
Years	Engine	Power	Torque
1982–1986	2.5 L (151 cu in) Tech IV I4	92 hp (69 kW)	135 lb⋅ft (183 N⋅m)
1987–1988	2.5 L (151 cu in) Tech IV I4	98 hp (73 kW)	135 lb⋅ft (183 N⋅m)
1986*	2.8 L (173 cu in) LE2 V6	112 hp (84 kW)	145 lb⋅ft (197 N⋅m)
1987–1988	2.8 L (173 cu in) LB6 V6	125 hp (93 kW)	160 lb⋅ft (220 N⋅m)
1982–1985	3.0 L (181 cu in) LK9 V6	110 hp (82 kW)	145 lb⋅ft (197 N⋅m)
1982–1985	4.3 L (262 cu in) Oldsmobile diesel V6	85 hp (63 kW)	165 lb⋅ft (224 N⋅m)
1984–1985	3.8 L (231 cu in) LG2 V6	125 hp (93 kW)	195 lb⋅ft (264 N⋅m)
1986–1988	3.8 L (231 cu in) LG2 V6	150 hp (112 kW)	200 lb⋅ft (270 N⋅m)

- Note the 2.8 L V6 was offered in Canadian market Cutlass Ciera and Cruiser models from 1982 to 1986.

=== Trim levels and Special Edition availability ===
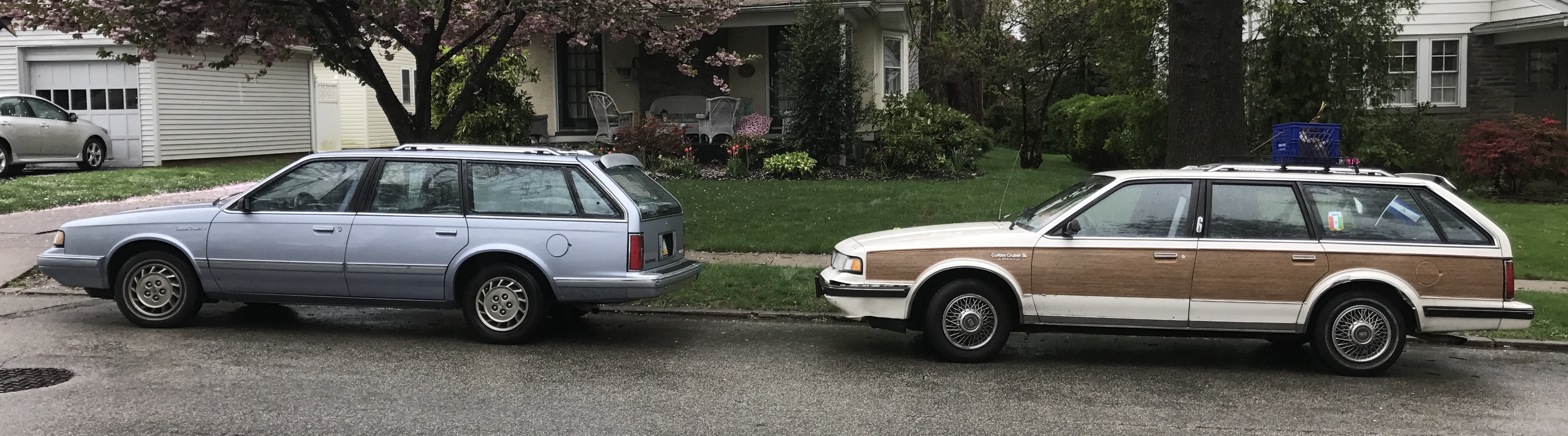
A pair of Cutlass Cruiser wagons, one with simulated woodgrain trim

- base: 1982 and 1986–1988
- Brougham: 1982–1988
- Holiday Coupe: 1984–1986 (dropped mid-1986 when the updated roof line appeared)
- ES: 1984–1986
- LS: 1982–1985
- GT: 1985–1987
- S: 1986–1987
- "XC Special Edition": 1988
- SL: 1986–1988
- International Series: 1988

== 1989–1996 ==
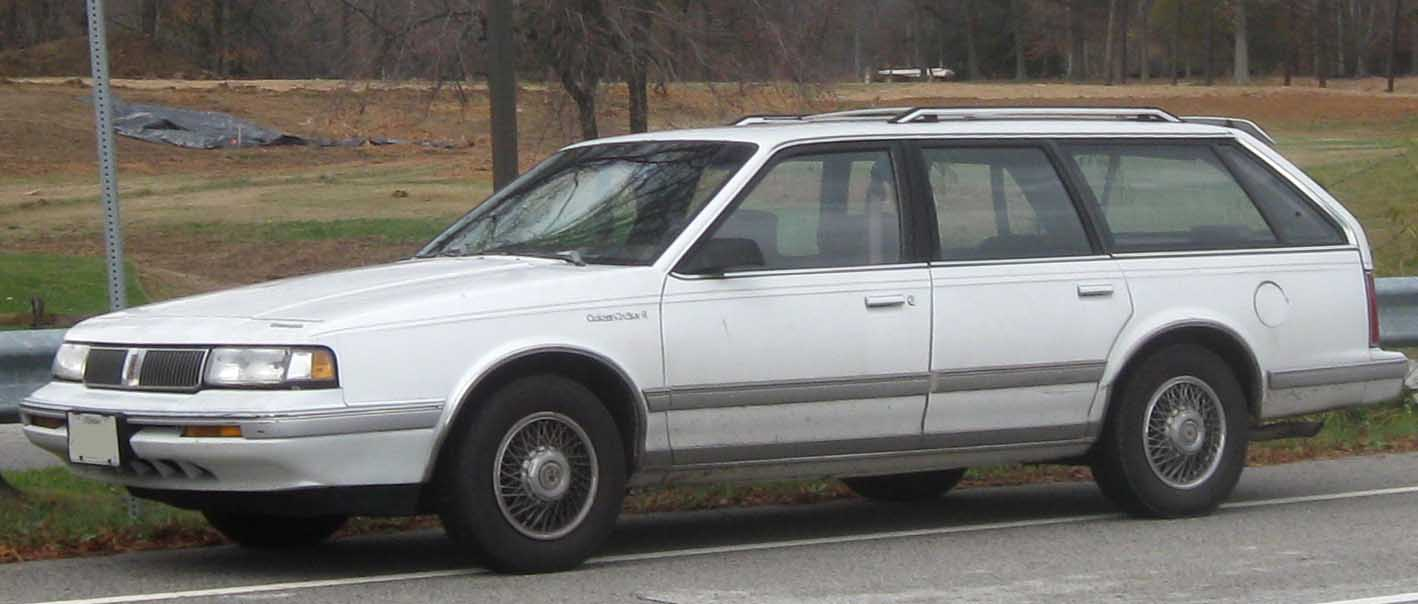
1990–1995 Cutlass Cruiser wagon

The Cutlass Ciera was updated for 1989, with the sedan receiving a roofline similar to the coupe, revised body side moldings, deletion of hood ornaments and addition of rear seat shoulder belts. Both coupe and sedan models received updated rear-end treatments. The older Buick 3.8 L V6 was dropped in favor of GM's new 3300 V6 engine. The Brougham trim level was discontinued and replaced by an upper-level SL version. The XC trim level became optional on the station wagon.

For 1990, the front seat belts were moved from the B-pillars to the doors. This would also be the last year for the 'International Series' and 'XC'.

The 1991 Cutlass Ciera was given a new taillight treatment with body-colored frames to divide the lenses into three horizontal slots at the expense of the Oldsmobile rocket insignias. Interior changes for 1991 included a new instrument cluster with a trip odometer and an engine temperature gauge. Six-speaker sound systems were added as were a remote lock fob and improved body acoustics. This would be the last year for the coupe in the United States and Canada, but it would continue on in the Mexican market.

For 1992, the coupe was dropped, and the line-up included only sedans and station wagons in 'S' or 'SL' designations. The wagon now competed internally with the Oldsmobile Silhouette minivan (based on the Cutlass Supreme's W-platform), offering buyers a choice of wagon or a minivan. The Ciera remained Oldsmobile's best-selling model line, with over 132,000 sedans and an additional 7,793 station wagons produced this year.

For 1993, the 2.5 L Tech IV engine was replaced by the 2.2 L "2200" OHV engine with a 3-speed automatic transmission.

In 1994, the 'SL' designation was dropped. The 'Cutlass Ciera S', available in sedan or station wagon form, featured a driver airbag as standard equipment, along with anti-lock brakes, adjustable steering column, electric rear-window defogger, automatic door locks, and delay wipers. The 3.1 L, Chevrolet V6 engine with a 4-speed automatic transmission replaced the prior year's 3300 Buick V6. This engine was standard on the Cruiser wagon and optional on the sedan. The 2200 I-4 received minor updates, resulting in a 10-horsepower increase.

For 1995, the 'SL' designation returned in place of the 'S'. The 1995 Cutlass Ciera SL featured a new shift interlock system that required stepping on the brake pedal before moving the gear shift out of the park position.

For 1996, the final model year, the 'Cutlass' nomenclature was dropped and the car was now known simply as the 'Ciera SL', which continued to be available in 'Series I' or 'Series II' equipment levels. The chrome "Oldsmobile" badge above the driver's headlight was deleted. As Oldsmobile attempted to reposition itself as a European-styled upscale make with new products such as the Aurora, the Cutlass Ciera continued to have strong sales. Because the tooling for the A-body platform had long since been monetized, GM was guaranteed a profit off each Cutlass Ciera and Buick Century sold. At the same time, GM was losing money on its other midsized platform, the W-platform. Production of the Ciera ended on August 30, 1996. It was replaced in the U.S. by the N-body 1997 Oldsmobile Cutlass, also built at the Oklahoma City assembly plant. As a result, the 1996 Cruiser wagon was the final Oldsmobile station wagon model produced. Sales of this Cutlass peaked at 53,438 in 1998 and it was discontinued in 1999.

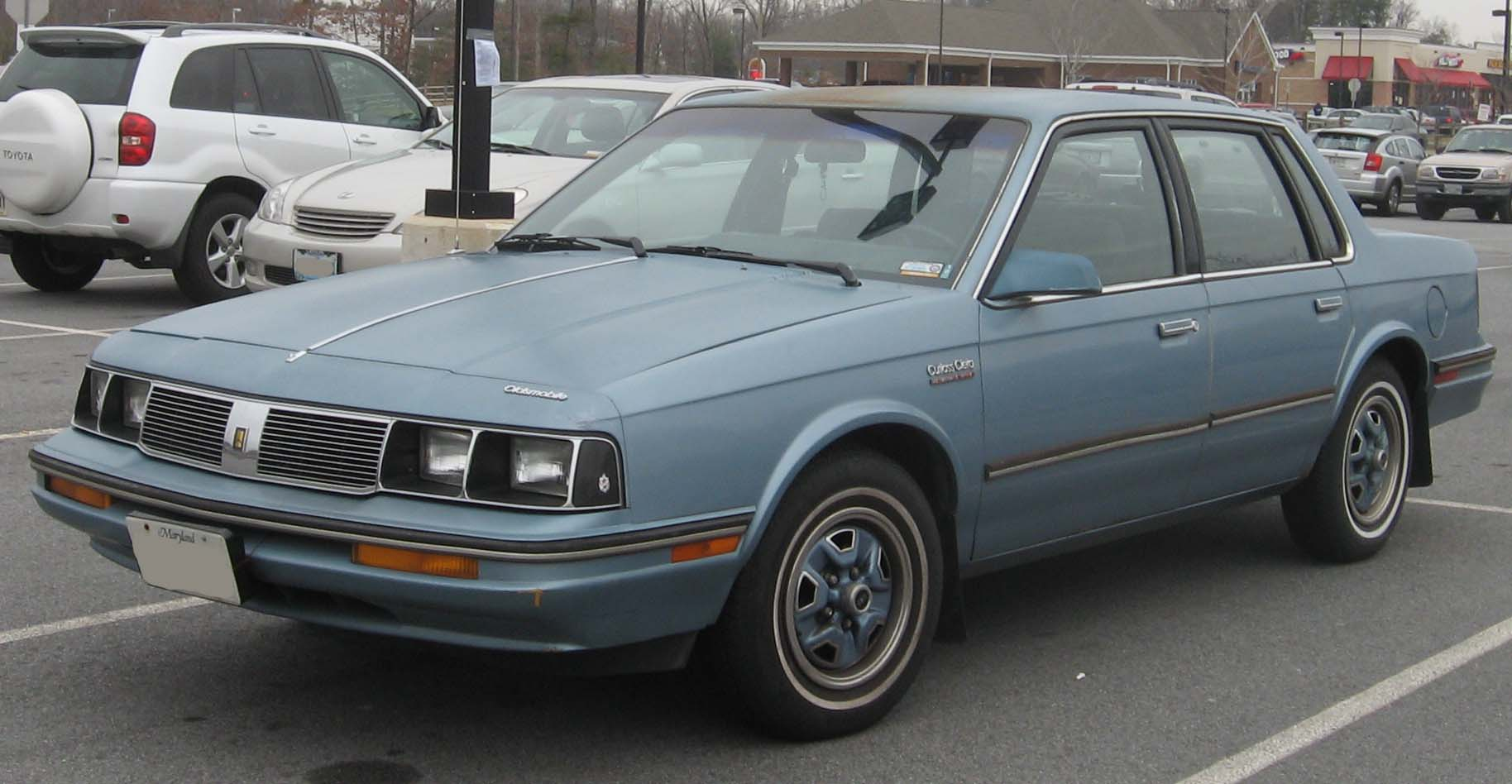
1987 Cutlass Ciera sedan

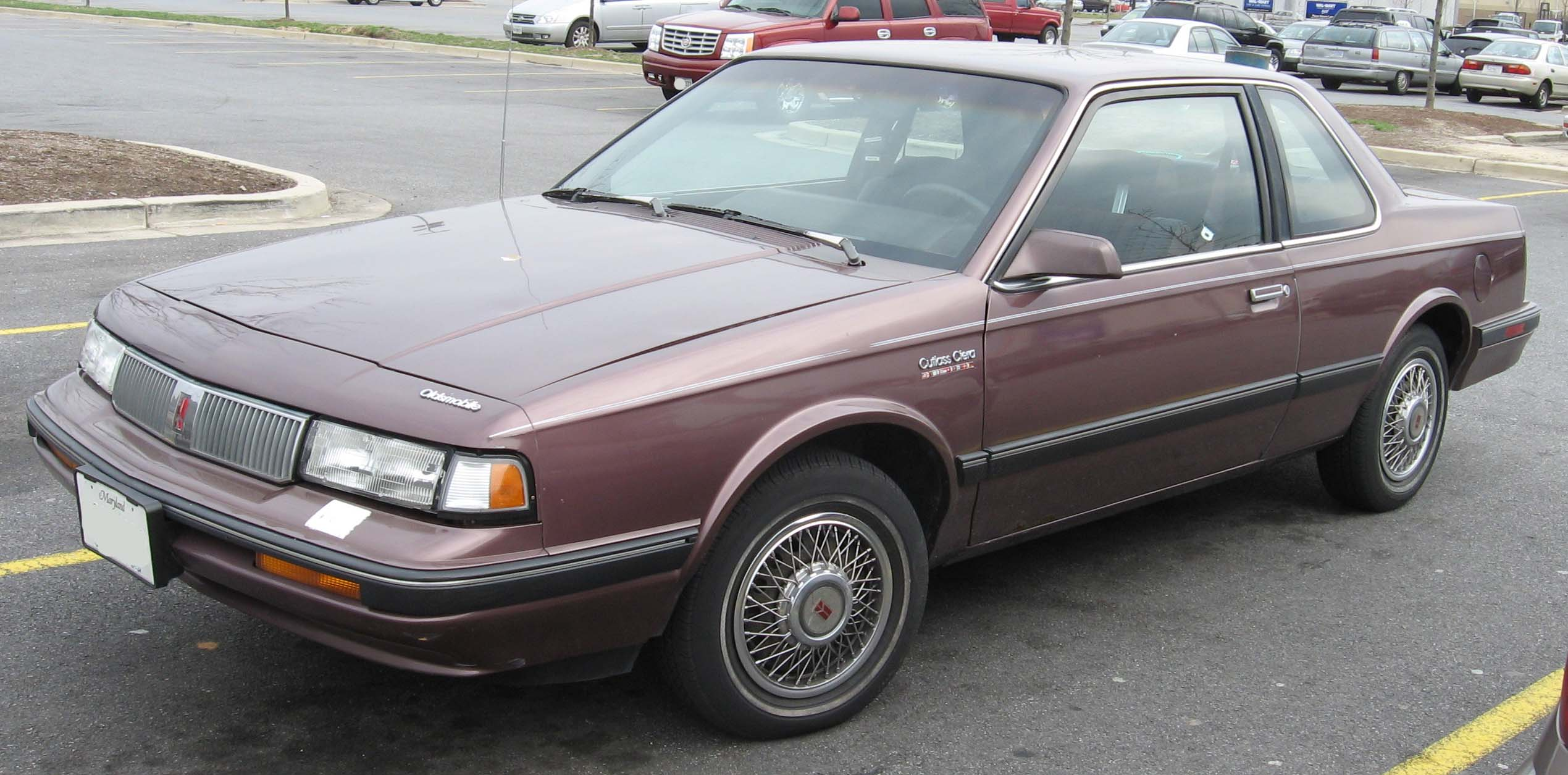
1989 Cutlass Ciera coupe

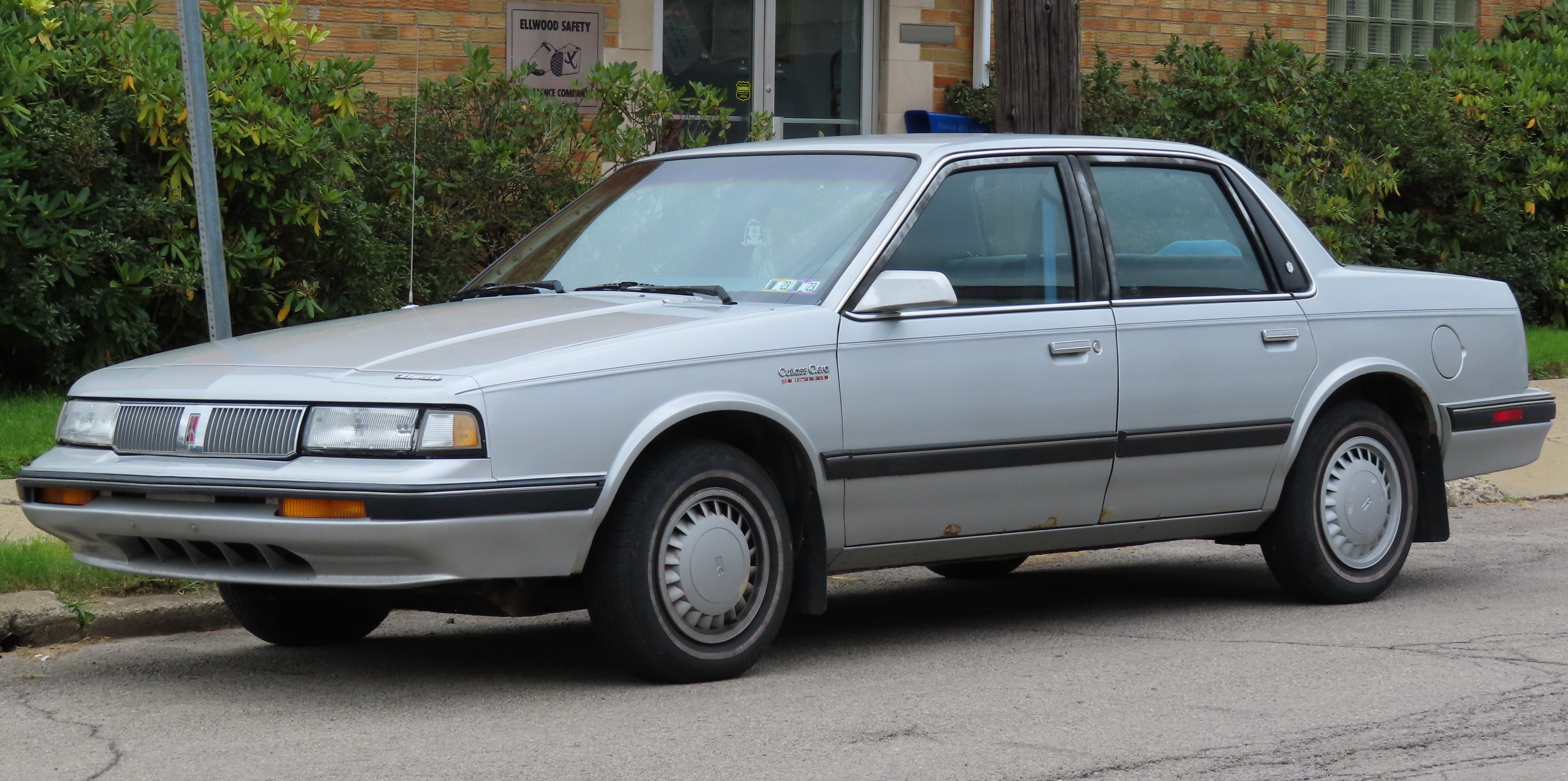
1990 Oldsmobile Cutlass Ciera sedan

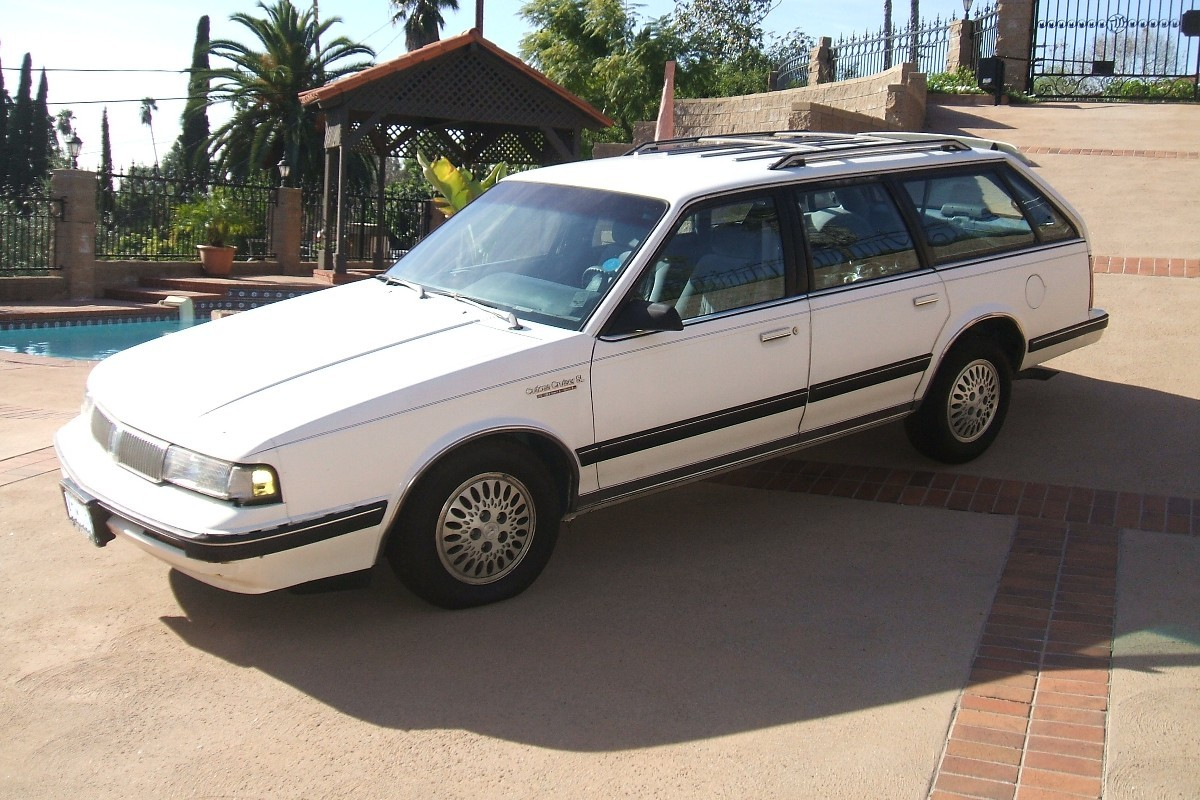
1992 Cutlass Cruiser SL

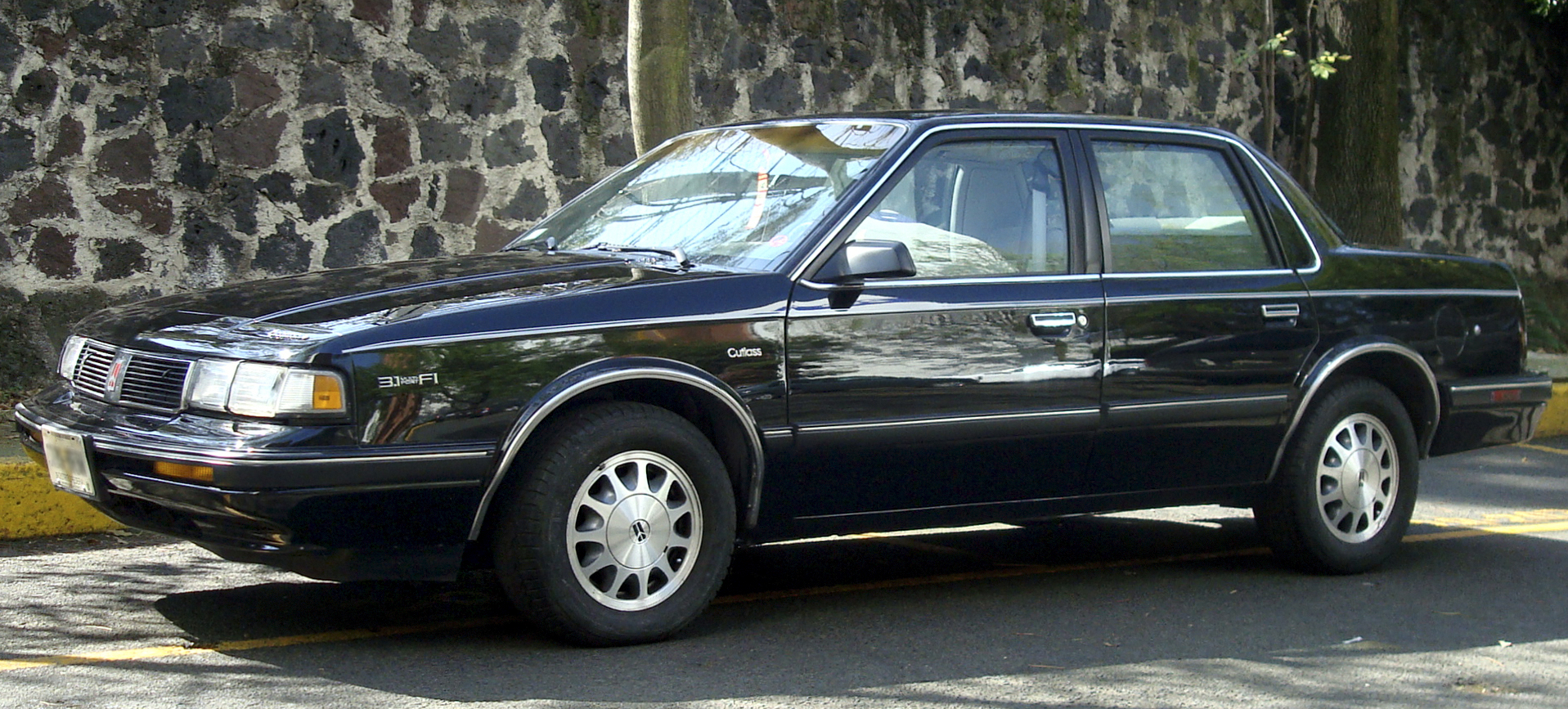
1993 Cutlass by General Motors (Mexico)

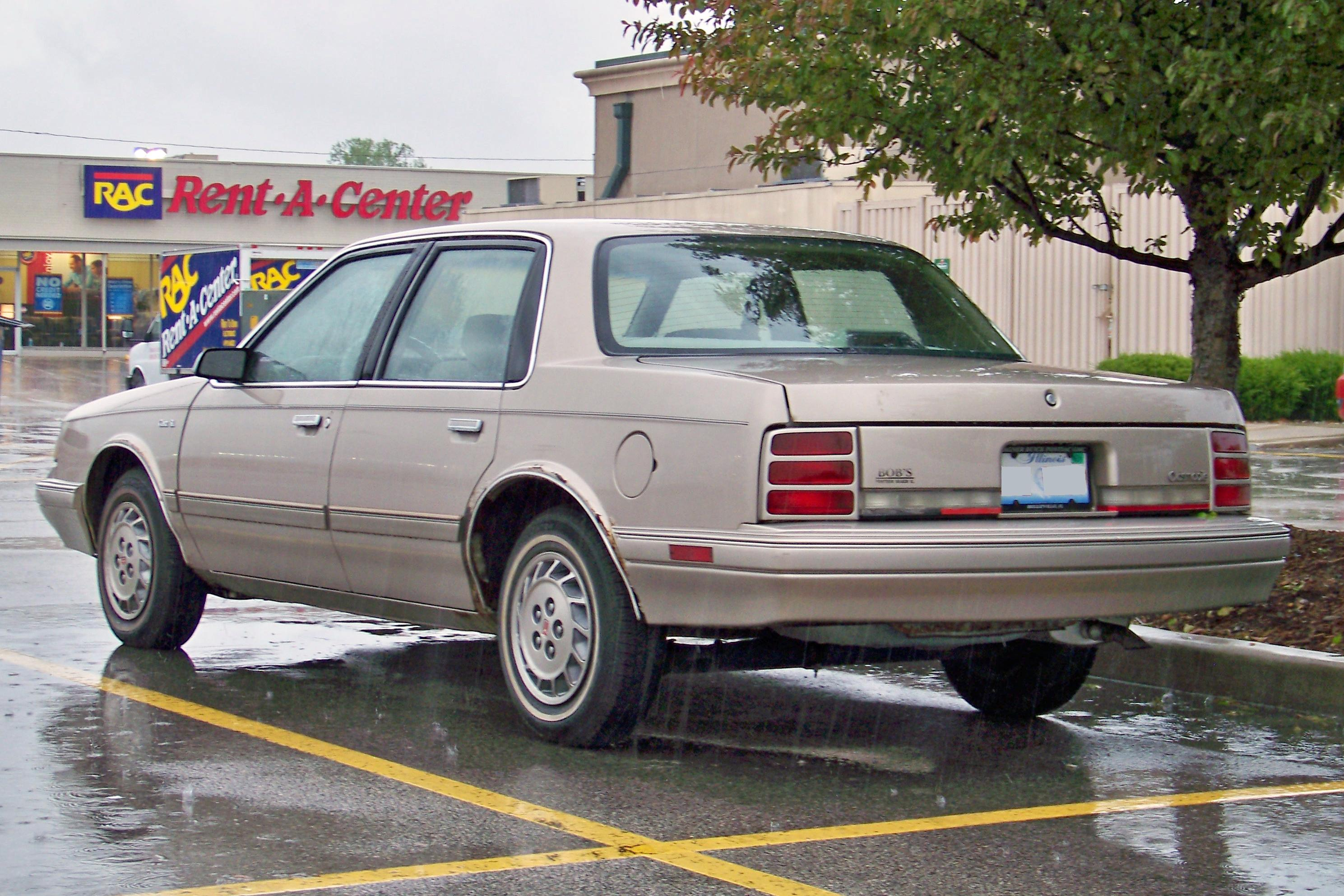
1996 Ciera SL rear

=== Engines ===
Years	Engine	Power	Torque
1989–1992	2.5 L (151 cu in) Tech IV I4	110 hp (82 kW)	135 lb⋅ft (183 N⋅m)
1989	2.8 L (173 cu in) LB6 V6	125 hp (93 kW)	160 lb⋅ft (217 N⋅m)
1989–1993	3.3 L (204 cu in) Buick V6	160 hp (119 kW)	185 lb⋅ft (251 N⋅m)
1994–1996	3.1 L (191 cu in) L82 V6	160 hp (119 kW)	185 lb⋅ft (251 N⋅m)
1993	2.2 L (134 cu in) 2200 I4	110 hp (82 kW)	130 lb⋅ft (176 N⋅m)
1994–1996	2.2 L (134 cu in) 2200 I4	120 hp (89 kW)	140 lb⋅ft (190 N⋅m)

=== Trim levels ===
The trim levels for the 1989–1995 Cutlass Ciera and 1996 Ciera are in order of price position.

  - base: 1989–1991
  - Special Edition: 1994
  - S: 1990–1994
  - SL: 1989–1994
  - SL Series I: 1995–1996
  - SL Series II: 1995–1996
  - International Series: 1989–1990
  - XC: 1989–1990

== Special editions ==
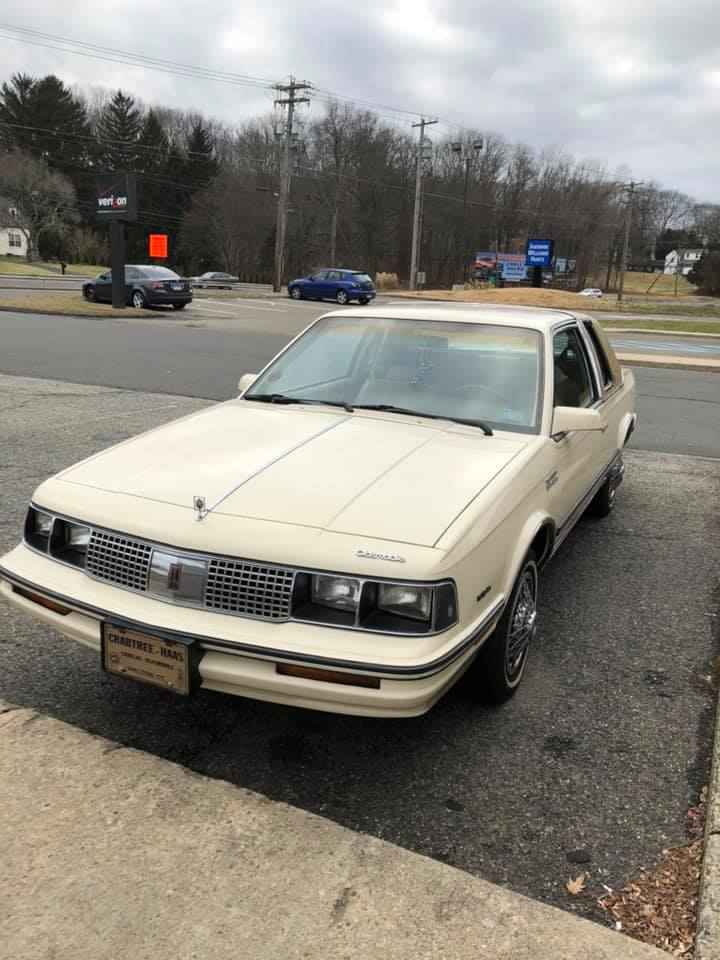
1985 Cutlass Ciera Holiday coupe (RPO WJ5)

Factory specialty models of the Cutlass Ciera included the Holiday Coupe, GT, ES, XC, and International Series models – the latter had a stock body kit.

Holiday Coupe – From 1984 to March 1986, Oldsmobile offered a special edition Holiday Coupe package, option WJ5, on the Brougham coupe. This package included a unique landau vinyl roof (RPO C10), opera windows, special rooftop trim, and painted pinstripes. The Holiday Coupe package required tinted glass and could not be ordered with standard pinstripes. It was discontinued partway through the 1986 model year when Oldsmobile introduced the updated coupe roofline. All Holiday coupes were converted by the American Sunroof Company (ASC) outside of the factory. Oldsmobile would ship ASC Brougham coupes equipped with tinted glass to modify at their facility. These models have an ASC decal in the driver's side door frame indicating the factory authorized conversion.

ES – The ES (RPO W48) sedan was available from 1983 through 1985 model years. These vehicles feature unique wheel covers, blacked-out trim, F41 performance suspension, black sidewall tires, a center console with bucket seats, and a sports steering wheel. For 1985 only the ES sedan returned, as the coupe had been renamed GT.

GT – The GT (RPO W45) was first offered as an option on the 1985 Ciera coupe. It featured blacked-out trim, V6 engine, a center console with bucket seats, fog lamps factory body kit, alloy wheels, and performance suspension. For 1986, it was expanded to the four-door sedan, replacing the ES. Following the 1987 model year, it was replaced by the International Series.

International Series – From 1988 through 1990 model years, the International Series (RPO W45/W49) was the top performance trim available on the Ciera. It featured the 3.8 L V6 for 1988 and the 3.3 L V6 for 1989 and 1990. Available on coupe and sedan models, it featured a factory body kit, bucket seats with console, FE3 performance suspension, alloy wheels, full instrumentation, air conditioning, JA2 heavy-duty brakes, extra capacity cooling, and unique ornamentation.

XC – The XC was introduced as part of Oldsmobile's 90th Anniversary celebrations (XC being Roman Numeral for 90) and remained on the option sheet from 1988 until 1990. It was available on coupe and sedan models. Sharing much of its sporty appearance with the International Series, the XC is distinguished by orange body side stripes in place of the typical black and chrome trim. Unlike the similar-looking International Series, the XC package did not include a standard V6, 4-speed automatic, or other higher-end features. These had to be ordered in addition to the XC package.

== Convertible ==
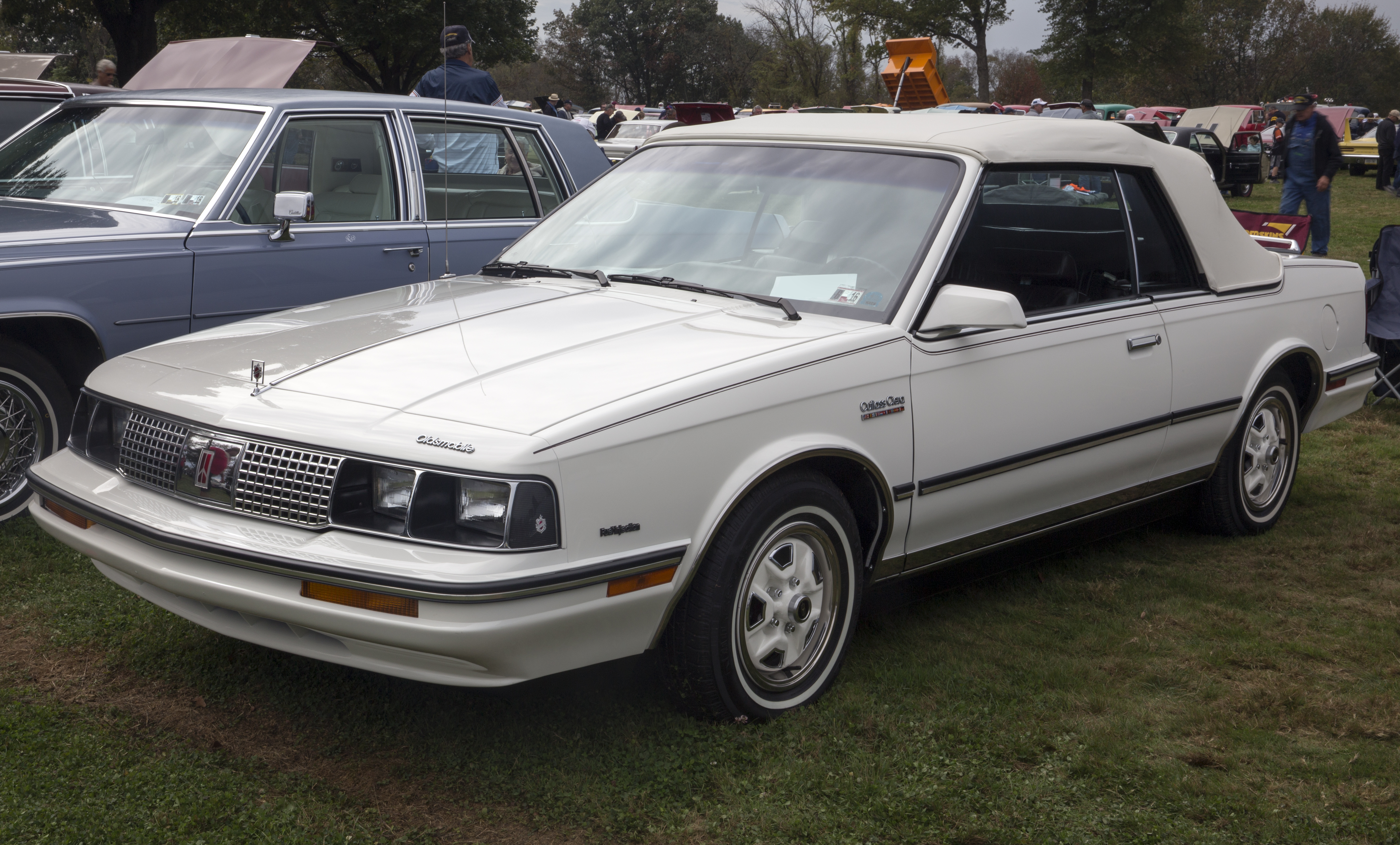
1985 Cutlass Ciera Convertible conversion by Hess & Eisenhardt

Oldsmobile never officially produced a factory-built convertible of the Cutlass Ciera for public sale, but many dealers made them available via aftermarket conversions. Between 1983 and 1986, 814 Cutlass Ciera convertibles were made by Hess & Eisenhardt/Car Craft. These vehicles were Brougham (1983 to mid-1986) and SL (mid-1986) coupes, modified with leather interior and chassis reinforcement to provide the needed structural rigidity that was lost by removing the roof.

== International sales ==
Throughout much of its history, the Cutlass Ciera was offered in several global markets. In Mexico, local production allowed for unique models under the name Cutlass (by General Motors). Many people were confused by this since it was invoiced as a Chevrolet and they were sold through Mexican Chevrolet dealers, but these models never wore Chevrolet badges. They were available as Cutlass and Cutlass Eurosport (similar to the American International Series) with more sporty orientation. Early models were produced with the 2.8 L MPFI V6, and later variants from 1992 got it replaced by a 3.1 L. In 1993, the Cutlass Eurosport received a redesign. The Mexican Cutlass was available in sedan and coupé until their discontinuation in 1996. The Cutlass was only available with a 3 speed automatic transmission and the Cutlass Eurosport was available with both the 5-speed manual transmission and the 3-speed automatic.

== Awards ==
The Cutlass Ciera consistently ranked among the highest-rated vehicles by J.D. Power and Associates; it was ranked the "Best in Price Class" on July 30, 1992, and the "Top-Ranked American-Made Car" on May 28, 1992. It was also named "Safe Car of the Year" by Prevention Magazine on March 6, 1992.
