= General Motors A platform (FWD) =

GM A platform
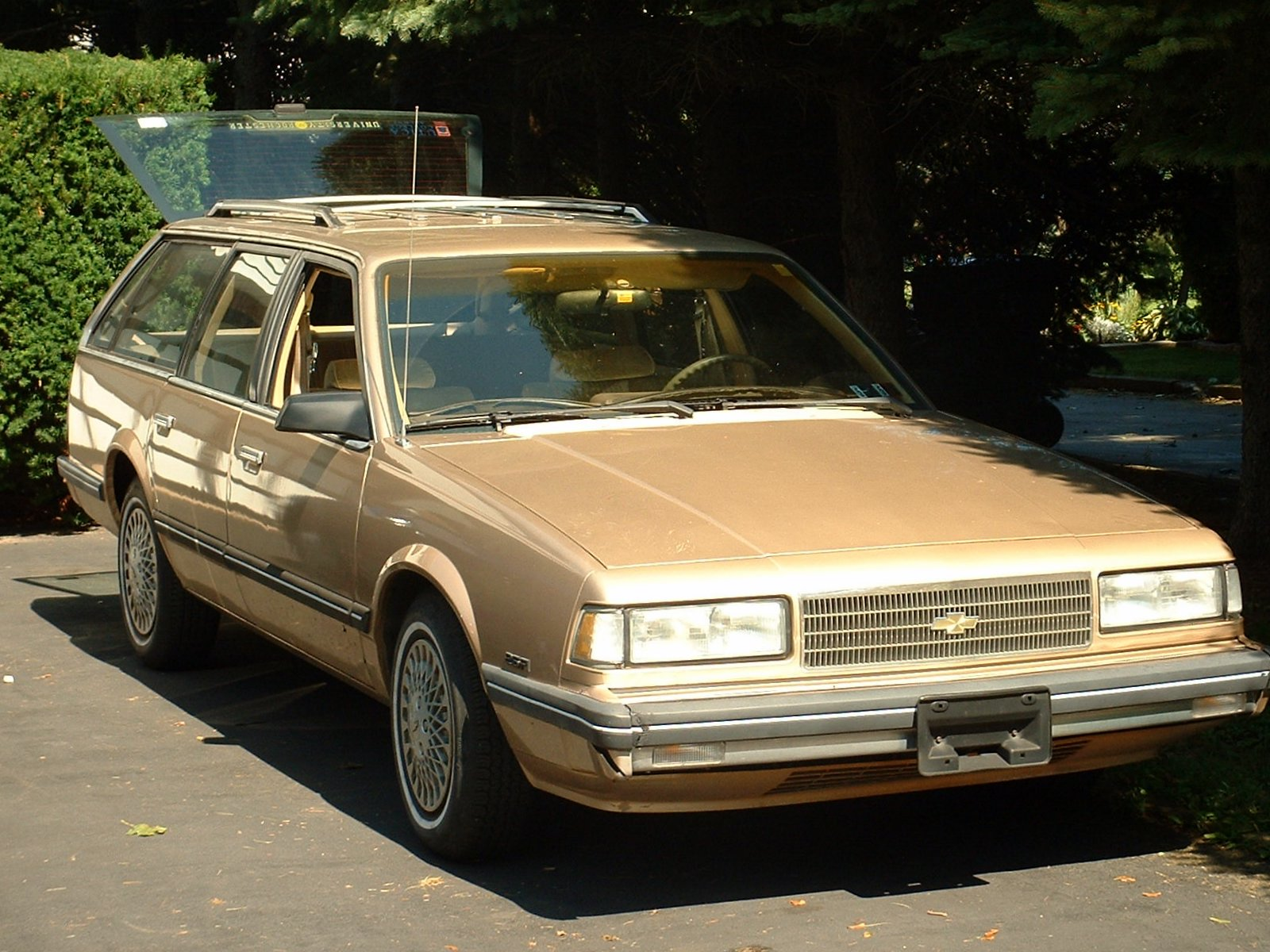
- 1987 Chevrolet Celebrity

Overview
- Manufacturer: General Motors
- Production: 1982–1996

Body and chassis
- Class: Mid-size
- Layout: Front engine, front-wheel drive/all-wheel drive (Pontiac 6000 only)
- Body styles: 2-door coupe 4-door sedan 4-door station wagon
- Vehicles: Buick Century; Chevrolet Celebrity; Oldsmobile Cutlass Ciera/Cruiser; Pontiac 6000

Powertrain
- Engines: Gasoline: 122 I4; Iron Duke I4; 60° V6; Buick V6; Diesel: Oldsmobile V6
- Transmissions: 3-speed 3T40 automatic 4-speed 4T60 automatic 4-speed 4T60-E automatic 5-speed Getrag manual

Dimensions
- Wheelbase: 104.5 in (2,654 mm); 104.9 in (2,664 mm)

Chronology
- Predecessor: GM A platform (1936)
- Successor: GM W platform GM N platform

The General Motors A platform (informally called the A-body) was a mid-size platform designation used from 1982 to 1996. The same designation had previously been used for rear wheel drive mid-sized cars.

The A platform was shared by the Buick Century, Oldsmobile Cutlass Ciera, Pontiac 6000 and Chevrolet Celebrity. As part of their legacy, they became enormously popular — as well as synonymous with GM's most transparent example of badge engineering: the four were highlighted almost indistinguishably on the August 22, 1983 cover of Fortune magazine as examples of genericized uniformity, embarrassing the company and ultimately prompting GM to recommit to design leadership.

Introduced for the 1982 model year, the A-Bodies were essentially similar in mechanical layout and interior space to the troubled X-car compacts on which they were based. With greater overall length allowed, they were classified as intermediates. Initially all four lines offered two and four door sedans for 1982. In 1984, a wagon was offered, replacing the rear wheel drive G-Body wagons, discontinued in 1983.

Vehicles using the A platform were initially offered alongside other GM rear-drive nameplates, e.g., the Malibu, in the intermediate class — eventually supplanting them in 1989.

== Platform updates ==
The A-body eventually consisted of a 4-door sedan, 2-door coupé and a 4-door station wagon.

- 1982: The Chevrolet Celebrity, Pontiac 6000, Oldsmobile Cutlass Ciera and Buick Century two and four door models are introduced.
- 1983: Pontiac introduces the sporty STE variant of their 6000. Oldsmobile introduces the ES performance package for their Cutlass Ciera four door models.
- 1984: All four divisions now offered the new wagon body style. Oldsmobile introduces the Holiday Coupe package on their Cutlass Ciera Brougham coupes.
- 1985: Oldsmobile introduces an updated Cutlass Ciera with more aerodynamic front and rear styling, an updated interior and a new GT coupe model. The Oldsmobile 4.3 liter diesel engine was dropped after this model year.
- 1986: Mid year, the Oldsmobile Cutlass Ciera gets a unique roofline. The Buick Century is restyled.
- 1988: Pontiac offers all wheel drive on their 6000 STE exclusively. All models moved to composite headlamps. Oldsmobile dropped the Brougham nameplate from their Ciera line.
- 1989: the Celebrity drops its two-door models. The Cutlass Ciera, Century and 6000 receive major updates.
- 1990: the Celebrity drops its four-door models, leaving only the station wagon.
- 1991: The Pontiac 6000 (all models), Chevrolet Celebrity wagon and Oldsmobile Cutlass Ciera coupe are dropped.
- 1993: Buick dropped the Century coupe.
- 1996: For the final year of the A-Body, Oldsmobile drops the Cutlass name, simply calling their sedan the Oldsmobile Ciera.

It was updated in 1989 with a slightly longer wheelbase and a more rounded roofline (except for the Celebrity whose roofline remained unchanged as it was to be phased out in 1990). It also briefly saw duty as an all wheel drive platform for the Pontiac 6000.

Later GM platforms (specifically transaxle based, i.e. four-wheel drive and mid-engine rear-wheel drive) benefited from components and systems developed with the A-Body. Additionally the first generation U-body minivan (1990–1996) was constructed utilizing a lightly modified version of the A-body chassis.

The A-body began to be phased out in favor of the GM W platform beginning in 1990, although production did not end for the platform until 1996 due to popularity of the remaining models.

== Vehicles ==
- 1982–1990 Chevrolet Celebrity
- 1982–1991 Pontiac 6000
- 1982–1995 Oldsmobile Cutlass Ciera
- 1996 Oldsmobile Ciera (final year of the Cutlass Ciera and Cutlass Cruiser, sold without the "Cutlass" name)
- 1982–1996 Buick Century

== See also ==
- List of General Motors platforms
- General Motors A platform
