= Parma Metal Center =

Factory in Cleveland, Ohio, United States

Coordinates: 41°25′00″N 81°46′23″W

The Parma MFD (Metal Fabricating Division) is a General Motors stamping and metal assembly plant located on the south side of Cleveland, Ohio in the suburb of Parma — and a key part of the town's economic vibrancy. The plant supplies stamped metal parts and metal assemblies to numerous GM assembly plants located across North America, including specialized parts which have allowed it to continue to exist despite the downsizing of other auto industry plants.

During the tumultuous years surrounding the 2009 General Motors Chapter 11 reorganization, Parma MFD worked to make its stamping operations more lean and relevant to GM's production, and worked with management and union leadership to increase productivity and adapt the plant to new requirements — ultimately remaining vital to GM's production systems. Parma MFD's fate was nonetheless highly tied to GM's brand strategies and overall health.
