= Oldsmobile Diesel engine =

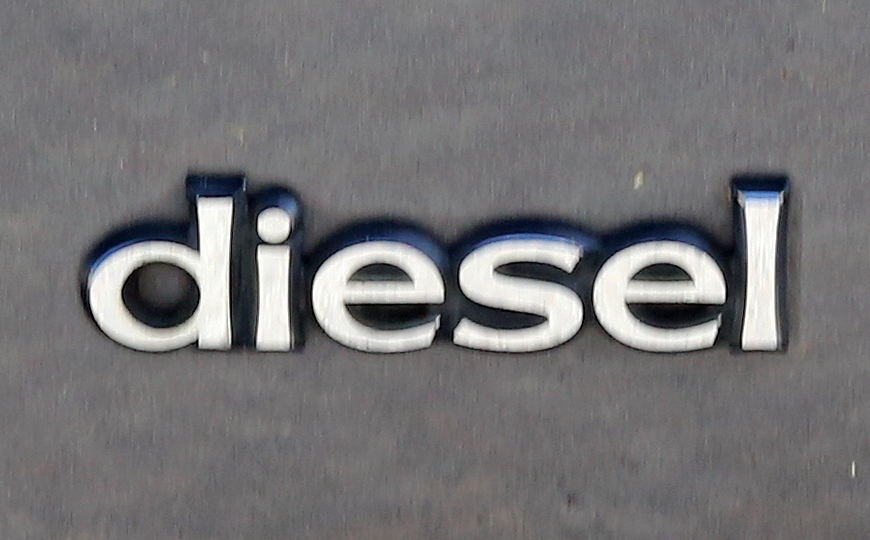
- Badge of the Oldsmobile Diesel on a Buick

Overview
- Manufacturer: Oldsmobile
- Production: 1978–1985

Layout
- Configuration: V6; V8
- Displacement: V6: 262.55 cu in (4,302 cc); V8: 260.54 cu in (4,269 cc); 350.06 cu in (5,736 cc)
- Cylinder bore: 3 1/2 in (88.9 mm); 4.057 in (103.0 mm)
- Piston stroke: 3.385 in (86.0 mm)
- Cylinder block material: Cast iron
- Cylinder head material: Cast iron
- Valvetrain: Overhead valve 2 valves x cyl.
- Compression ratio: 22.5:1, 21.6:1

Combustion
- Fuel system: Indirect injection
- Fuel type: Diesel
- Oil system: Wet sump
- Cooling system: Water-cooled

Output
- Power output: 85–120 bhp (63–89 kW)
- Torque output: 160–220 lb⋅ft (217–298 N⋅m)

Chronology
- Successor: Detroit Diesel V8 engine

The Oldsmobile Diesel engine is a series of V6 and V8 diesel engines produced by General Motors from 1978 to 1985. Their design was based on the Olds 350 gasoline engine architecture. A 350 cu in (5.7 L) V8 was introduced in 1978, followed by a 261 cu in (4.3 L) V8 only for the 1979 model year. In 1982, a 263 cu in (4.3 L) V6 became available for both front-wheel drive and rear-wheel drive vehicles.

Sales peaked in 1981 at approximately 310,000 units, which represented 60% of the total U.S. passenger vehicle diesel market. This success was short-lived as the V8 version suffered severe reliability issues. Although GM carried out several redesigns, by the time the engine was trouble-free, the damage to its reputation had been done, and it was discontinued after the 1985 model year. The later design V6 diesel did not have the problems of the V8.

The shortcomings of the engine, and the publicity around it, negatively affected American light diesel engine sales for years to come.

The 5.7L Oldsmobile V8 is often confused with and tarnishes the reputation of its immediate successor, the reliable and economical 6.2L Detroit Diesel V8 engine, put into numerous GMC C/K light truck and G van applications from 1982 to the early 90's, and also the military HMMWV.

== Design ==
While designing the original 350 cu in diesel, Oldsmobile left the head bolt design and pattern unchanged to enable them to use the same tooling as for the gasoline engines, unlike a proper gasoline to diesel conversion. This led to catastrophic head bolt failures as diesel engines have compression ratios that are as much as three times higher than a gasoline engine.

In addition to the head bolt issues, General Motors also decided not to install a water separator in order to cut costs. Low quality diesel fuel was a common problem at the time and most diesels were thus equipped to keep the injector pumps from corroding. Many owners tried to solve this by adding anhydrous alcohol, a common trick to deal with water in fuel, but this instead dissolved fuel pump seals and other parts.

The stretchy fuel-pump timing chain was a minor problem in light of the other issues. Poor dealer service training only made all the problems worse.

General Motors also carried out several redesigns of the V8's heads, bolts, and various other parts, but by the time the engine was trouble-free the reputation damage had already been done. The upgraded engines, as built by model year 1981, were identified as "350 DX" on the block.

=== Problems ===
One Oldsmobile engineer who had worked on the V8 diesel told his GM bosses not to release the hastily developed engine. Needing to meet upcoming CAFE standards, GM forced him into early retirement and released the unfinished engine nonetheless.

Simultaneous problems with GM's new THM200 automatic transmission made the overall problem worse. The California Air Resources Board (CARB) had been unable to certify the diesel V8 for sale in the state in 1979 and early 1980 as the test cars issued to CARB broke down before the tests could be completed. Of the nine cars supplied to CARB, all suffered engine problems and seven had transmission failures.

Myriad lawsuits were filed as several grassroots groups formed to try to get General Motors to acknowledge the issues. In 1980 the Federal Trade Commission filed a complaint that included the diesel engine issues and the transmission troubles, as well as camshaft issues with gasoline V8s. General Motors kept marketing the diesel to the fullest, with 19 of the 23 Oldsmobile models in 1981 being available with the 5.7 L diesel.

The sales and reliability woes were compounded by a decline in gas prices as well as poor fuel quality issues, including large volumes of diesel fuel containing water or foreign particles.

A class action lawsuit eventually forced General Motors to pay up to 80 percent of the costs of new engines. A large number of cars simply had their broken diesels replaced with conventional gasoline engines. Used car price guides have always indicated much lower prices for diesel-engined cars and they remain undesirable in the collector's market.

The 4.3 L diesel released in 1982 did not have the same problems as the V8, as it has a denser bolt pattern and Oldsmobile's engineers were given more time to develop and test it.

Nonetheless, Oldsmobile diesel's reputation for unreliability and anemic performance damaged the North American passenger diesel market for the next 30 years.

== V8 ==
V8 engines by RPO code included:

=== LF9 ===
The LF9 is a 350 cu in (5.7 L) diesel V8 produced from 1978 to 1985. From 1978 through 1980, the engine featured the original "D" block casting and produced 120 hp (89 kW) at 3,600 rpm and 220 lb⋅ft (298 N⋅m) of torque at 1,900 rpm. For the 1981 model year, General Motors introduced the heavily reinforced "DX" block; while light-duty pickup trucks and vans maintained the 120 hp rating for its final year in those applications, passenger car variants were detuned via revised injection pump calibration to produce 105 hp (78 kW) at 3,200 rpm and 205 lb⋅ft (278 N⋅m) of torque at 1,600 rpm to improve fuel economy and lower peak cylinder pressures. Maximum engine speed across all years was governed between 4,200 and 4,400 rpm.

Applications:

- 1981 Buick Century
- 1980–1984 Buick Electra
- 1980–1985 Buick LeSabre
- 1981–1985 Buick Regal
- 1981–1985 Buick Riviera
- 1979–1984 Cadillac de Ville
- 1979–1985 Cadillac Eldorado
- 1979–1985 Cadillac Fleetwood Brougham
- 1978–1985 Cadillac Seville
- 1980–1982 Checker Marathon
- 1981–1985 Chevrolet Caprice
- 1982–1984 Chevrolet El Camino
- 1981–1985 Chevrolet Impala
- 1982–1983 Chevrolet Malibu
- 1982–1984 Chevrolet Monte Carlo
- 1978–1981 Chevrolet C10 pickup (2WD, Automatic only)
- 1978–1981 GMC C1500 pickup (2WD, Automatic only)
- 1982–1984 GMC Caballero
- 1978–1985 Oldsmobile Custom Cruiser
- 1978–1983 Oldsmobile Cutlass Cruiser
- 1978–1980 Oldsmobile Cutlass Salon
- 1978–1985 Oldsmobile Cutlass Supreme/Cutlass Calais
- 1978–1985 Oldsmobile Delta 88
- 1978–1984 Oldsmobile Ninety-Eight
- 1979–1985 Oldsmobile Toronado
- 1980–1984 Pontiac Bonneville
- 1980–1981 Pontiac Catalina
- 1981–1984 Pontiac Grand Prix
- 1981–1985 Pontiac Parisienne

=== LF7 ===
The short-lived LF7 is a 260 cu in (4.3 L) V8 putting out 90 hp (67 kW) and 160 lb⋅ft (217 N⋅m) torque.

Applications:

- 1979 Oldsmobile Cutlass Salon
- 1979 Oldsmobile Cutlass Supreme/Cutlass Calais

== V6 ==
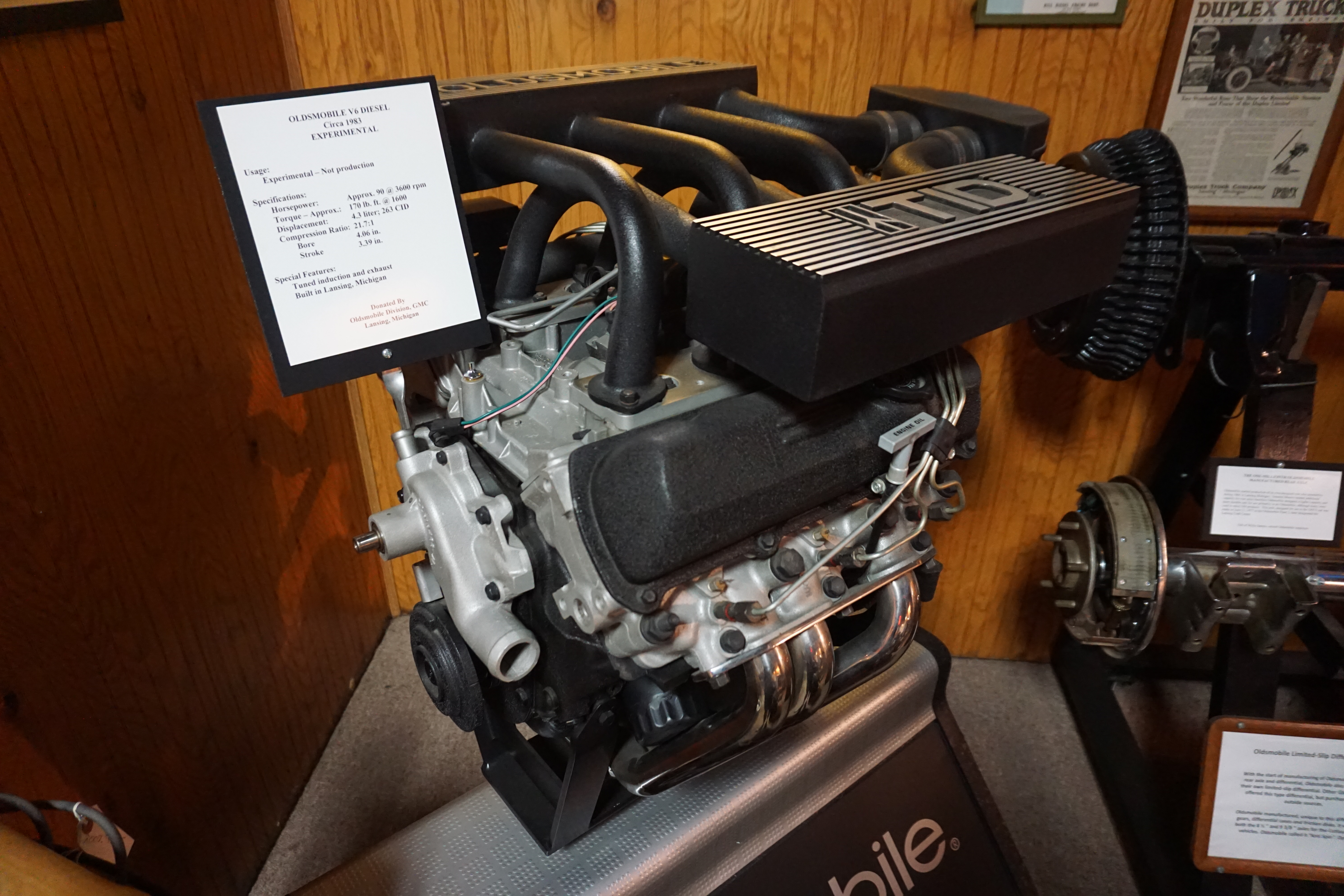
1983 V6 experimental at the RE Olds Transportation Museum

In 1982, GM introduced a 4.3-liter V6 for longitudinal and transverse applications. All versions of the engine were rated at 85 bhp (63 kW) at 3600 rpm and 165 lb⋅ft (224 N⋅m) at 1600 rpm. It did not have the same problems as the V8, as it has a denser bolt pattern and Oldsmobile's engineers were given more time to develop and test it.

Engines by RPO code included:

=== LT6 ===
The LT6 was produced from 1982 to 1984 and installed in rear-wheel drive vehicles.

Applications:

- 1982–1984 Buick Regal
- 1982–1983 Chevrolet Malibu
- 1982–1983 Chevrolet Monte Carlo
- 1982–1984 Oldsmobile Cutlass Supreme/Cutlass Calais

=== LT7 ===
The LT7 is a transverse engine version produced from 1982 to 1985.

Applications:

- 1982–1985 Buick Century
- 1982–1985 Chevrolet Celebrity
- 1982–1985 Oldsmobile Cutlass Ciera
- 1982–1985 Pontiac 6000

=== LS2 ===
The LS2 was produced only in 1985 and installed in front-wheel drive vehicles.

Applications:

- 1985 Buick Electra
- 1985 Cadillac de Ville
- 1985 Cadillac Fleetwood
- 1985 Oldsmobile Ninety-Eight

== Discontinuation ==
While customer complaints started dropping off after 1981, sales did too: diesels sold 43 percent less in 1982. The downward sales slide continued, not helped by stricter emissions standards - for the 1984 model year the diesel V8 was no longer offered in California for that very reason.

General Motors had built a whole new plant for the V6 diesel, but sales thereof never broke 30,000 annually. Production ran at less than ten percent of capacity and much of the tooling had never even been unpacked by the time it was discontinued.

In December 1984, General Motors announced the Oldsmobile Diesel engines would be discontinued during the 1985 model year. GM continued to offer Isuzu's 4FB1 1.8-liter four cylinder diesel in the Chevrolet Chevette/Pontiac 1000, but after only 588 of these were sold in 1986, the company went on to abandon the diesel passenger car segment entirely for many decades.

Although the engines were unreliable because of the head and problems with the ancillaries, the Oldsmobile diesels' strong blocks continue to see use in gasoline-powered race engines.
