= Turbo-Hydramatic 125 =

Turbo-Hydramatic Transverse Transaxle Series
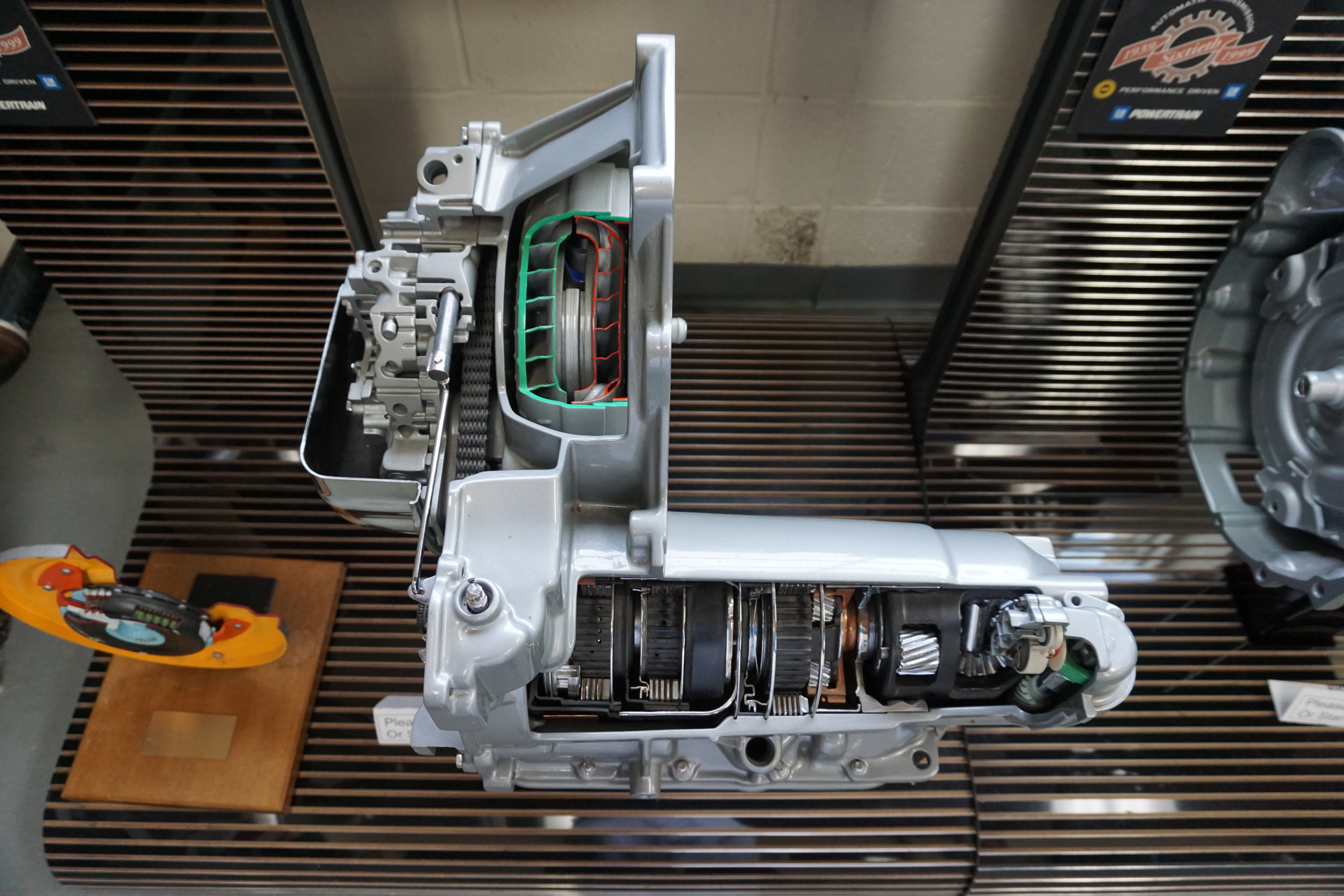
- A Hydra-Matic 3T40 transmission, produced between 1979 and 2001, at the Ypsilanti Automotive Heritage Museum

Overview
- Manufacturer: General Motors
- Production: 1979–2001

Body and chassis
- Class: 3-speed transverse automatic transmission
- Related: Turbo-Hydramatic

Chronology
- Successor: 4T40-E/4T45-E; 4T60-E/4T65-E; 4T80-E

The Turbo-Hydramatic 125 (modern designation 3T40) was the first in a line of automatic transmissions from General Motors designed for transverse engine application. Introduced in 1980 in the X-body and T-body (FWD) platform vehicles the units were used across all of GMs divisions worldwide, and was augmented by later automatic four speed transaxles, starting with the 44T-4 (4T60) which bore no internal functional resemblance to the original design 3 speed transaxle other than its basic chain driven 180-degree rotated version of its longitudinally mounted Stromberg THM 180 incarnation.

== Turbo-Hydramatic 125 ==
The 3-speed Turbo-Hydramatic 125 was introduced in 1980 and produced through 2001. It carried over some parts from the light-duty Turbo-Hydramatic 200 and 350, but was generally a new design. The 125 was renamed 3T40 later, following GM's new naming convention. After the 1995 introduction of the electronically controlled 4T40-E 4-speed, the 3T40 was gradually phased out.

Applications:

- 1982–1996 A-body
- 1980–1985 X-body
- 1982–2001 J-body
- 1990-1993 W-body
- 1987–1996 L body
- 1980-1991 T-body (FWD)/T80
- 1990–1995 U-body vans (with LG6 engine)
- 1984-1988 Pontiac Fiero

== Turbo-Hydramatic 125 C ==
This was a later model of the 125 that debuted for 1982 and included a torque converter clutch or TCC. The TCC acts similar to a clutch in a manual transmission vehicle, in that at speeds above 35 MPH a combination of engine vacuum- and temperature-sensing valves, and a dedicated brake switch - and in later models an ECU - activated a solenoid which engaged a clutch physically locking the impeller and turbine inside the torque converter together causing engine power to be transferred directly to the transaxle. The C in Turbo-Hydramatic 125 C denoted the use of a TCC. The solenoid that controls this is notorious for failure due to overheated plastic componentry, and problems indicated by an engine stall when stopping from speeds greater than 45 MPH. This occurs because the clutch does not disengage, and as the affected vehicle's speed nears zero miles per hour, the engine is forced to decelerate to zero rpm.

== Turbo-Hydramatic 125 C AWD ==
For the 1988 model year, the Pontiac Division of GM utilized a THM 125C modified to accommodate a full-time All-Wheel-Drive planetary gear transfer case and output housing to send 40% of the output torque to the rear wheels in the 3.1 liter powered 6000STE. While a similar design was used for the later 4T65E, the three speed design was utilized for only three model years, after which all-wheel drive was discontinued as an option for the car line.

== Turbo-Hydramatic 440-T4 ==
The model THM440T4 indicates Turbo HydraMatic Model 440, Transversely Mounted, 4 Speed Fully Automatic transaxle (complete new design as an in-place upgrade from THM 125/125C).

A 4-speed transaxle which replaced the 125, was created for the 1985–1986 GM C platform (FWD)/GM H platform (FWD) cars, the Turbo-Hydramatic 440-T4. Virtually no internal parts were shared with the 125, and overdrive was achieved by departing radically from the standard single Simpson compound planetary gearset's common sungear layout. This transaxle was first used in GM's 1985 Buick Park Avenue, Oldsmobile 98, and Cadillac Deville. In 1986, after switching to FWD, the Buick LeSabre, Oldsmobile Delta 88, and later, the Pontiac Bonneville also used this transaxle. The 440-T4 was later renamed the 4T60 under GM's new transmission naming convention. A version of the 4T60 called the 4T60-HD, which incorporated upgraded final drive hardware but was otherwise mechanically indistinguishable from standard units, was used in the 1989-1990 Pontiac Grand Prix with the turbocharged engine. GM started adding electronic controls to the 4T60 in 1990 with the Cadillac Allanté carline's unique F7, and 1991 and after with the corporate 4T60-E.

One unique feature of this transmission is its use of both a modulator valve and a throttle valve (TV) cable. Most transmissions either use one or the other to control shift points and shift smoothness. On the Turbo 440-T4, the TV cable exclusively controls the shift points, while the modulator valve controls the shift feel, with very little overlap between the effects of one adjustment on the other. This feature makes it very easy for a do-it-yourself mechanic to adjust the transmission shift points with minimum effect on the shift feel.

The 440-T4 was originally slated to be used with downsized C-Body cars for 1984. However, issues with failures due to lack of fluid lubrication to critical clutch train parts in the relatively complex and compact design, led to the introduction of transverse FWD 4-speed automatics being delayed as an option until 1984 for the 1985 model year.

Applications:

- 4T60
  - 1988-1993 W-Body
  - 1986-1993 H-Body
  - 1985-1993 C-Body
  - 1984-1993 A-body
  - 1988-1990 Buick Riviera
  - 1988-1990 Buick Reatta
- 4T60-HD
  - 1989-1990 Pontiac Grand Prix (Turbo Only)
- F-7
  - 1987–1992 Cadillac Allanté

== See also ==
- List of GM transmissions
