= Pontiac 6000 =

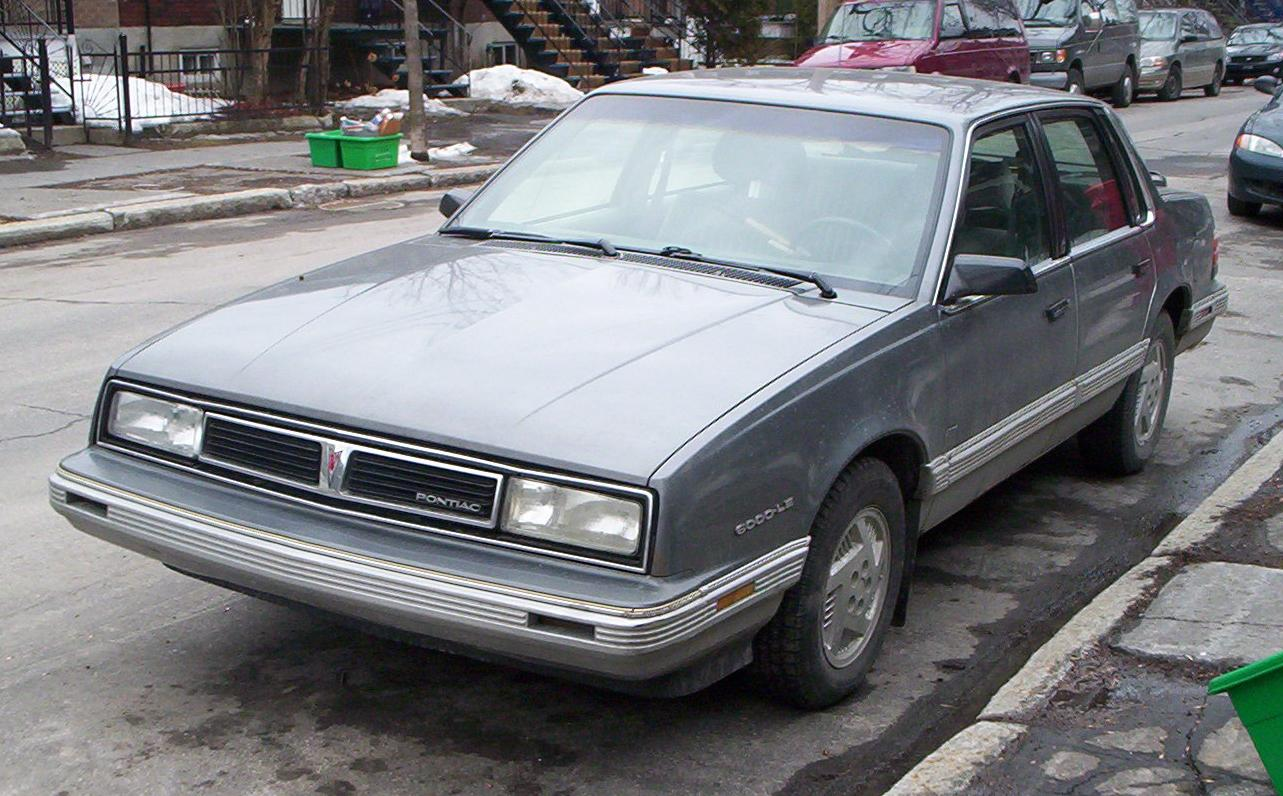
- 1987–1988 Pontiac 6000 LE

Overview
- Manufacturer: Pontiac (General Motors)
- Production: 1981–1991
- Model years: 1982–1991
- Assembly: Oklahoma City, Oklahoma, United States (1988–1991); Framingham, Massachusetts, United States (1982); North Tarrytown, New York, United States (1985–1989); Oshawa, Ontario, Canada (1982–1988)

Body and chassis
- Class: Mid-size
- Body style: 2-door coupe 4-door sedan 4-door station wagon
- Layout: Transverse front-engine, front-wheel drive / all-wheel drive
- Platform: A-body
- Related: Buick Century (fifth generation); Chevrolet Celebrity; Oldsmobile Cutlass Ciera

Powertrain
- Engine: 2.5 L LR8 I4; 2.8 L LE2/LH7/L44/LB6 V6; 3.1 L LH0 V6; 4.3 L LT7 diesel V6
- Transmission: 3-speed 3T40 automatic 4-speed 4T60 automatic 5-speed Getrag manual

Dimensions
- Wheelbase: 104.5 in (2,654 mm) (1982–1988); 104.9 in (2,664 mm) (1989–1991)
- Length: 188.9 in (4,798 mm); 193.2 in (4,907 mm) (wagon)
- Width: 72 in (1,829 mm)
- Height: 53.7 in (1,364 mm); 54.1 in (1,374 mm) (wagon)

Chronology
- Predecessor: Pontiac LeMans
- Successor: Pontiac Grand Prix

The Pontiac 6000 is a mid-size car that was sold by Pontiac from the 1982 to 1991 model years. As Pontiac downsized its mid-size model range, the 6000 was the successor of the Pontiac LeMans (which continued production as a downsized Pontiac Bonneville). Initially offered as a two-door and four-door notchback sedan, a five-door 6000 station wagon was introduced for 1984. During the 1980s, Pontiac was transitioning towards a numeric model nomenclature, with the 6000 ultimately becoming the largest model line to use it.

The 6000 used the front-wheel drive GM A platform. Sharing a platform with the Buick Century, Chevrolet Celebrity (replacing the Malibu), and Oldsmobile Cutlass Ciera (replacing the Cutlass sedan), the 6000 shared its roofline with the Cutlass Ciera. Introduced for 1983, the 6000 STE was a sport-tuned version of the four-door sedan, which was named to the Car and Driver 10Best List from 1983 to 1985. For 1987, the 6000 Safari wagon was introduced, denoting versions with woodgrain trim.

For 1984, the 6000 became the highest-selling Pontiac line (with over 122,000 sold). As part of their legacy, together the 6000 and the other A-bodies became popular — as well as synonymous with GM's most transparent examples of model rebadging. The latter was highlighted on the August 22, 1983 cover of Fortune magazine as examples of genericized uniformity, embarrassing the company and ultimately prompting GM to recommit to design leadership.

The 6000 was manufactured by GM Canada at Oshawa Car Assembly (Oshawa, Ontario) from 1981 to 1988; subsequently, it was manufactured at Oklahoma City Assembly (Oklahoma City, Oklahoma). For 1992, the 6000 was discontinued as Pontiac fully phased in the Grand Prix four-door sedan (introduced in 1990); the 1991 6000 Safari (outliving its full-size namesake by two years) would become the final station wagon line ever produced by Pontiac.

== Year-to-year changes ==
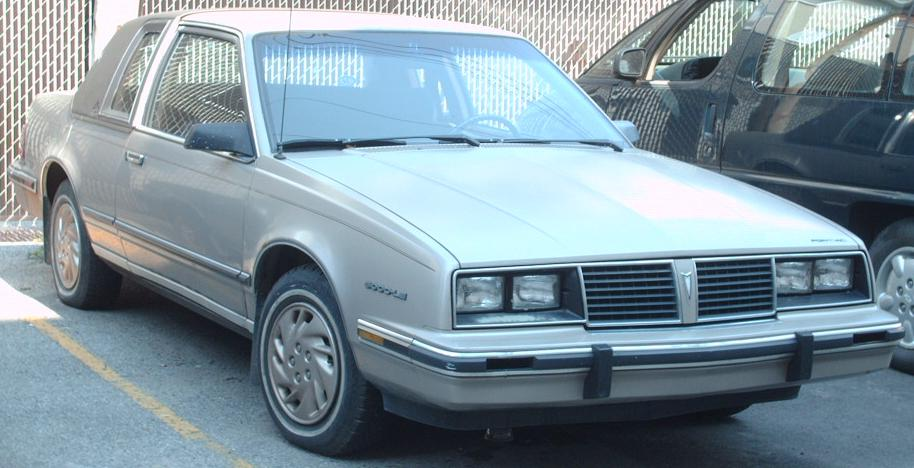
1984 Pontiac 6000 LE Coupé with Landau roof treatment option.

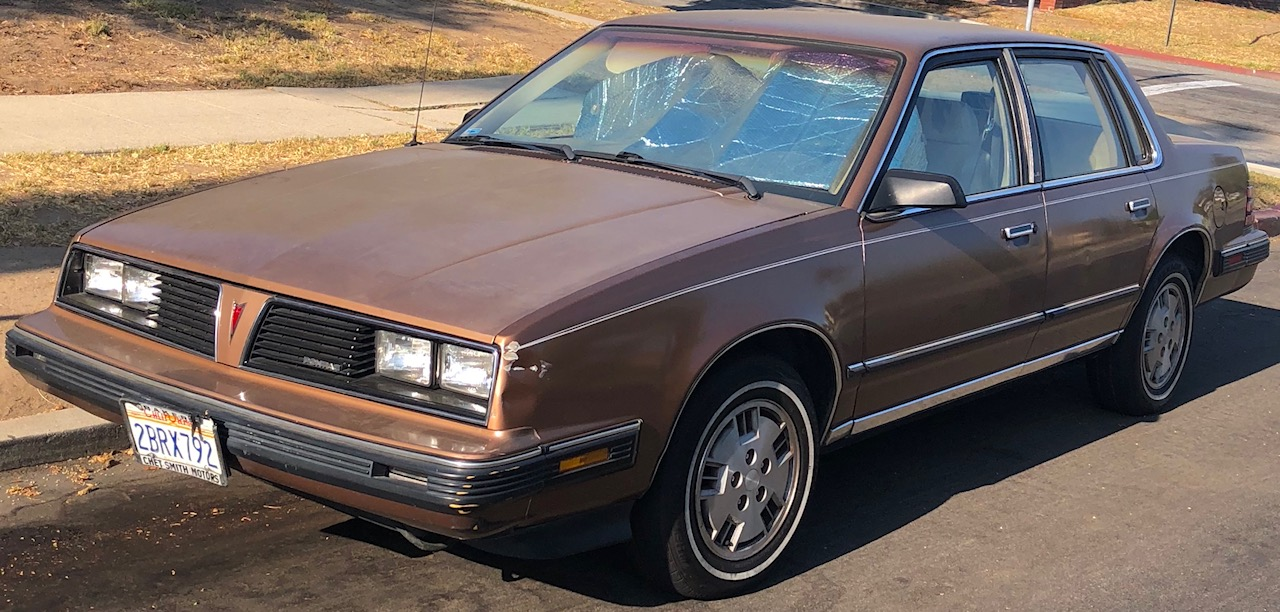
1986 Pontiac 6000 sedan

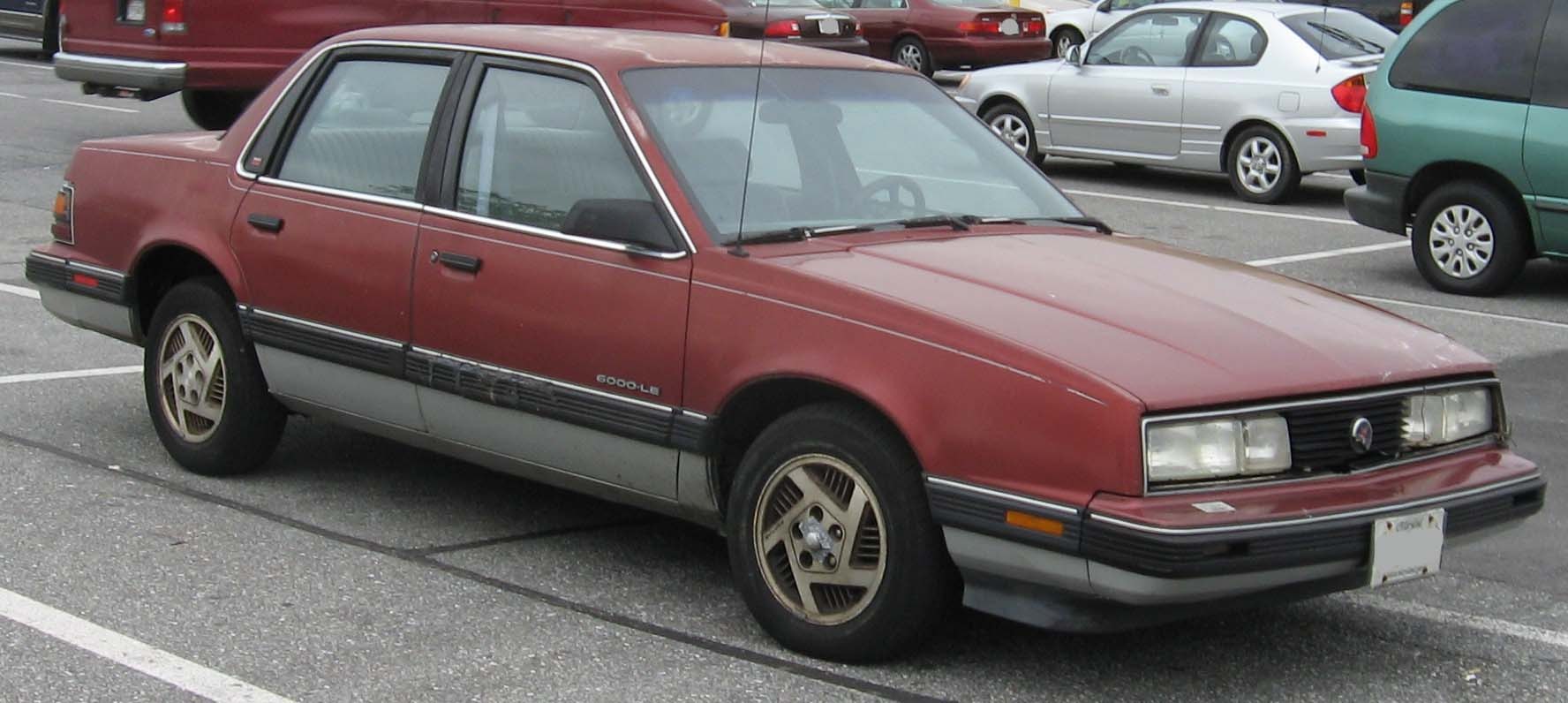
1989–1991 Pontiac 6000 LE sedan

- 1982: Two trim levels were offered: 6000 and 6000 LE. Both came standard with the new-for-1982 2.5 L (151 cu in) Tech IV four-cylinder with throttle body injection. It made 90 hp (67 kW). Optional engines were GM's 2.8 L (173 cu in) V6 with a 2-barrel carburetor which made 112 hp (84 kW), or a 4.3 L (263 cu in) Oldsmobile diesel V6 which made 85 hp (63 kW).
- 1984: A station wagon known as the 6000 Safari was introduced to replace the rear-wheel drive Bonneville Safari wagon.
- 1985: A facelift meant a new fascia with a body-colored center section housing the Pontiac logo. The 2.8 in the STE model was updated with multi-port fuel injection, raising output to 135 hp (101 kW). The Tech IV was given various updates over the years but was mostly unchanged. The 4.3-liter diesel V6 was unpopular in light of General Motors diesel engine problems and was discontinued after 1985.
- 1986: The fuel-injected 2.8 made its way into the Base and LE models for the 1986 model year, however in these trims, it only made 125 hp (93 kW). An S/E model arrived with the STE powertrain but with fewer features; it was also available as a station wagon.
- 1987: The quad rectangular sealed beam headlamps were replaced with composite units. The taillights were updated with separate amber-colored turn signal indicators on the outboard side.
- 1988: The coupe model was dropped; the rest of the line received equipment changes such as new "contour seats" for the LE.
- 1988: In Canada, an Olympic edition was offered on S/E models as a tie-in to the Calgary Winter Olympics. Offered only in monochrome white, with all blackout trim exterior painted white to match the body. The only interior colour trim was saddle, with an Olympic logo mounted on the B pillar.
- 1989: The 6000 received a more-rounded roofline, along with the Buick Century and Oldsmobile Cutlass Ciera, and was facelifted for the final time with slightly wider headlamps and a new grille. The taillights were replaced with the one from 6000STE.
- 1990: Passive front seatbelts were introduced and the 3.1 L (191 cu in) V6 originally only seen in the STE replaced the 2.8 across the board. After the STE model was dropped from the 6000 line for 1990, the S/E model gained its all wheel drive option. This was later dropped for the 1991 model year.
- 1991: The final year of the 6000, succeeded by the Grand Prix sedan. The 6000 wagon was the final mid-sized station wagon offering from Pontiac, as it was replaced by the Pontiac Trans Sport in 1990. The last Pontiac 6000 was assembled on July 22, 1991.

== STE version ==
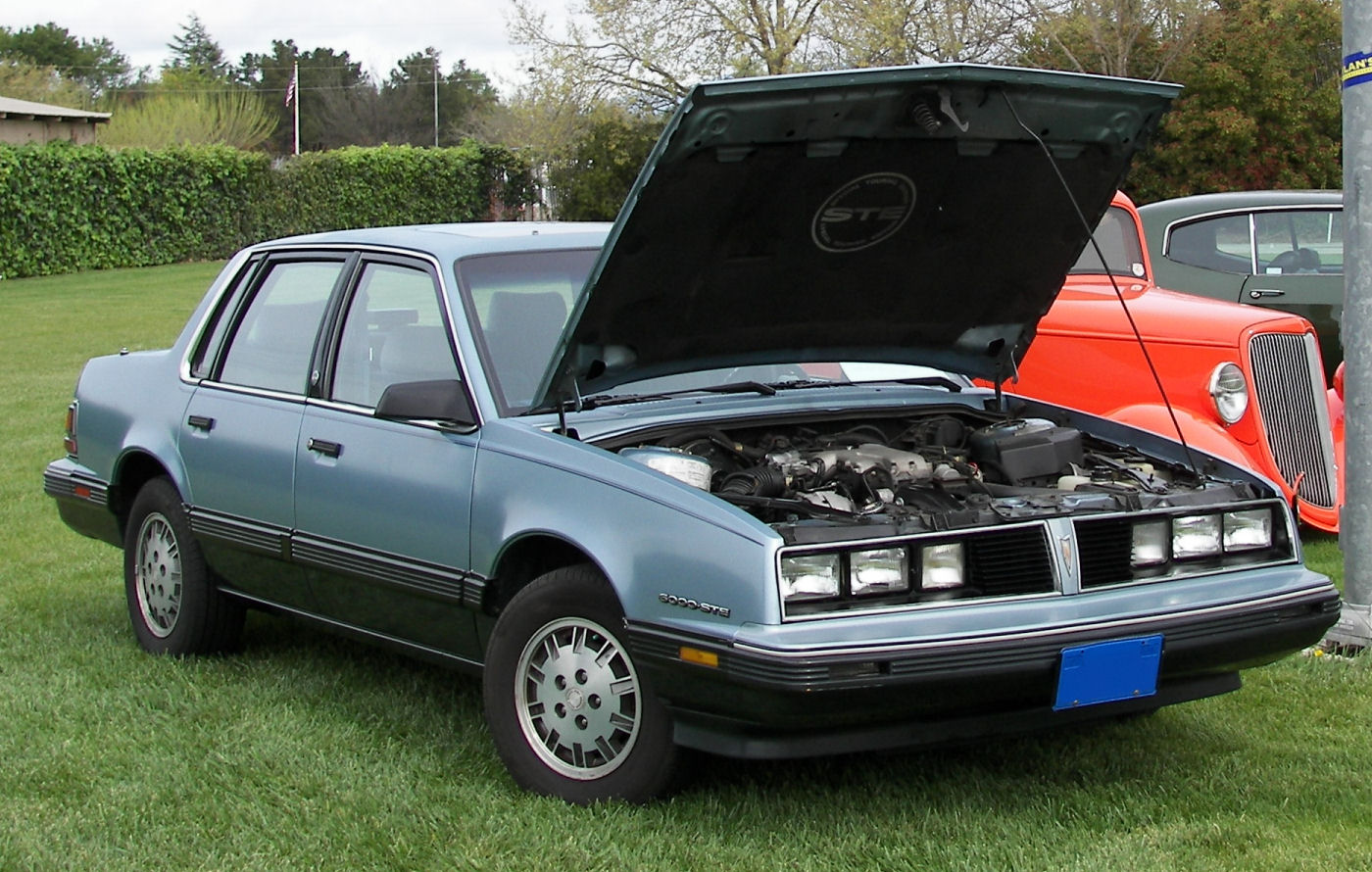
1985 Pontiac 6000 STE

By 1984, Pontiac was in the midst of a resurgence as the division began to reassert its 1960s role as GM's performance brand. The 6000STE (Special Touring Edition) was introduced for the 1983 model year. 5-passenger seating with front captain seats and power windows were standard on this trim level (optional on some other trim levels). It featured a High-Output version of the 6000's optional 2.8 L V6. Like that engine, it sported a 2-barrel carburetor, though it delivered 135 hp (101 kW), rather than the usual 112 horsepower. Although intended to compete with similar entries from BMW, Audi, Toyota and Nissan, the 6000 used older technologies by comparison. The fuel system was carbureted (competitors had fuel injection) and gauge cluster lacked a tachometer. The 1984 6000STE featured a digital gauge cluster featuring a bar-graph tachometer. The STE featured a driver information center with a system which monitored functions such as lights, doors, tune-ups and tire rotations. For 1984, Road & Track called the 6000 STE one of the top twelve enthusiast cars.

Special steering rack, and suspension tuning with a self-leveling rear air suspension yielded handling performance comparable to European vehicles. Four wheel disc brakes improved stopping as did standard Goodyear Eagle GT tires, size 195/70R14 (large for the time).

In 1985, the carbureted engine was replaced by a multi-port fuel injected version of the 2.8 L V6, still delivering 135 hp (101 kW). Although the 3-speed automatic remained standard (a Getrag 5-speed manual was a no charge option), the new engine accelerated faster than the previous engine.

For 1986, a revised front fascia with composite headlamps, anti-lock brakes, a revised tachometer, steering wheel mounted audio controls (the first of their kind) and a new 4-speed automatic transmission became available. Following this was a two-position memory seat for the 8-way power drivers seat for 1987. New for 1988 was an optional All Wheel Drive system. It was mated to a new 3.1 L LH0 V6 (the first use of GM's then-new Generation II 3.1 L in a production car) but only a 3-speed automatic transmission, which did not help acceleration or fuel economy. The all-wheel-drive system became standard for 1989, but was moved to the SE model for 1990, since the STE model name was discontinued from the 6000 line and moved to the new four-door Grand Prix lineup that year. The STE, while costing upwards of 75 percent more than the lowest-priced 6000, was surprisingly successful, sales representing 10 to 15 percent of overall 6000 sales throughout the production run. The STE trim level was later discontinued from the Grand Prix after 1993.

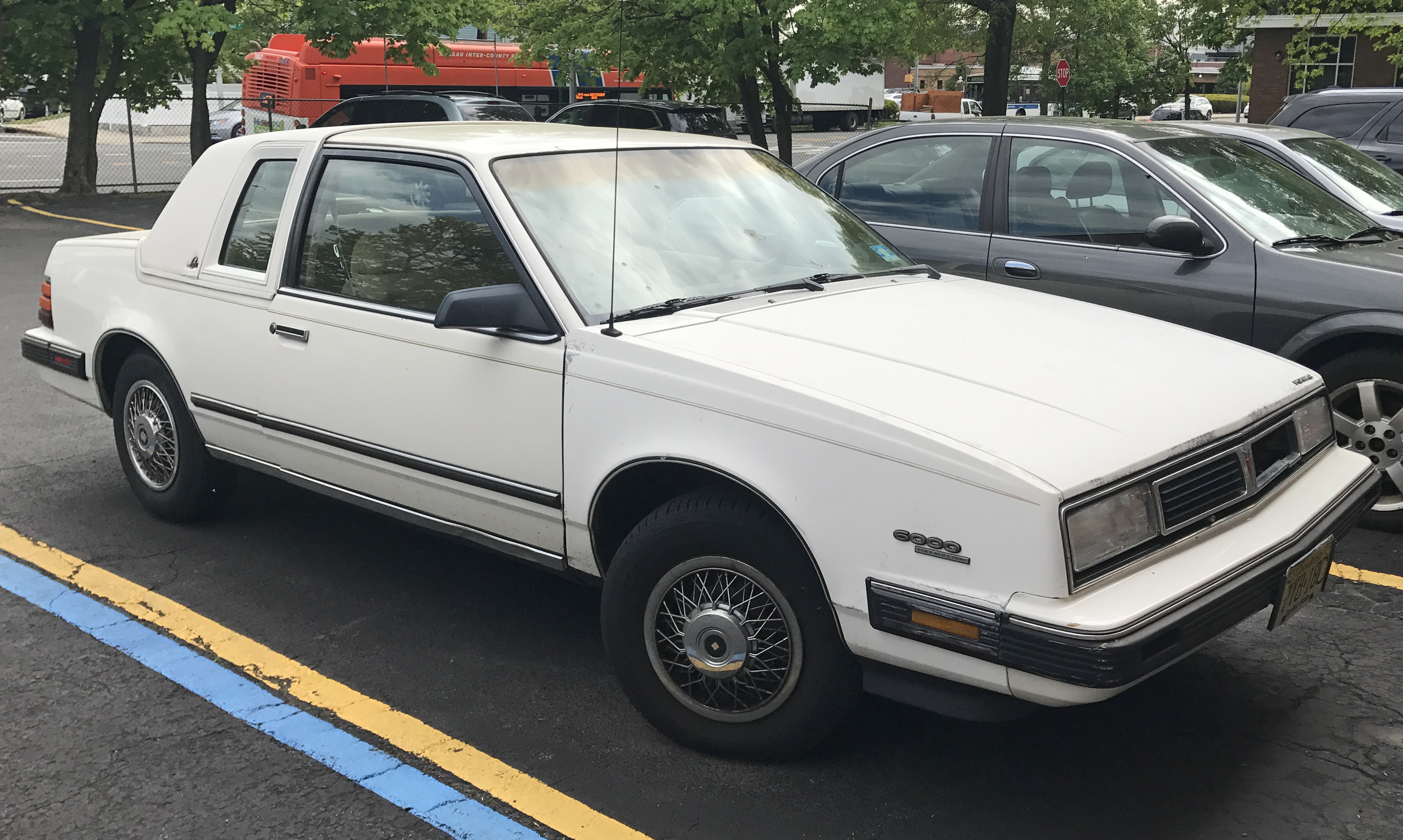
1987 Pontiac 6000 coupé with Landau roof option. This was the last year for this body style.

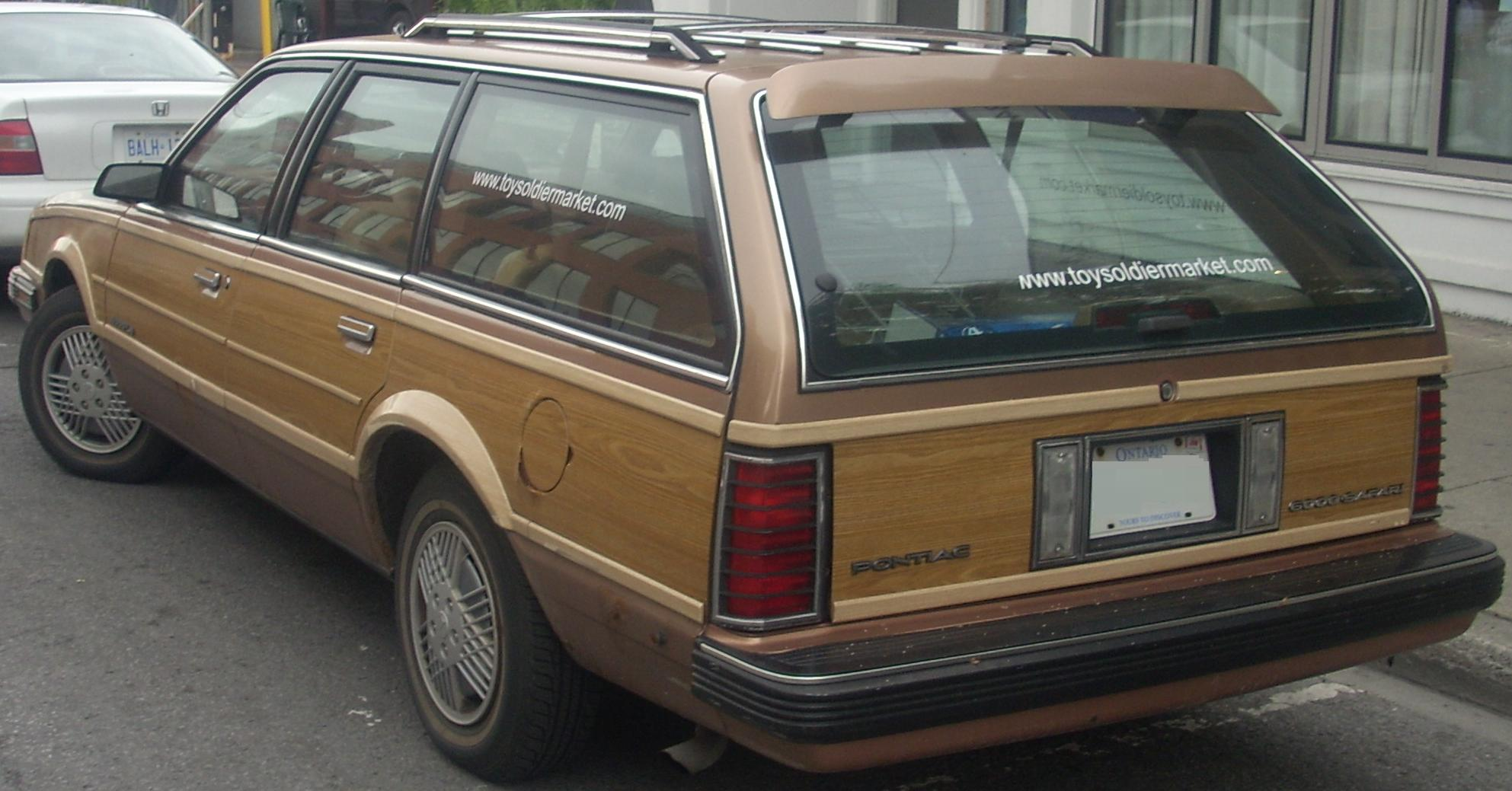
1989–1991 Pontiac 6000 Safari

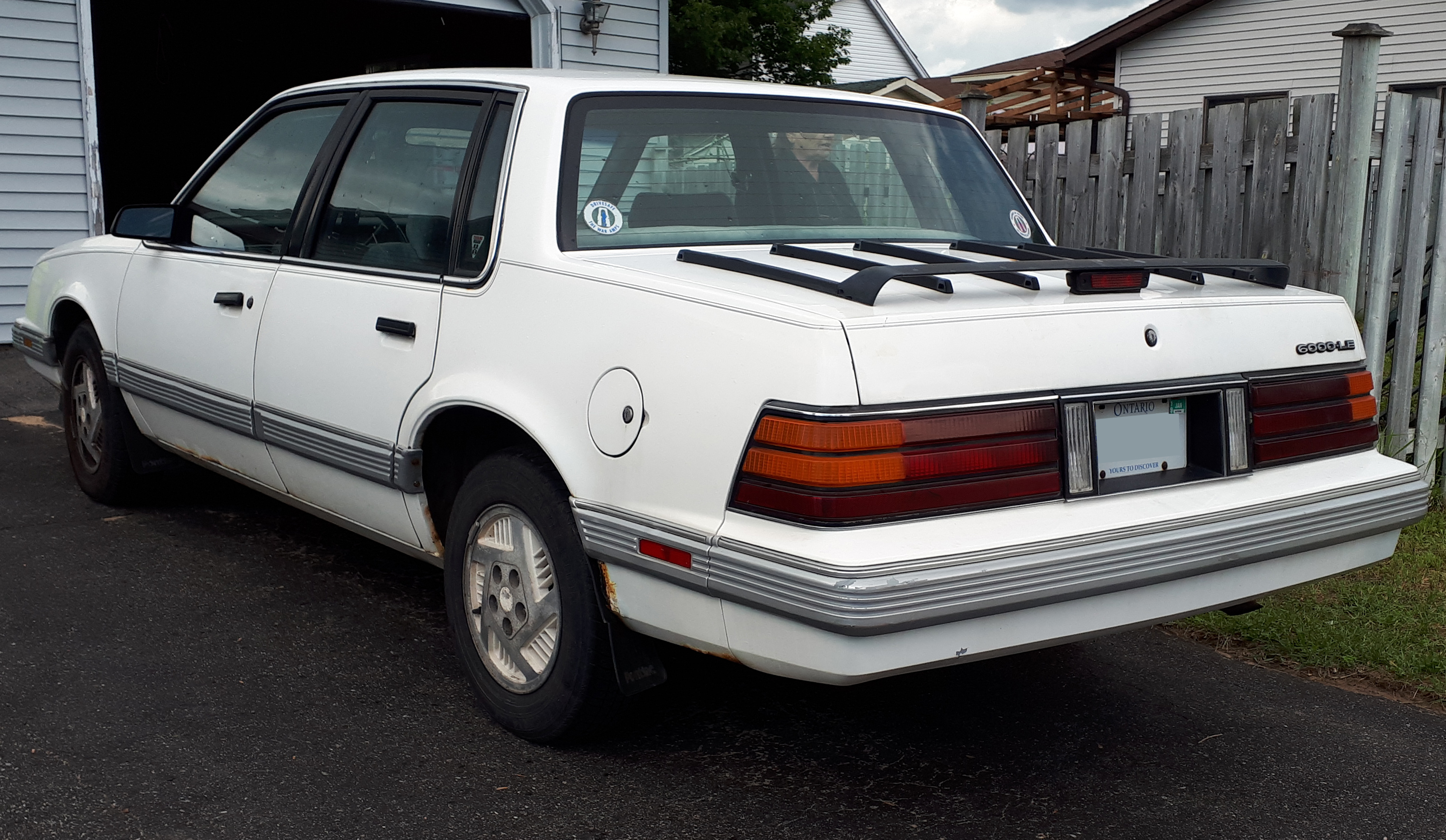
1988 Pontiac 6000 LE (rear view)

== Engines ==
Years	Engine	Power	Notes
1982–1991	2.5 L (151 cu in) LR8 TBI "Tech IV" I4	90 hp (67 kW)	
1982–1986	2.8 L (173 cu in) LE2 2-barrel V6	112 hp (84 kW)	
1982–1985	4.3 L (263 cu in) LT7 diesel V6	85 hp (63 kW)	
1983–1984	2.8 L (173 cu in) LH7 2-barrel V6	135 hp (101 kW)	STE
1985–1986	2.8 L (173 cu in) L44 MFI V6	140 hp (104 kW)	STE
1987–1989	2.8 L (173 cu in) LB6 MFI V6	130 hp (97 kW)	
1988–1989	3.1 L (191 cu in) LH0 MFI V6	135 hp (101 kW)	STE AWD
1990–1991	3.1 L (191 cu in) LH0 MFI V6	135 hp (101 kW)	

== Transmissions ==
- 1984–1986 Muncie 4-speed manual w/overdrive (only available on 2.5 L 4-cyl & 4.3 L diesel)
- 1984–1988 Muncie/Getrag 5T40/HM282 5-speed manual w/overdrive (only on 2.8 L V6)
- 1982–1991 Turbo Hydramatic 125C/3T40 3-speed automatic (Standard on all engines)
- 1985–1991 Turbo Hydramatic 440-T4/4T60 4-speed automatic with overdrive (optional only on V6 engines)
