= Buick GL8 =

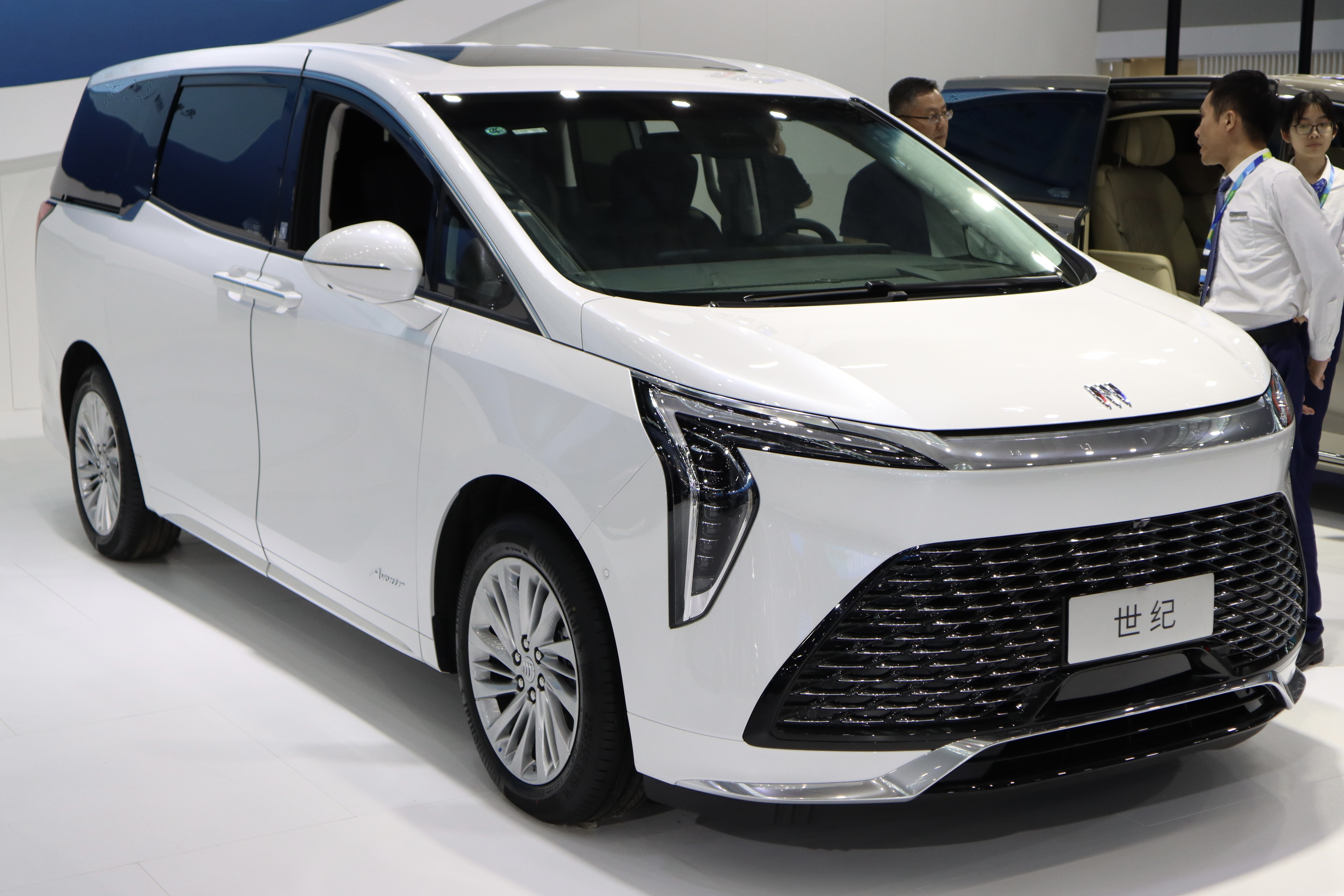
- 2023 Buick Century

Overview
- Manufacturer: SAIC-GM
- Production: 1999–present

Body and chassis
- Class: Minivan
- Layout: Transverse front-engine, front-wheel drive/all-wheel drive
- Platform: GM U platform

The Buick GL8 (Chinese: 别克GL8; pinyin: Biékè GL8) is a minivan that is produced by SAIC-GM, a joint-venture between Chinese automaker SAIC Motor and American automaker General Motors. It is only sold in China.

Introduced in 1999, the first generation Buick GL8 is similar to the GM-made minivans that are sold in North America which was marketed under many nameplates. Like the North American GM minivans, it is built on GM's U-body platform, which is also used by the Buick Rendezvous and the Pontiac Aztek crossover SUVs.

A revamped edition was released in late 2010/early 2011, featuring 2.4 L and V6 3.0 L engines. It is based on an old minivan platform, with a completely reworked exterior and interior design. The previous generation was available as the GL8 First Land until 2016.

The third-generation model dubbed the GL8 ES and Avenir was launched in 2017, with the second generation still available and updated as the GL8 Legacy. Both the third generation GL8 and GL8 Legacy received a facelift with the third generation GL8 receiving an Avenir luxury variant.

The fourth-generation is marketed simply as Century was launched in 2022, with the GL8 Legacy (second generation) and GL8 ES and Avenir (third generation) models both available and updated to be sold alongside the Century, resulting in a 3-generation lineup with the latter two generations both available with an Avenir luxury trim level.

== GL8 / GL8 2.5 / GL8 First Land ==
GL8 / GL8 2.5 / GL8 First Land
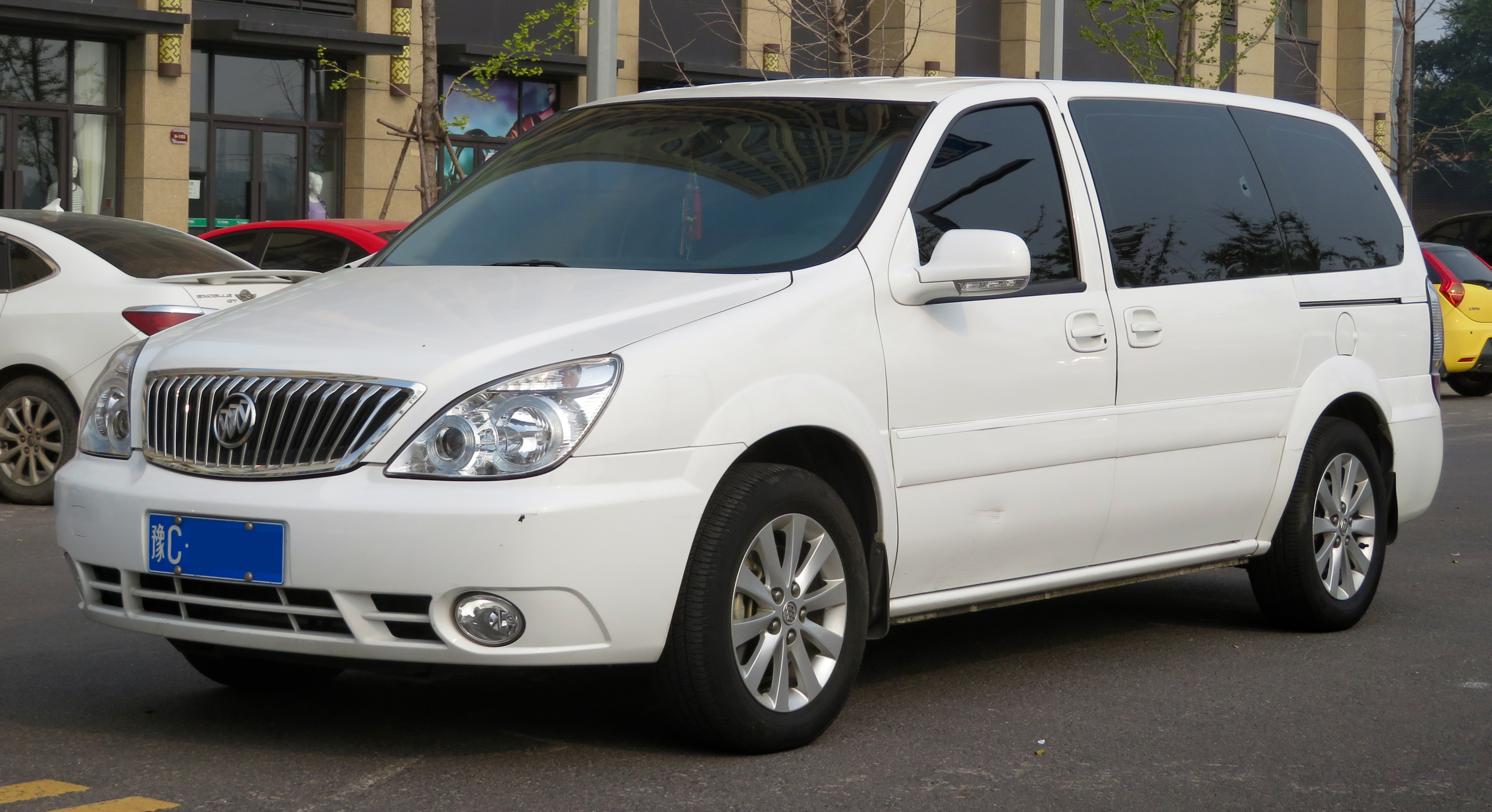
- Buick GL8 (second facelift)

Overview
- Also called: Chevrolet Venture (Philippines; 2001–2006)
- Production: 1999–2016 (GL8); 2005–2010 (GL8 First Land)
- Assembly: Shanghai, China (SAIC-GM; 1999-2004); Shenyang, Liaoning, China (SAIC-GM Norsom Motors; 2004-2016)
- Designer: James C. Shyr (2005; GL8 First Land)

Body and chassis
- Body style: 5-door minivan
- Platform: GMT200 platform (2000–2010); GMT201 platform (2005–2016)
- Related: Chevrolet Venture; Oldsmobile Silhouette; Pontiac Montana; Pontiac Trans Sport; Opel/Vauxhall Sintra

Powertrain
- Engine: 2.4 L LE5 I4; 2.5 L LB8 V6; 3.0 L LW9 V6
- Transmission: 4-speed automatic 6-speed automatic

Dimensions
- Wheelbase: 2,845 mm (112 in) (2.5); 3,099 mm (122 in) (First Land)
- Length: 4,757 mm (187.3 in) (2.5); 5,113 mm (201.3 in) (First Land)
- Width: 1,847 mm (72.7 in)
- Height: 1,712 mm (67.4 in) (2.5); 1,730 mm (68.1 in) (First Land)
- Curb weight: 1,692 kg (3,730 lb) (2.5); 1,788 kg (3,942 lb) (First Land)

The GL8 first entered production in China in December 1999. There are five trim levels available, called the LT, CT1, CT2, CT3 and GT (which is only available on the First Land). The regular wheelbase GL8 is known as the GL8 2.5, while the extended wheelbase variant of the GL8 is known as the GL8 First Land (Chinese: GL8陆尊). Pricing ranged between 218,000 and 318,000 yuan (US$31,920 to US$46,570).

Starting from October 2001, the GL8 was exported to the Philippines, where it was rebadged as the Chevrolet Venture and available in a 10-seater configuration until 2005. Although reviews and sales were generally lukewarm, build quality was subpar and parts availability was also a source of persistent frustration for Venture owners in the Philippines. Its local competitors include the Hyundai Starex and the Kia Carnival which had better build quality. The Chevrolet Venture was sold in the Philippine market up until 2006, although some remaining units were sold in dealerships up until 2007.

The Venture is one out of two rebadged Chinese-market Buicks sold in the Philippines, the other being the Buick Regal-based Chevrolet Lumina. Both are sourced from Shanghai GM.

Pre-facelift styling

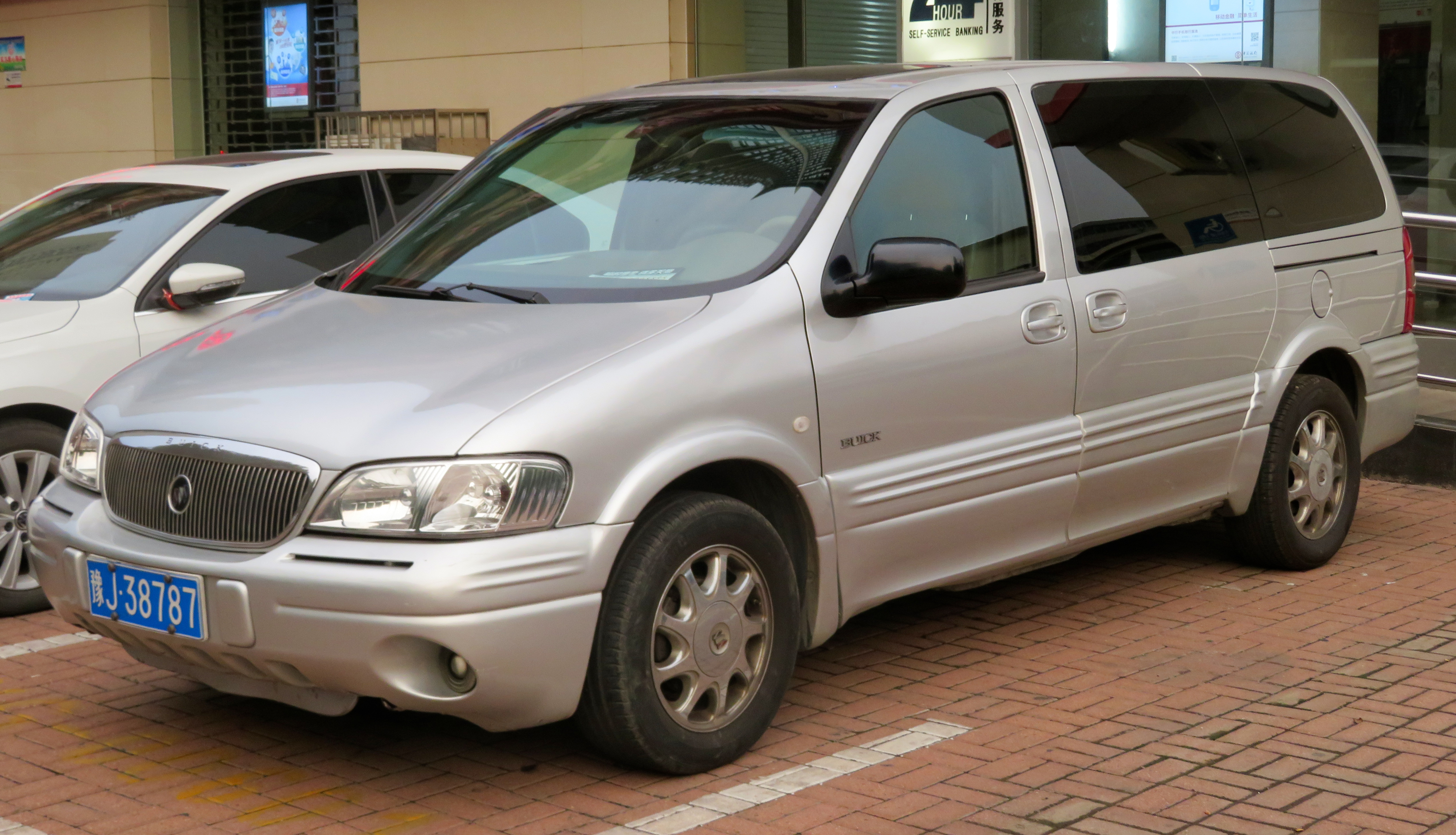
Buick GL8 (1999–2005) front.

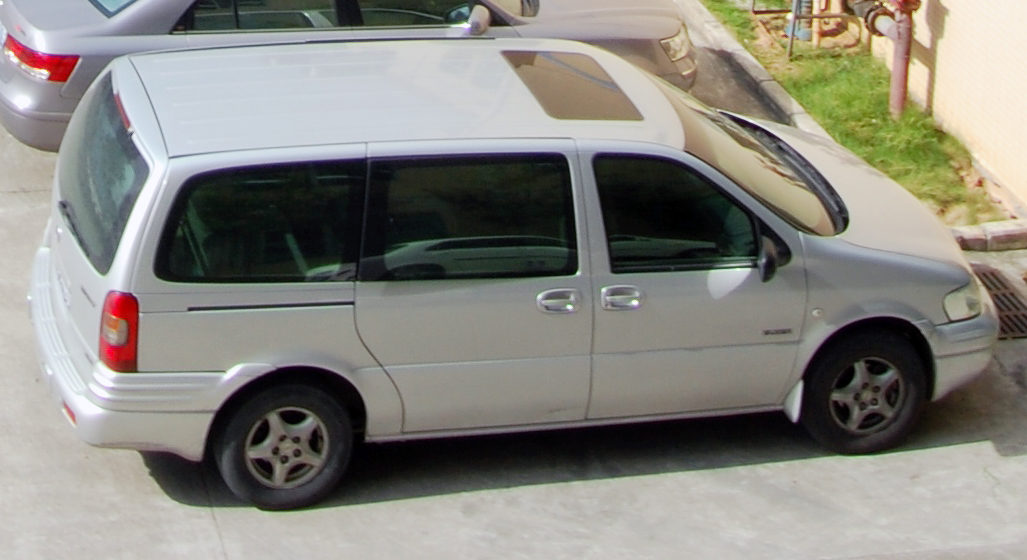
Buick GL8 (1999–2005) rear.

In 2005, the GL8 underwent a facelift for the 2006 model year, receiving a redesigned front end and simplified cladding. The GL8 First Land was also introduced, with a brand-new front end design and clear taillights. The GL8 was then given a second facelift for the 2010 model year with a design similar to the GL8 First Land.

Production of the first generation GL8 ended in 2016.

Post-facelift styling

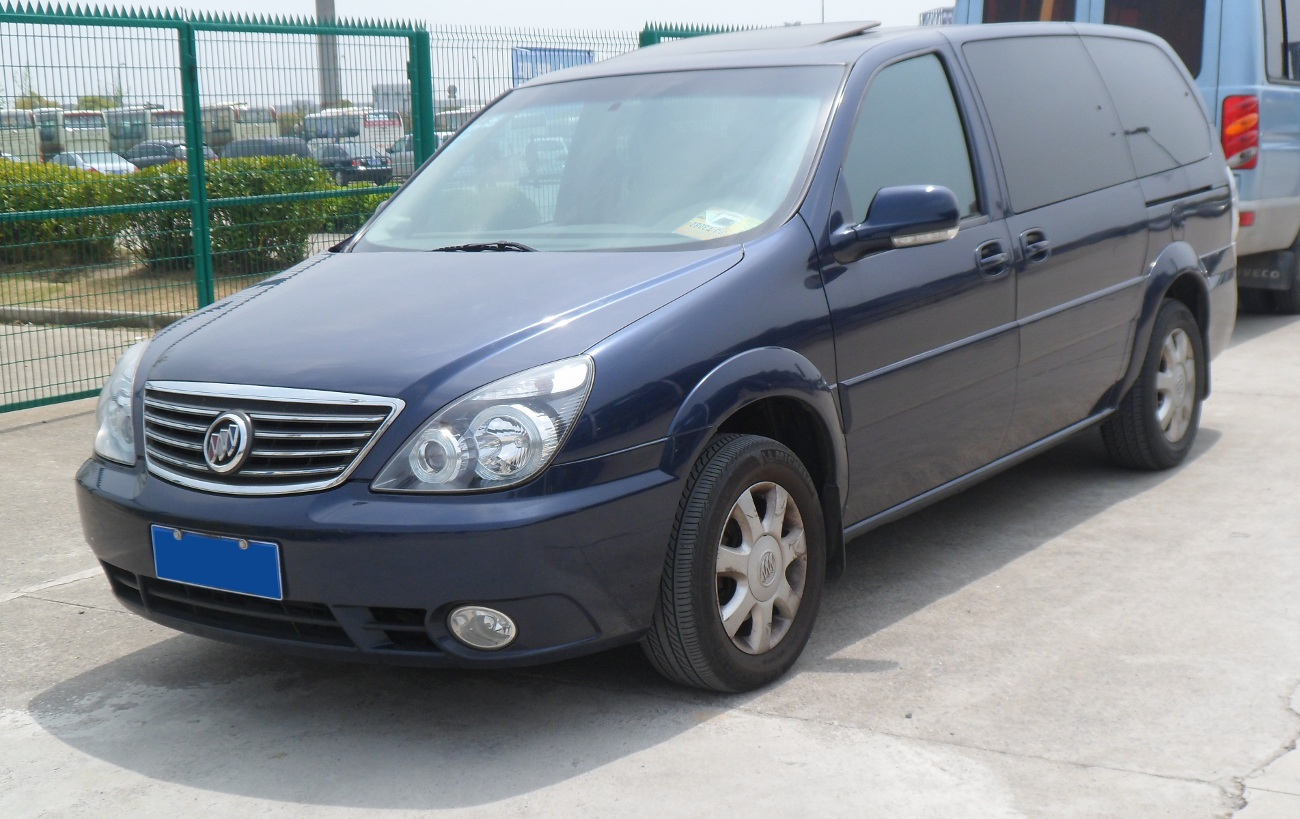
Buick GL8 First Land (2005–2010) front.

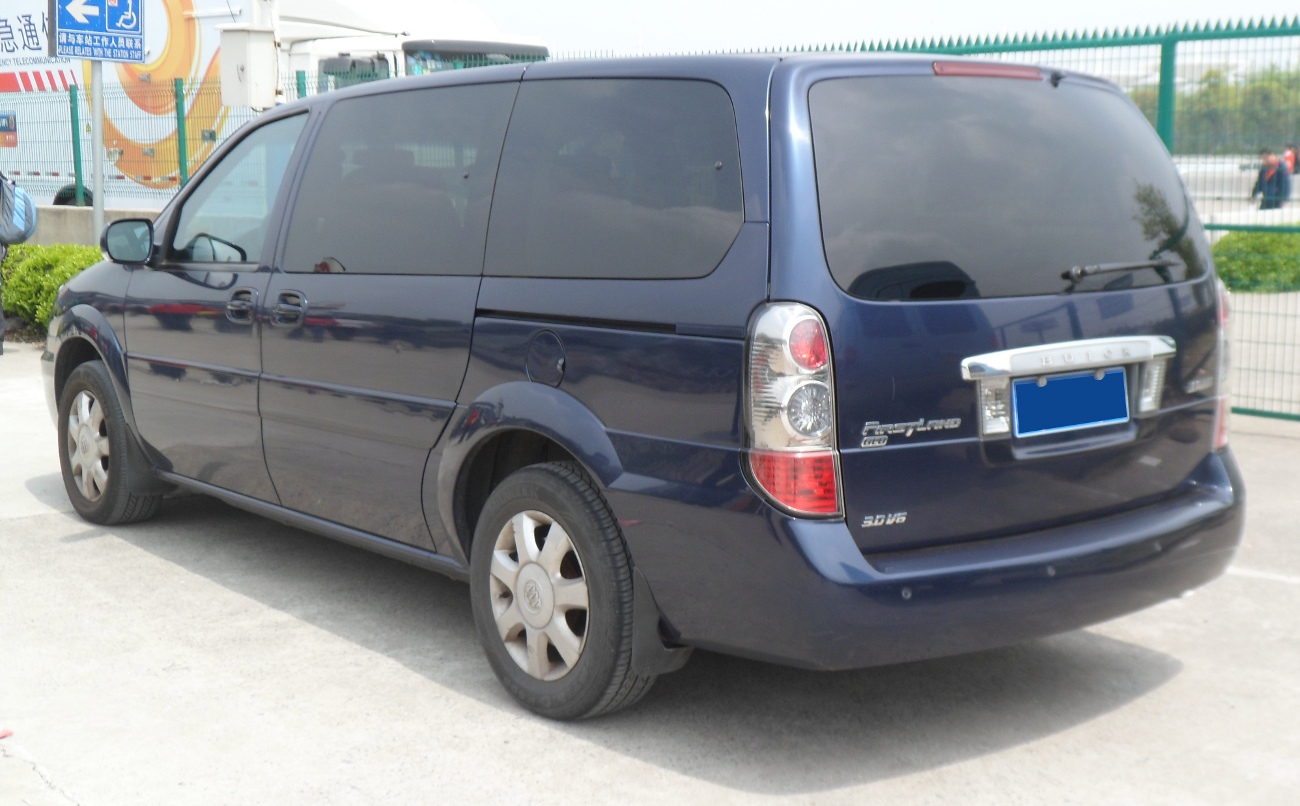
Buick GL8 First Land (2005–2010) rear.

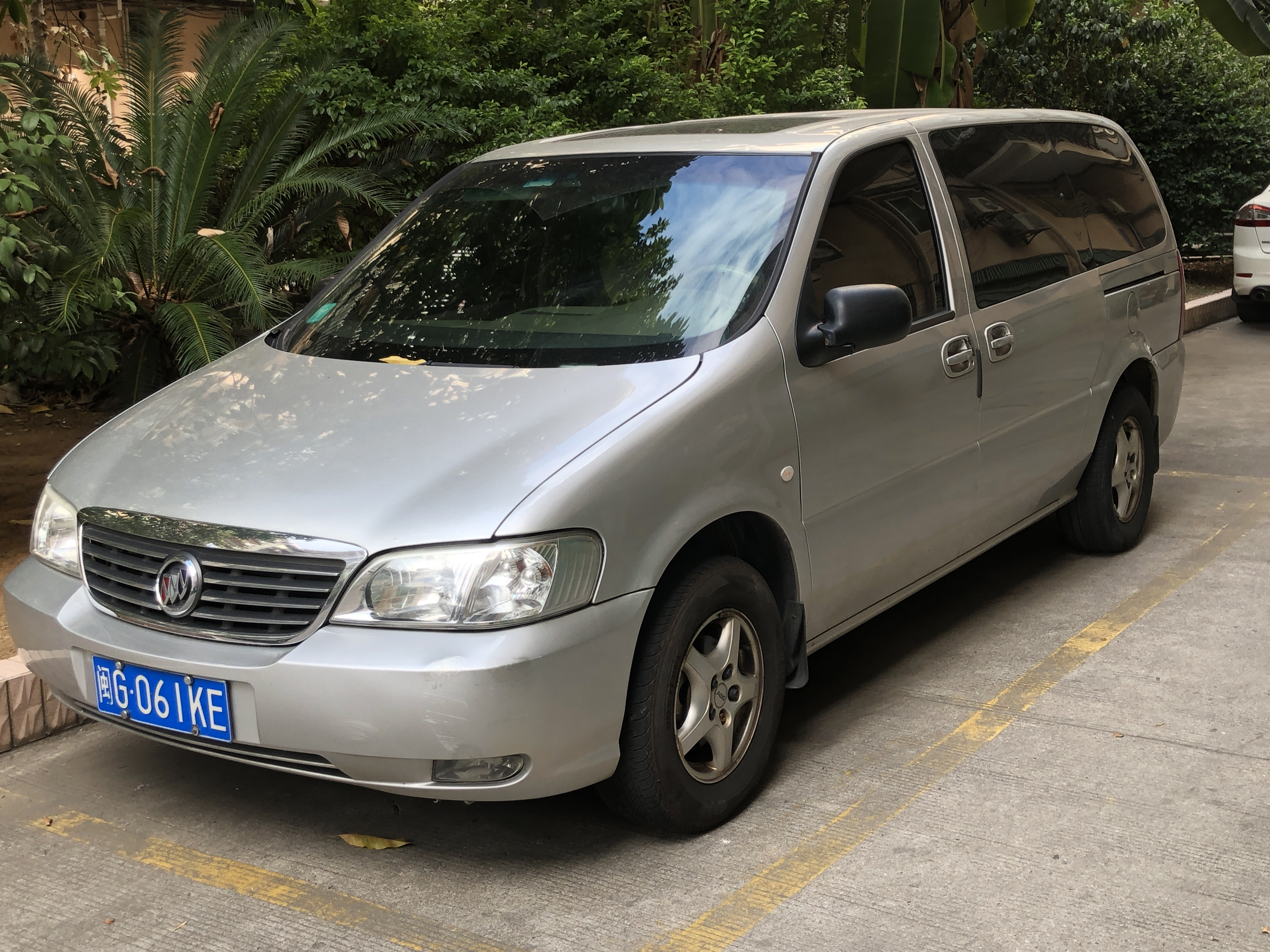
Buick GL8 2.5 (2005–2010) front.

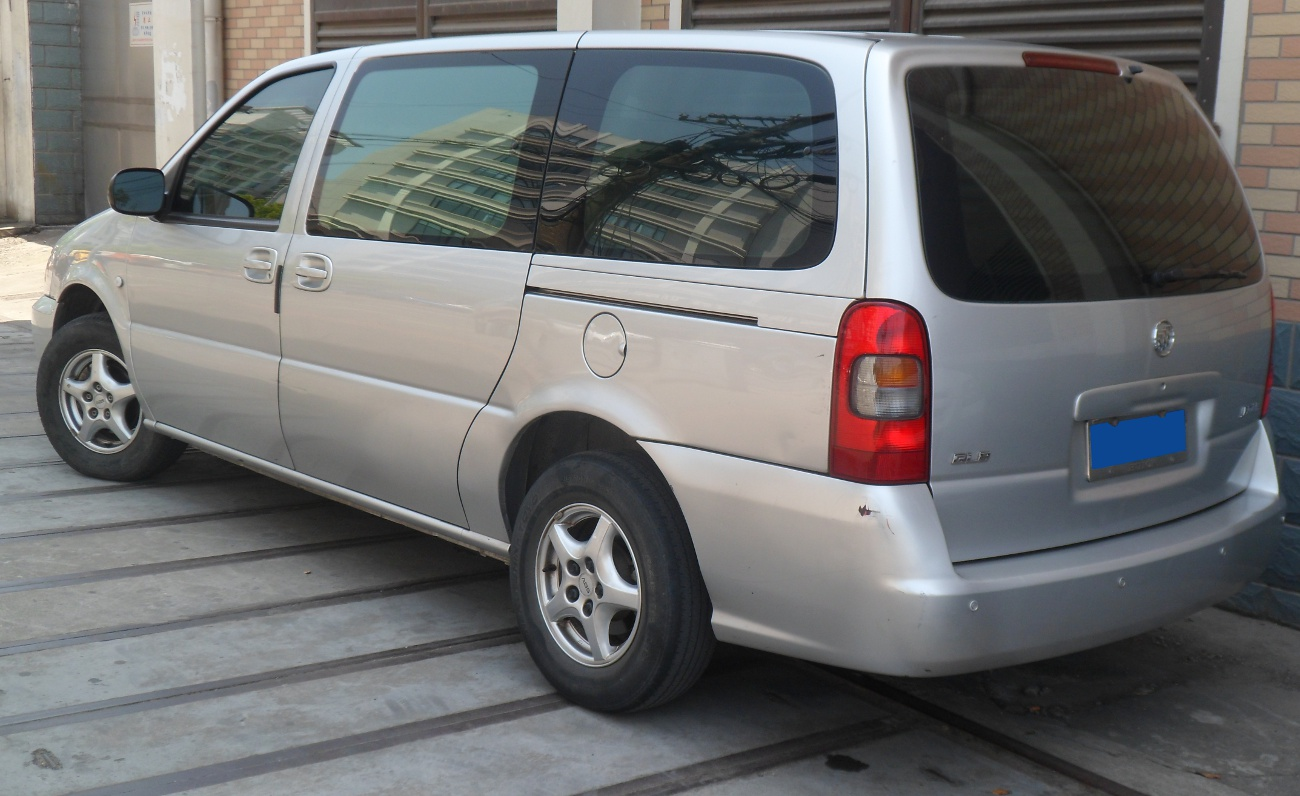
Buick GL8 2.5 (2005–2010) rear.

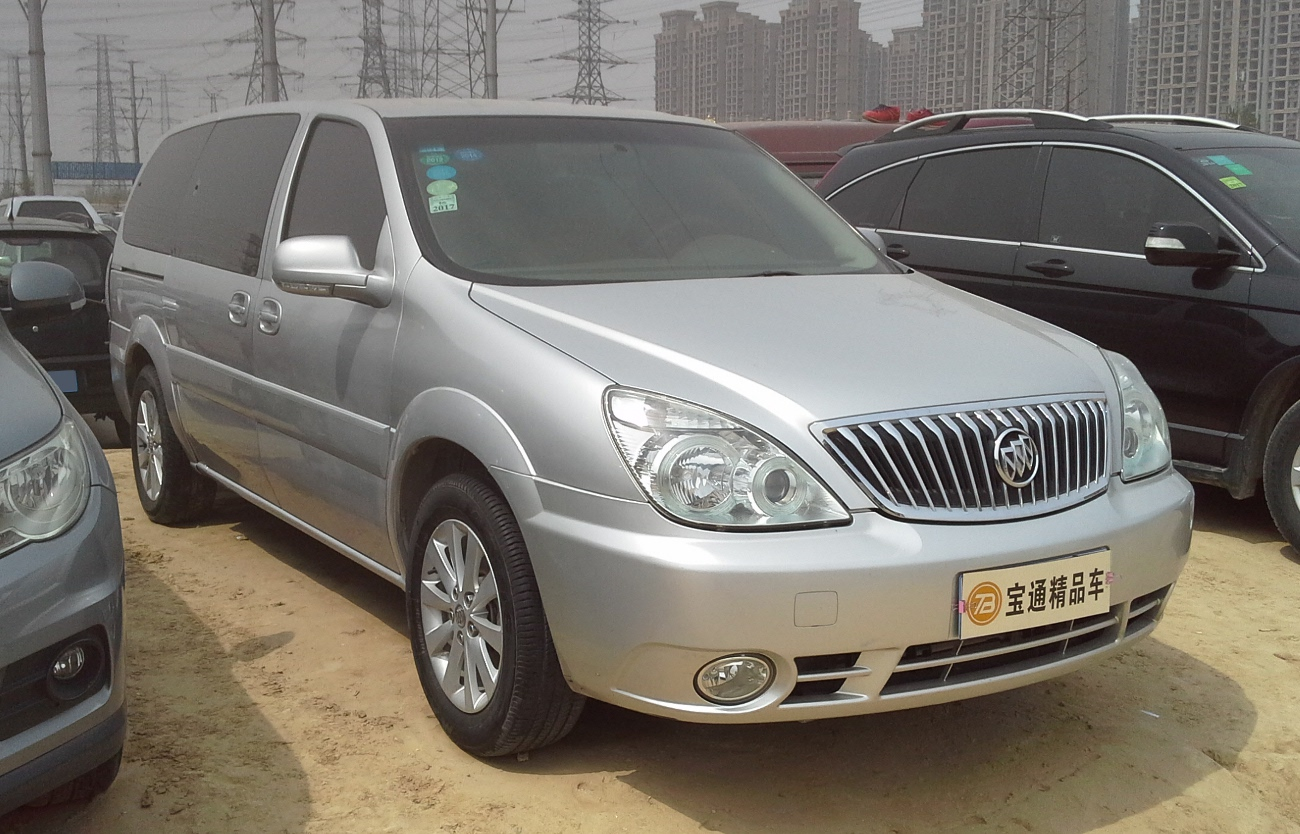
Buick GL8 (2010–2016) front.

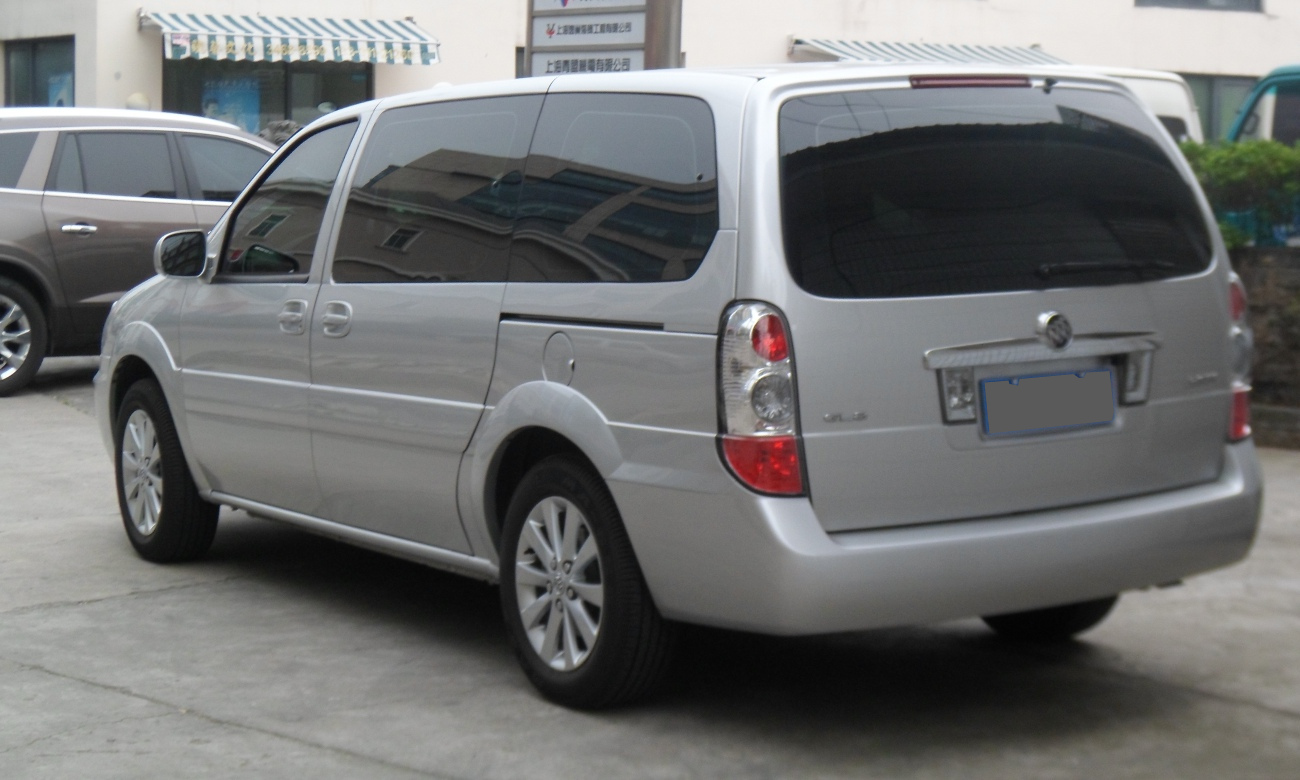
Buick GL8 (2010–2016) rear.

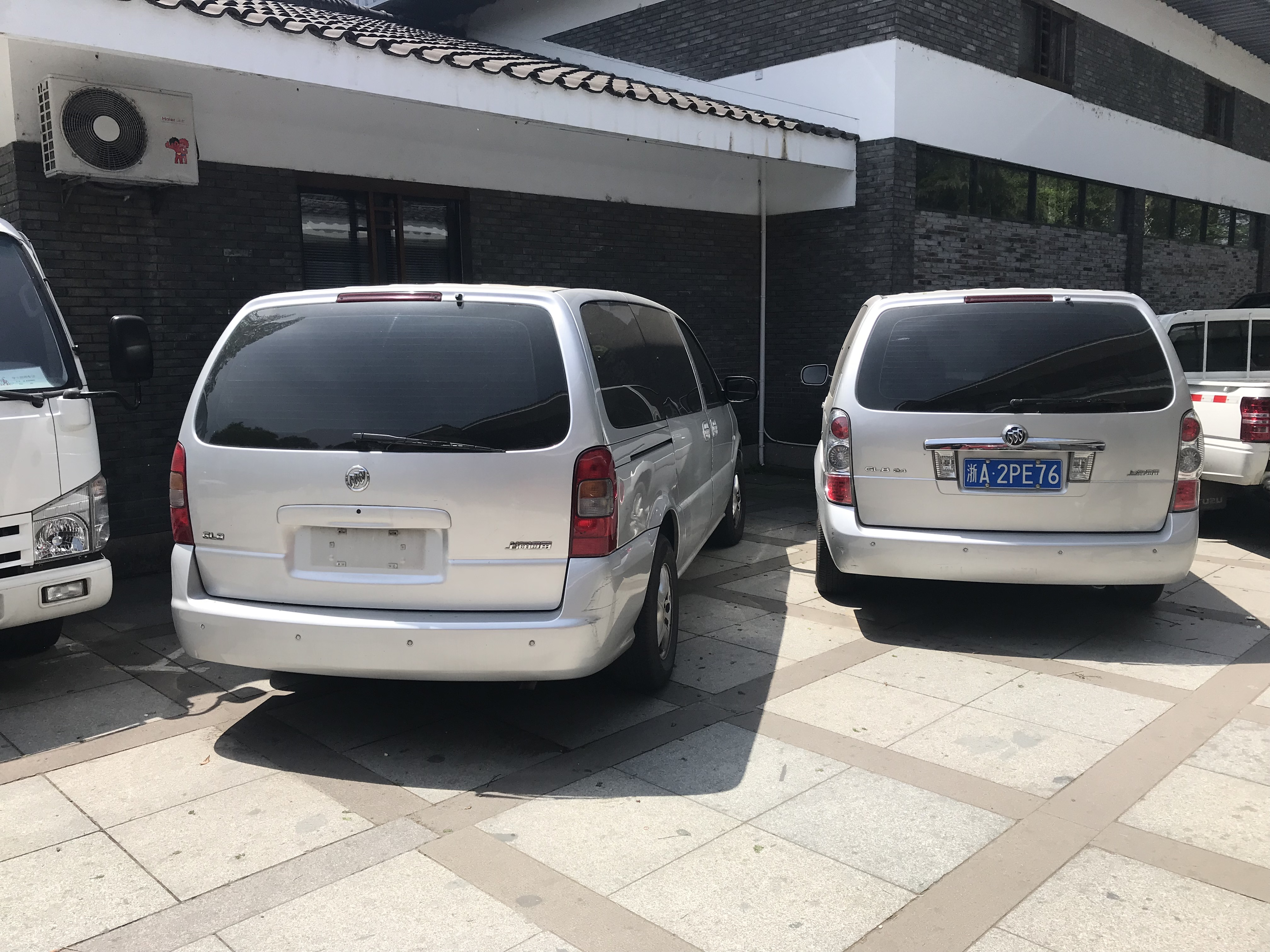
Buick GL8 first facelift (left) and second facelift (right) rear comparison.

Engines:

- GL8 Business Edition: LE5 2.4 L I4
- GL8 2.5: LB8 2.5 L V6
- GL8 First Land: LW9 3.0 L V6

=== Hybrid Prototype ===
In 2001, the Buick GL8 XEA1 or Phoenix was developed as a collaboration between General Motors and Shanghai Automotive Industry Corporation (SAIC). The Buick GL8 XAE1 is a hybrid vehicle that uses a 35 kW fuel cell and compressed hydrogen gas to deliver its power. The General Motors Phoenix was officially unveiled at the Pan Asia Automotive Technology Center in China in 2001.

== GL8 / GL8 Legacy ==
GL8 / GL8 Legacy
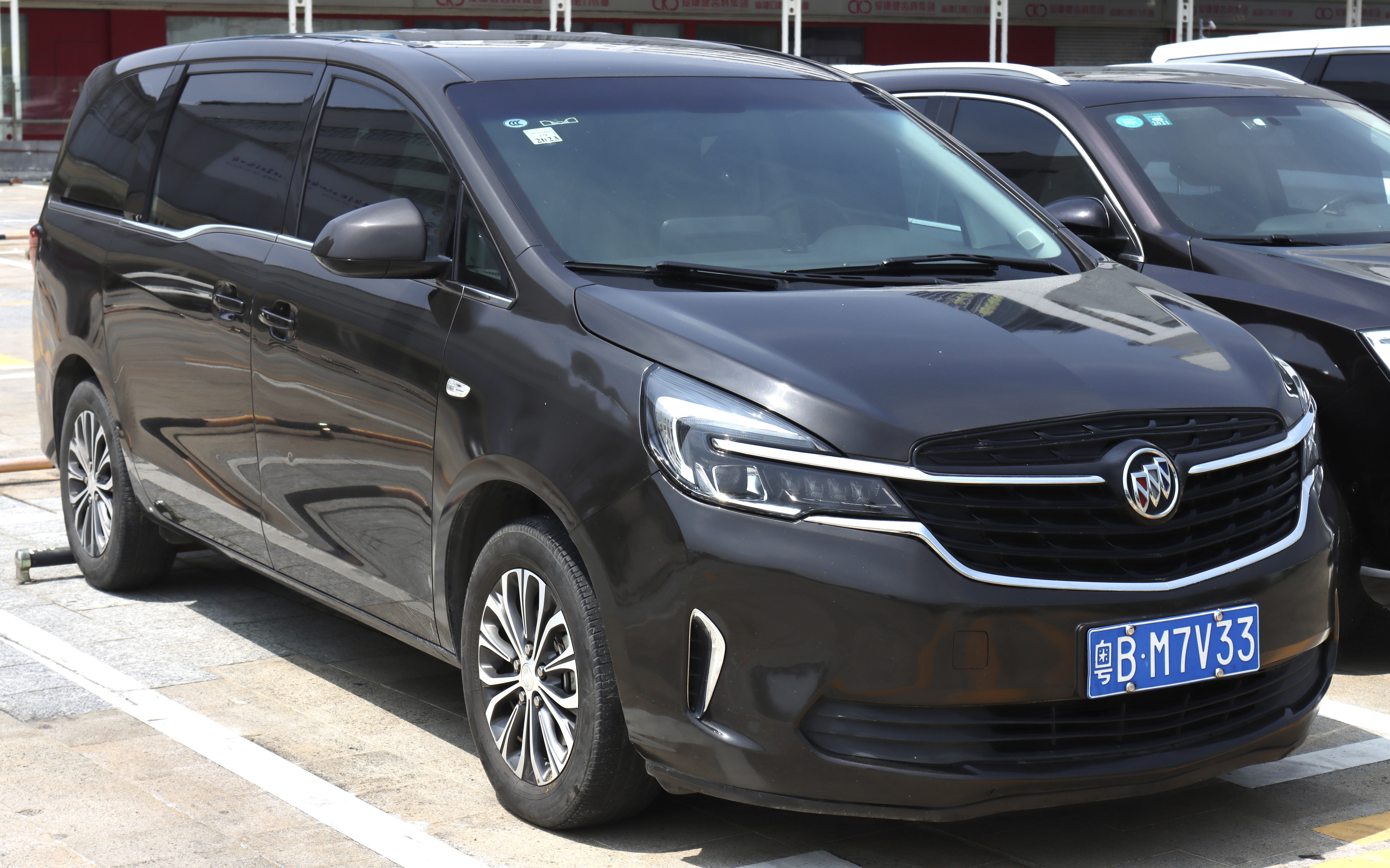
- Buick GL8 II Legacy facelift

Overview
- Production: 2010–2025
- Assembly: Shenyang, Liaoning, China (SAIC-GM Norsom Motors)
- Designer: James C. Shyr

Body and chassis
- Body style: 5-door minivan
- Platform: SGM258 platform

Powertrain
- Engine: 2.0 L LTG turbo I4 (2019); 2.0 L LSY turbo I4 (652T; 2020–21); 2.0 L LXH turbo I4 (2022–25); 2.4 L LE5 I4 (2010–16); 2.5 L LCV I4 (2017–19); 3.0 L LFW V6 (2010–16)
- Transmission: 6-speed DSS automatic (2010–2019); 9-speed 9T50 Hydramatic automatic (652T; 2020–2025)
- Hybrid drivetrain: 48V mild hybrid (2022–25)

Dimensions
- Wheelbase: 3,088 mm (121.6 in)
- Length: 5,256 mm (206.9 in)
- Width: 1,878 mm (73.9 in)
- Height: 1,800 mm (70.9 in)

Introduced in 2010 for the 2011 model year, the GL8 II has an all-new appearance inspired by the Buick Business concept car that was shown in 2009, with a drastic dip in the beltline. The wheelbase is the same as for the GL8 First Land, 3,099 mm (122 in). Developed by the Pan-Asia Technical Automotive Center (PATAC), another joint venture of SAIC Motors with General Motors, the vehicle is based on a vehicle architecture of over a decade old.

Initial engine options include a 2.4-liter DVVT Ecotec four-cylinder and a 3.0-liter DOHC SIDI V6, with a six-speed automatic gearbox available for the V6. To differentiate the new GL8 from its predecessor, which remains on sale as the "Business Edition", the second generation was sold as the "Luxury Business Edition" (Chinese: GL8豪华商务车; pinyin: GL8 háohuá shāngwù chē).

Pre-facelift styling

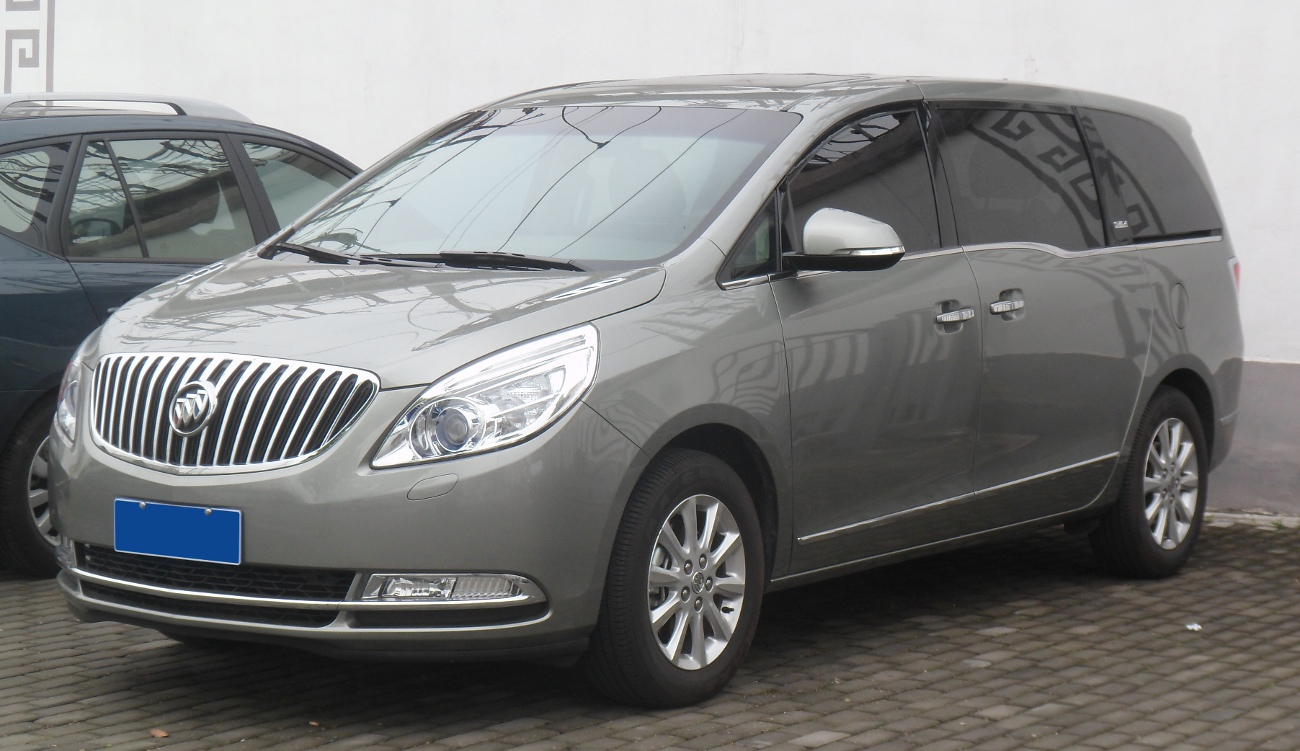
Buick GL8 II
(pre-facelift; 2010–14) front view

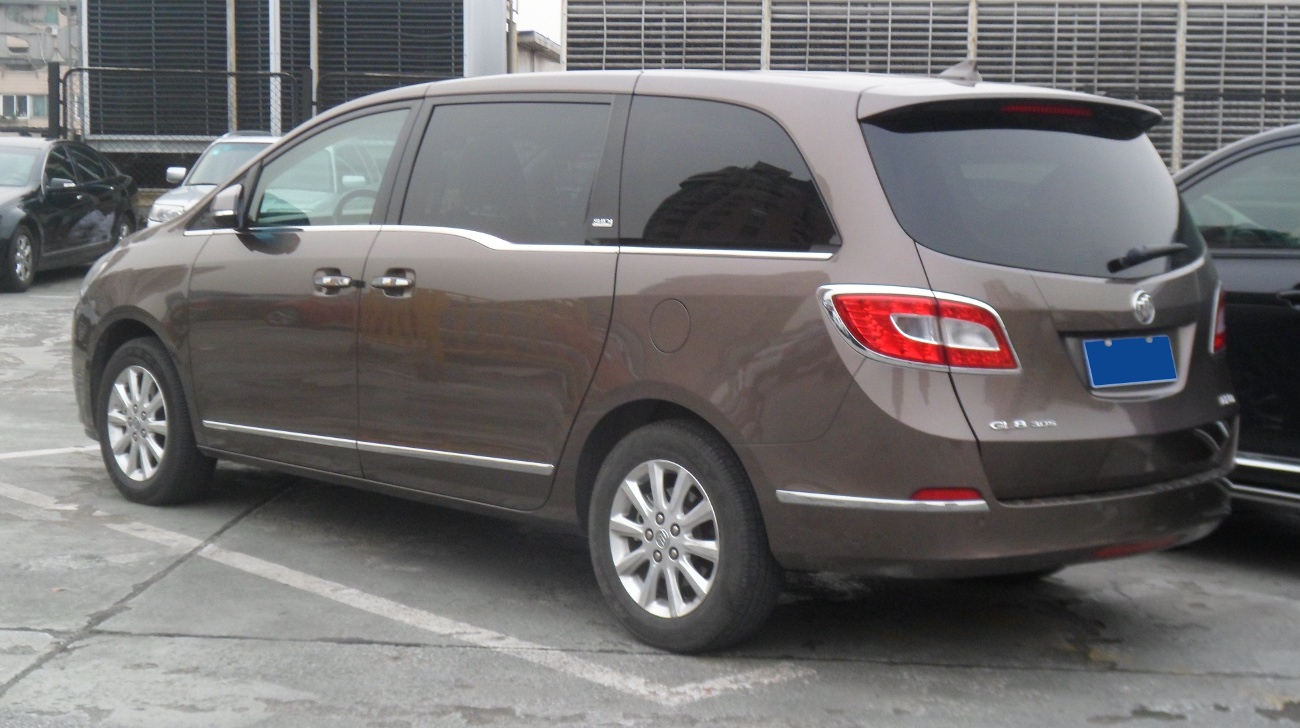
Rear view

=== 2017 facelift ===
After the third generation GL8 went on sale in November 2016, the second generation GL8 was temporarily discontinued while the first generation continued on sale. In March 2017, the first generation was discontinued and the second generation was relaunched to replace it with updated styling and was marketed as the "Business Traveler" and referred to internally as the "GL8 Legacy" to differentiate it from the newer GL8 ES and Avenir (third generation). It was available solely with a new engine, the LCV 2.5-liter DVVT Ecotec, and the old 3.0-liter V6 was canceled. In late 2018, the 2.0-liter turbocharged LTG was added to the engine lineup and became the sole engine option after the 2.5-liter was discontinued in mid-2019.

2014 facelift styling

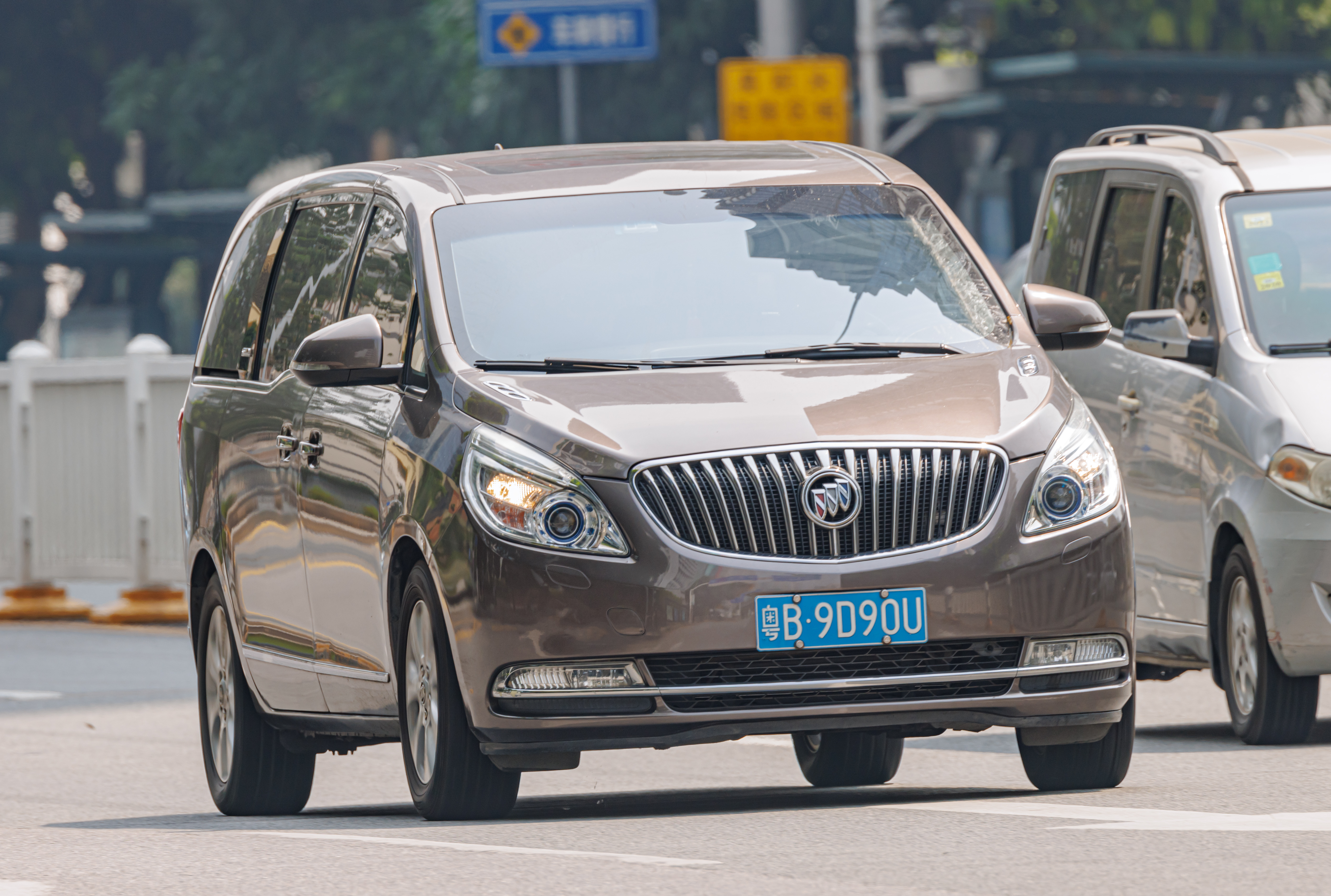
Buick GL8 II
(2014–16) front view

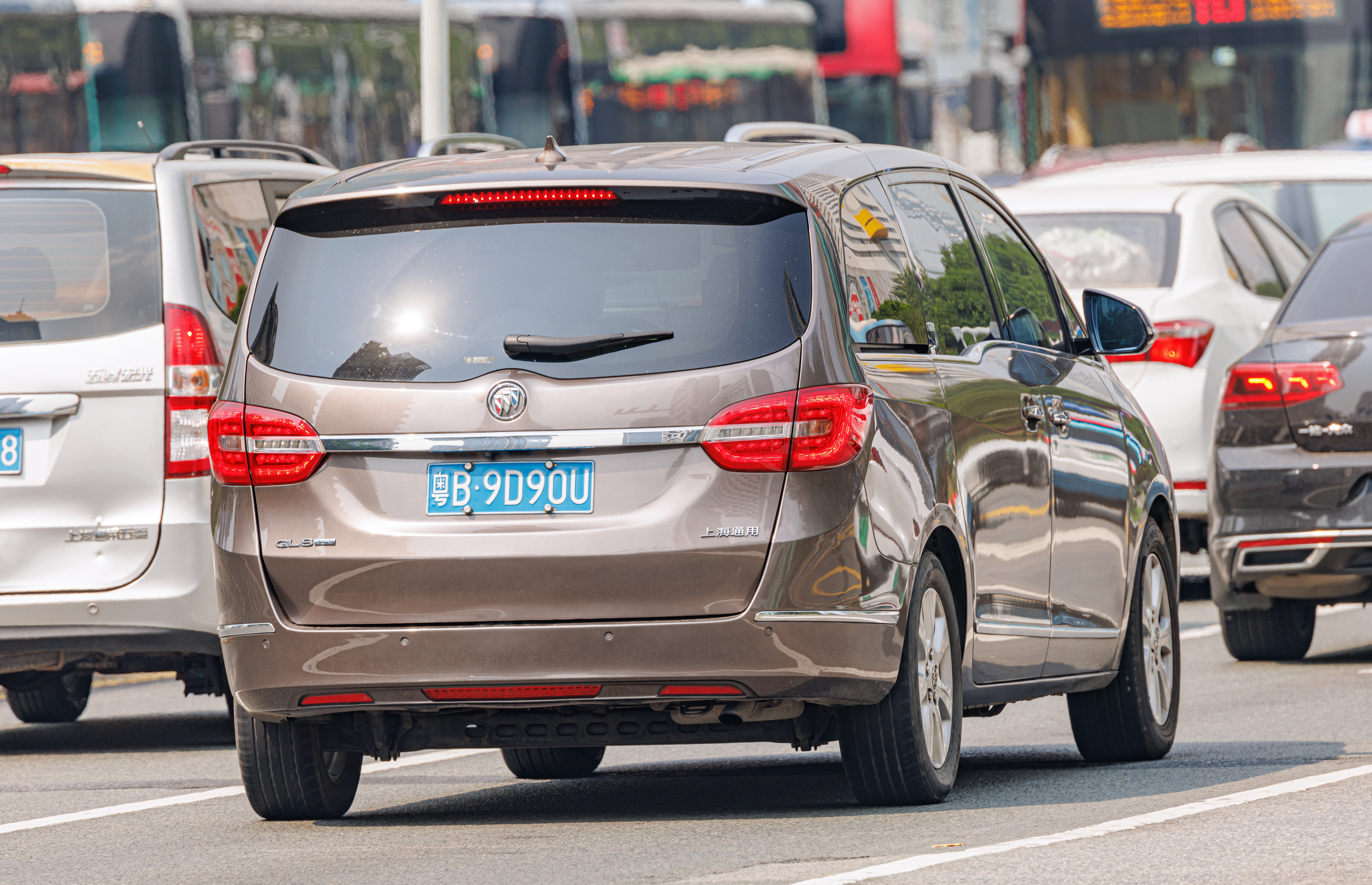
Rear view
2017 facelift styling

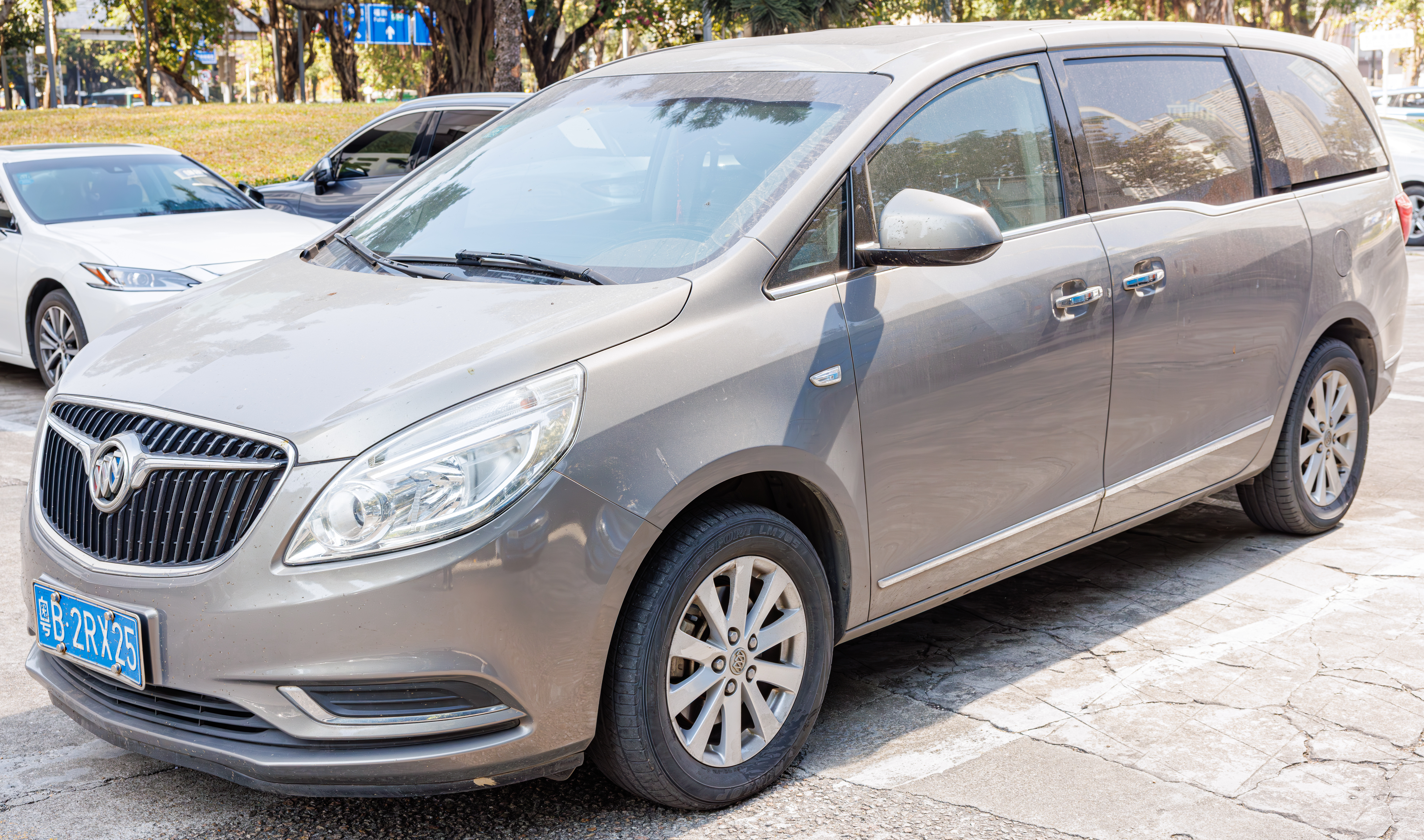
GL8 II Legacy
(2017–19) front view

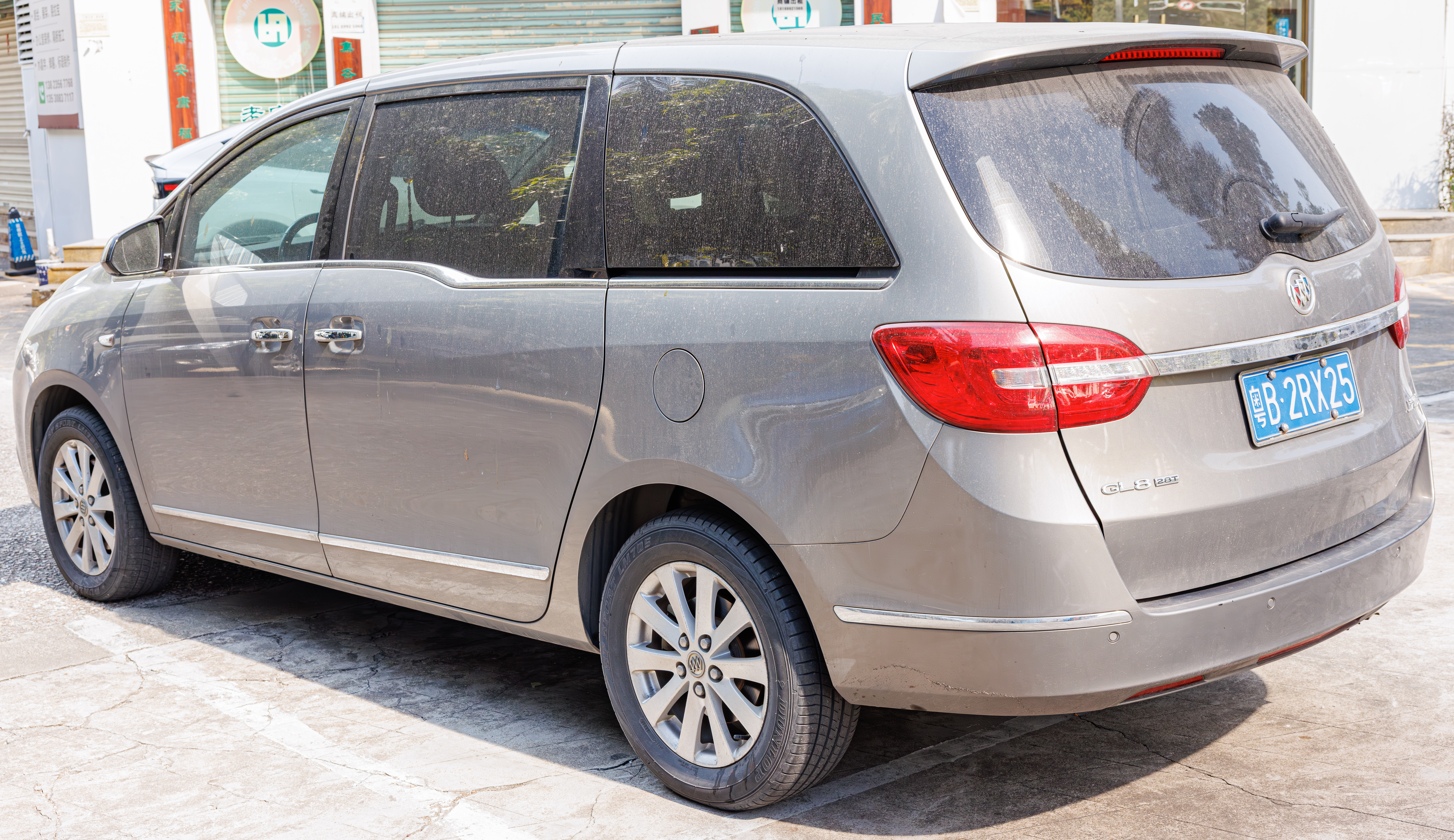
Rear view

=== 2020 facelift ===
This generation GL8 was given a facelift with a new exterior in May 2020 marketed as the "Legacy" or "Land Business Class" (Chinese: GL8陆上公务舱; pinyin: GL8 lù shàng gōngwù cāng; lit. 'GL8 onshore business class cabin') and had a single trim level on offer known as the 652T. The 2.0-litre LSY turbocharged petrol engine is standard paired with the 9-speed Hydramatic automatic gearbox. Twelve models are available and pricing ranges from 232,900 yuan to 529,900 yuan (US$33,320 to US$75,820 - July 2020 exchange rate).

2020 facelift styling

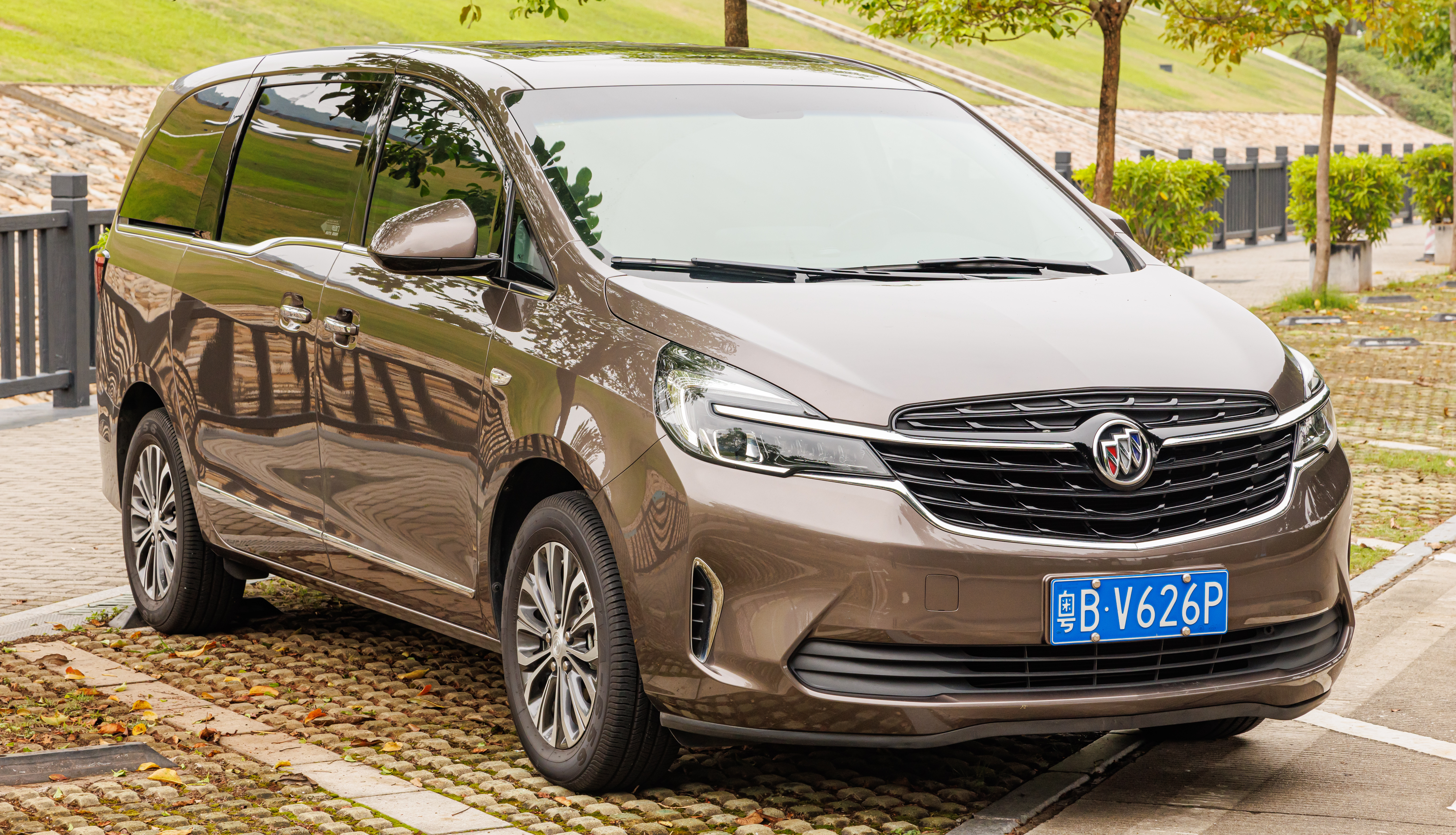
Buick GL8 II Legacy facelift (2020–22) front.

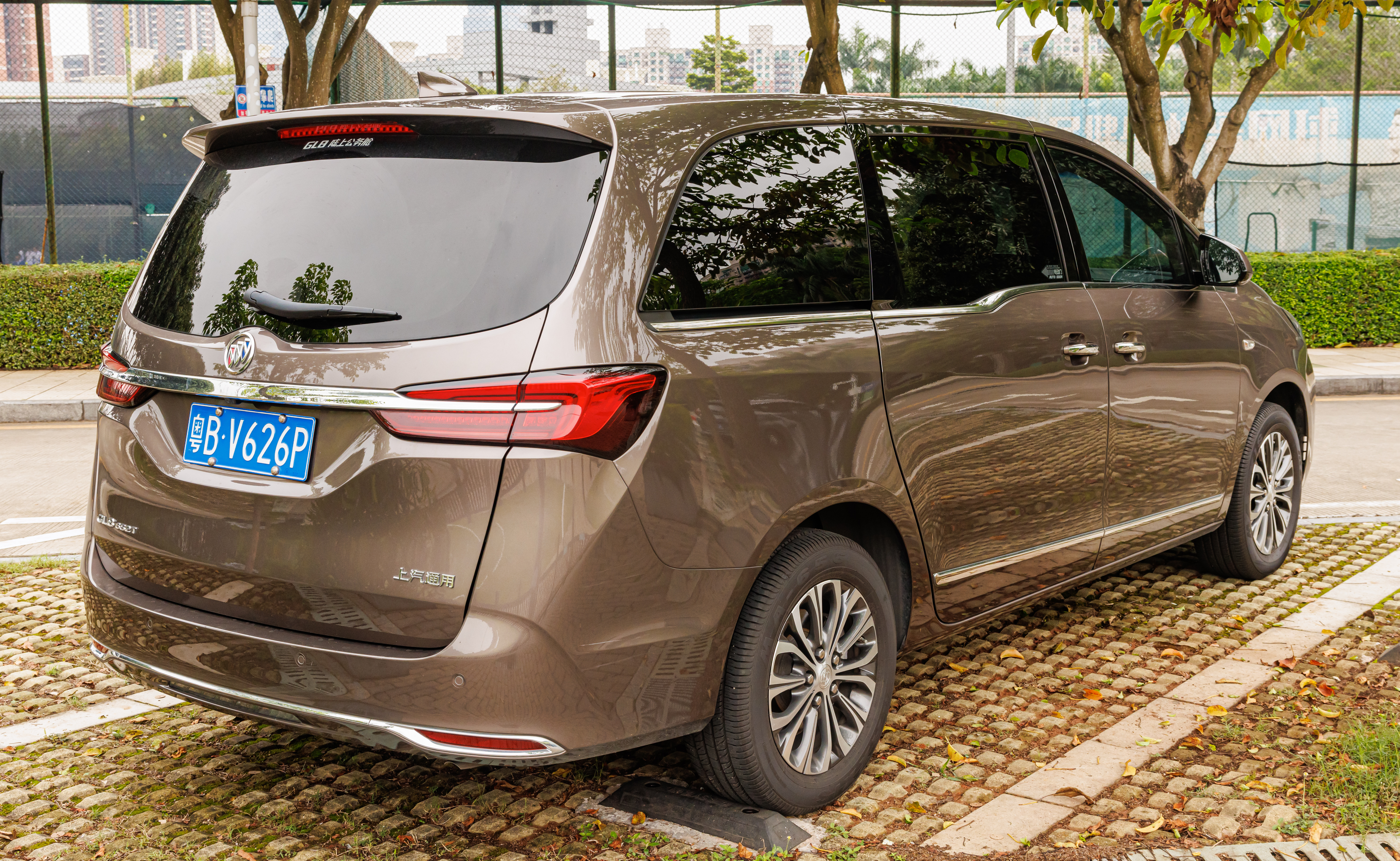
Rear view.

=== 2022 facelift ===
The second generation GL8 or GL8 Legacy received another facelift in 2022 launched alongside the flagship Century MPV and the 2022 facelifted third generation GL8 Avenir and ES Lu Zun. The engine was updated to the LXH model, which is an updated version of the previous 2.0-liter LSY engine with a 48V mild hybrid system and is modified to meet China 6b emissions standards.

2022 facelift styling

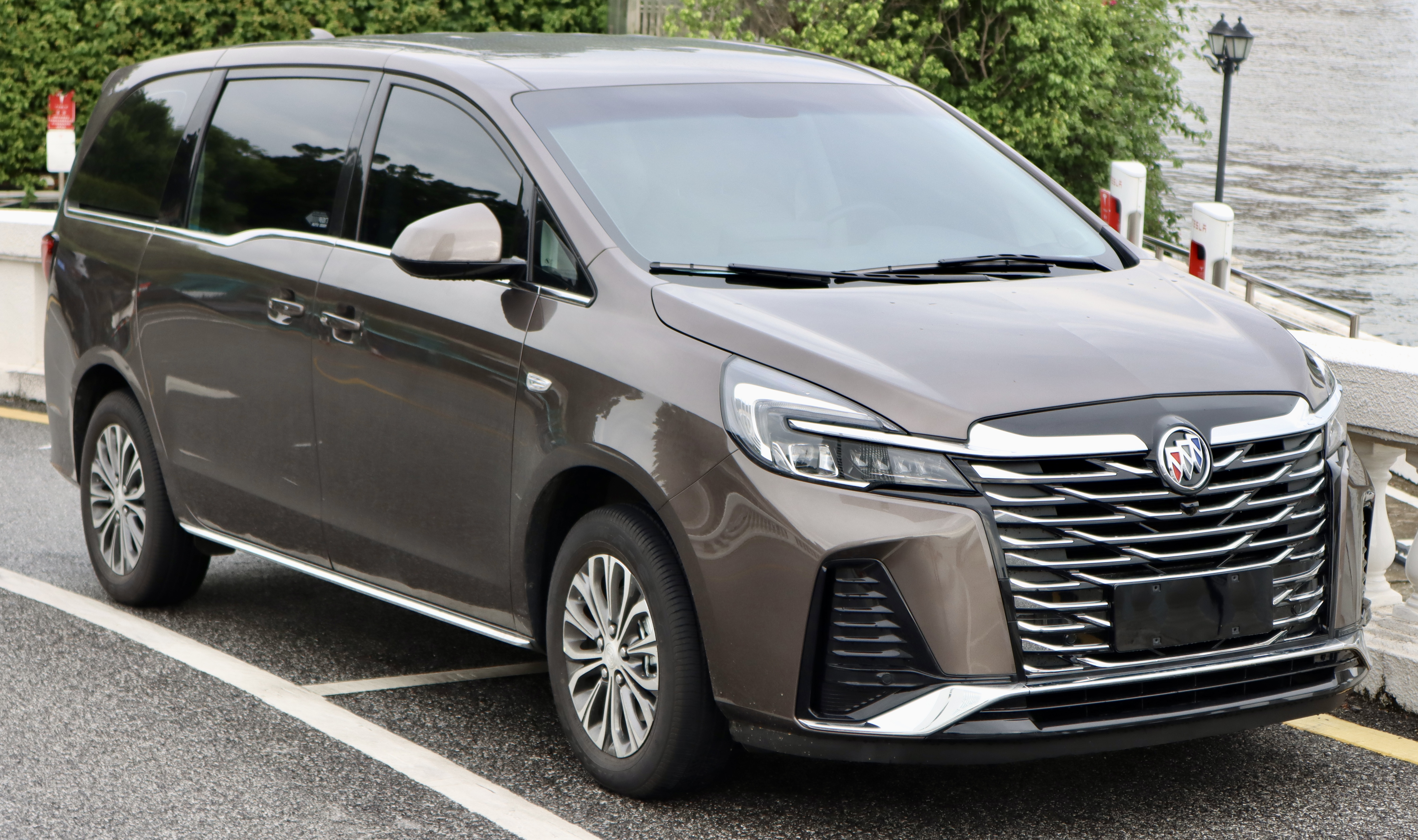
Buick GL8 II Legacy (2022–25) front view

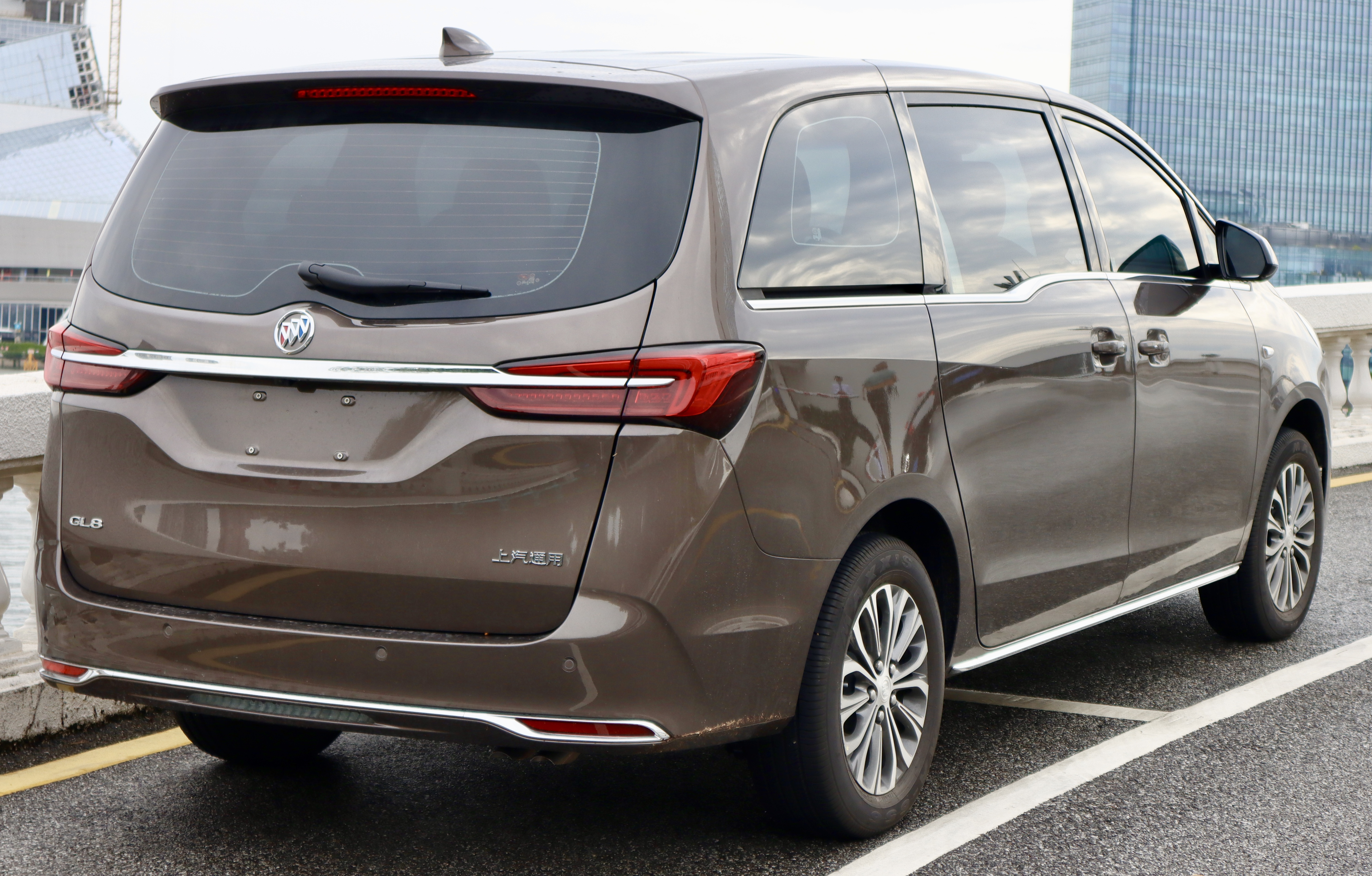
Rear view

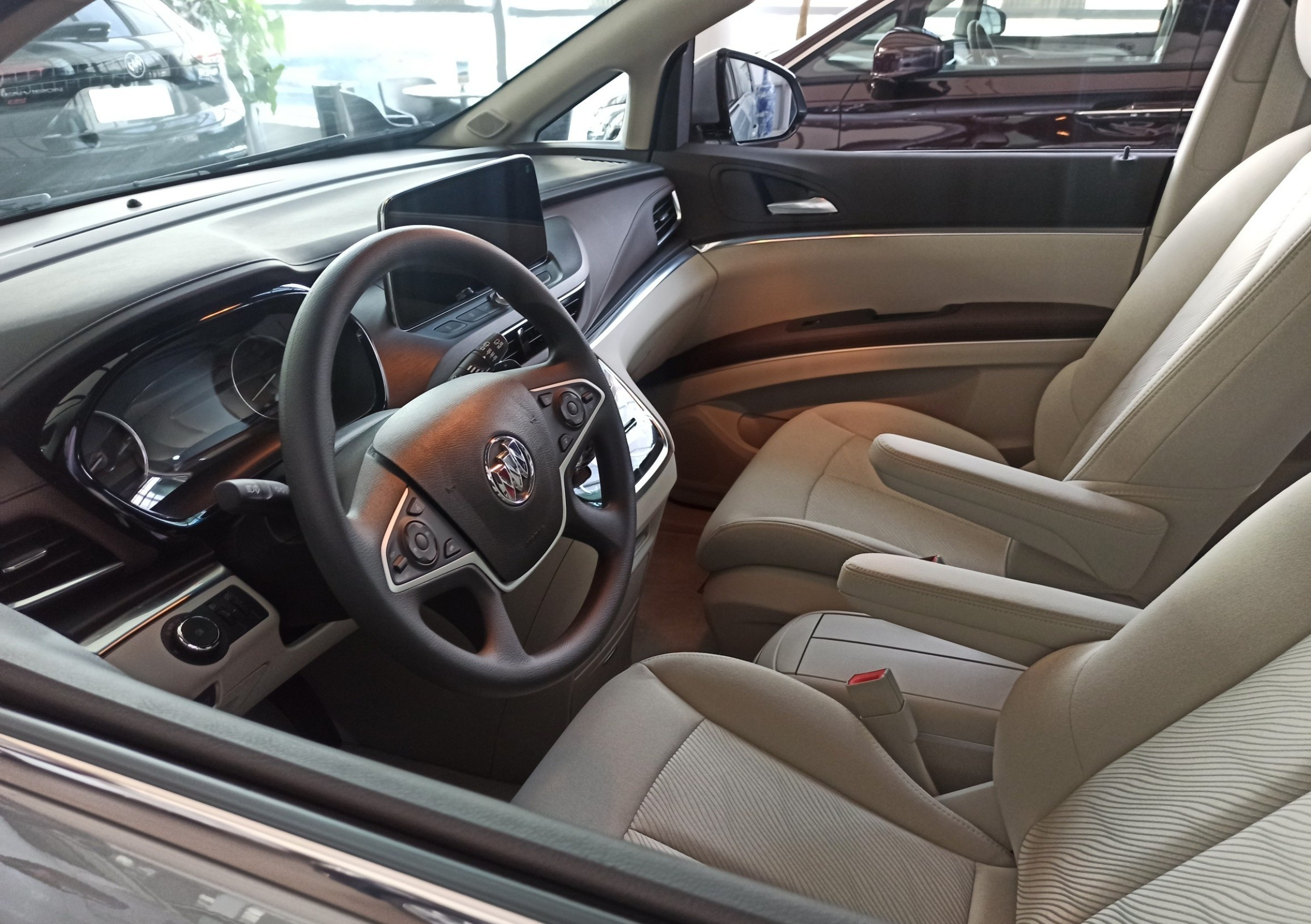
Interior

The second generation GL8 was finally discontinued after 15 years of production in February 2025 with the closure of the SAIC-GM Norsom assembly plant.

== GL8 ES Lu Zun/Lu Shang ==
GL8 ES Lu Zun / GL8 Avenir / GL8 Lu Shang / GL8 Onshore Business
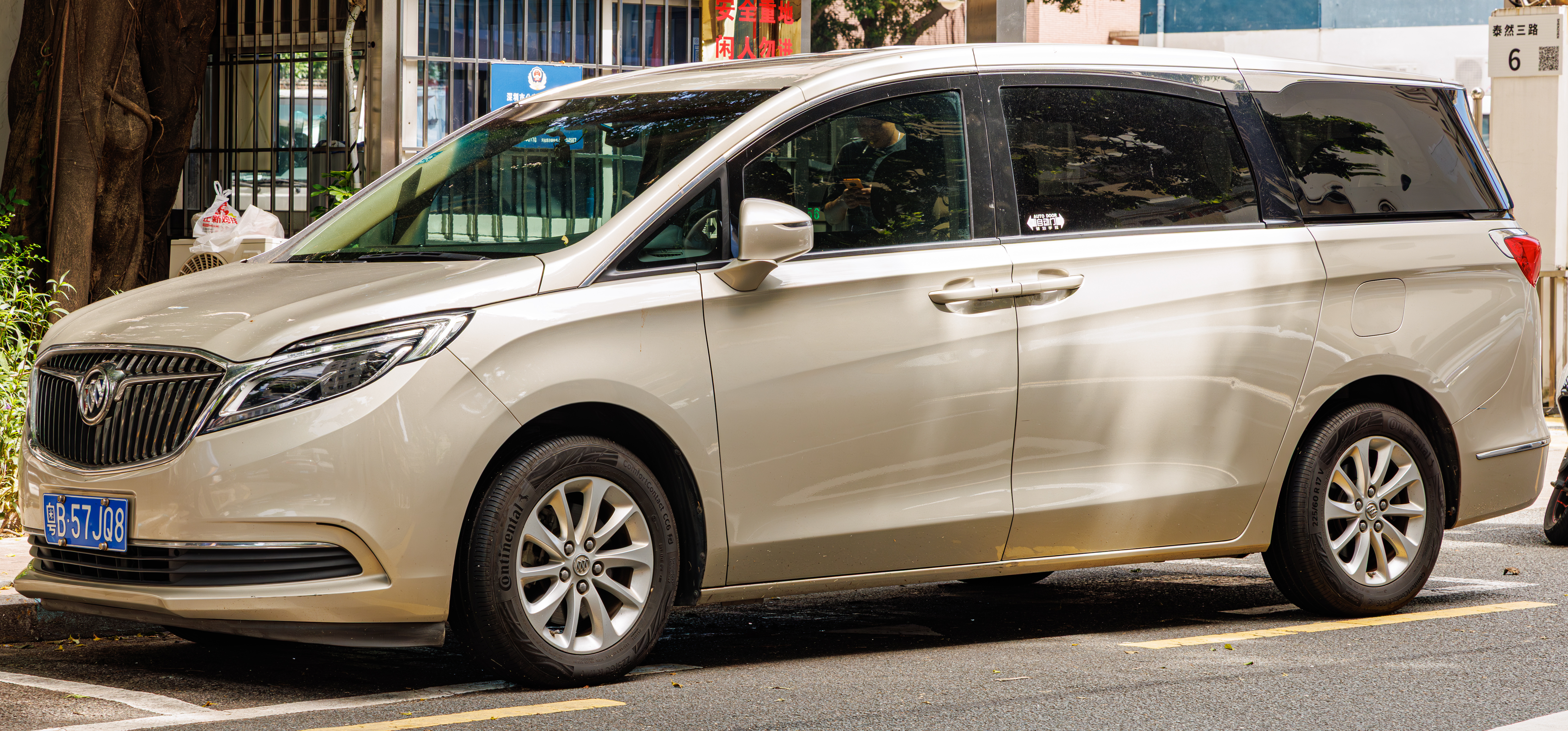
- Buick GL8 ES

Overview
- Production: 2016–present
- Assembly: China: Jinqiao, Shanghai (SAIC-GM)
- Designer: Nicolas Huet

Body and chassis
- Body style: 5-door minivan
- Platform: SGM358 platform

Powertrain
- Engine: 2.0 L LTG turbo I4 (2017–2019); 2.0 L LSY turbo I4 (653T; 2020–2021); 2.0 L LXH turbo I4 (653T; 2022–present)
- Transmission: 2-speed DHT (PHEV; 2024–present); 6-speed DSS automatic (2017–2019); 9-speed 9T50 Hydramatic automatic (2020–present)
- Hybrid drivetrain: 48V mild hybrid; Series-parallel plug-in hybrid
- Battery: 24.4 kWh LFP Zenergy; 34.8 kWh NMC Zenergy
- Electric range: 111–150 km (69–93 mi) (WLTP); 138–202 km (86–126 mi) (CLTC)

Dimensions
- Wheelbase: 3,088 mm (121.6 in)
- Length: 5,203–5,256 mm (204.8–206.9 in)
- Width: 1,878 mm (73.9 in)
- Height: 1,776 mm (69.9 in)–1,811 mm (71.3 in)

The third generation GL8 debuted in China in October 2016 and was marketed as the GL8 ES, and GL8 Avenir for the top trim. It was initially sold alongside the first generation model, and soon afterwards was sold alongside the second generation model since 2017.

The Buick GL8 ES and Avenir received a complete exterior overhaul using the newly introduced winged Buick grille treatment, as well as a redesigned roofline. The entire engine lineup was replaced by a 2.0-liter turbocharged inline-four producing 253 hp (189 kW; 257 PS).

The GL8 ES and Avenir is based on an updated version of the same platform, abandoning the previous torsion beam rear suspension in favor of a new independent setup.

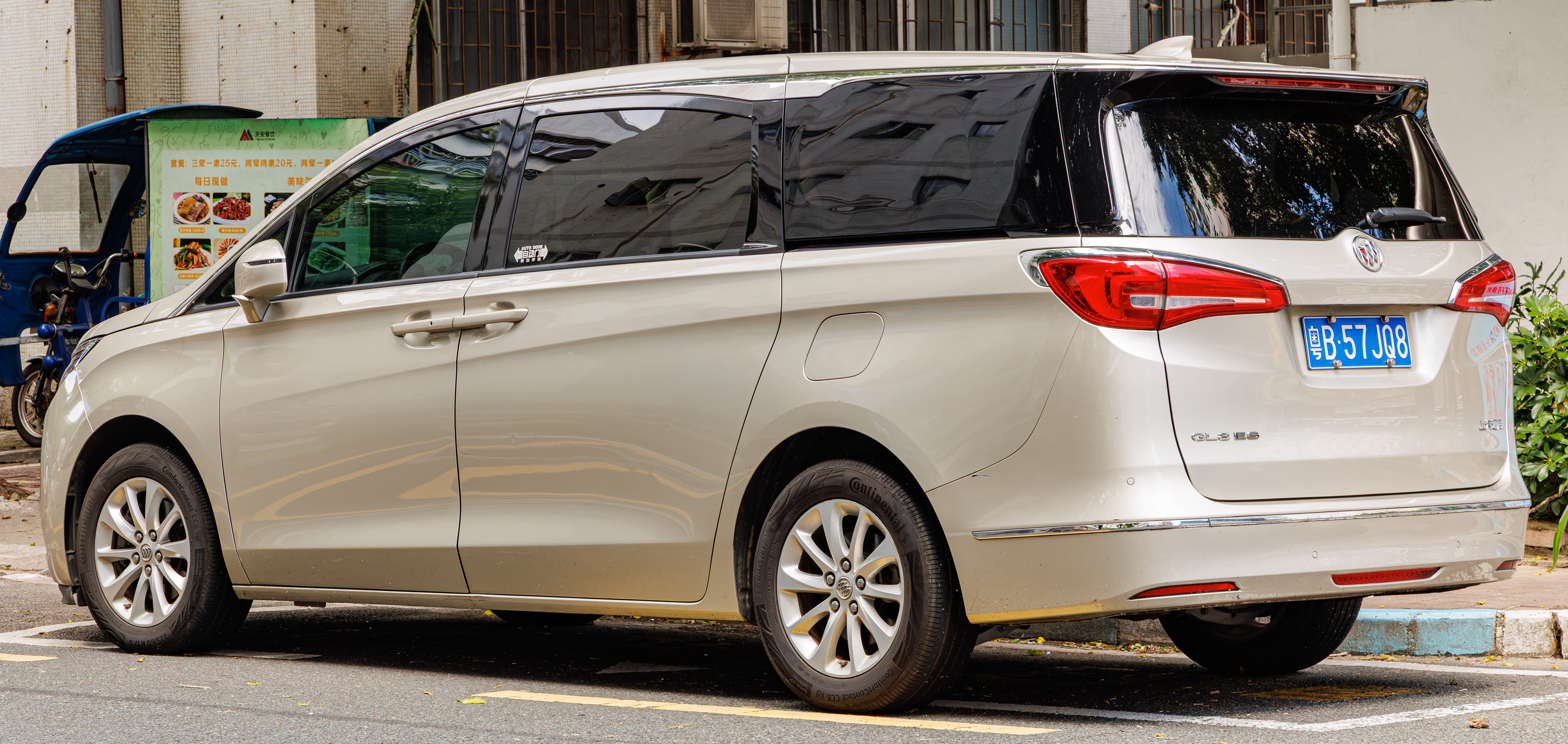
Buick GL8 ES (rear)

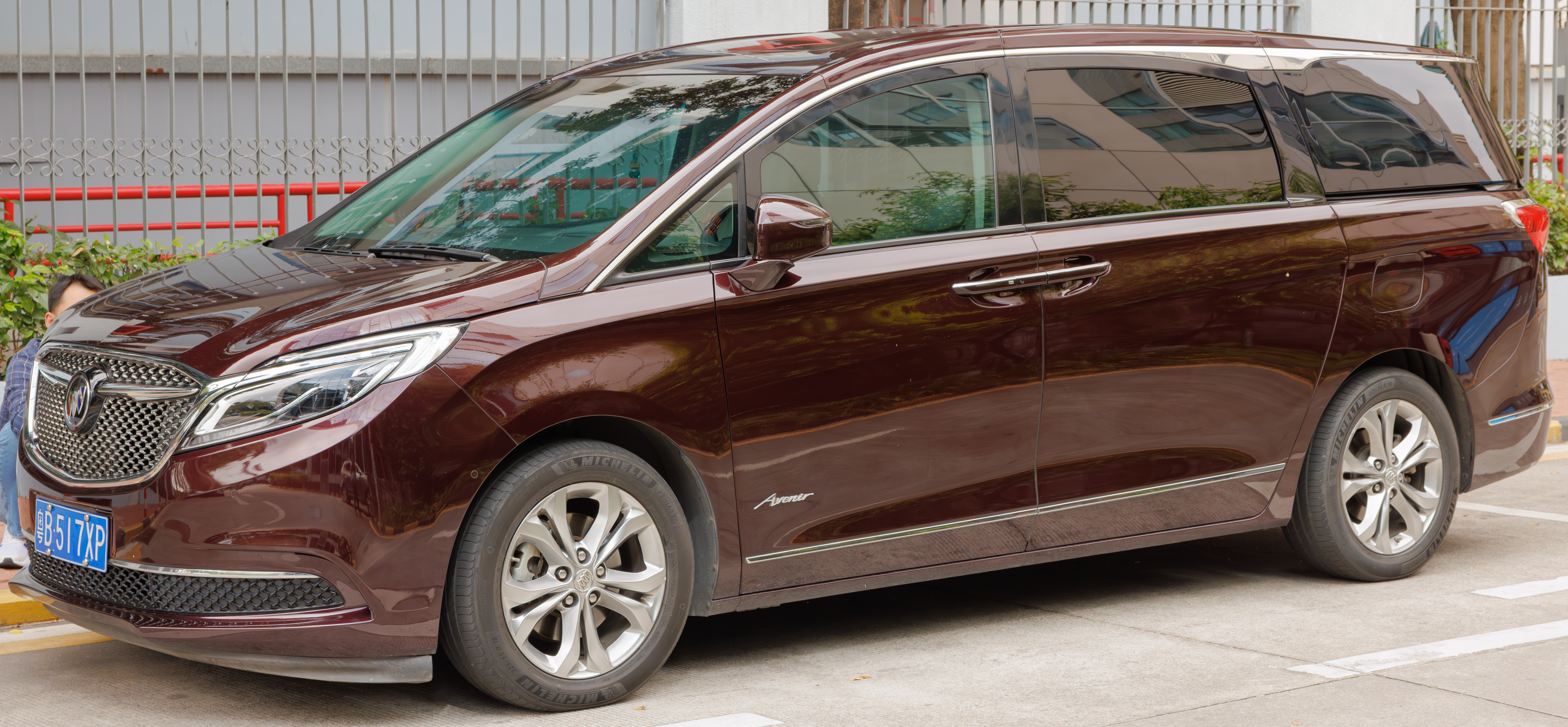
Buick GL8 Avenir

=== 2020 facelift ===
Originally revealed as the Buick GL8 Avenir concept during the 2019 Shanghai Auto Show, the production GL8 ES Lu Zun (Chinese: GL8 ES陆尊; lit. 'GL8 ES Land First-Class') and GL8 Avenir (Chinese: 别克GL8艾维亚) facelift was revealed in March 2020. The GL8 Avenir and ES Lu Zun facelift is available with a four (Avenir only), six (Avenir only) and seven-seat configurations. Technology is a significant focus for the post-facelift GL8, including the 12.3-inch integrated display and Buick's eConnect 3.0 connectivity technology and head-up display. It uses an updated turbocharged 2.0-liter engine now paired with a 9-speed automatic transmission, and is badged 653T. In mid-2021, the engine was updated to use a 48-volt mild hybrid system.

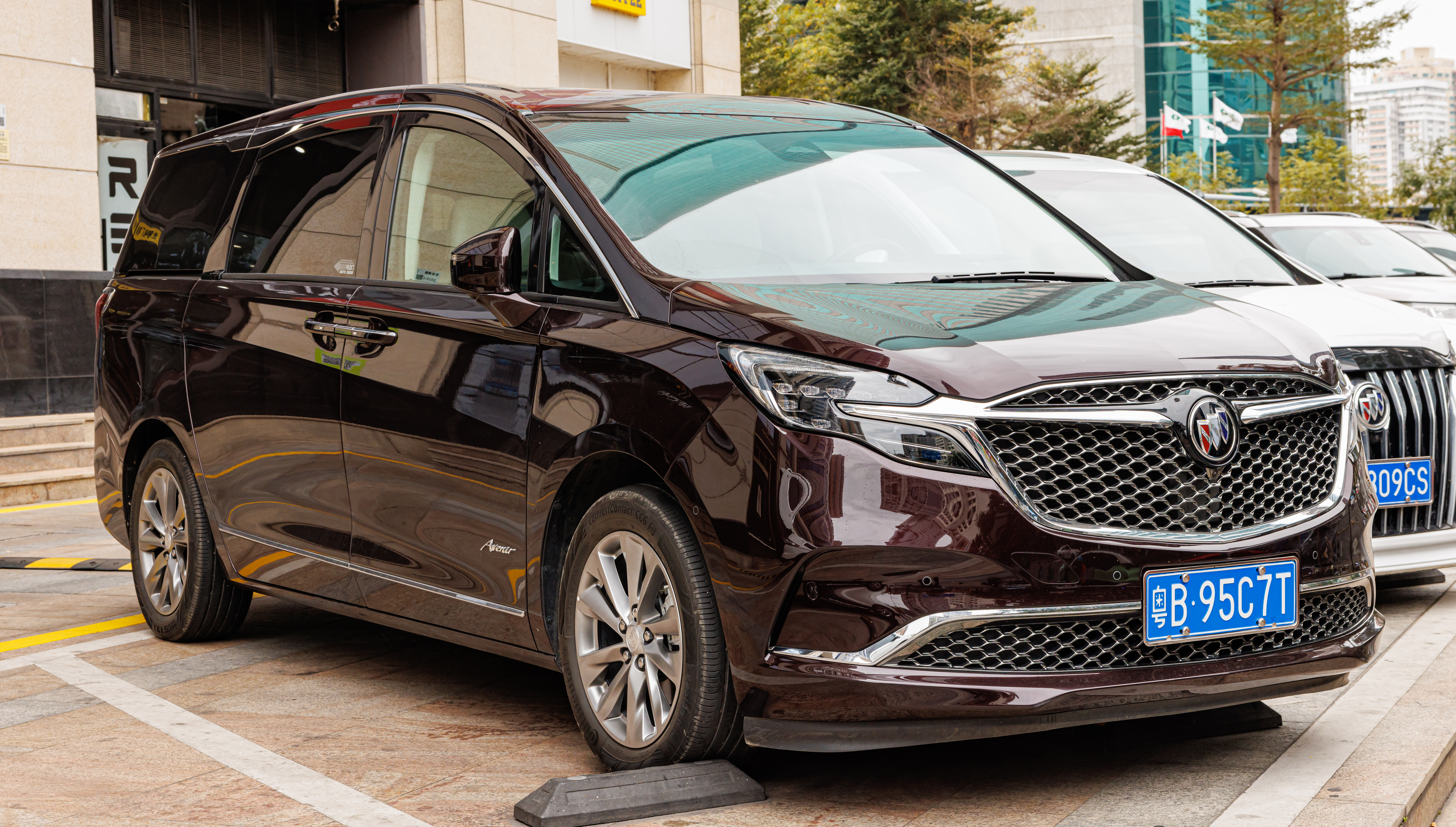
Buick GL8 Avenir facelift

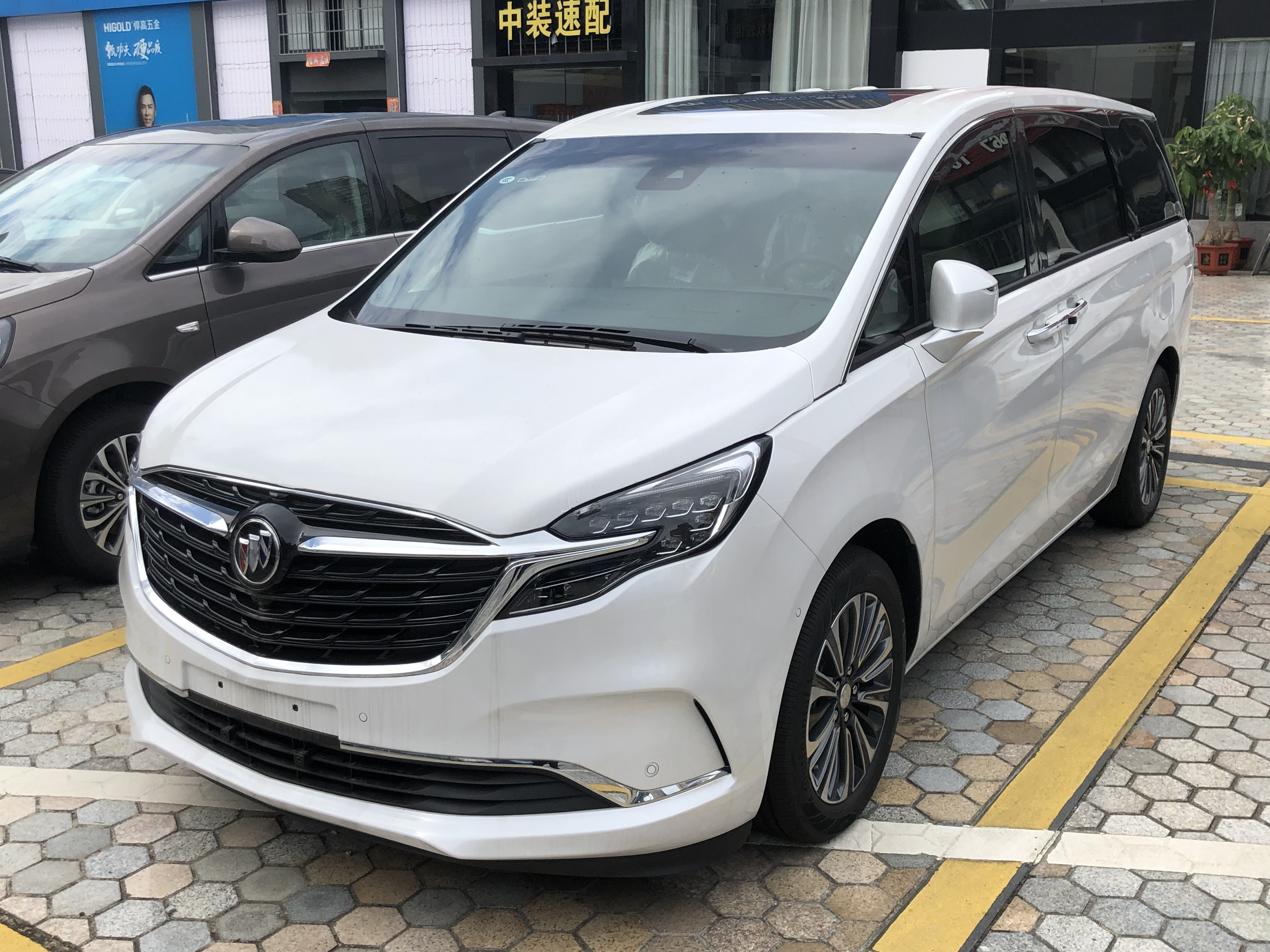
Buick GL8 ES Lu Zun facelift

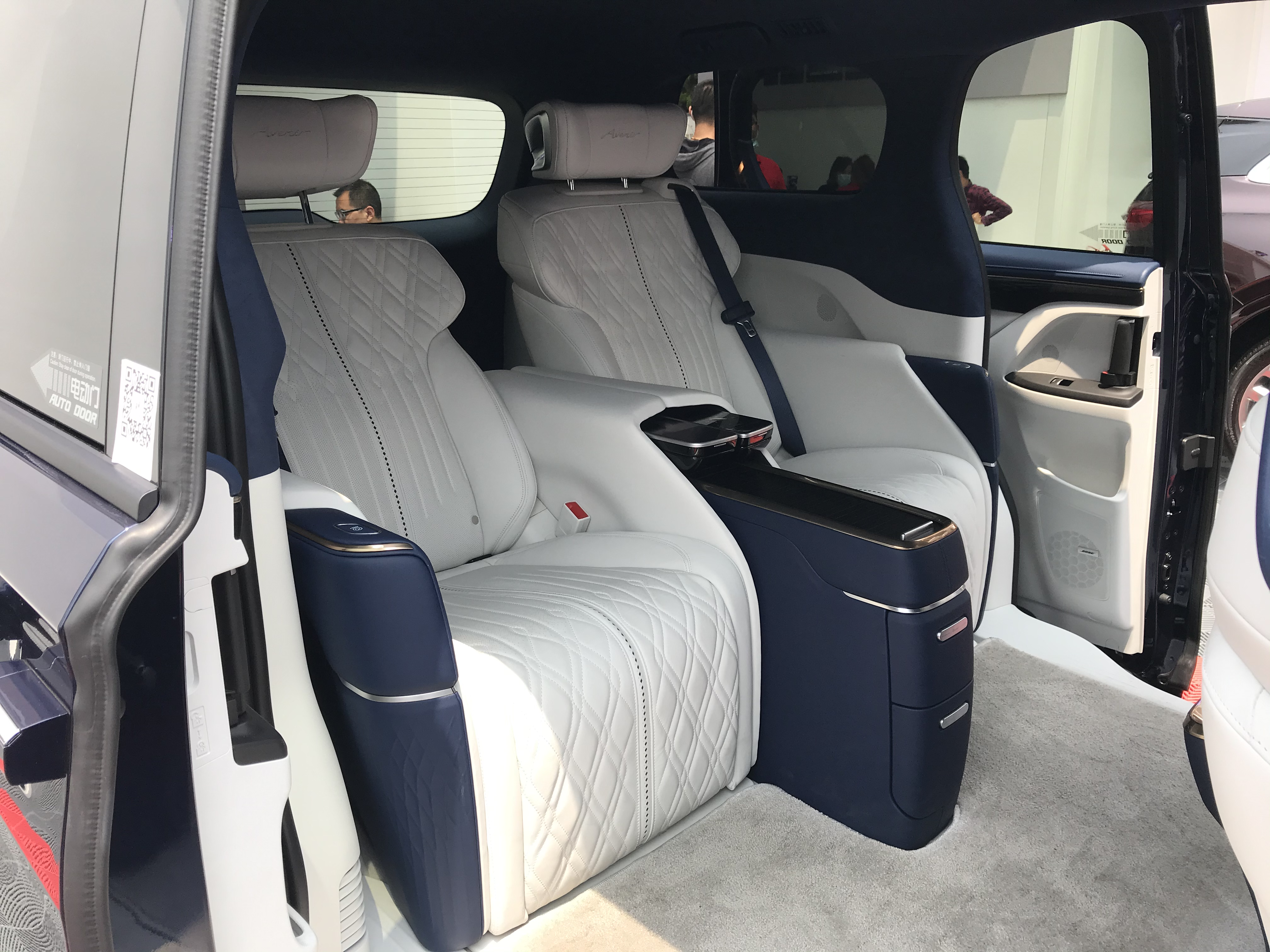
Buick GL8 Avenir 4 seats interior

=== 2022 facelift ===
The GL8 ES and Avenir received another facelift in 2022 launched alongside the Flagship Century (fourth generation) and the 2022 facelifted GL8 Legacy (second generation). The engine was updated to the LXH model, which is an updated version of the previous 2.0-liter LSY mild hybrid engine modified to meet China 6b emissions standards.

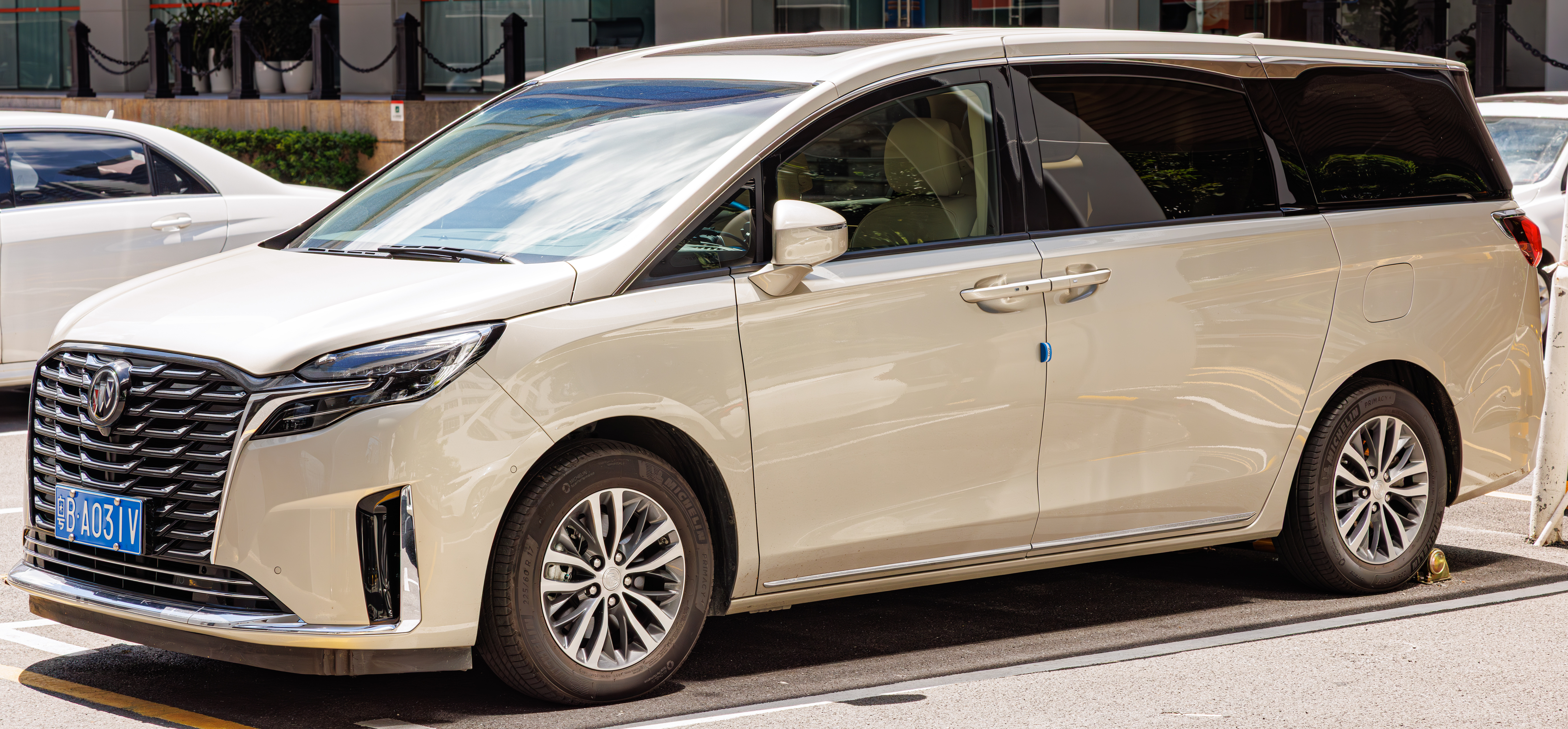
2022 Buick GL8 ES Lu Zun

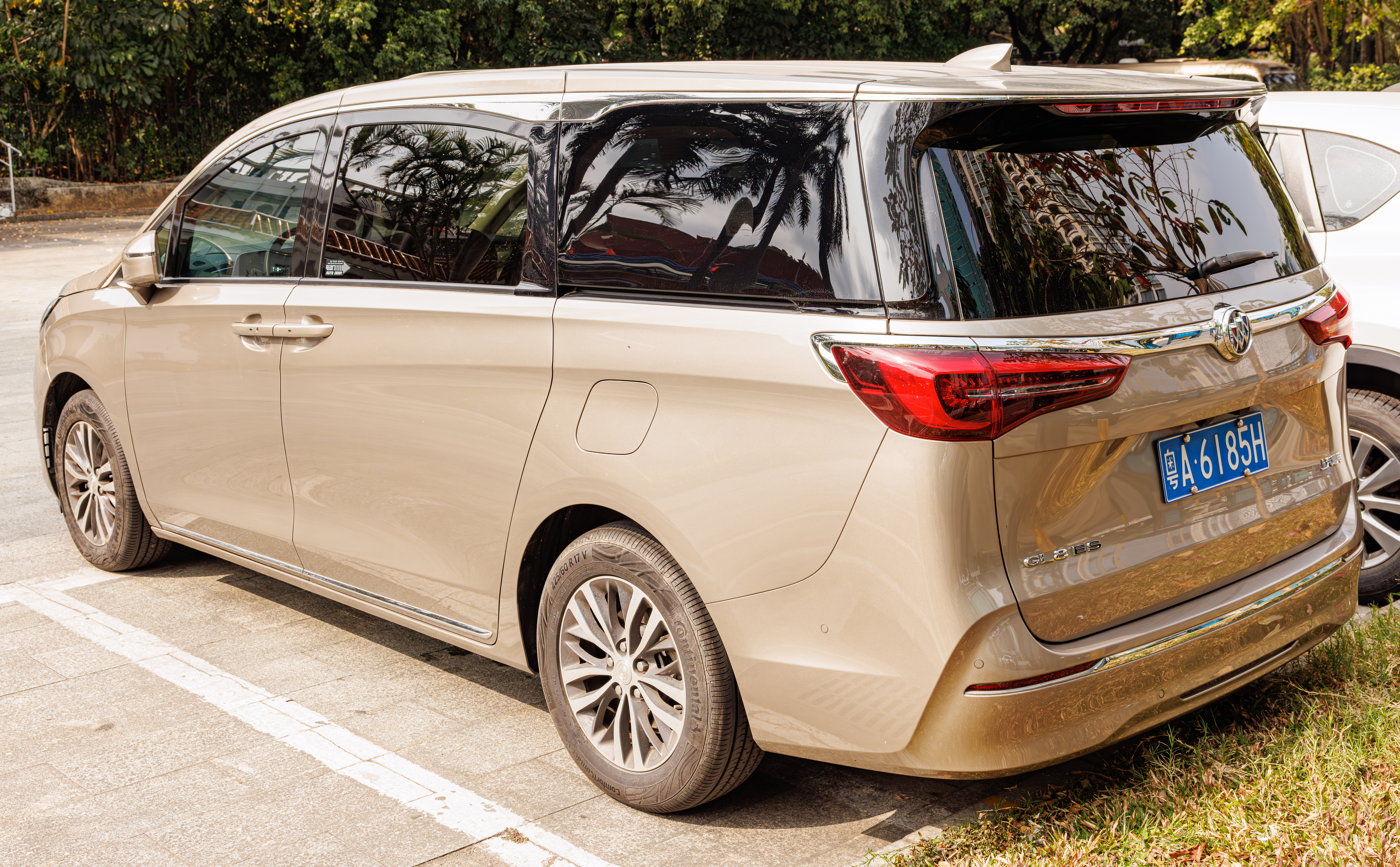
2022 Buick GL8 ES Lu Zun

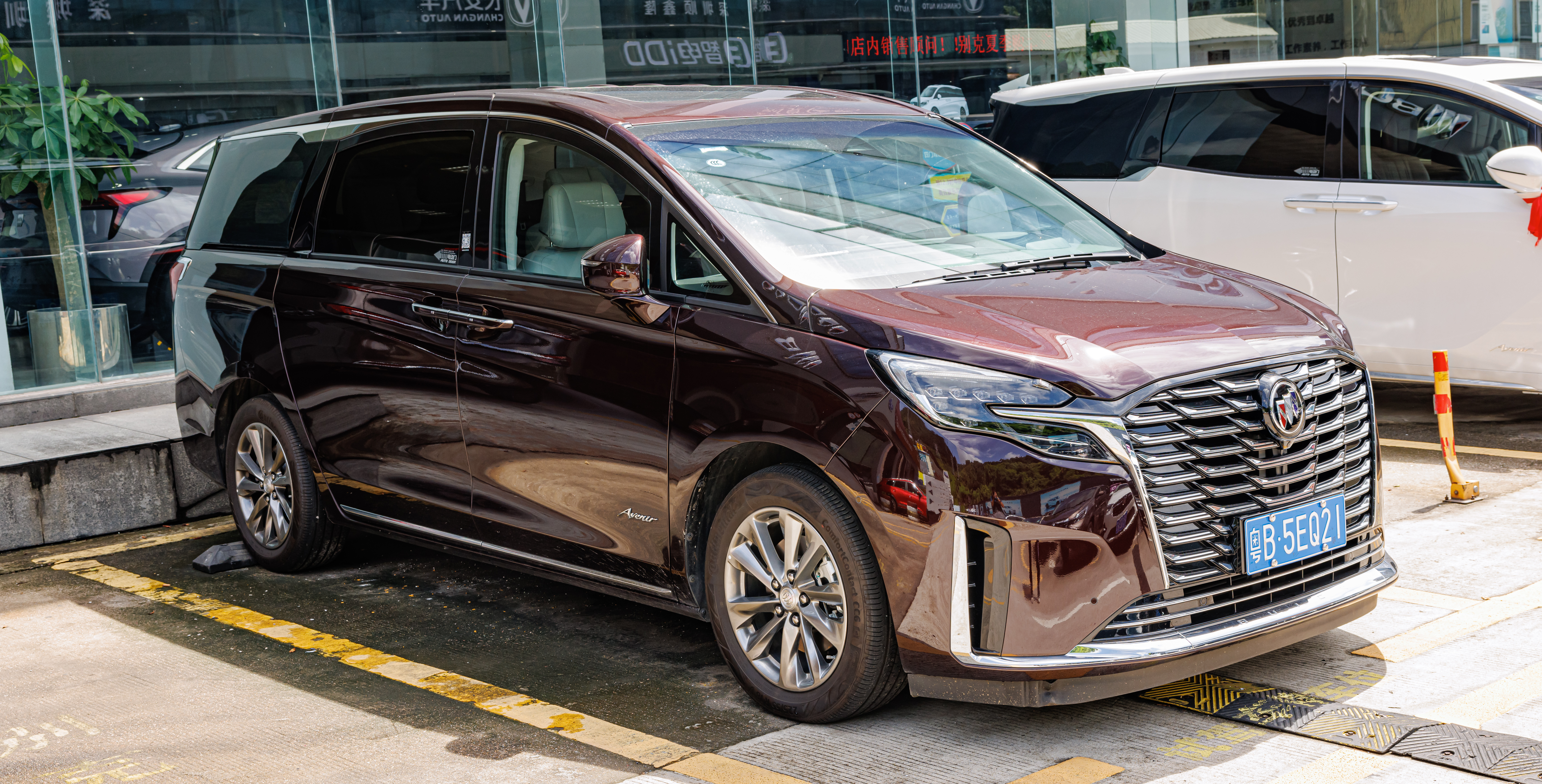
2022 Buick GL8 Avenir

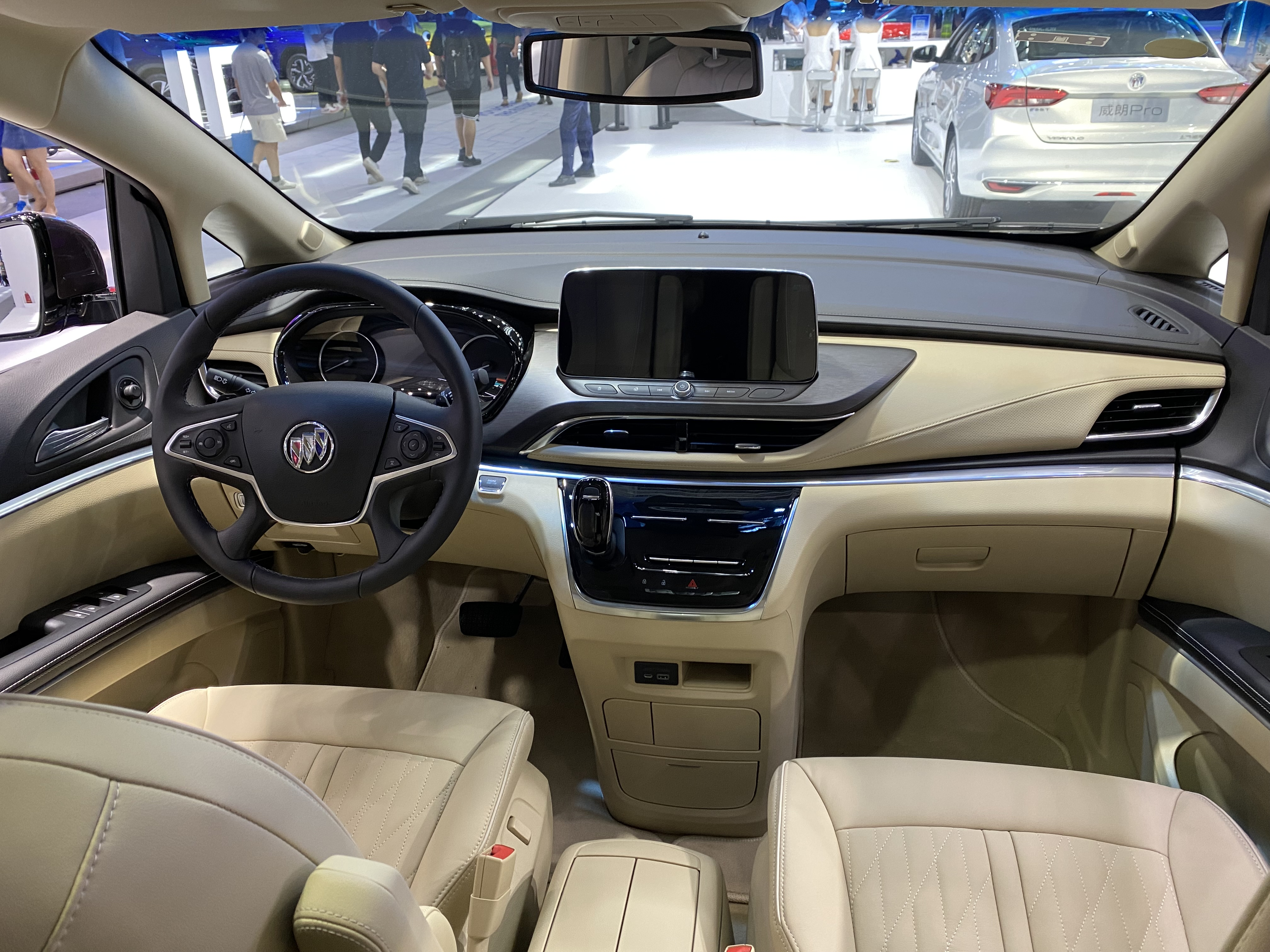
Interior

=== GL8 Lu Zun facelift (2024) ===
In April 2024, the GL8 Lu Zun PHEV (Chinese: 陆尊; pinyin: Lù zūn; lit. 'Land First Class') was released on "Buick Brand Day" as a refreshed model that replaces the old Avenir trim. It is available with Buick's new Zhenlong plug-in hybrid system, which includes a fully self-developed plug-in hybrid electric drive unit developed by the Pan Asia Technical Automotive Center, a 24.4 kWh LFP Ultium battery, a hybrid-specific 1.5-litre turbocharged hybrid engine using a deep Miller cycle producing 127 kW (170 hp; 173 PS), and a 74 kW (99 hp; 101 PS) motor driving the front wheels. It has an electric range of 138 km (86 mi) on the CLTC cycle, and the comprehensive cruising range reaches 1,370 km (850 mi). In October 2024, the mild hybrid version of the GL8 ES Lu Zun facelift was launched, using the LXH 2.0-liter engine and 48-volt hybrid system used in previous models. This version also receives a different grille pattern compared to the PHEV variant.

In July 2025, after the launch of the lower priced Lu Shang PHEV, the Lu Zun PHEV had its powertrain upgraded and is referred to as Zhenlong Pro. The battery has been upgraded to a 34.8 kWh NMC pack, now providing 202 km (126 mi) of CLTC range. Buick says the new battery is capable of 5C peak charging rates, and is capable of charging from 30–80% in 15 minutes. Additionally, higher Lu Zun PHEV models started receiving Avenir badging, and received features such as Navigate-On-Pilot (NOP) L2 ADAS system with automatic self-parking and a heads-up display.

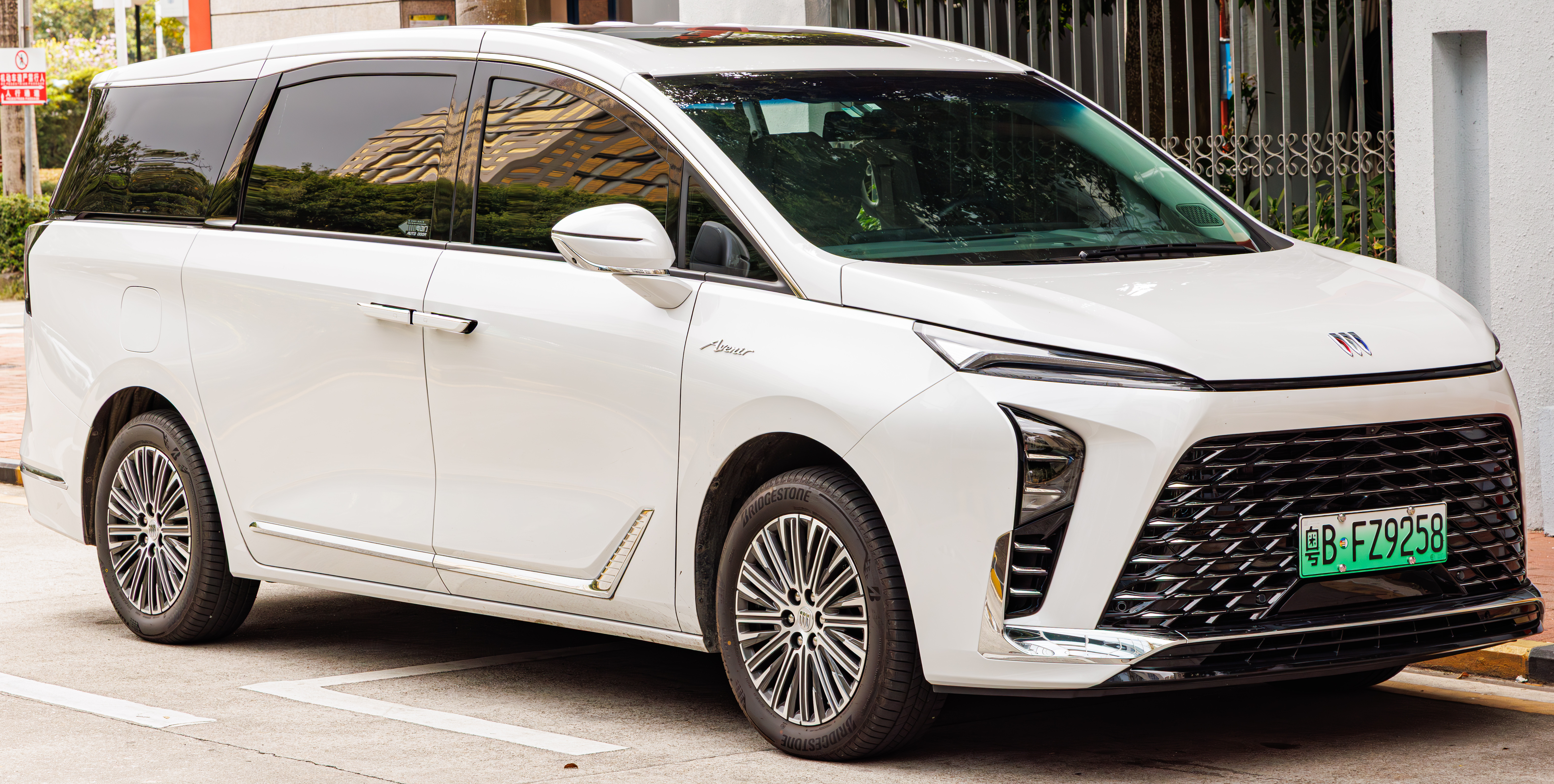
2024 Buick GL8 Lu Zun PHEV

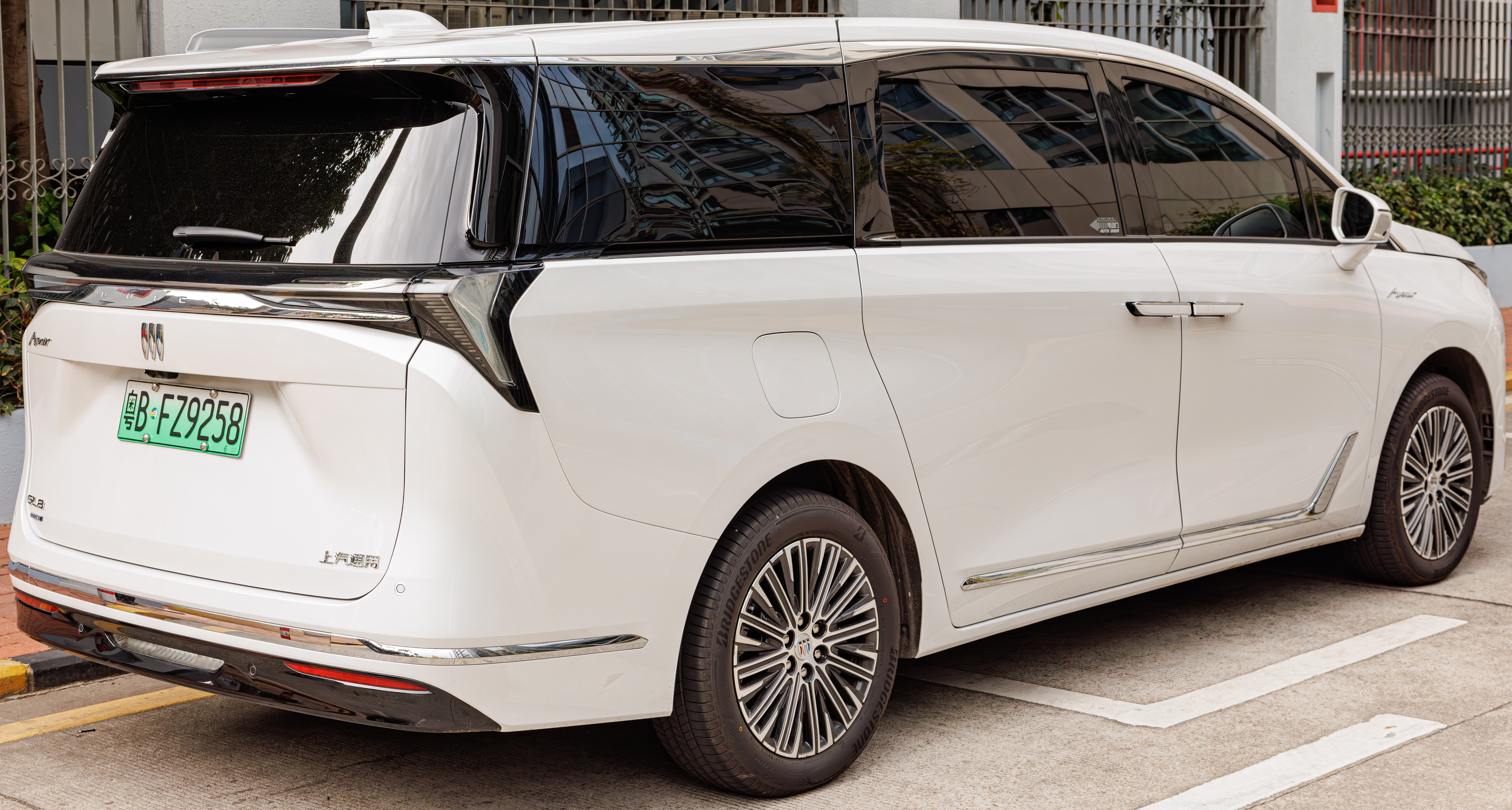
Rear view

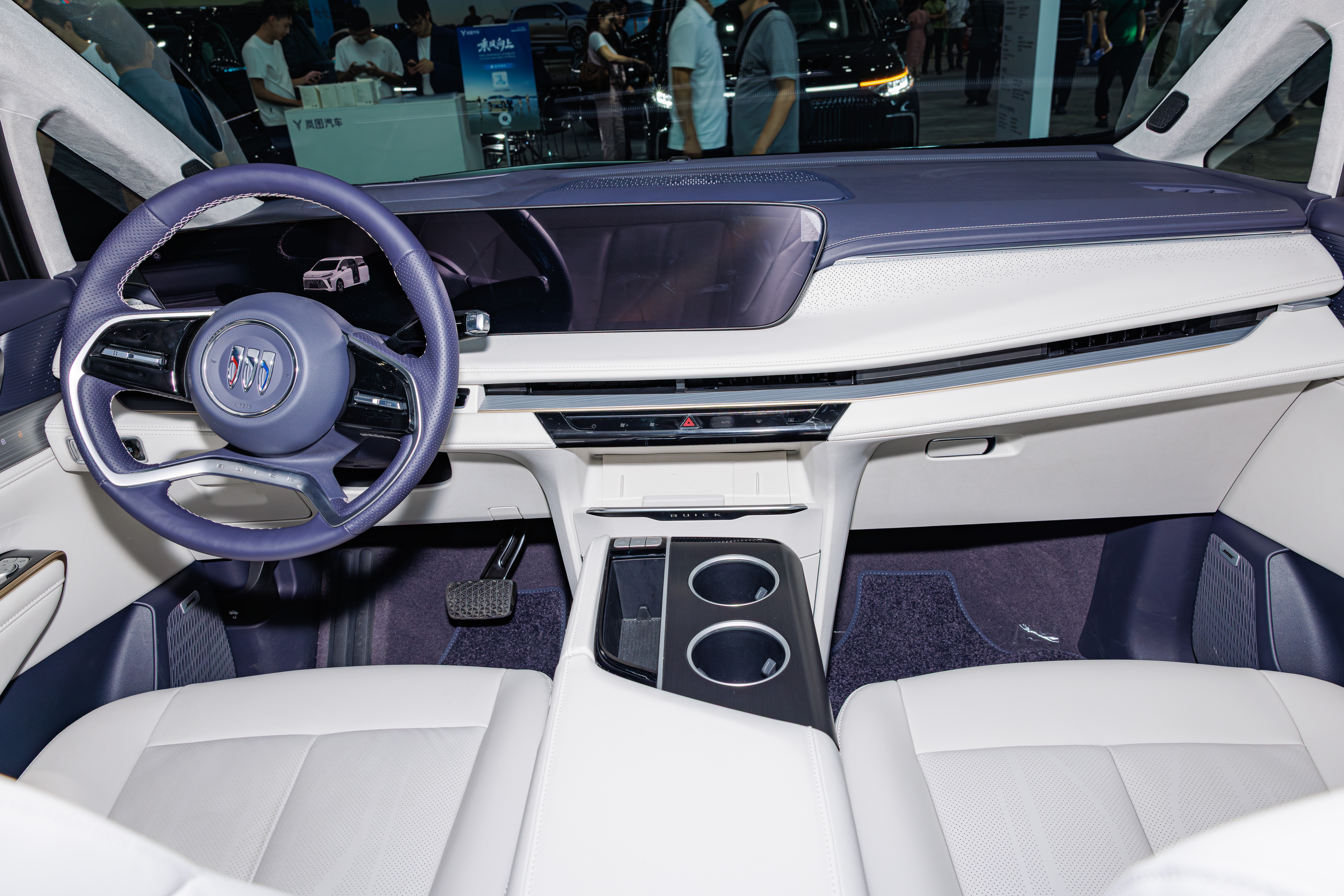
2024 Buick GL8 Lu Zun PHEV Interior
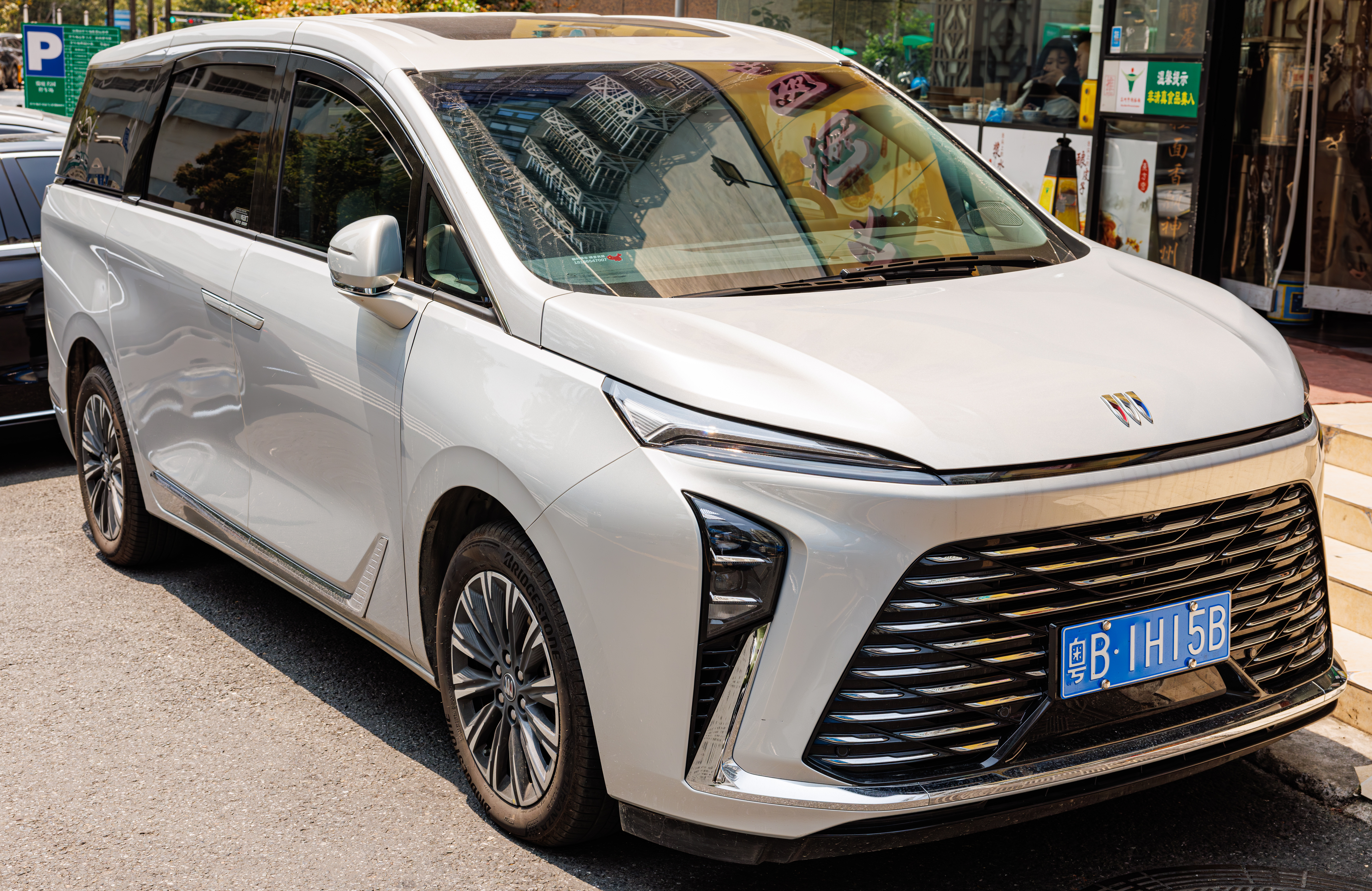
2024 Buick GL8 ES Lu Zun

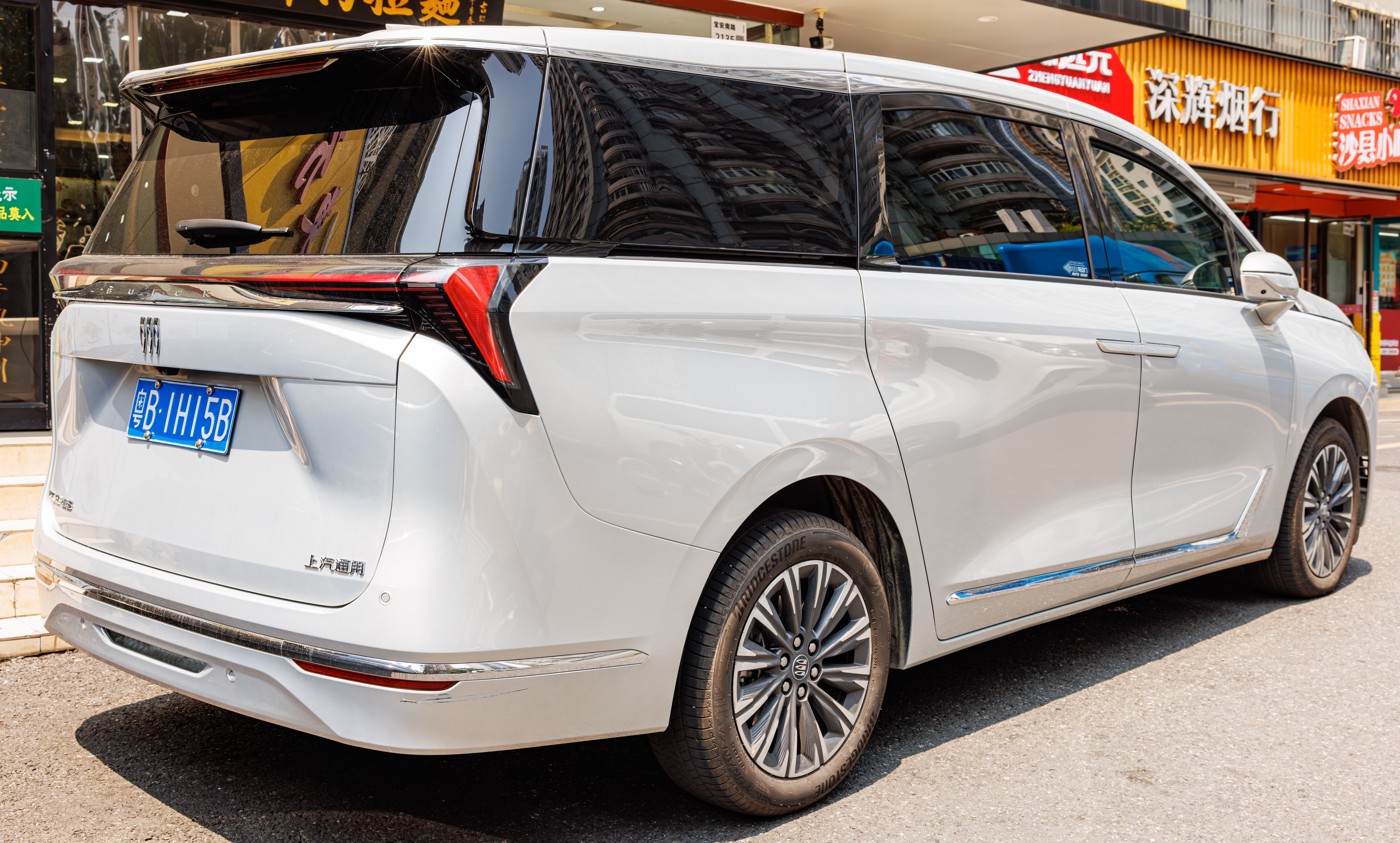
Rear view

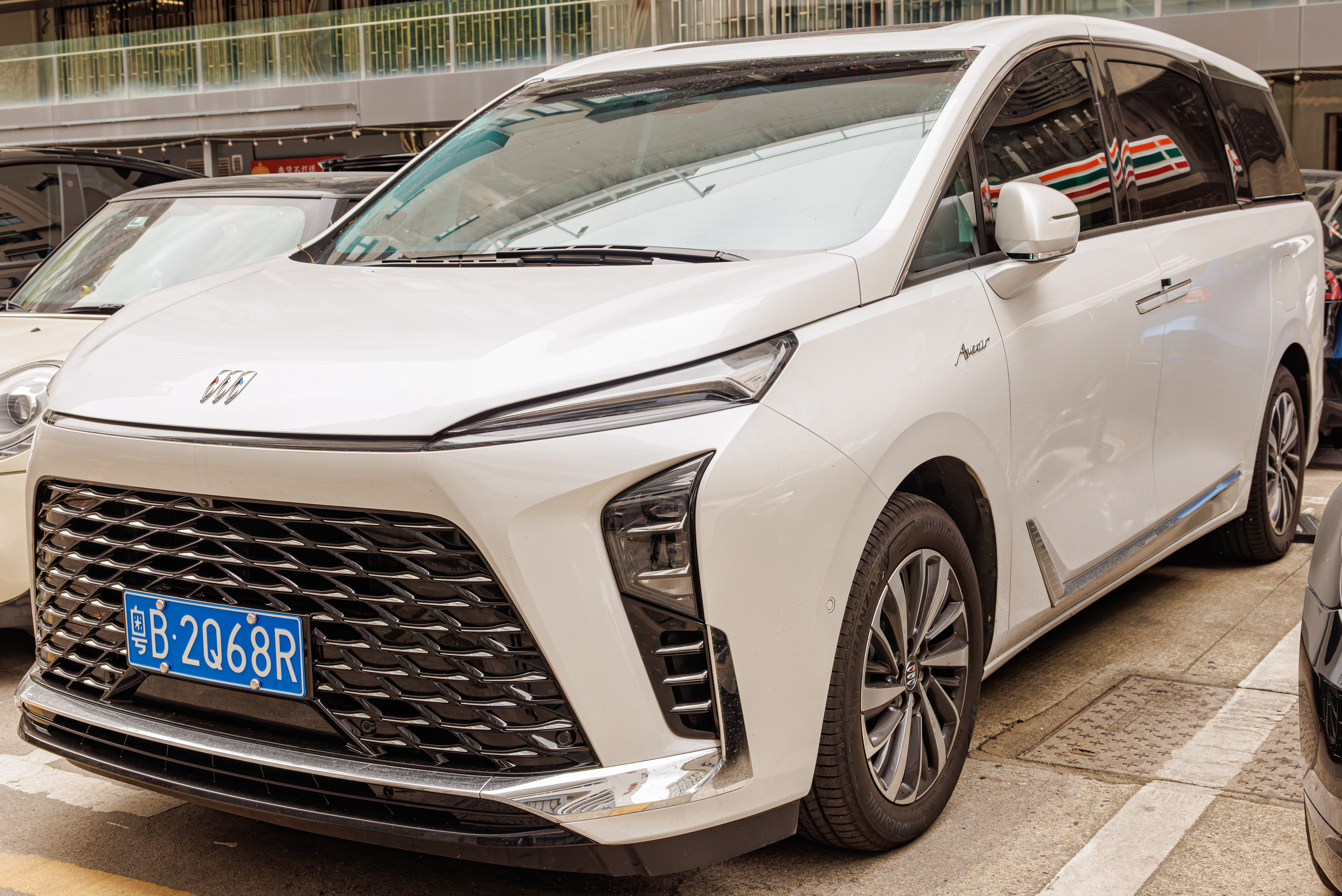
2024 Buick GL8 ES Lu Zun Avenir

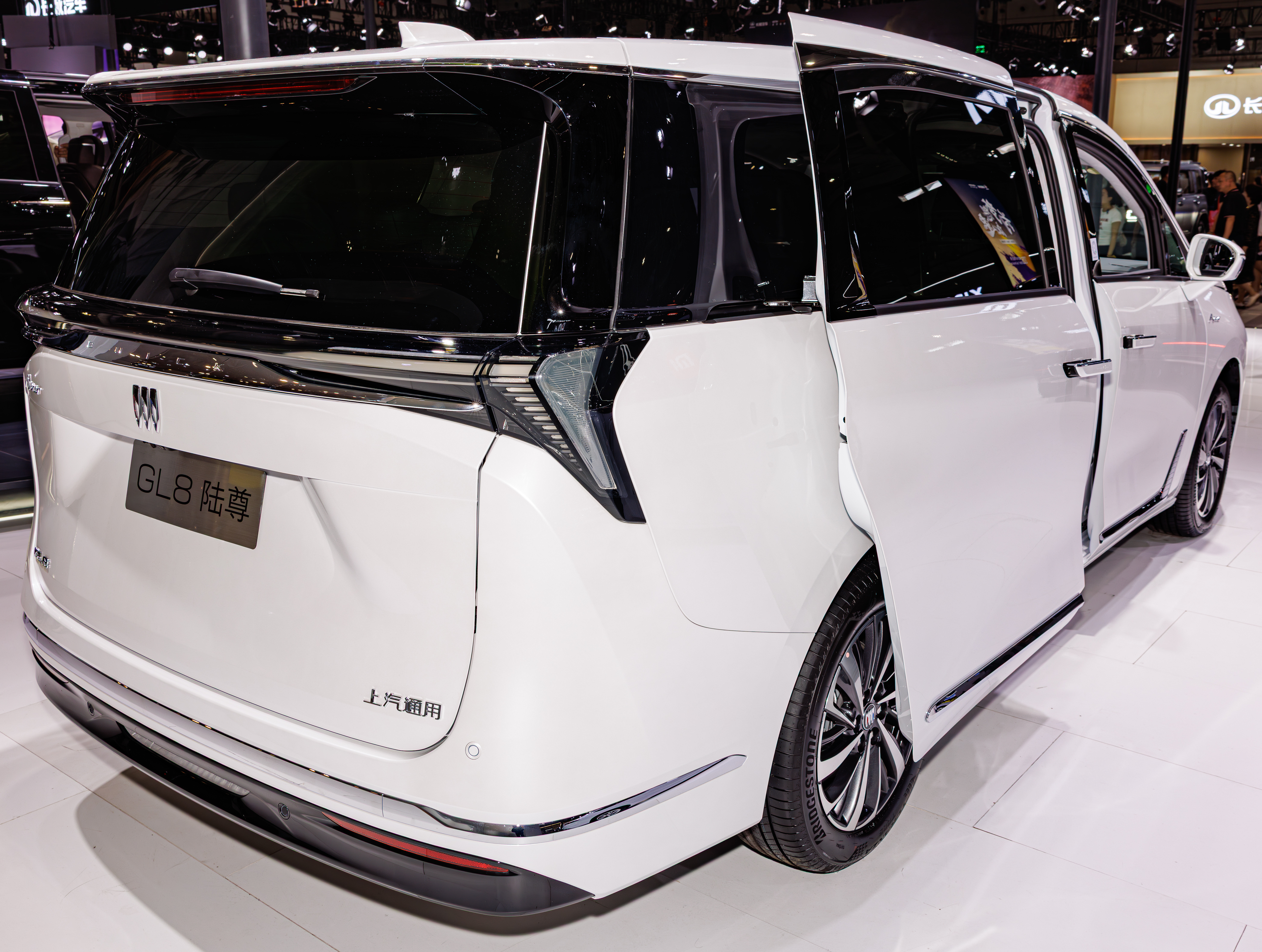
Rear view

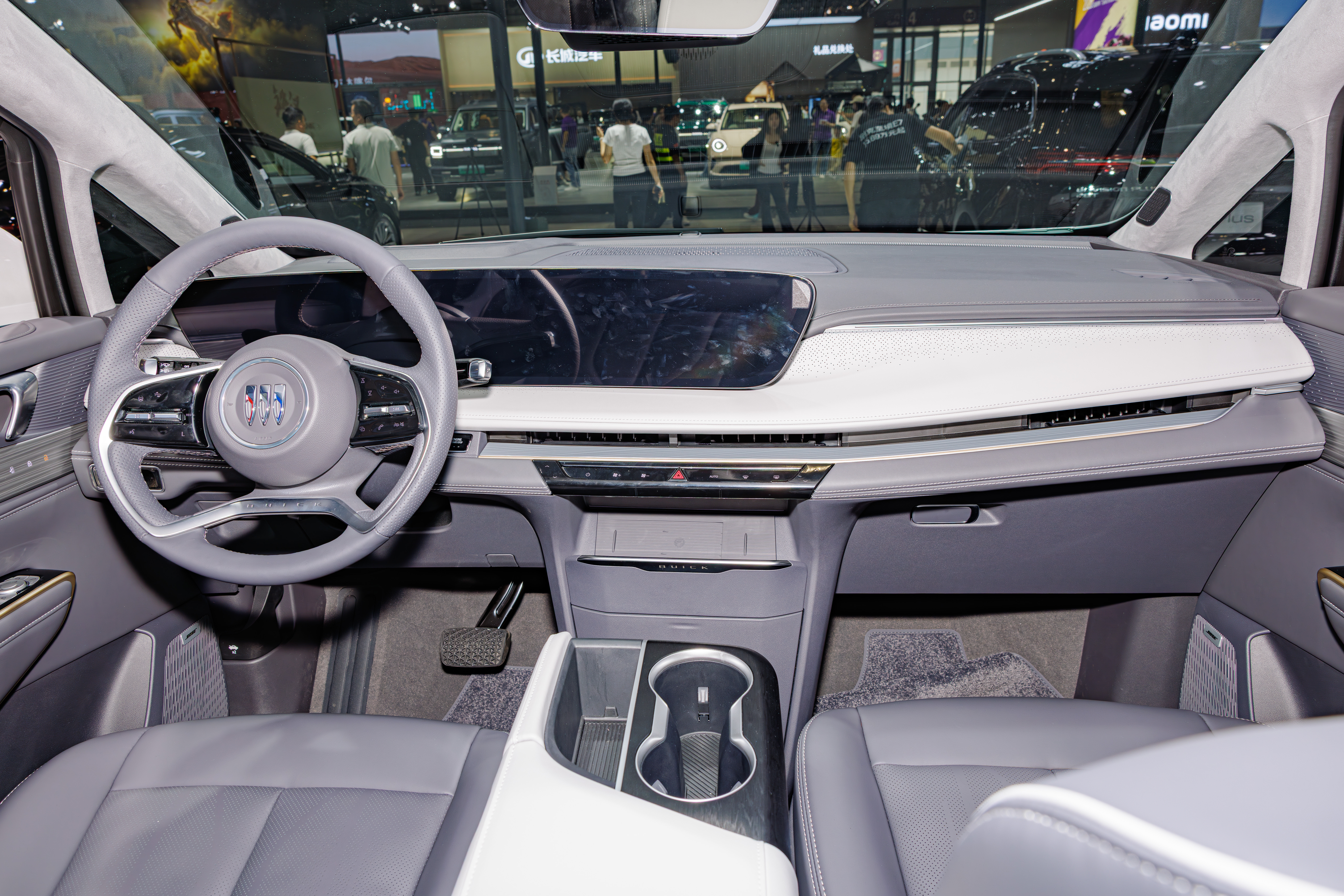
2024 Buick GL8 ES Lu Zun Avenir Interior

=== GL8 Lu Shang (2025) ===
In March 2025, Buick released preview images of a lower priced version of the Lu Zun plug-in hybrid called the GL8 Lu Shang (Chinese: GL8陆尚; pinyin: GL8 lùshàng; lit. 'GL8 Onshore Business'). It was launched on April 11, 2025, initially with the PHEV powertrain only, and features minor changes to the exterior styling while most panels stay similar to the original 2016 model, including unified headlight units rather than a split-headlight design and individual taillights rather than a light bar design. The mild hybrid version of the GL8 Lu Shang was launched on June 26, 2025. Due to the discontinuation of the GL8 Legacy in February 2025, the Lu Shang is the new entry point into the GL8 series below the Lu Zun and Century.

At launch, it was available with the same two powertrain options as the GL8 Lu Zun. The GL8 Lu Shang is powered by a 392 hp (292 kW; 397 PS) 1.5-liter turbocharged plug-in hybrid system consisting of a two-speed hybrid transmission and two motors powered by a 24.4 kWh LFP battery pack providing a 142-kilometre (88 mi) CLTC range rating, for a combined range of 1,420 km (880 mi). The standard version continues to be powered by a 2.0-liter turbocharged 48-volt mild hybrid engine. In late 2025, a lower priced variant with the mild hybrid system and several other features removed was introduced.

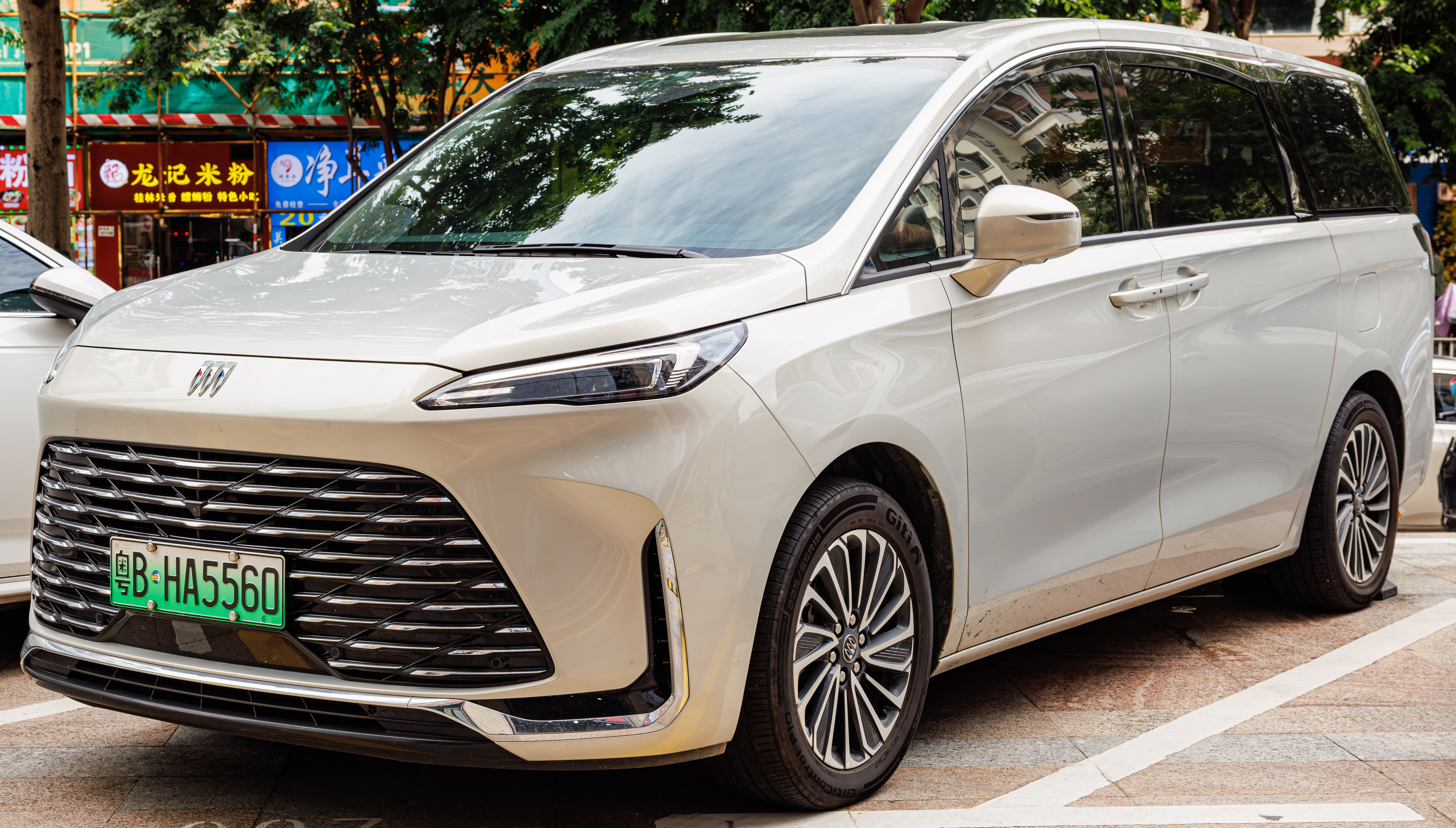
2025 Buick GL8 Lu Shang PHEV

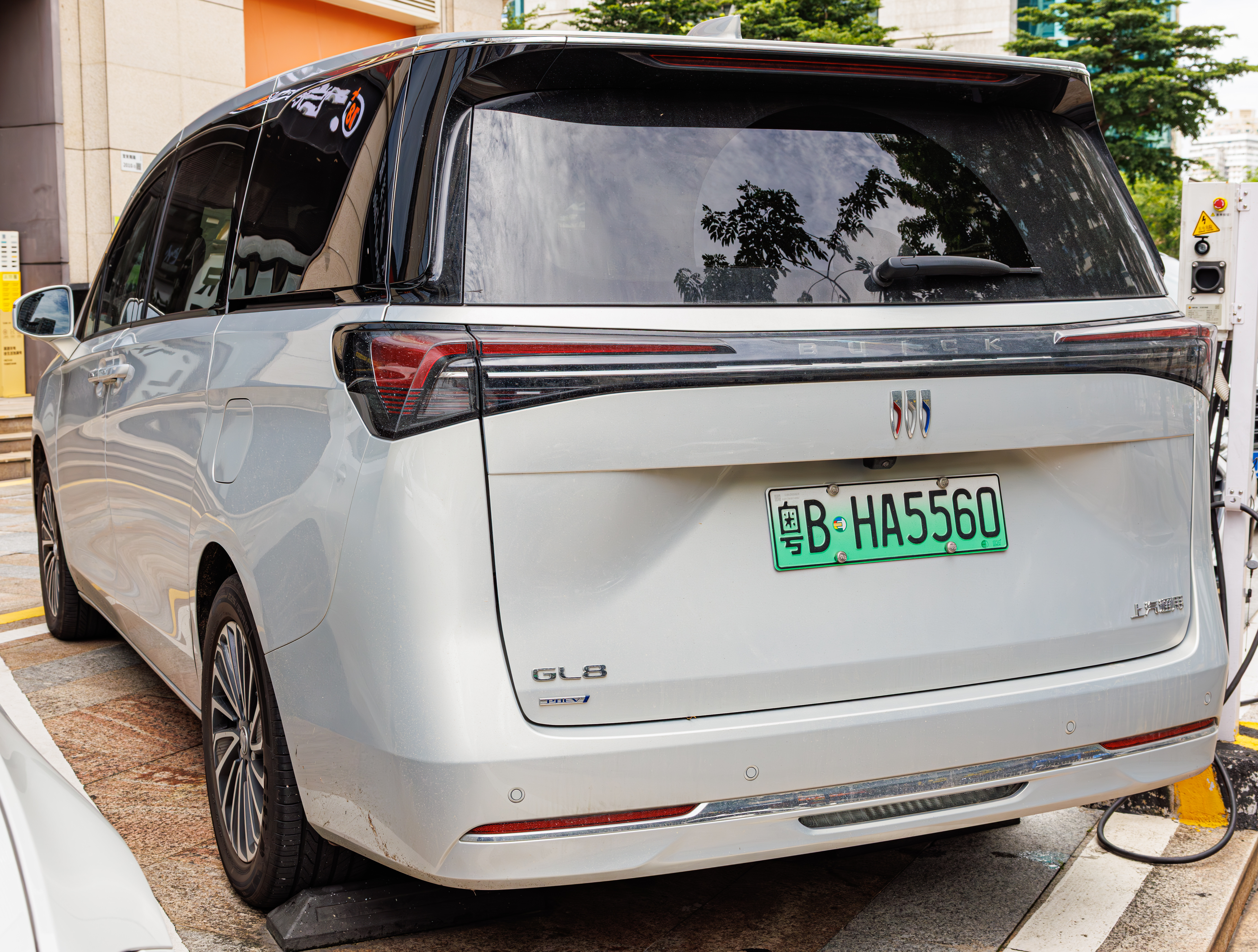
Rear view

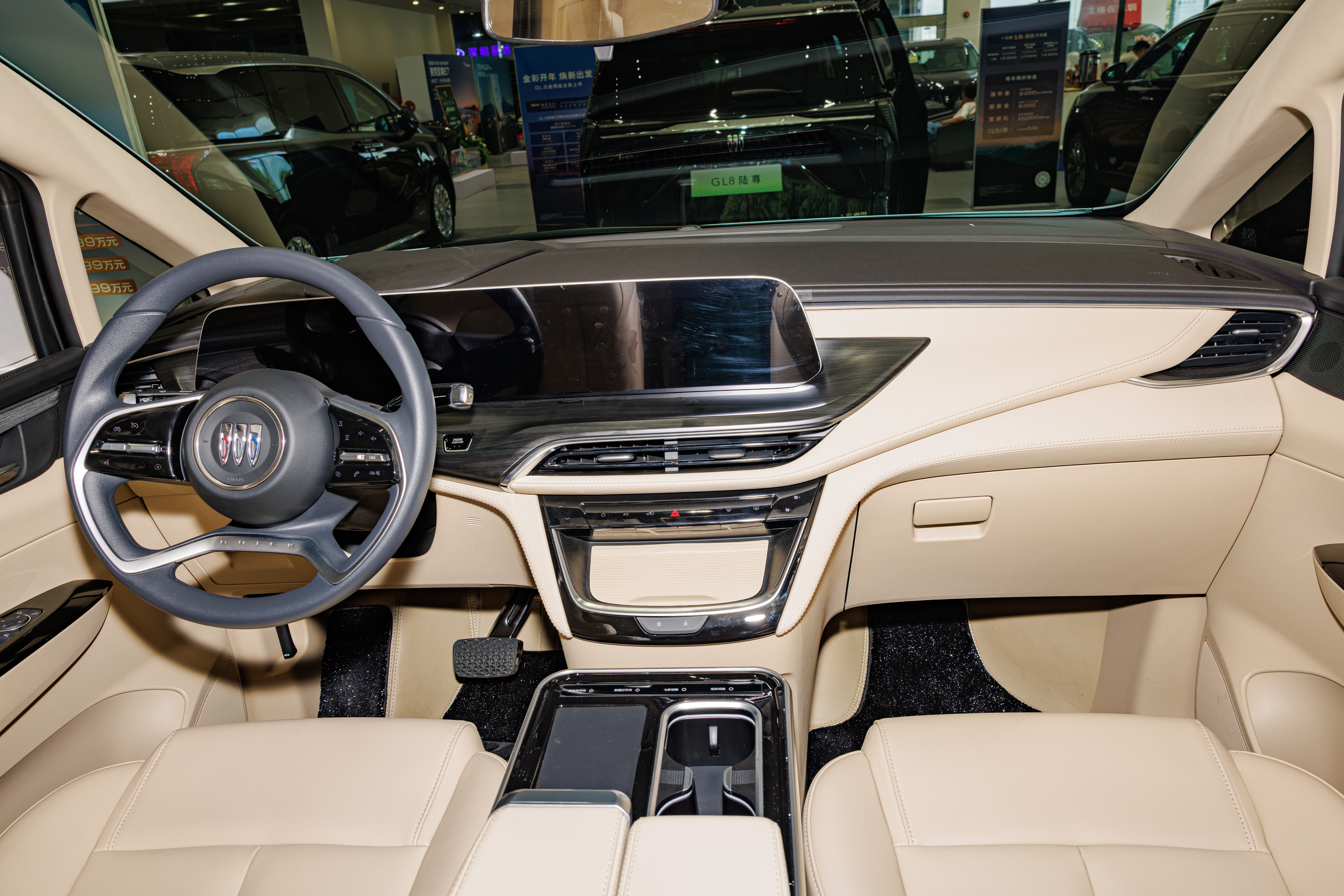
Interior
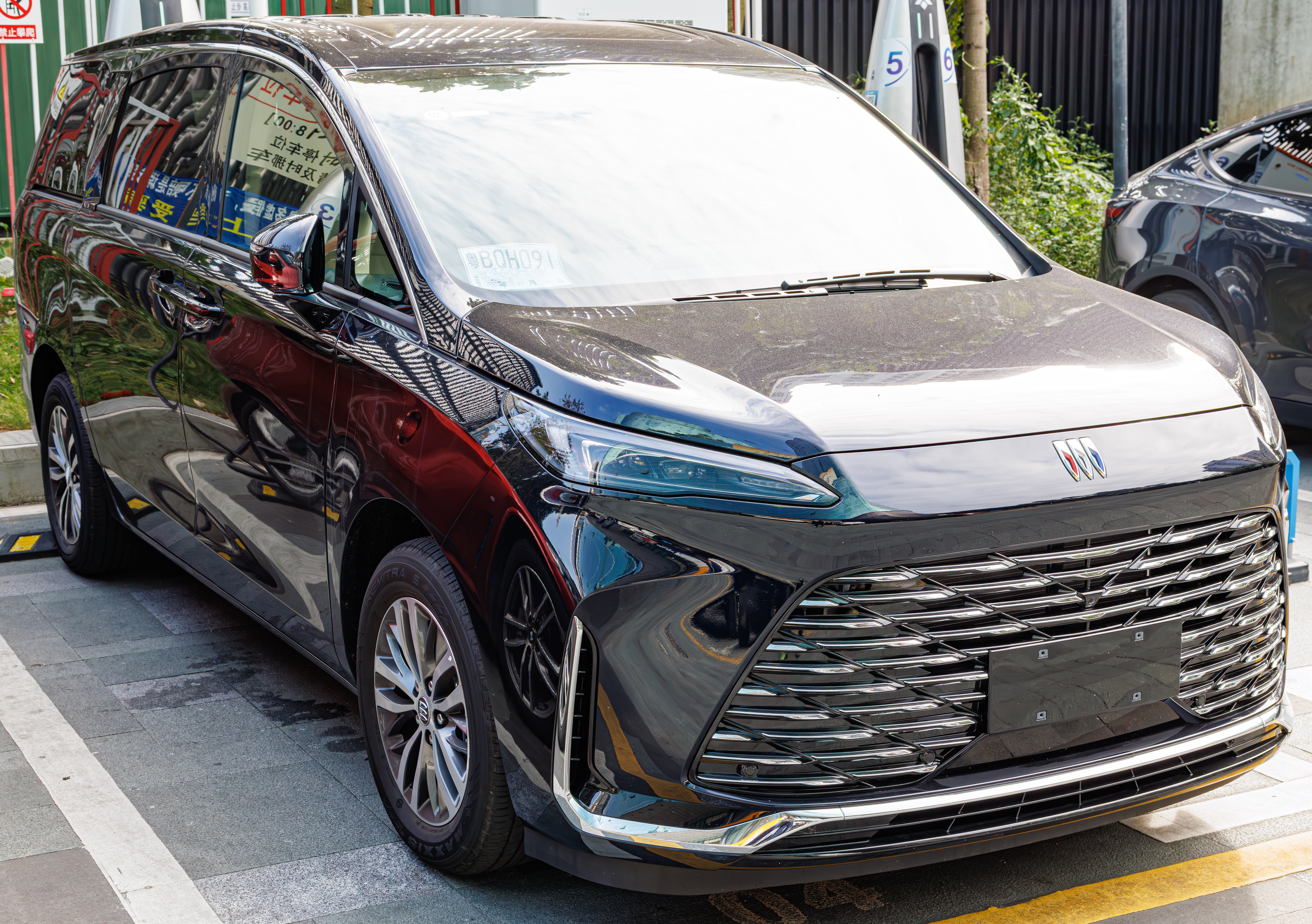
2025 Buick GL8 mild hybrid

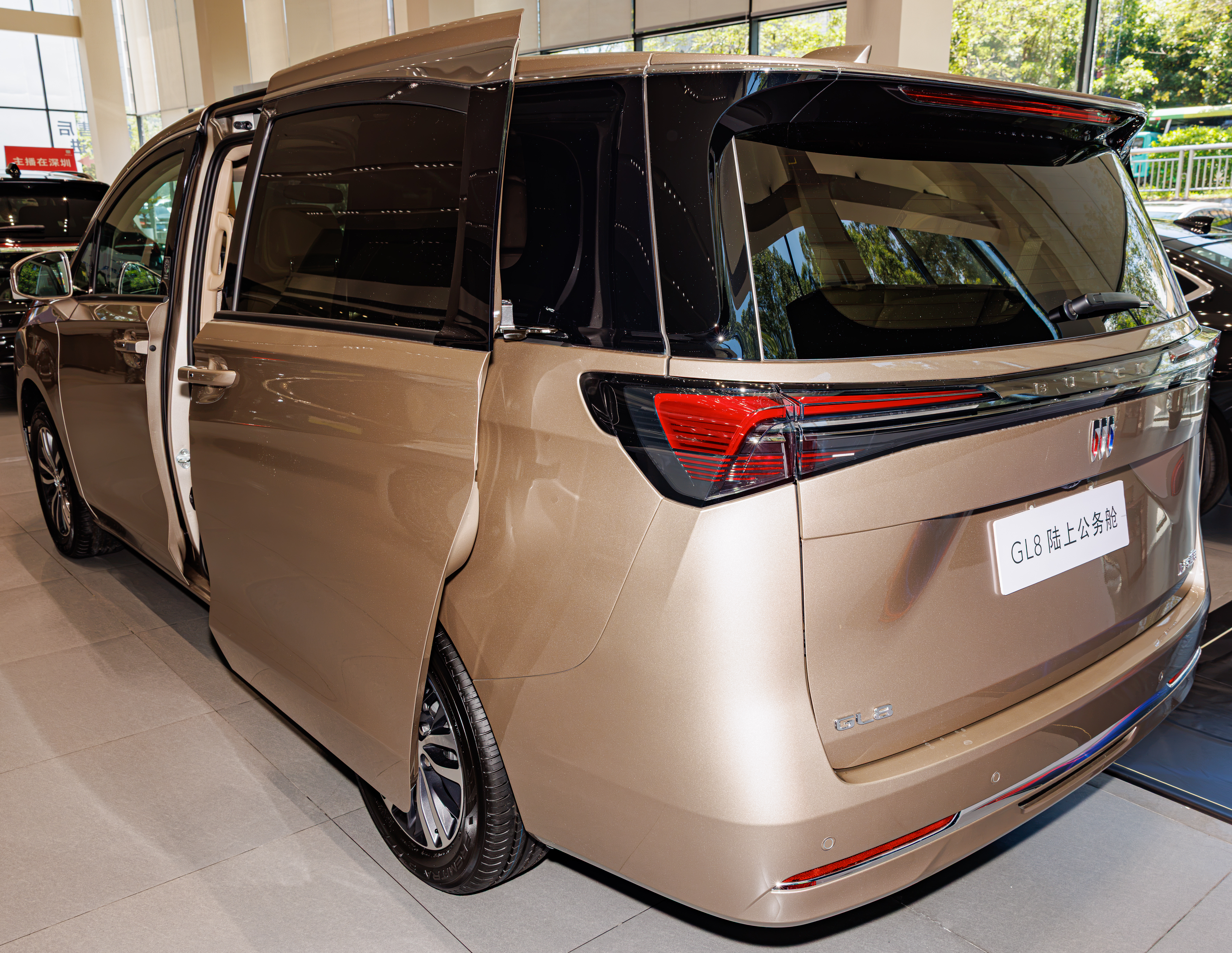
Rear view

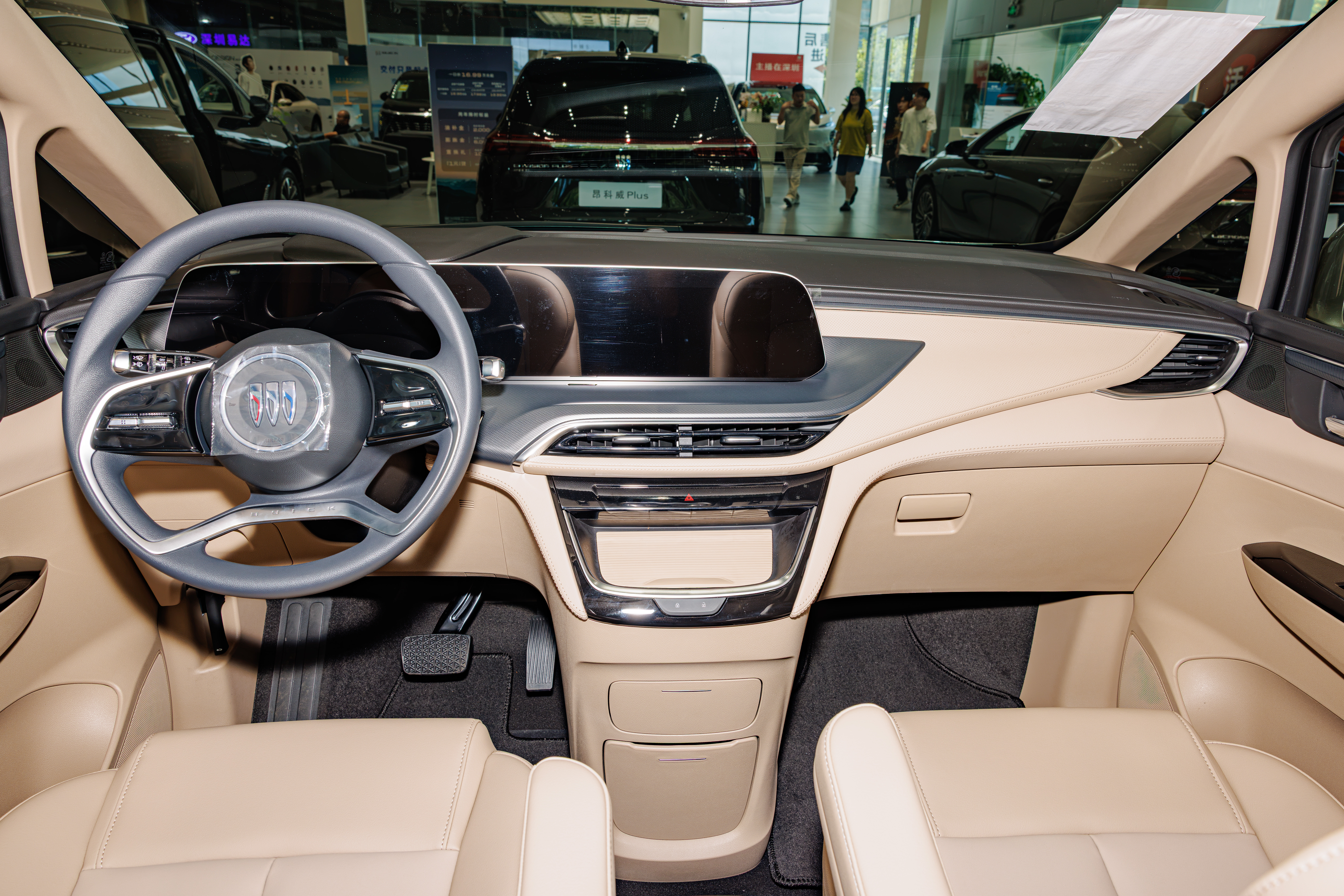
Interior

== Century (2022) ==
Century
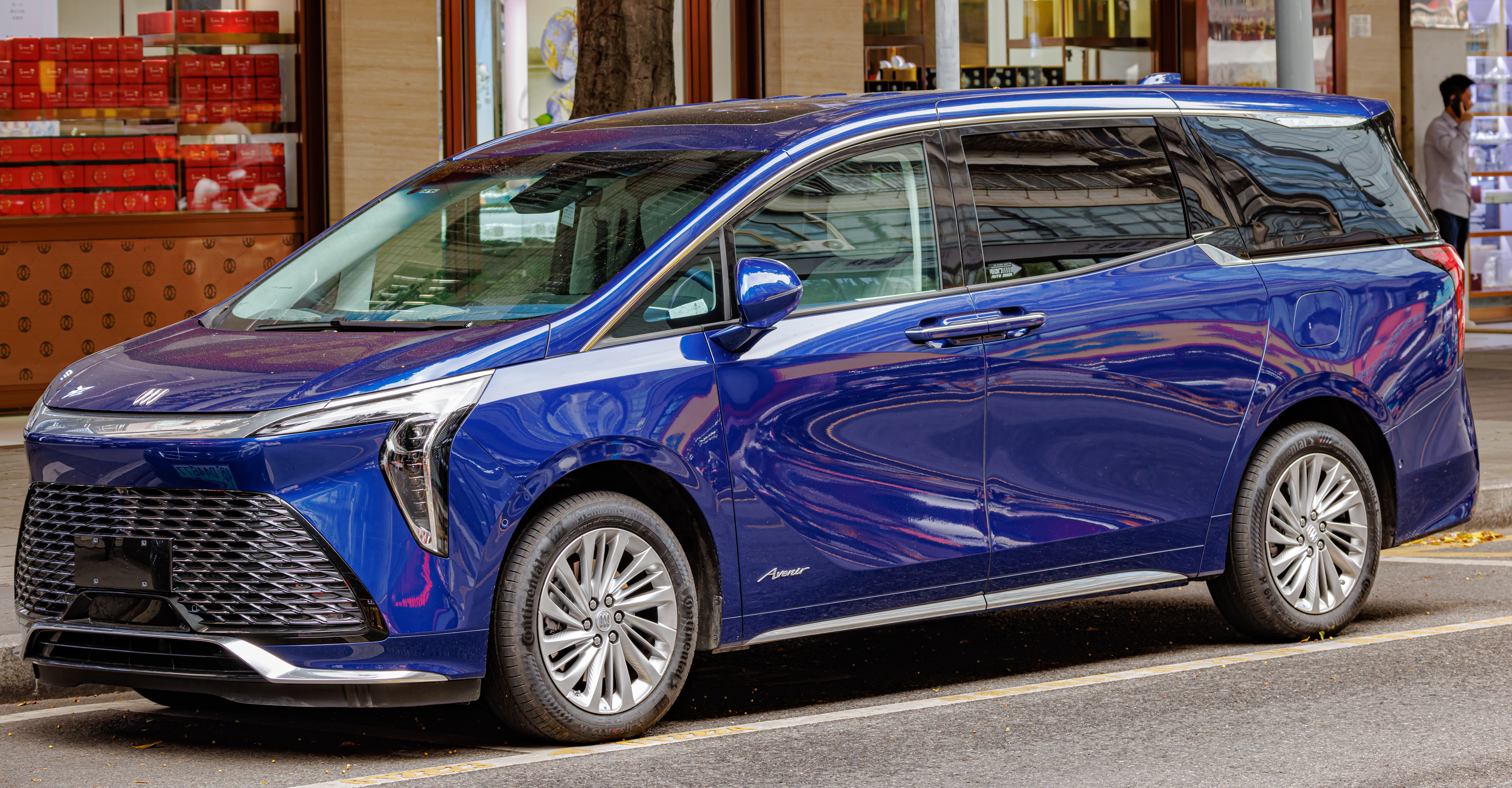

Overview
- Also called: Buick GL8 Century
- Production: 2022–present
- Assembly: China: Jinqiao, Shanghai (SAIC-GM)

Body and chassis
- Body style: 5-door minivan
- Platform: GM VSS-F (SGM458)

Powertrain
- Engine: 2.0 L LSV turbo Mild Hybrid 48V I4
- Transmission: 9-speed 9T50 Hydramatic automatic

Dimensions
- Wheelbase: 3,130 mm (123.2 in)
- Length: 5,230 mm (205.9 in)
- Width: 1,980 mm (78.0 in)
- Height: 1,867 mm (73.5 in)

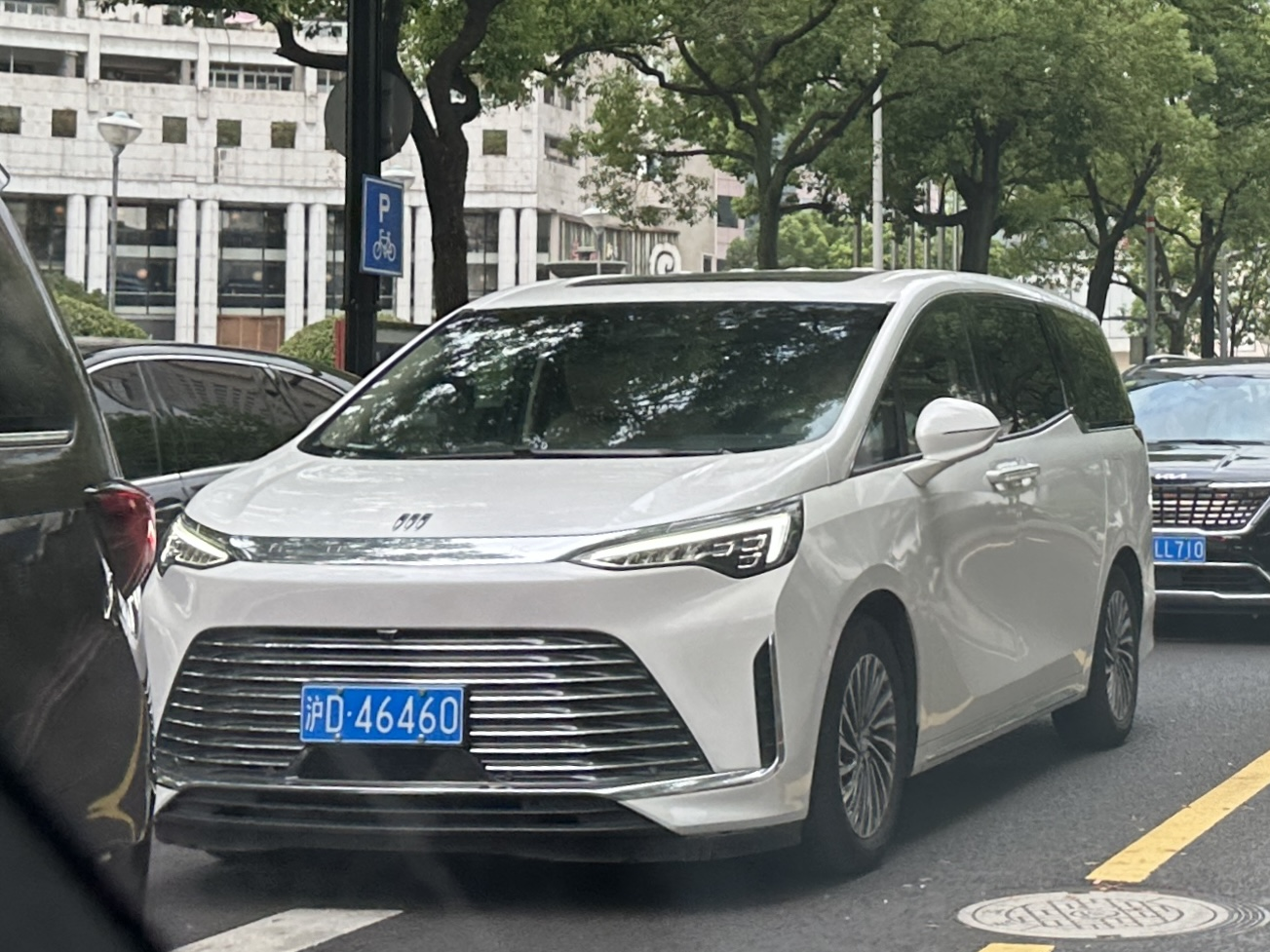
Buick Century front

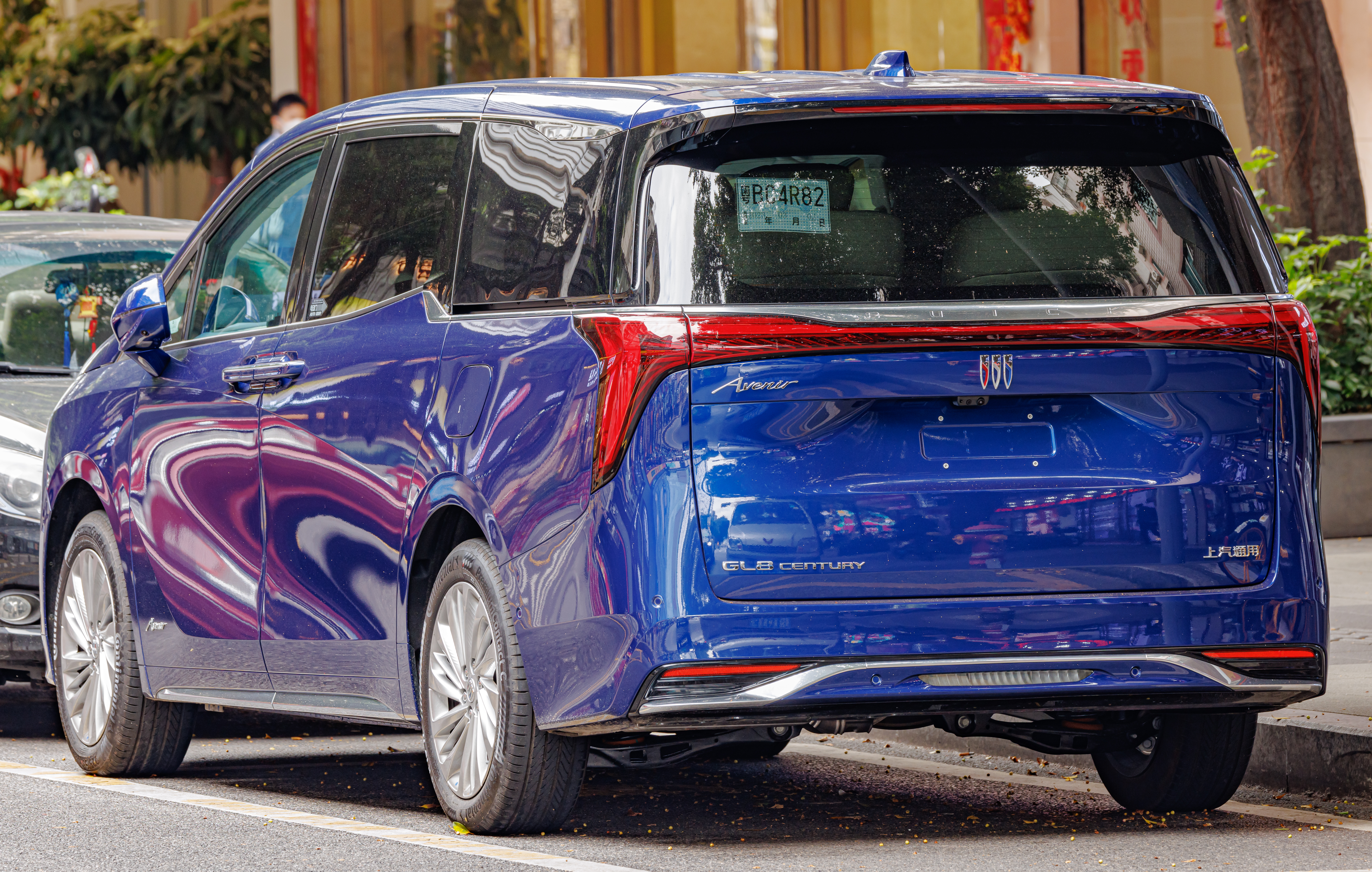
Buick Century Avenir rear

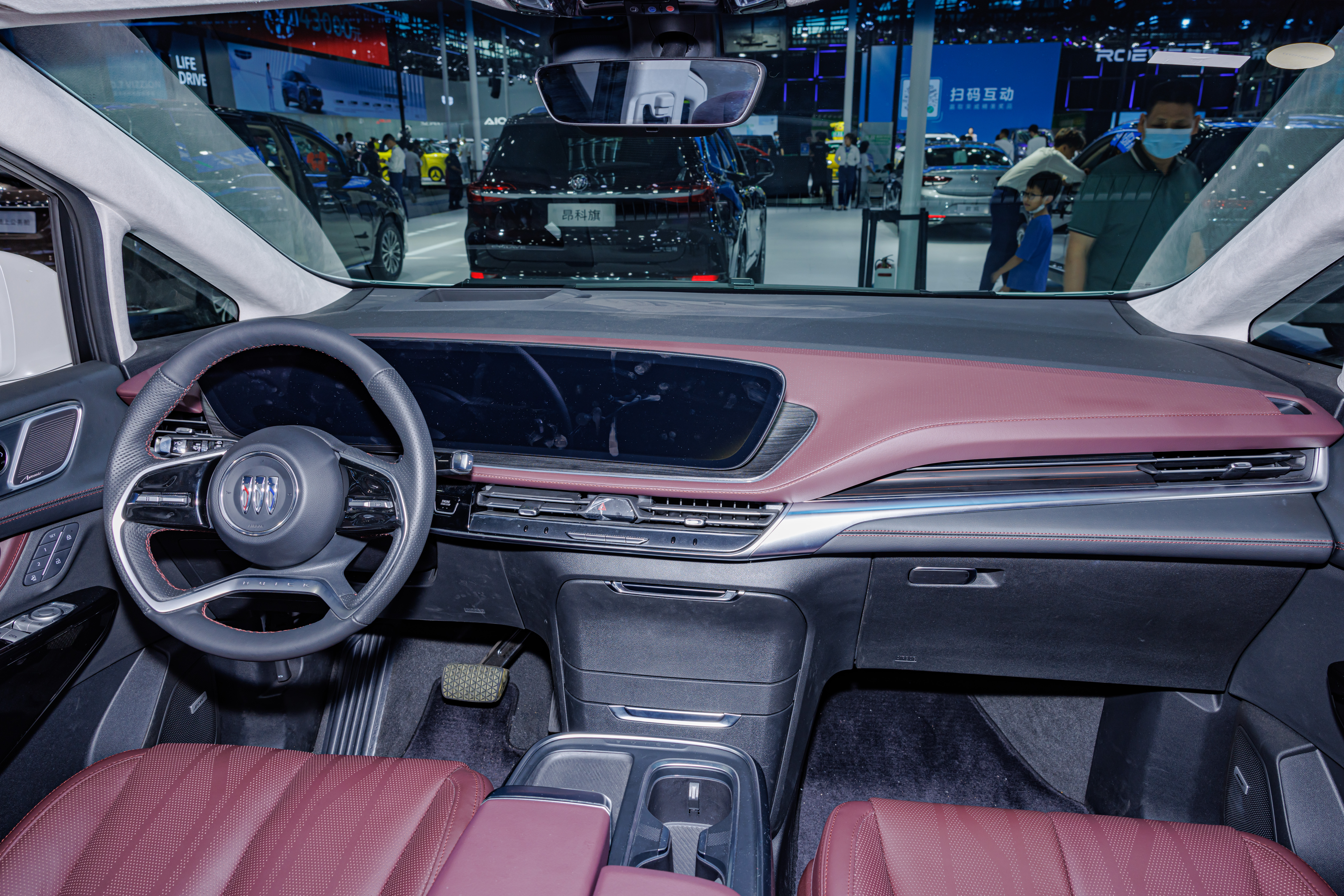
Buick Century Avenir interior
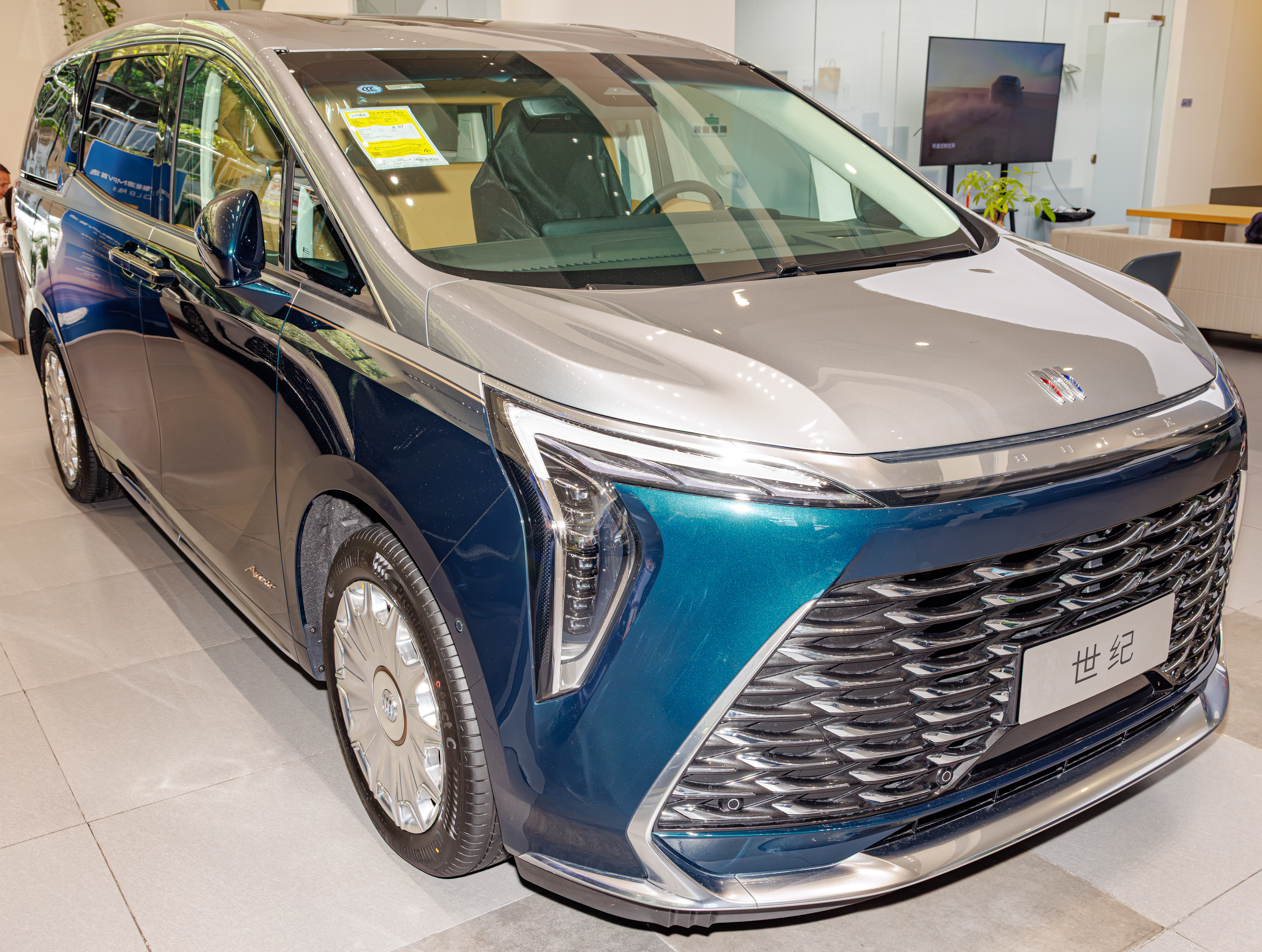
Buick Century Avenir (Facelift)

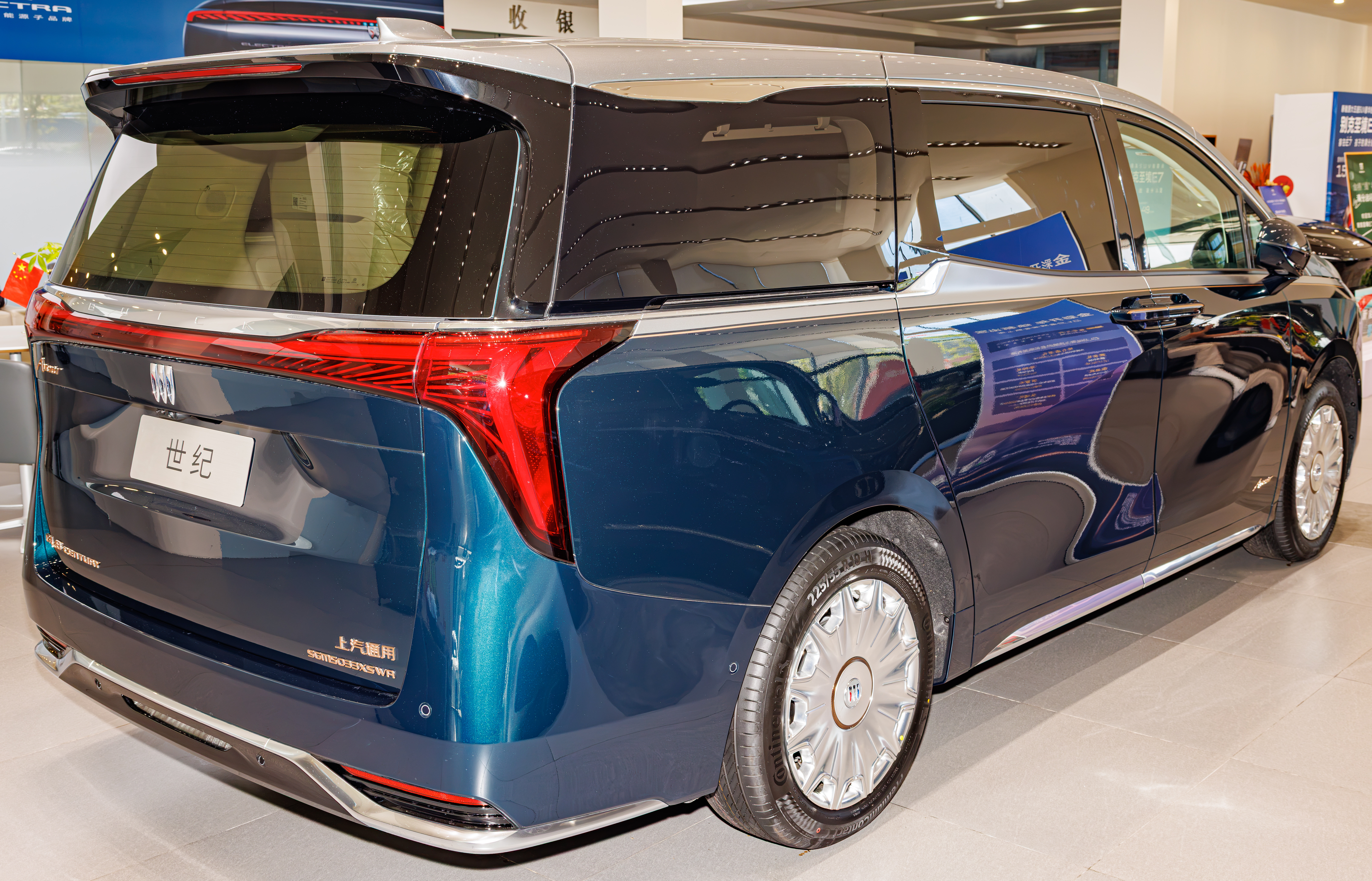
Buick Century Avenir (Facelift; rear)

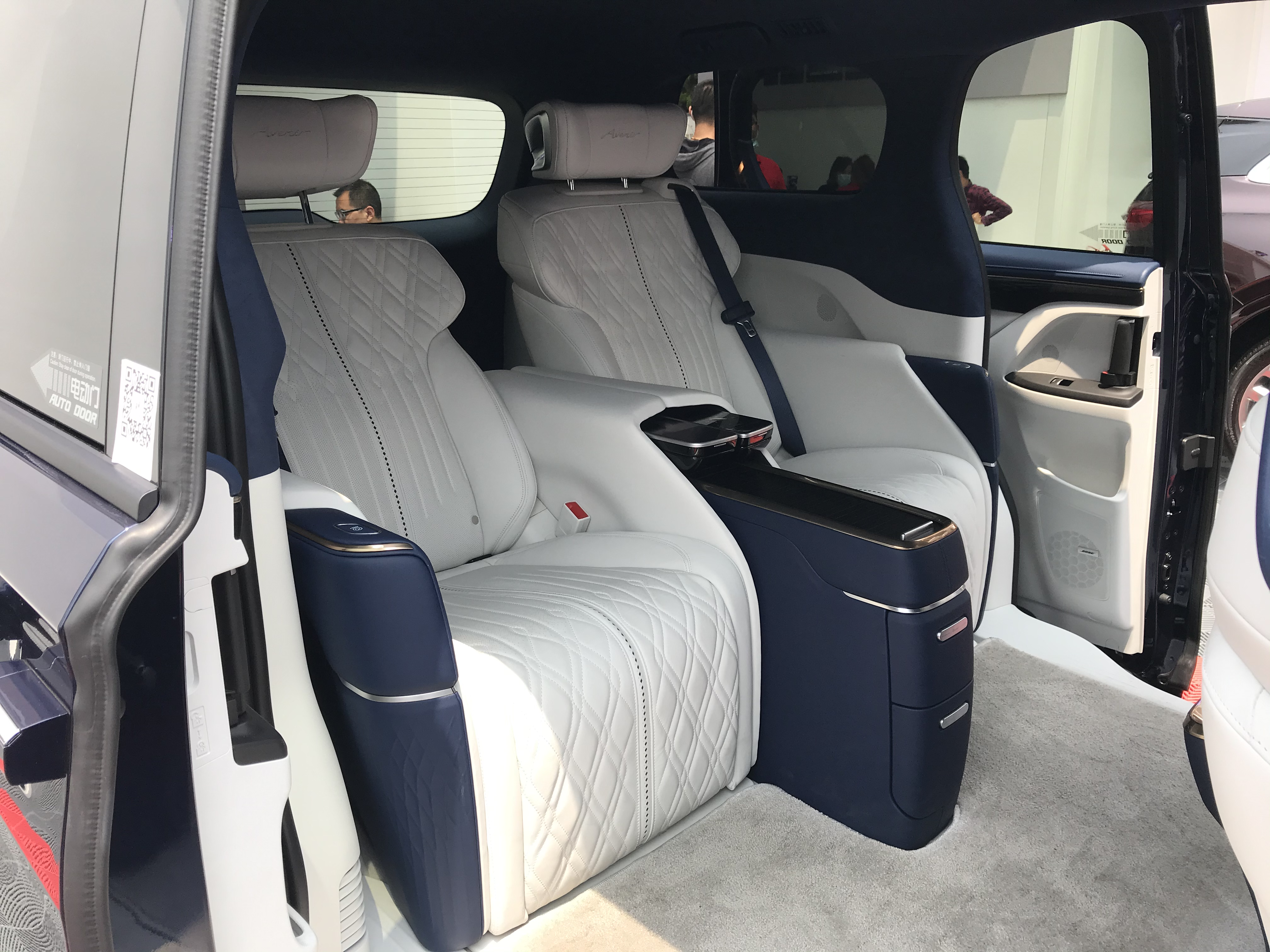
Buick Century Avenir 4 seats interior

In August 2022, SAIC-GM introduced the Buick Century (Chinese: 别克世纪; pinyin: Biékè Shìjì) or Buick GL8 Century. The Century MPV was previewed by the Buick GL8 Flagship Concept. It is the first Buick to adopt the new Pure Design philosophy, which will be seen in next-gen Buick models. the Century was launched in November 2022.

The Century is available in three models: and the top-of-the-line Century Flagship, the mid-range Century Avenir and the base Century. Both the base model and Avenir are available in single-tone paint, while the Flagship is available in two-tone with a special paint treatment. The base model and Avenir come in 7-seat and 6-seat configurations respectively, with the Flagship available with 4-seat configuration.

On the exterior, the front consists of shark-nose-like styling, a large trapezoid grille, and dual-direction headlights with a redesigned light signature. The rear features full width taillights. The base model features slightly different styling from the Avenir and Flagship. The Century is the first production model to wear Buick's new corporate emblem.

On the interior of the Flagship, there are only four seats, like in other ultra-luxury minivans in the segment. The front and rear are separated by a divider equipped with a 32" screen flanked with Bose speakers on both sides. Storage drawers are equipped below the screen. The heated captain's chairs are upholstered in Nappa-leather and feature 18-way power adjustment, ottomans, and are equipped with Bose speakers in the headrests. The infotainment system and seats are controlled by an 8-inch touchscreen. Other features include a 21-speaker Bose Executive Edition sound system, 5G internet connectivity, Apple CarPlay, and Baidu CarLife. The roof features a starry evening sky headliner, comparable to that of Rolls-Royce's Starlight Headliner.

The Century has many different colors available for the exterior and interior, depending on the trim level.

- Flagship: Available in 3 exterior colors: the two-tone Guanshan Feixue, and the monotone Guanshan Cui and Cloud White, and the interior is available in 2 colors: Fir Green and Yunfengbai.
- Avenir: Available in 4 exterior colors: Glaze Green, Dailan, Cloud White, and Xiahong, while the interior comes in 2 two-tone color options: Cabernet Red and Shale Black, and Smoke Blue and Cloud Peak White.
- Premium: Available in 3 exterior colors: Cloud White, Inkstone Ash, and Sandalwood, and only one interior color: Lin Shenzong.

Much like the previous generation GL8s, the Century is sold exclusively in China. The Century 4-seater and 6-seater Yunshi went on sale on 3 November 2022.

On August 19, 2023, Buick launched the 7-seater Base model Century, featuring slightly different styling in the front and rear compared to higher trims. It is offered in standard and Premium.

=== Safety ===
C-NCAP (2021) test results 2024 Buick Century 2.0T 6-seater Yunshi (Note: Variant name: 蕴世 MIIT registration code: SGM6523UBA3)
Category		%
Overall:	5 /5 stars	88.6%
Occupant protection:		90.43%
Vulnerable road users:		73.49%
Active safety:		93.18%

== Electra Encasa (2025) ==
Electra Encasa
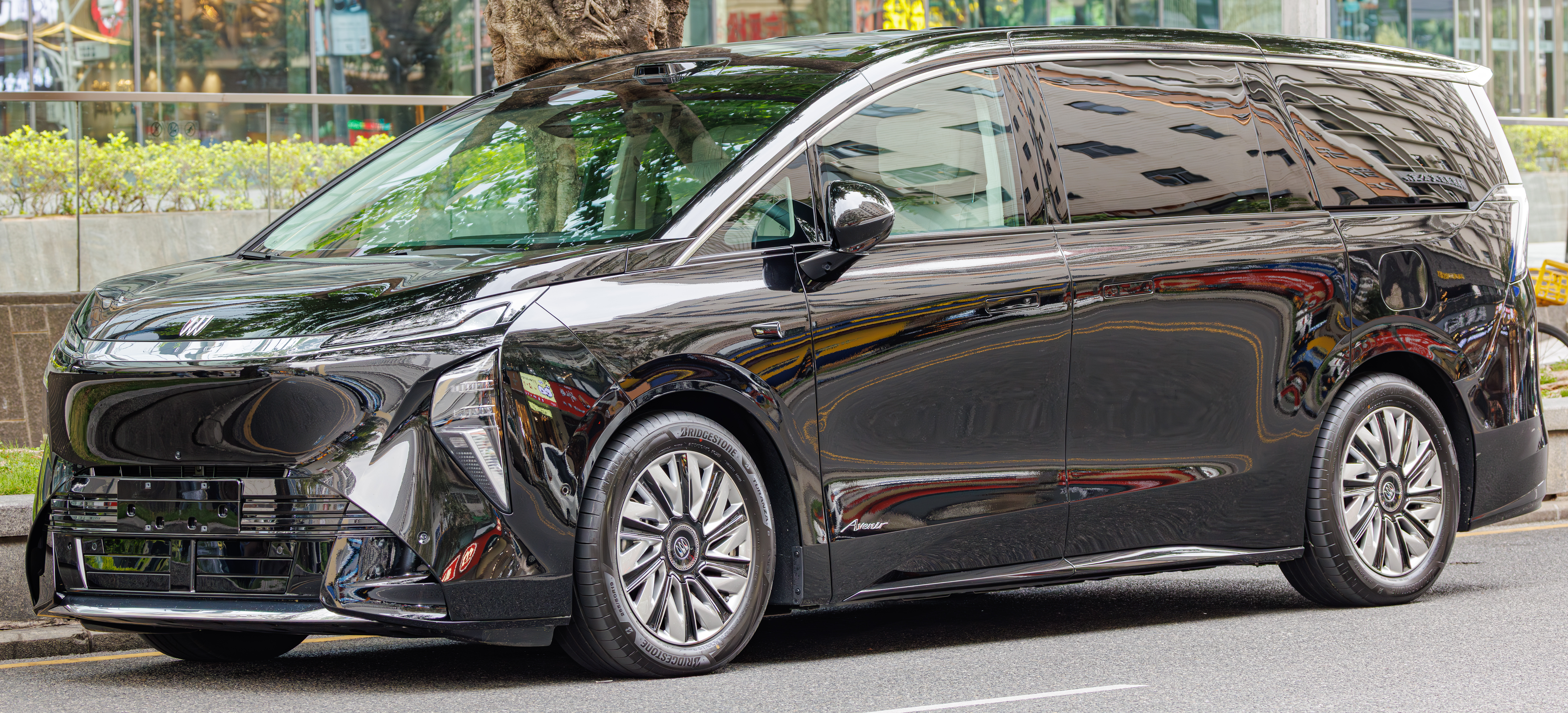

Overview
- Model code: SGM557
- Production: 2025–present
- Assembly: China: Jinqiao, Shanghai (SAIC-GM)

Body and chassis
- Body style: 5-door minivan
- Platform: Xiao Yao
- Related: Buick Electra L7; Buick Electra E7

Powertrain
- Engine: Petrol plug-in hybrid: 1.5 L LAX I4 turbo; 1.5 L LD3 I4 turbo; 2.0 L LSZ I4 turbo
- Electric motor: Permanent magnet synchronous (front), AC induction (rear)
- Transmission: 1-speed DHT (PHEV); Single-speed gear reduction (EV)
- Battery: 40.3 kWh LFP CATL; 67 kWh LFP CATL; 96.0 kWh LFP CATL
- Range: 1,320 km (820 mi) (PHEV)
- Electric range: 171–295 km (106–183 mi) (PHEV, WLTP); 224 km (139 mi) (PHEV, CLTC); 601 km (373 mi) (EV, CLTC)
- Plug-in charging: DC: 640 kW 6C (EV)

Dimensions
- Wheelbase: 3,160 mm (124.4 in)
- Length: 5,260 mm (207.1 in)
- Width: 2,023 mm (79.6 in)
- Height: 1,820 mm (71.7 in)
- Curb weight: 2,690–2,800 kg (5,930–6,173 lb)

The Buick Electra Encasa (Chinese: 别克至境世家; pinyin: Biékè Zhìjìng shìjiā) was revealed at the 2025 Guangzhou Auto Show. It is the second model of the China-exclusive Electra sub-brand and also the second model to be based on the Xiao Yao platform, developed by PATAC. Early photos of the Encasa showed a "GL8 Encasa" moniker instead of Electra. The Encasa launched on 5 December 2025 with two trims.

The Encasa uses the R6 Flywheel ADAS system provided by Momenta. The exterior has a drag coefficient of 0.258 C_{d}.

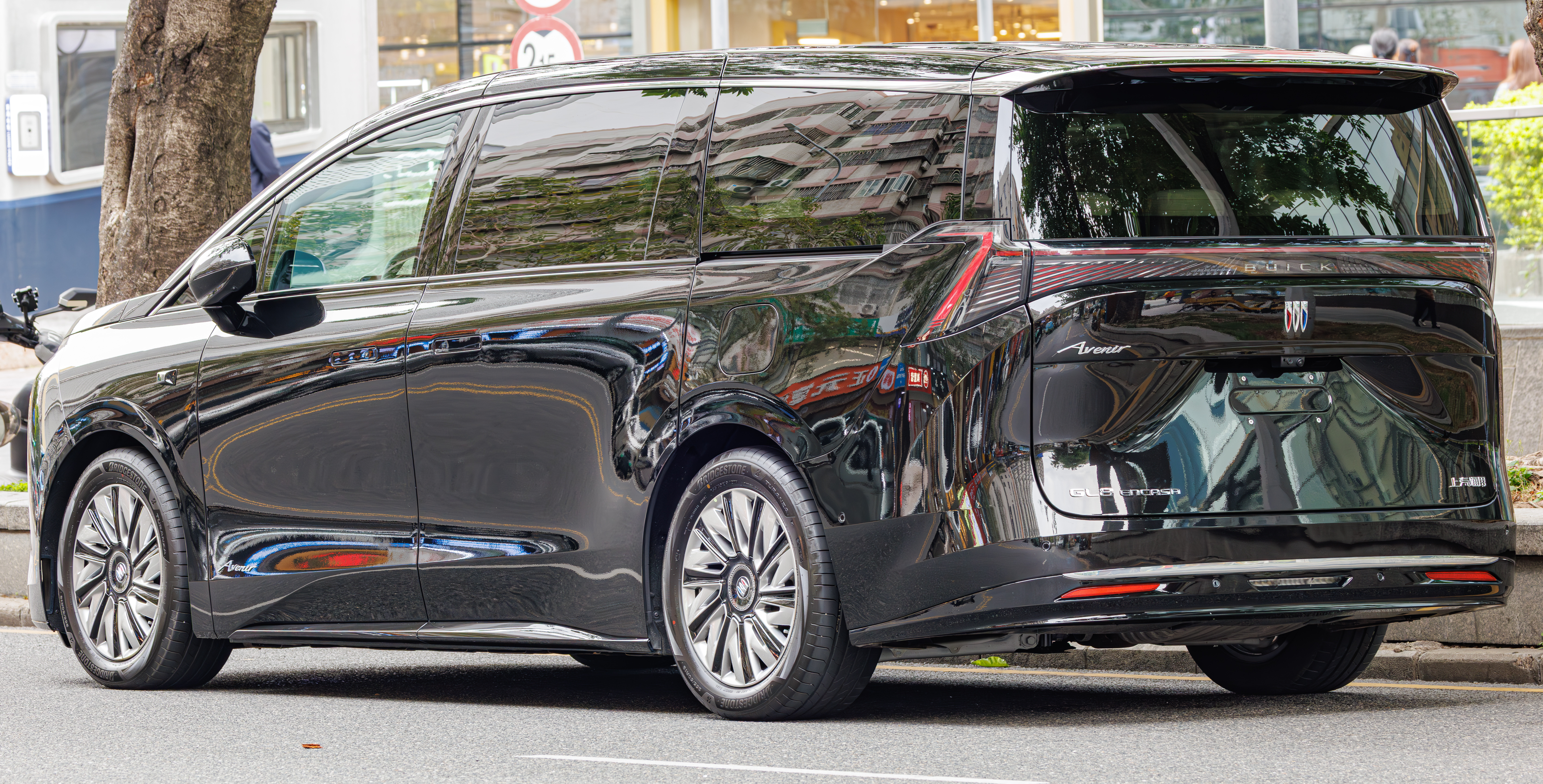
Rear view

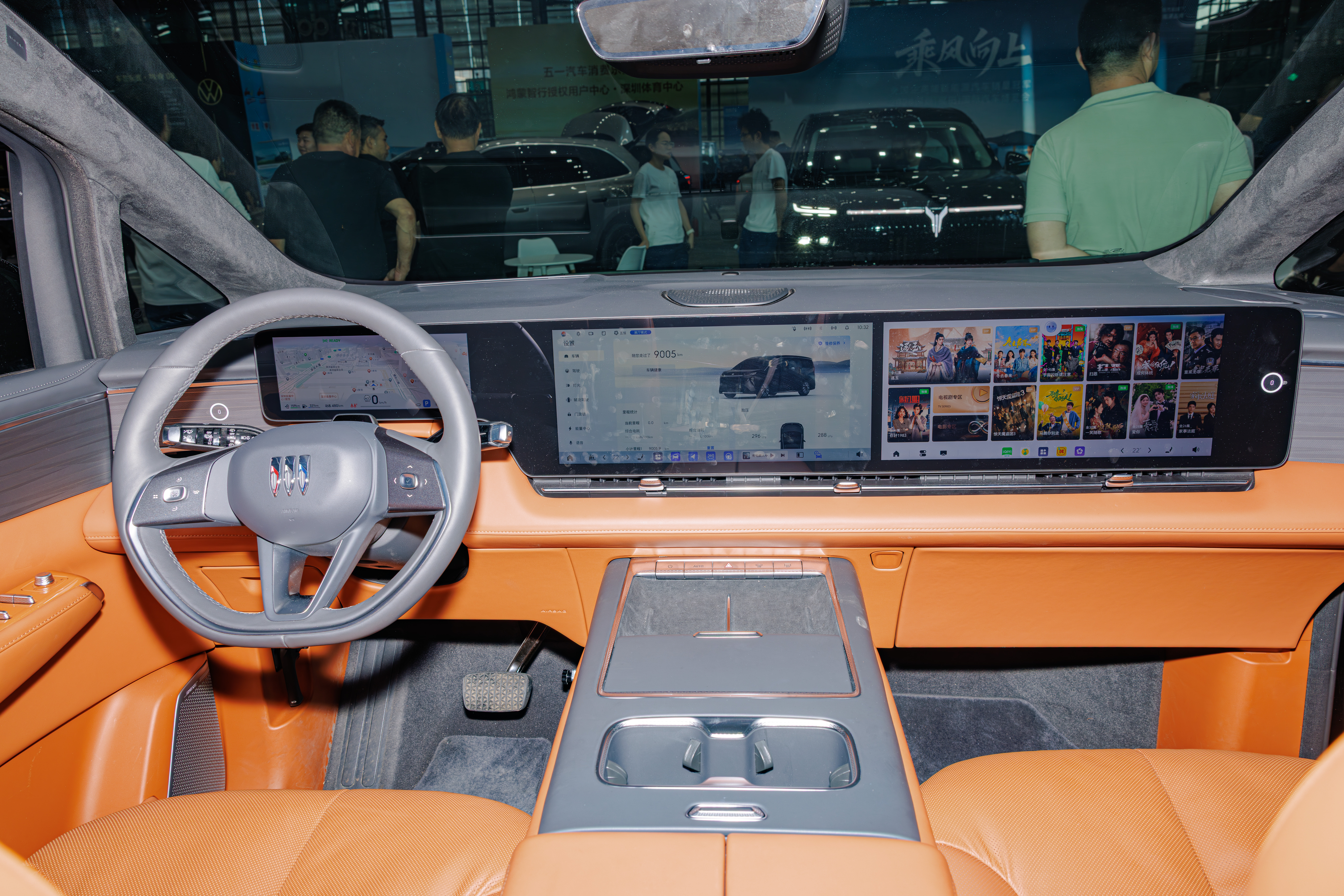
Interior

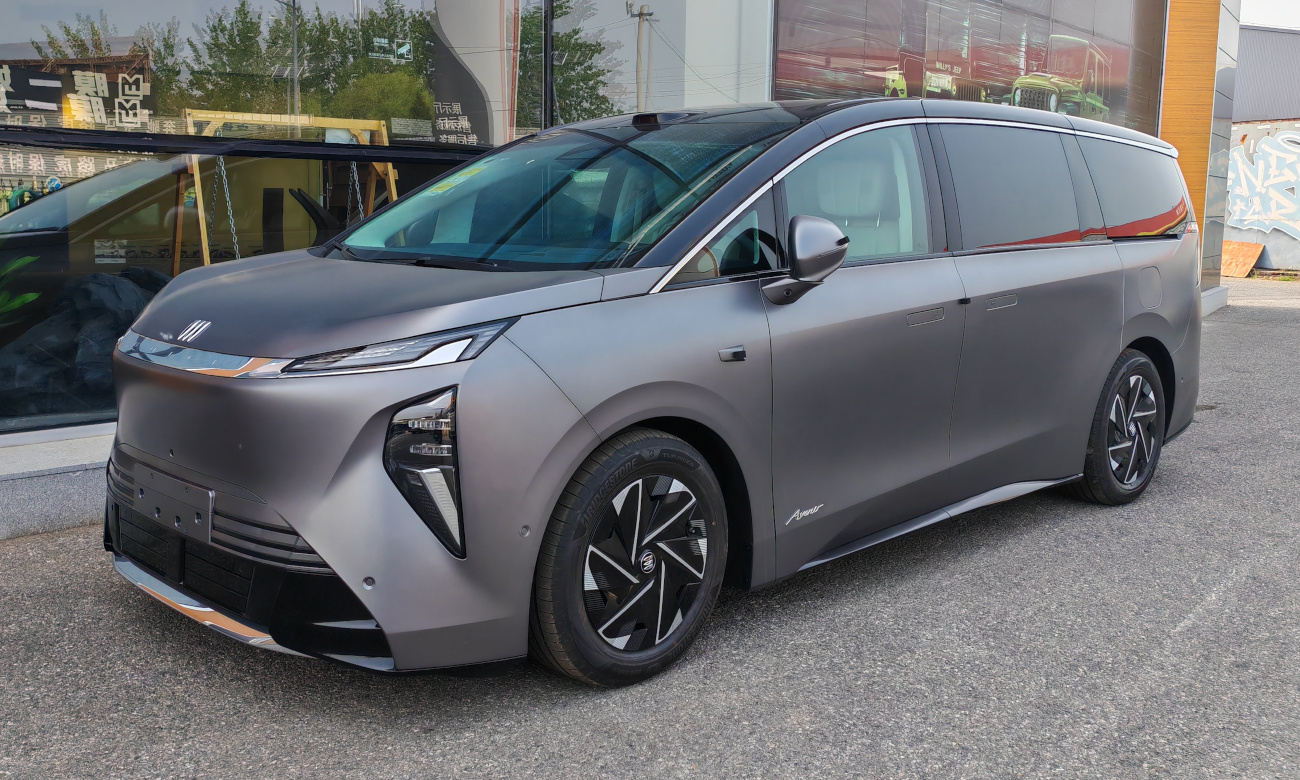
Electra Encasa EV

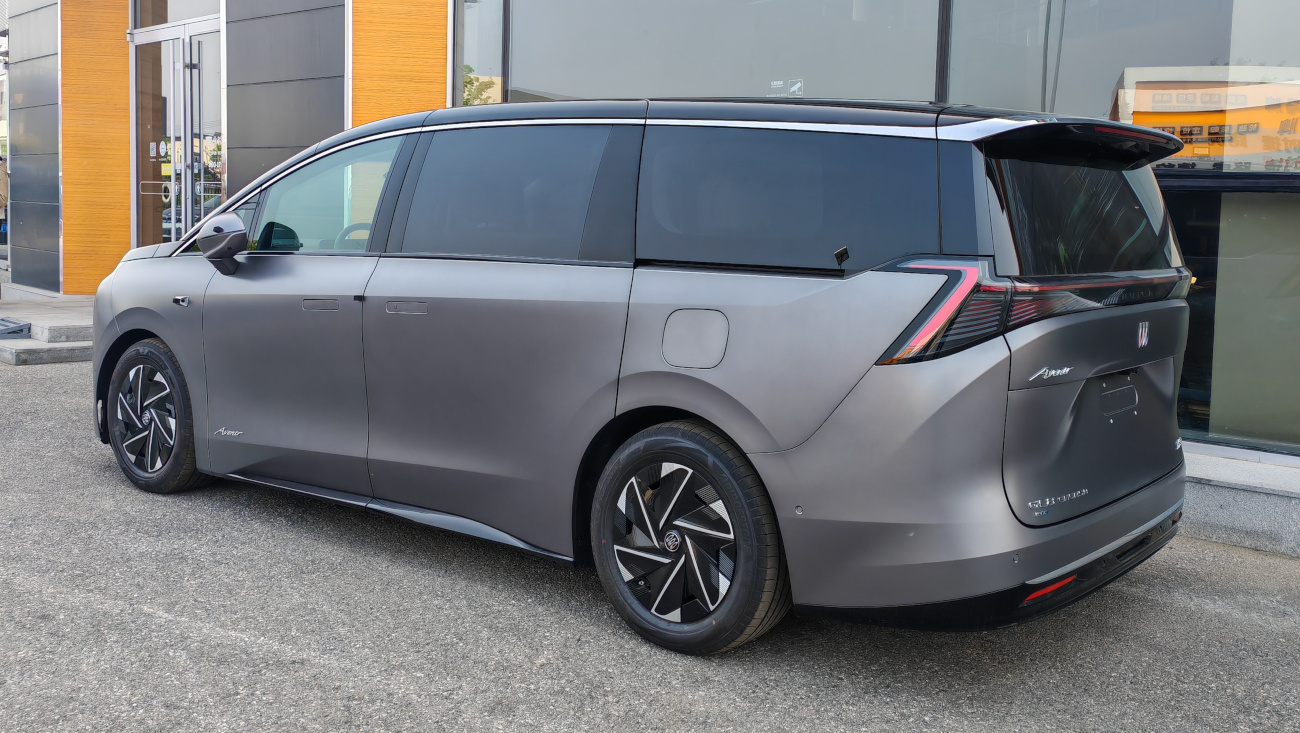
Rear view (EV)

=== Powertrain ===
The Encasa is available as either a plug-in hybrid or pure electric vehicle, both featuring all-wheel drive.

The plug-in hybrid version uses a hybrid-optimized 1.5-liter turbocharged inline-four engine which outputs 132 kW (177 hp; 179 PS) at 5,500 rpm and 255 N⋅m (188 lb⋅ft) of torque at 1,500–4,500 rpm, which is routed through a single-speed dedicated hybrid transmission. The front axle is equipped with a 268 hp (200 kW; 272 PS) motor with 340 N⋅m (251 lb⋅ft) of torque, and the rear axle has a 174 hp (130 kW; 176 PS) induction motor with 180 N⋅m (133 lb⋅ft) of torque, for a combined system output of 620 hp (462 kW; 629 PS) and 775 N⋅m (572 lb⋅ft) of torque. It is equipped with a 40.3 kWh LFP battery pack supplied by CATL, which provides an electric range of 224 km (139 mi) on the CLTC cycle and can recharge from 30–80% in 20 minutes.

The pure electric version is equipped with a 445 hp (332 kW; 451 PS) front motor with 380 N⋅m (280 lb⋅ft) of torque, and the rear axle has a 201 hp (150 kW; 204 PS) induction motor with 170 N⋅m (125 lb⋅ft) of torque, for a total of 647 hp (482 kW; 656 PS) and 550 N⋅m (406 lb⋅ft) of torque. It is equipped with a 96.0 kWh LFP battery pack supplied by CATL, which provides an electric range of 601 km (373 mi) on the CLTC cycle and is capable of 6C 640 kW peak charging speeds, allowing for a 30–80% charge time of 10 minutes.

Specifications
Model	Battery		Engine	Motors		Total output		EV range		30–80% charge	0–100 km/h (62 mph)	Kerb weight
Model	Type	Weight	Engine	Front	Rear	Power	Torque	WLTP	CLTC	30–80% charge	0–100 km/h (62 mph)	Kerb weight
PHEV	40.9 kWh LFP CATL	311 kg (686 lb)	1.5 L LAX turbo 177 hp (132 kW; 179 PS)	200 kW PMSM	130 kW induction	620 hp (462 kW; 629 PS)	775 N⋅m (572 lb⋅ft)	171 km (106 mi)	224 km (139 mi)	20 min	5.8 sec	2,690 kg (5,930 lb)
PHEV	67 kWh LFP CATL	450 kg (992 lb)	1.5 L LD3 turbo 154 hp (115 kW; 156 PS)	270 kW (117 kW rated)	—			295 km (183 mi)				2,780 kg (6,129 lb)
PHEV	67 kWh LFP CATL	450 kg (992 lb)	1.5 L LD3 turbo 154 hp (115 kW; 156 PS)	270 kW (117 kW rated)	120 kW (25 kW rated)			286 km (178 mi)				2,860 kg (6,305 lb)
PHEV	67 kWh LFP CATL	450 kg (992 lb)	2.0 L LSZ turbo 208 hp (155 kW; 211 PS)	270 kW (117 kW rated)	120 kW (25 kW rated)			285 km (177 mi)				2,915 kg (6,426 lb)
EV	96 kWh LFP CATL	674 kg (1,486 lb)	—	332 kW PMSM	150 kW induction	647 hp (482 kW; 656 PS)	550 N⋅m (406 lb⋅ft)	—	601 km (373 mi)	10 min	5.1 sec	2,800 kg (6,173 lb)

== Sales ==
Year	China	
Year	GL8	GL8 PHEV
2001	9,983	—
2002	17,801	—
2003	23,520	—
2004	29,086	—
2005	26,258	—
2006	38,007	—
2007	42,494	—
2008	36,252	—
2009	40,029	—
2010	52,127	—
2011	66,903	—
2012	64,001	—
2013	70,191	—
2014	80,476	—
2015	78,985	—
2016	79,600	—
2017	145,853	—
2018	144,308	—
2019	148,121	—
2020	156,879	—
2021	170,011	—
2022	114,175	—
2023	118,756	—
2024	69,948	23,308
2025	57,363	55,505

Century
Year	China
2023	17,834
2024	10,957
2025	6,514

Electra Encasa
Year	China
2025	3,204
