= Chevrolet Lumina (disambiguation) =

The Chevrolet Lumina was a front-wheel drive sedan and coupé sold in North America from 1989 to 2001.

Chevrolet Lumina may also refer to:

- Chevrolet Lumina APV, a front-wheel drive minivan sold in North America from 1989 to 1997
- Holden Commodore, a rebadged rear-wheel drive sedan and coupé utility sold in the Middle East, South Africa and Southeast Asia from 1998 to 2011
- Holden Monaro, a rebadged rear-wheel drive coupé sold in the Middle East and South Africa from 2001 to 2006
- Buick Regal, a rebadged front-wheel drive sedan sold in the Philippines from 2005 to 2006
