= GM 4T60-E transmission =

4T60-E/4T65-E

Overview
- Manufacturer: General Motors
- Production: 1990–2011

Body and chassis
- Class: 4-speed transverse automatic transmission

Chronology
- Predecessor: Turbo-Hydramatic 125
- Successor: 6T70

The 4T60-E (and similar 4T65-E) is a series of automatic transmissions from General Motors. Designed for transverse engine configurations, the series includes 4 forward gears. The 4Txx family is an evolution of the original Turbo-Hydramatic 125 transverse automatic introduced in the late 1970s and the Turbo-Hydramatic 440 transmission developed in the mid-1980s.

The "-E" transmission is electronically controlled and features an automatic overdrive transaxle with an electronically controlled torque converter clutch.

The 4T65 is built at Warren Transmission in Warren, Michigan.

Gear ratios:

1	2	3	4	R	Diff Ratio
2.921	1.568	1.000	0.705	2.385	2.86, 3.05, 3.29 (HD 3.29)

Drive and Driven sprocket combinations and ratios

33 Drive / 37 Driven creates a 0.892:1 ratio

35 Drive / 35 Drive creates a 1.000:1 ratio

37 Drive / 33 Driven creates a 1.121:1 ratio

Example -

3.29 diff ratio divided by 1.121 = 2.93

3.29 diff ratio divided by .892 = 3.69

== 4T60-E ==
For 1991 GM introduced the 4T60-E which was a 4T60 with electronic controls, first seen on the new Buick Park Avenue. One benefit was that the cruise control was integrated into the gearbox' electronic control module, improving the ability to maintain a set speed while avoiding needless shifting, thus lowering fuel consumption and noise levels. By the mid-1990s, the 4T60-E was the transmission of choice in nearly every front-wheel drive GM vehicle with the exception of compacts. A heavy-duty 4T60-E HD was produced in 1996 for the supercharged GM 3800 engine The 4T60-E was phased out in favor of the 4T65 beginning in 1997.

The 4T60-E featured a 245 mm (9.6 in) torque converter with varying stall speed and gear ratios. For example, a 1995 Beretta features a 1650 rpm stall converter as opposed to a 1999 Century converter with a stall of 2095 rpm. In the 4T60 family of transmissions, the combination of drive-chain sprocket ratios and the differential gear ratio together offer up to 12 different possible final drive ratios to allow the transmission family to cover various engine and vehicle applications.

Replacing a complete transaxle should only be done if a unit is verified to be the same as the unit it replaces, as in addition to the up to 12 variants of the final drive ratio, different applications and years can and will have incompatible electrical connectors. The use of an incorrect transaxle will result in undesired operation, up to and including total non-functioning of the transaxle.

Gear ratios:

1	2	3	4	R
2.921	1.568	1.000	0.705	2.385

Applications:

- 4T60-E
  - 1994-1999 Buick Century
  - 1992-1997 Buick LeSabre 3800 V6, L27
  - 1991-1996 Buick Park Avenue V6 3.8 L
  - 1991 Buick Reatta 3800 V6
  - 1993-1997 Buick Regal
  - 1991-1993 Buick Riviera 3800 V6
  - 1995-1996 Buick Riviera L67 & L36
  - 1994-1998 Buick Skylark
  - 1991-1993 Cadillac DeVille 4.9L V8
  - 1991-1992 Cadillac Fleetwood
  - 1991-1993 Cadillac Seville
  - 1991-1993 Cadillac Sixty Special
  - 1994–1996 Chevrolet Beretta/Corsica V6 3.1 L
  - 1992–1996 Chevrolet Lumina APV V6 3.4 L/3.8 L
  - 1993–2000 Chevrolet Lumina
  - 1995-1999 Chevrolet Monte Carlo
  - 1997-1998 Chevrolet Venture
  - 1994-1998 Oldsmobile Achieva
  - 1994-1996 Oldsmobile Cutlass Ciera/Oldsmobile Ciera V6 3100 L
  - 1993-1997 Oldsmobile Cutlass Supreme
  - 1992-1997 Oldsmobile 88
  - 1991-1996 Oldsmobile 98
  - 1992–1998 Oldsmobile Silhouette V6 3.4 L/3.8 L
  - 1991-1992 Oldsmobile Toronado/Trofeo 3800 V6
  - 1992-1997 Pontiac Bonneville
  - 1994-1998 Pontiac Grand Am V6 3.1 L
  - 1992-1996 Pontiac Grand Prix "GT" & GTP 3.4L V6 (LQ1 Motor)
  - 1992–1998 Pontiac Trans Sport V6 3.4 L/3.8 L
- 4T60-E HD
  - 1991-1996 Buick Park Avenue
  - 1992-1996 Oldsmobile 88
  - 1992-1996 Oldsmobile 98
  - 1992-1996 Pontiac Bonneville
  - 1997 Pontiac Grand Prix "GT" 3800 V6 (L36 Motor)
  - 1995-1996 Buick Riviera

== 4T65-E ==
The 4T65-E was introduced to replace the 4T60-E in 1997. The 4T65-E included a larger 258 mm torque converter for some models and many other changes to improve reliability. It is able to handle vehicles up to 6500 lb (2948 kg) GVWR with up to 280 ft·lbf (380 N·m) of torque. A number of final drive ratios are available, with many distinct models. Starting in mid year 2000 models, all 4T65-E models received an upgraded valve body. Starting in 2003 the internal electronics were changed, hardened 4th gear shaft, ratcheting sprags for input and third gear were added. The last application was the 2011 Chevrolet Impala as GM has transitioned to the 6T70 family transmissions for 2012.

Models:

- M15 — 245 mm (9.6 in) torque converter
- MN3 — 258 mm (10.2 in) torque converter
- MN7 — 258 mm (10.2 in) torque converter and heavy-duty gearbox (see 4T65E-HD)
- MD7 — 245 mm (9.6 in) torque converter (Chinese version)
- M76 — 245 mm (9.6 in) torque converter (with all-wheel drive capability)

Gear ratios:

1	2	3	4	R
2.921	1.568	1.000	0.705	2.385

Applications:

- M15
- 2.86:1
  - Buick LaCrosse 3.8 (05–09)
  - Chevrolet Impala LA1
  - Chevrolet Monte Carlo LA1
- 3.05:1
  - 2000-2005 Buick Century V6 3.1 L
  - 1997–2003 Chevrolet Lumina/Monte Carlo V6 3.4 L/3.8 L
  - 1997–2003 Chevrolet Venture V6 3.4 L
  - 2000–2003 Chevrolet Impala V6 3.4 L/3.8 L
  - 1997–2001 Chevrolet Lumina/Monte Carlo V6 3.1 L
  - 1998-1999 Oldsmobile Intrigue V6 3.8 L
  - 1998-2003 Pontiac Grand Prix V6 3.1 L/3.8 L
  - 1997-2004 Pontiac Grand Prix "GT" 3800 V6 (L36 Motor)
- 3.29:1 M15
  - Buick Rendezvous
  - Buick Terraza
  - Chevrolet Uplander
  - Pontiac Montana SV6
  - Pontiac Aztek
  - Saturn Relay
- 3.29:1 M76
  - Buick Rendezvous
  - Chevrolet Impala 9C1
  - Oldsmobile Aurora V6
  - Oldsmobile Intrigue Autobahn Package/PCS
  - Oldsmobile Silhouette
  - Pontiac Aztek
- 3.69:1
  - 2006-2007 Chevrolet Malibu (SS Models) V6 3.9 L

M15

  - Buick LeSabre
  - Pontiac Bonneville FQ3
  - 1997-2004 Buick Regal V6 3.8 L LS/LSE
  - 1997-2005 Buick Park Avenue V6 3.8 L
  - 1999-2002 Oldsmobile Intrigue V6 3.5 L
- 3.69:1 M76
  - Buick Terraza
  - Buick Rendezvous
  - Chevrolet Uplander
  - Pontiac Aztek
  - Pontiac Montana SV6
  - Saturn Relay
  - Volvo S80
  - Volvo XC90

=== 4T65E-HD ===
The 4T65E-HD (code MN7) is a heavy duty version of the 4T65-E used with more powerful engines such as the LS4 V8 and L67/L32 supercharged V6. The HD version features a larger, stronger differential. Because of this, the passenger-side CV axle is different (shorter) to accommodate the larger HD differential housing. (Drivers side axles are the same length, passenger side has shorter axles compared to standard 4t65e)

Applications:

- 2.93:1 MN7
  - Oldsmobile 88 LSS L67
  - Pontiac Bonneville SSEi L67
  - Chevrolet Impala SS L67 (04–05)
  - Chevrolet Monte Carlo SS L67 (04–05)
  - Pontiac Grand Prix GTP L67(97-03)(L32-04-08)
  - Buick Regal GS L67
  - Buick Riviera L67 (97–99)
  - Buick Park Avenue Ultra L67
  - Chevrolet Impala SS LS4 (06–09)
  - Chevrolet Monte Carlo SS LS4 (06–07)
  - Buick LaCrosse/Allure Super (08–09)
  - Pontiac Grand Prix GXP (05–07)
- 3.29:1
  - Pontiac Grand Prix GTP Comp G (L32) (04–05)

== See also ==
- List of GM transmissions
