= Chevrolet Venture =

Minivan

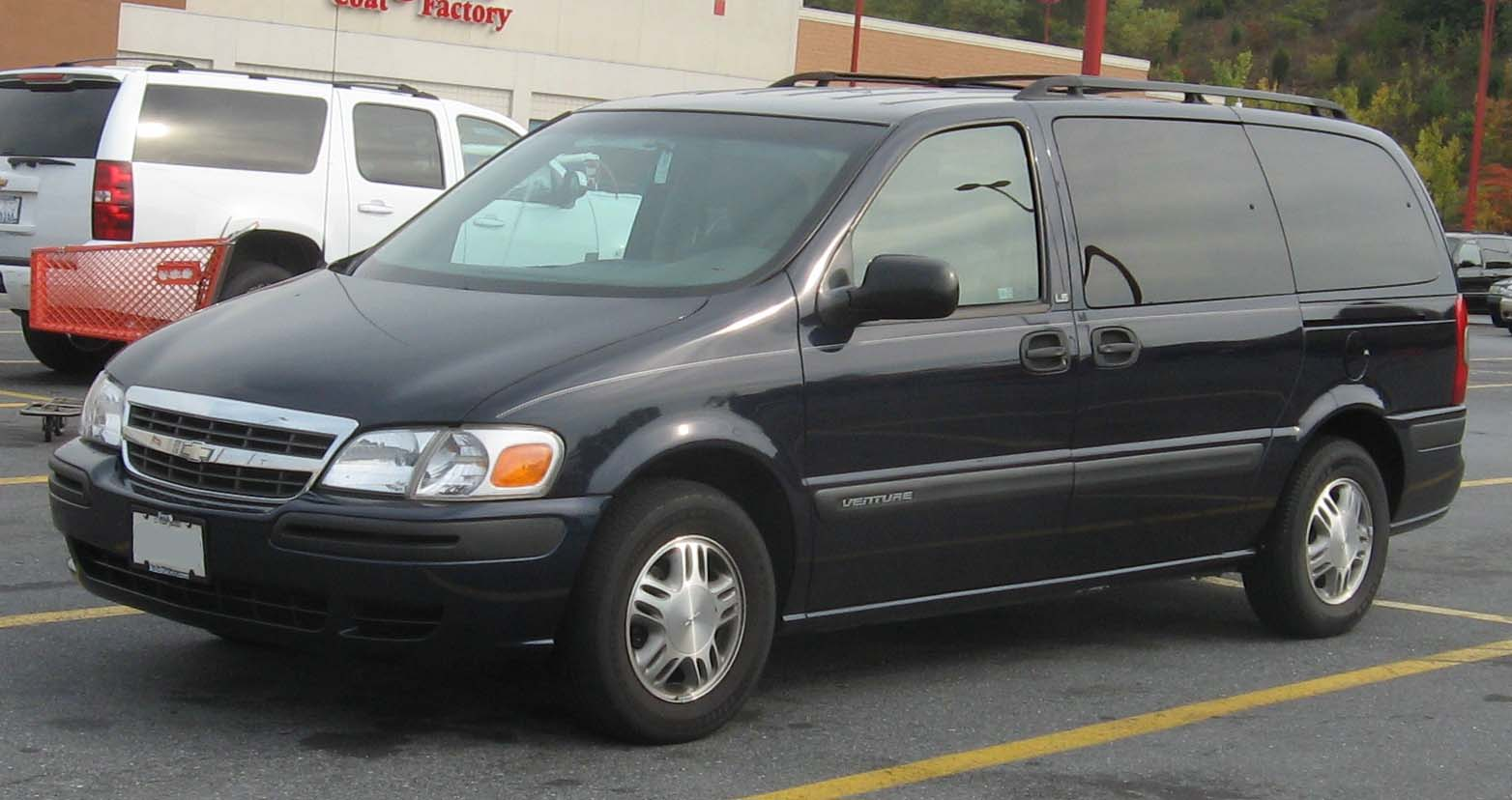
- 2001–2005 Chevrolet Venture LWB

Overview
- Manufacturer: General Motors
- Also called: Oldsmobile Silhouette; Pontiac Trans Sport (until 1999); Pontiac Montana; Chevrolet Trans Sport (Europe); Opel Sintra (Europe, until 1999); Vauxhall Sintra (United Kingdom, until 1999); Buick GL8 (China, from 2000); Pontiac Trans Sport Montana (until 1999)
- Production: July 1996 – June 24, 2005
- Model years: 1997–2005
- Assembly: Doraville Assembly, Doraville, Georgia, United States; Shanghai, China (Buick GL8 and a 10-seater version of the Chevrolet Venture exclusive for the Philippines)
- Designer: Wayne Cherry (1993)

Body and chassis
- Class: Minivan
- Body style: 3-door minivan 4-door minivan
- Layout: Transverse front-engine, front-wheel drive / all-wheel drive
- Platform: U-body/GMT200
- Related: Chevrolet Uplander; Buick GL8; Buick GL8 First Land; Buick Terraza; Oldsmobile Silhouette; Opel Sintra/Vauxhall Sintra; Pontiac Trans Sport; Pontiac Trans Sport Montana; Pontiac Montana; Pontiac Montana SV6; Saturn Relay; Buick Rendezvous; Pontiac Aztek

Powertrain
- Engine: 3.4 L LA1 V6
- Transmission: 4-speed 4T65-E automatic

Dimensions
- Wheelbase: 112.0 in (2,845 mm); 120.0 in (3,048 mm)
- Length: 186.9 in (4,747 mm) (SWB); 200.9 in (5,103 mm) (LWB)
- Width: 72.0 in (1,829 mm)
- Height: 67.4 in (1,712 mm) (SWB); 68.1 in (1,730 mm) (LWB)

Chronology
- Predecessor: Chevrolet Lumina APV
- Successor: Chevrolet Uplander

The Chevrolet Venture is a minivan produced by General Motors for the 1997 to 2005 model years. The Chevrolet Venture, along with most of its General Motors minivan siblings, was built at GM's Doraville, Georgia, assembly plant.

== Use of name ==
The Venture name was first used on a 1988 Chevrolet concept car, which was a full-size four-door sedan more aerodynamic than the 1991–1996 Chevrolet Caprice. It was exhibited in January 1988 at the Teamwork & Technology: For Today and Tomorrow show at the Waldorf-Astoria hotel in New York City.

== History ==
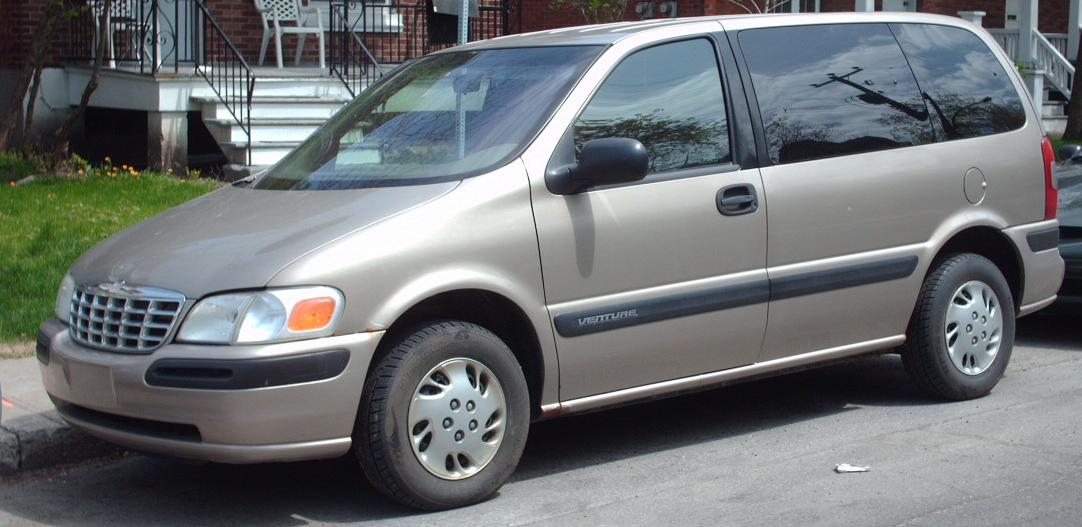
1997–2000 Chevrolet Venture SWB

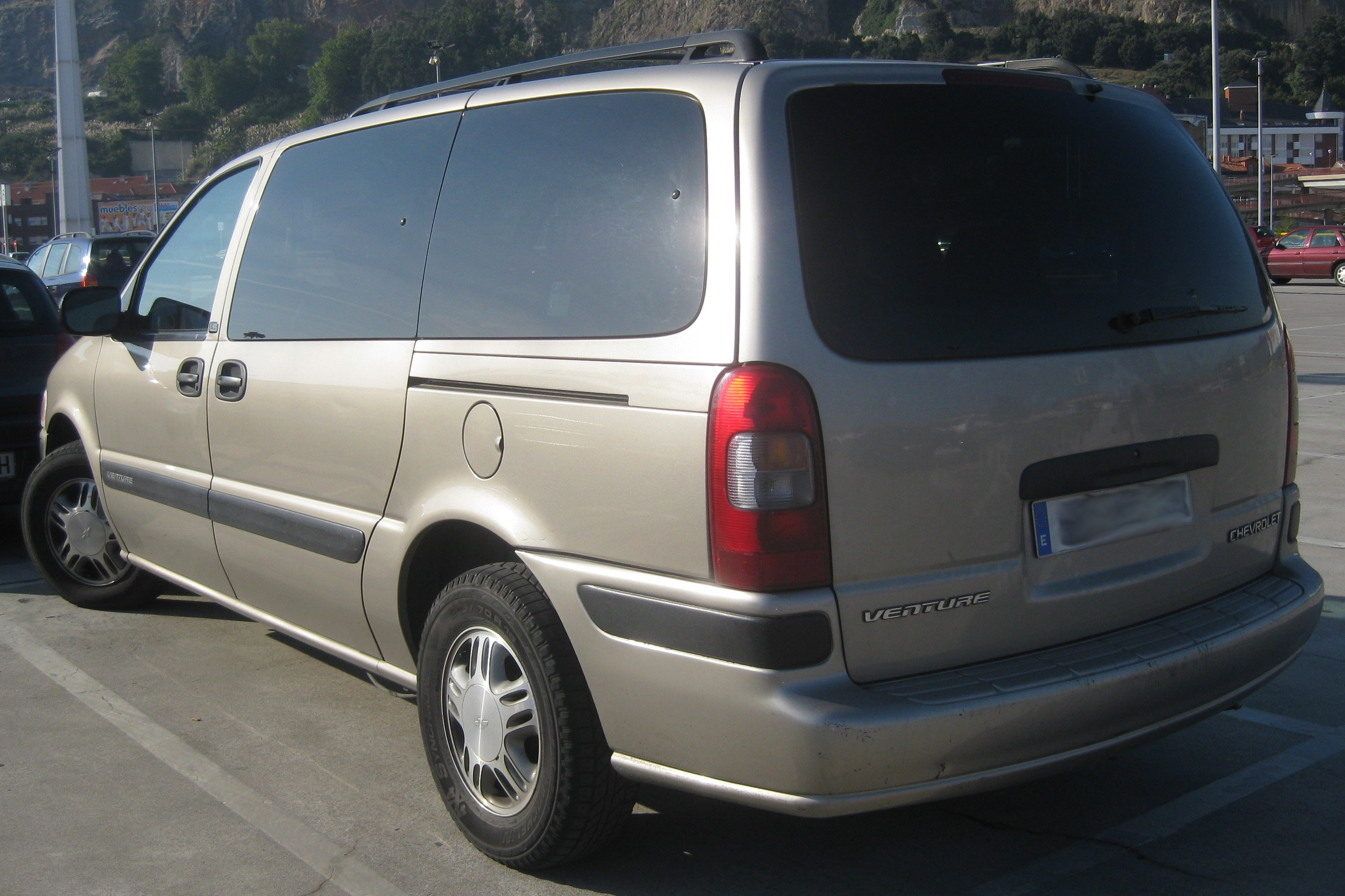
2001–2005 Chevrolet Venture LS

The Venture was introduced in 1996 for the 1997 model year as a replacement for the radically styled Lumina APV. In the United States, it was also sold as the Oldsmobile Silhouette and the Pontiac Trans Sport, which was later renamed as the Pontiac Montana for 1999 (2000 in Canada). The Venture came in three trim levels, the base, LS, and LT. The base models of the Venture were short-wheelbase models which came equipped with cloth upholstery, front bucket seats with fixed head restraints, a second-row two-passenger bench seat, and steel wheels. The LS came in both short and long wheelbases, and offered aluminum wheels, a varied seating configuration, adjustable head restraints, side airbags, power windows (optional on the base models), and a remote keyless entry system. The LT model was a step above the LS; exclusively offered as a long-wheelbase model, it offered a power driver seat (optional on the base and LS models), optional leather seats, a roof rack (optional on the base and LS models), and a driver-side sliding door (optional on the base and LS models from 1997 to 1999). The anti-lock brakes were standard on all Ventures from 1996 to 2002, but became optional on the base models later on.

The Venture and its siblings were powered by GM's 3.4 L LA1 V6, rated at 180 hp (134 kW). After 1999, the engine was slightly redesigned to produce an extra 5 hp (4 kW), for a total of 185 hp (138 kW), and the instrument panel alarm system has been changed. All Ventures used a four-speed automatic transmission. The Venture was one of the few minivans to have an eight-passenger seating configuration as an option when most minivans seated up to seven passengers. In 2000, the driver-side sliding door became standard on all trim levels, as the passenger-side-only sliding-door models of minivans had rapidly fallen out of favor since Chrysler introduced minivans with the driver-side sliding door for 1996. The exterior was refreshed in 2001, a back-up alarm was added to indicate possible obstacles behind the vehicle, and an all-wheel drive system dubbed Versatrak was introduced in 2002. Also for 2002 was a new steering wheel equivalent to the 2000–2005 Chevrolet Impala, replacing the one that was used in the 1995–2001 Chevrolet Lumina. New for this generation, cabin air filters were installed, and the filters can be accessed from behind an access panel easily accessed from inside the glove compartment.

The optional 2-3-2 seating configuration was dropped in favor of the more conventional 2-2-3 and 2-3-3 seating configurations. The 2-3-3 was the standard for the Chinese-made Buick GL8, and a ten-seat model arranged in a 3-4-3 configuration was used in a Chinese-made version of the Chevrolet Venture for export to the Philippines and Latin America (where it sold alongside the U.S. Venture) where ten-seaters are favored with lower taxes. Reviews and sales were generally lukewarm, especially about the relatively narrow cabin since it had been designed for European roads. Models came in both short and long wheelbases, and long-wheelbase models were available with all-wheel drive. The third row bench seat was designed to fold flat (introduced for 2001 and available on LS and Warner Bros. models), but forming a higher floor unlike the Honda, Mazda, and Nissan minivans that folded into a well behind the third row.

The Venture was replaced after 2005 by the Chevrolet Uplander, which was essentially a facelift with one long wheelbase configuration, and a longer nose which served chiefly to improve crush distance and styling more like an SUV. Only the long-wheelbase Venture was sold for 2005. Production of the Chevrolet Venture ended on June 24, 2005.

== Model year changes ==
- 1997: Introduced with completely redesigned exterior and interior. Offered in two wheelbases, with three- or four-door options (four-door available only on long-wheelbase). Introduced coolant loss engine protection, dual air bags and expanded storage capacity.
- 1998: Dual sliding doors and a power sliding door option became available on short-wheelbase models.
- 1999: The long-wheelbase three-door model was discontinued. Standard heated outside power mirrors introduced. Engine output increased to 185 horsepower and 210 lb-ft of torque.
- 2000: The Value Van (a decontented regular-wheelbase model) and the high-end "Warner Bros. Edition" models were introduced. Three-door configurations were discontinued. The radios were updated and top tether anchors for child seats were added. Eight-passenger models became available.
- 2001: The front fascia and steering wheel were redesigned. HVAC air filtration and rear parking assist systems were introduced. The second-generation video system now featured a larger screen, second-row speakers dedicated to the video system, and four wireless headphones. A LATCH system for child seat safety was added. The cargo model was discontinued.
- 2002: GM's Versatrak all-wheel-drive system (on long-wheelbase models only) was introduced. New Mobility, Touring, and Convenience packages were. The VCR was replaced with a DVD player in the Entertainment package. Dual-stage airbags were added for increased safety.
- 2003: A new "Value Plus" model was introduced. The "Sport Package" became available on short-wheelbase models, featuring seven-passenger seating, a roof rack, and aluminum wheels. Added options for DVD entertainment and heated leather seats. The glove box lock and "Push to Release" text on the parking brake pedal were removed.
- 2004: A CD/MP3 radio became available.
- 2005: All-wheel-drive and short-wheelbase models were discontinued.

== Warner Bros. Edition ==
A Warner Bros. edition, introduced in 1999 as part of an overall deal between GM and Warner Bros., included leather and cloth seats, standard built-in child restraints, Warner Bros. badging with Bugs Bunny leaning on the Warner Bros. Shield logo, and a DVD entertainment system, a novelty at the time (VHS players were offered at first; DVD capability was added for the 2002 model year, with the VHS option dropped).

The Warner Bros. edition was only produced for the 2000–2003 model years and the only model to come with a monochromatic exterior (like its Silhouette twin) as opposed to black accents that the other Ventures offered and this model only came in four colors: Blue, red, silver, and black. These models included a complementary membership in VentureTainment, which sent free gifts to owners of the van, including VHS and DVD compilations of Looney Tunes (as well as other Warner Bros. Family Entertainment titles), a cooler with can holders, a special keychain and other perks (including discounts at the Warner Bros. Studio Stores and Six Flags theme parks).

== Safety ==
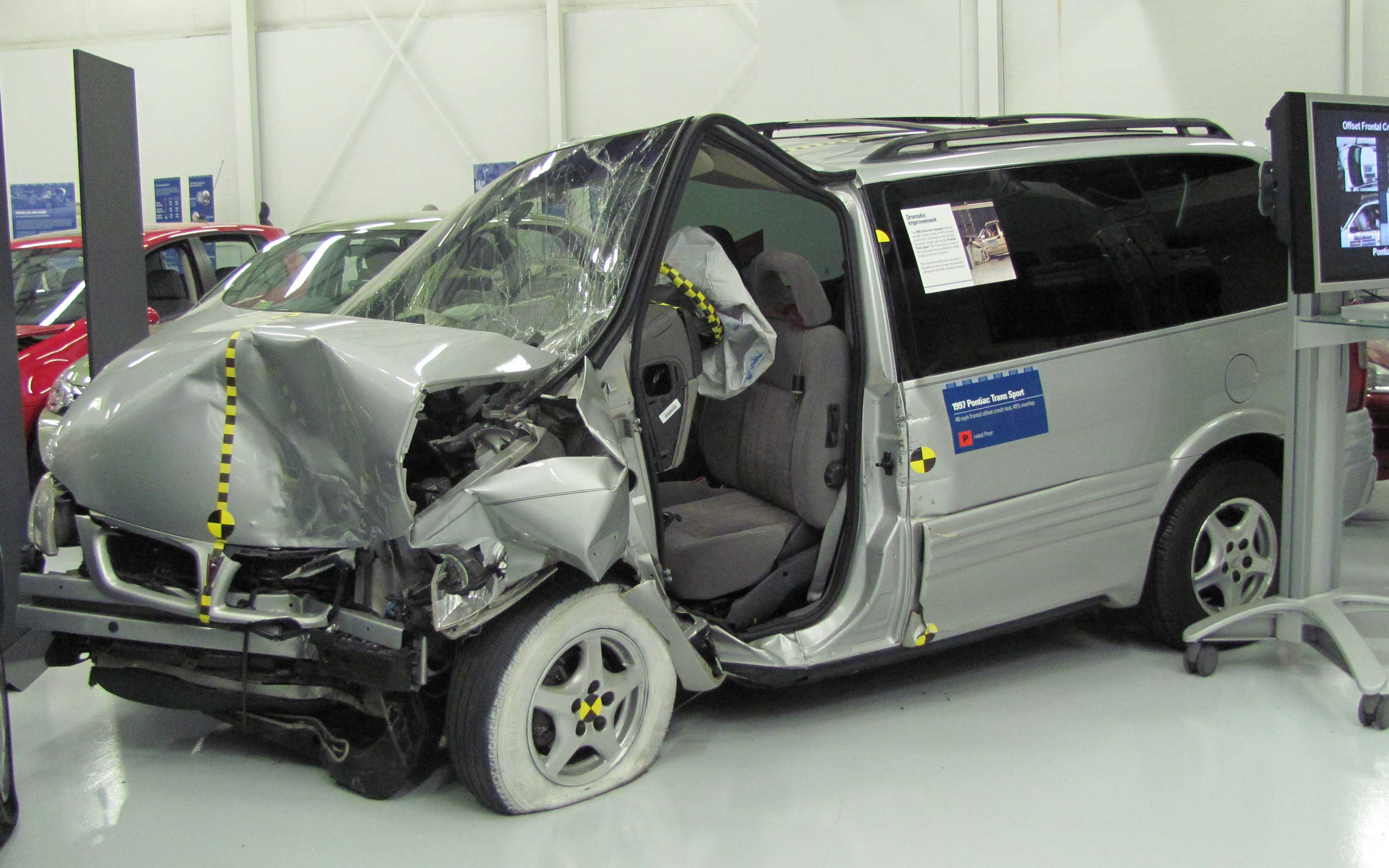
The 1997 Pontiac Trans Sport crash-tested by the Insurance Institute for Highway Safety

In late 1996, the Insurance Institute for Highway Safety (IIHS) crash-tested the 1997 Pontiac Trans Sport (a twin of the Venture). Due to the poor structural performance resulting in extreme damage to the front of the vehicle, it received a "Poor" rating in the 40 mph (64 km/h) moderate overlap crash test and was ranked the "Worst Performing Vehicle" of all the vehicles tested by the institute, with test results indicating a high risk of serious injury or fatality. This result affected both the Venture's and the Silhouette's safety reputations (as well its test subject, the Pontiac Trans Sport/Montana).

Additionally, its European twin, the Opel/Vauxhall Sintra, also did badly in the Euro NCAP's crash test from 1998 with near-similar results (despite performing well in the side-impact test), with a rating of 2.5 stars (out of 5).

On the other hand, the U.S. National Highway Traffic Safety Administration (NHTSA) gave the 1997 Chevrolet Venture a rating of 4 stars out of 5 in the 35 mph (56 km/h) frontal-impact test, and 5 stars in the side-impact test. Tests on subsequent model years yielded results of 4 stars in most categories, and 3 or 5 stars in others. This applies to all other U-body minivans of the time. Unlike the IIHS, however, the NHTSA does not conduct moderate overlap crash tests.

The safety issues of the Venture and its U-body siblings would later be addressed with the Uplander in 2005, in which it earned the highest rating of "Good" given by the IIHS institute in the moderate overlap crash test.
