= Teamwork & Technology: For Today and Tomorrow =

General Motors in 1988 held the largest exhibition to that date of its vehicle design and technology, called Teamwork & Technology: For Today and Tomorrow, at New York's Waldorf-Astoria hotel, site of the first Motorama exhibition in 1949.

Multi-media for the event was presented on a bank of 240 monitors produced by Bob Rogers (designer) and BRC Imagination Arts. This display was noteworthy as twice the size of the largest previous video-monitor display that time.

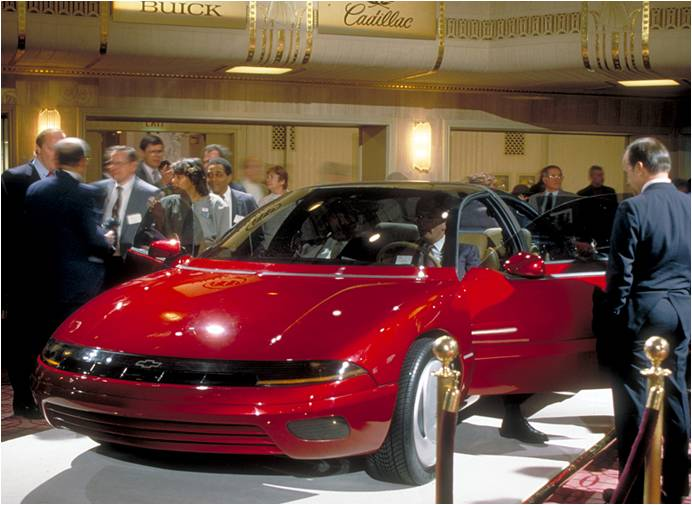
Chevrolet Venture Concept at 1988 Teamwork and Technology

== Introductions ==
- Buick Lucerne Concept
- Cadillac Voyage Concept
- Chevrolet Venture Concept
- GMC Centaur Concept
- Pontiac Banshee Concept

An unnamed sports car concept was also shown, but only as a clay model. The logo for Saturn corporation made its debut at Teamwork & Technology.
