= General Motors U platform =

U-platform
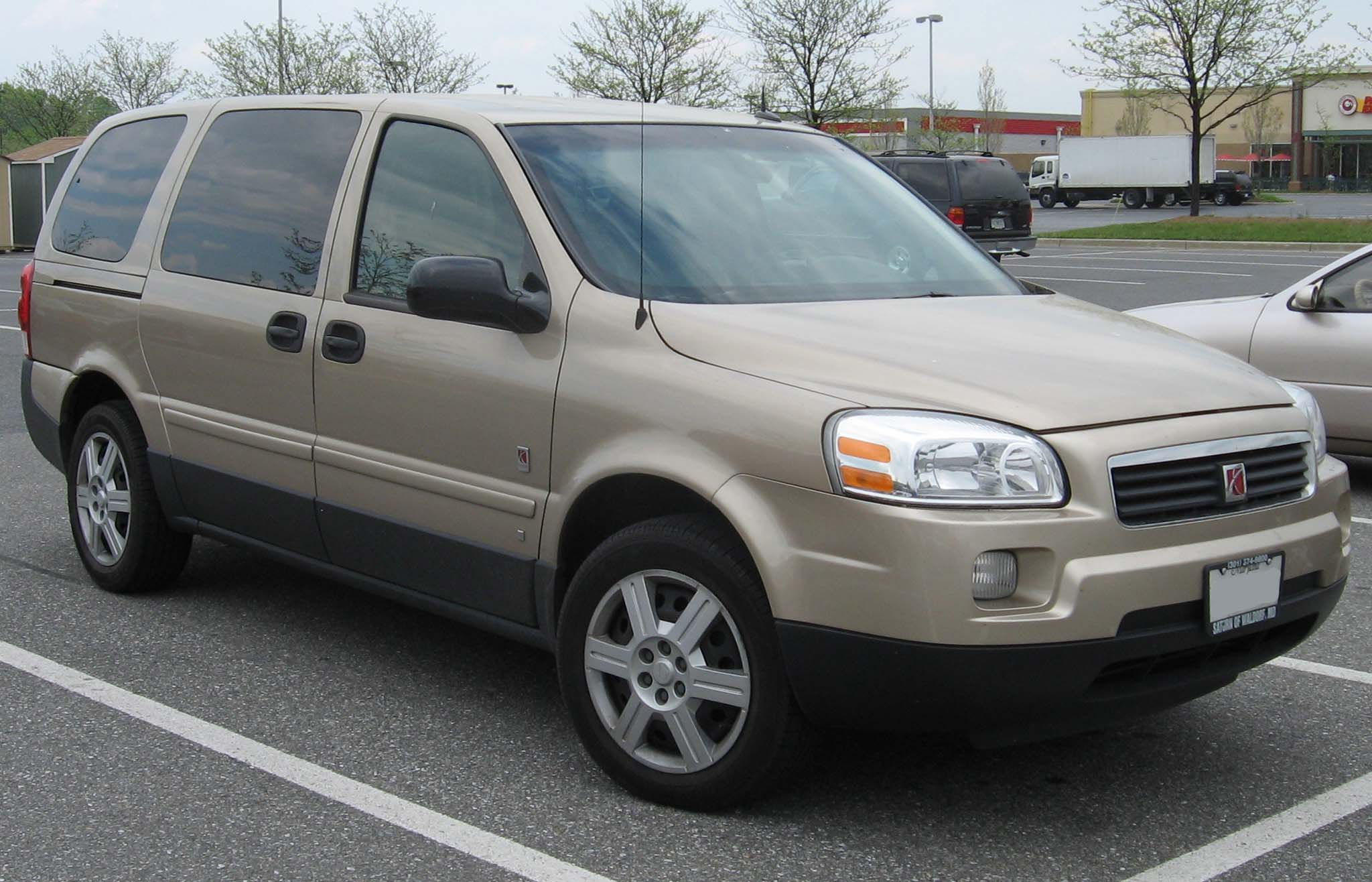

Overview
- Manufacturer: General Motors
- Production: North America: 1990–2009; China: 2000–present
- Assembly: Tarrytown, New York (1990–1996); Doraville, Georgia (1997–2008); Shanghai, China (SAIC-GM) (1999-2004, 2016-present); Shenyang, Liaoning, China (SAIC-GM Norsom Motors) (2010-present)

Body and chassis
- Class: Minivan; Crossover SUV
- Layout: FF layout/All-Wheel Drive
- Body styles: 3-door minivan 4-door minivan 4-door Crossover SUV

Chronology
- Successor: GM Lambda platform (North America and Middle East)

The U-platform (or U-body) is a front wheel drive minivan and crossover SUV platform from General Motors produced since 1990. North American sales ended in 2009, but Chinese production continues. The minivans were divided into three generations, 1990–1996, 1997–2005 and 2005-current. The U-body was also used for General Motors' first generation crossovers from 2001-2005.

Keeping with its EPA designation as a light truck, the fifth character in the VIN for a U-body is "U", instead of the fourth, as is standard for cars.

Confusingly, GM also used the "U-body" (or "U-car") designation in the mid 1970s for its mid-sized European models - principally the Opel Ascona and Vauxhall Cavalier.

== Minivans ==
=== First generation ===
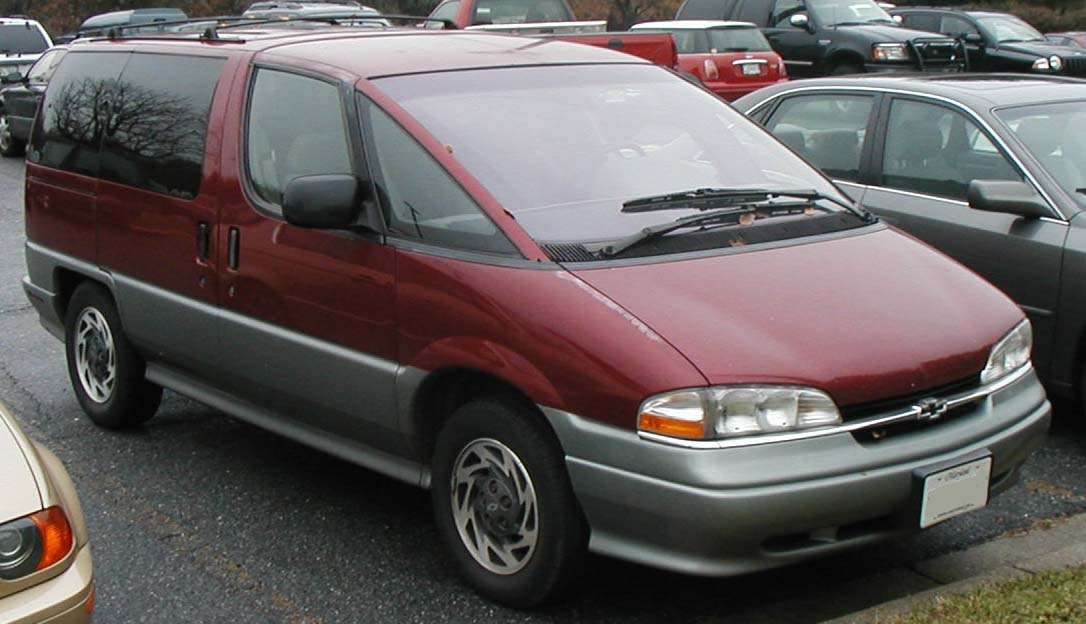
1994-1996 Chevrolet Lumina

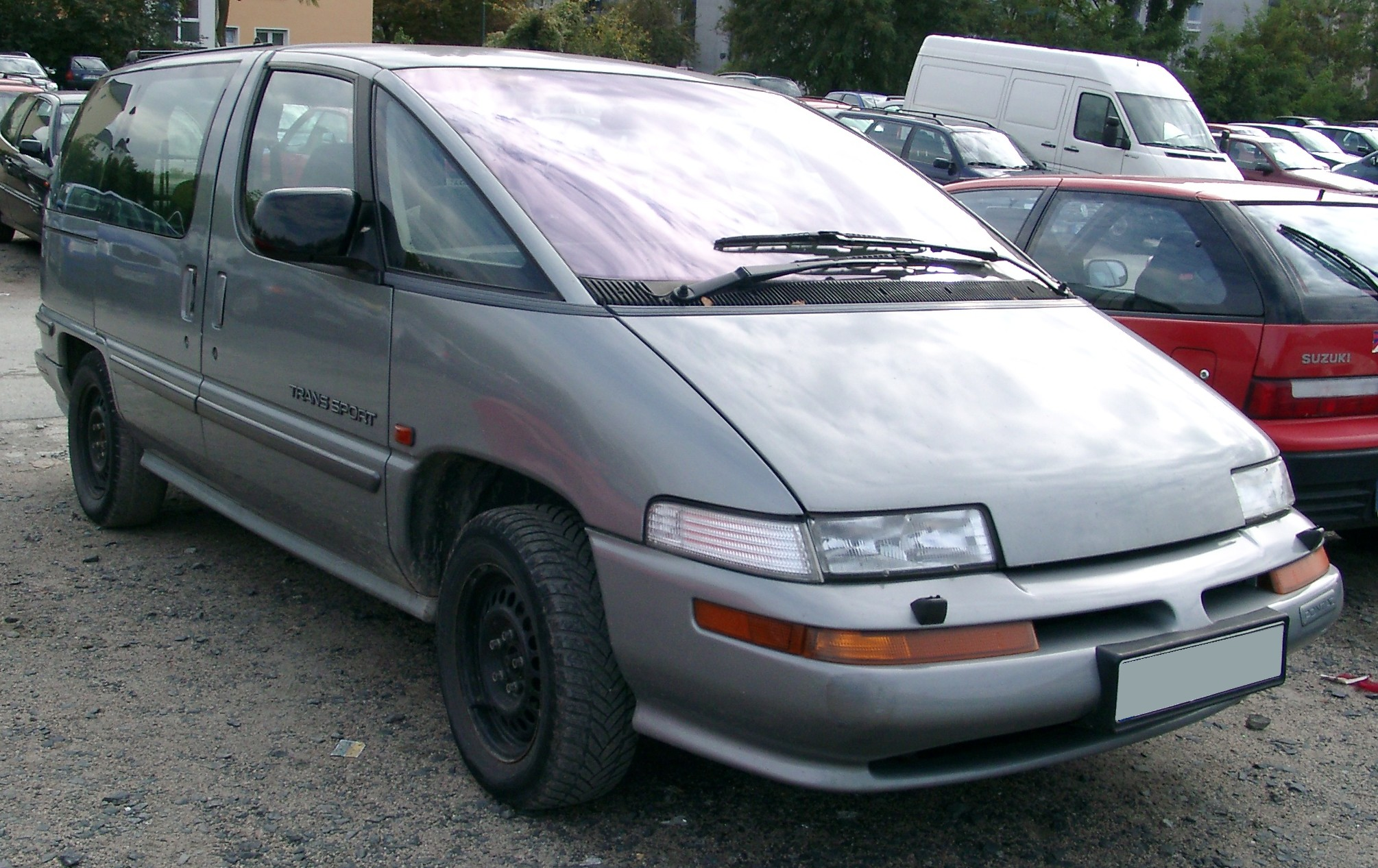
European Pontiac Trans Sport

Released in the fall of 1989 for the 1990 model year, the U platform (GMT199) utilized a galvanized steel space frame underneath composite plastic dent resistant panels similar to those used in Saturn models and the Pontiac Fiero. The vans feature unconventional styling, which some commenters likened it to a DustBuster vacuum cleaner.

All models used a 120-hp, 3.1L V6 mated to a 3-speed automatic transmission. In 1992, the 3800 Series I V6 became available with a four speed automatic. Both were replaced by the LA1 3400 V6 in 1996.

==== 1990–1996 ====
The vehicles in this generation included:

- Chevrolet Lumina APV ("APV" was dropped from the model name in 1994)
- Oldsmobile Silhouette
- Pontiac Trans Sport

In 1994, The Lumina and Trans Sport received a facelift, which shortened the nose and gave them a more conventional look. The Silhouette did not receive this update, however, and while it did receive a facelift in 1993, it was very minimalistic with only the front bumper being slightly changed. The rest of the front end remained unchanged.

==== International ====
The Pontiac Trans Sport was sold in Europe as a rebadged Oldsmobile Silhouette with European safety specifications.

European customers had grown accustomed to sleek minivans, thanks to vehicles such as the Renault Espace, and did not object to the Trans Sport's futuristic styling. In 1994, when the Trans Sport was updated, the European version retained the original shape with a minor facelift, with the Oldsmobile Silhouette being sold as a badge-engineered Pontiac Trans Sport.

The European Trans Sport was also available with two options that were never offered on a North American specification U-body: A four-cylinder engine (the LD2 Quad 4) and a 5-speed manual transmission.

=== Second generation ===
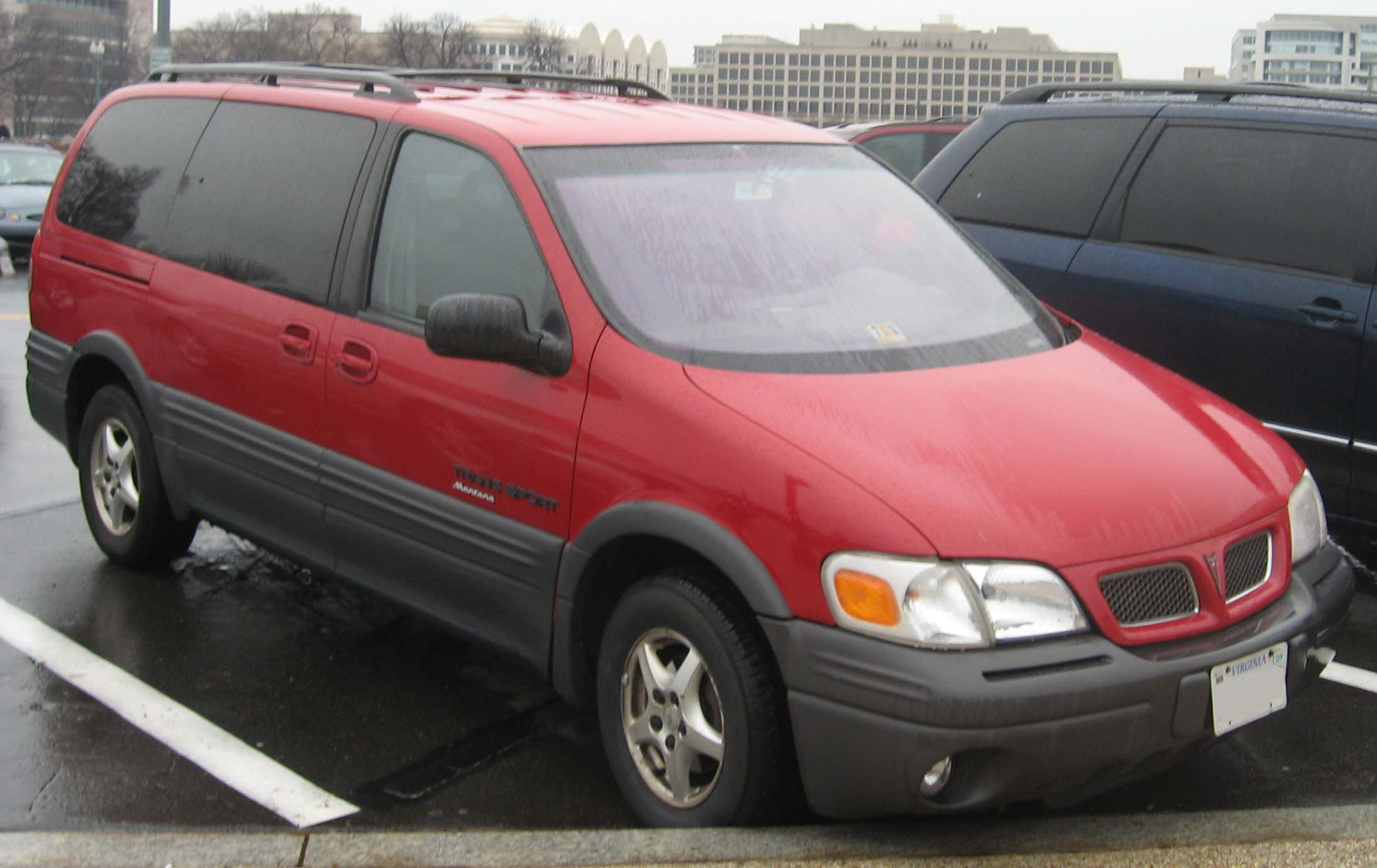
Pontiac Trans Sport Montana

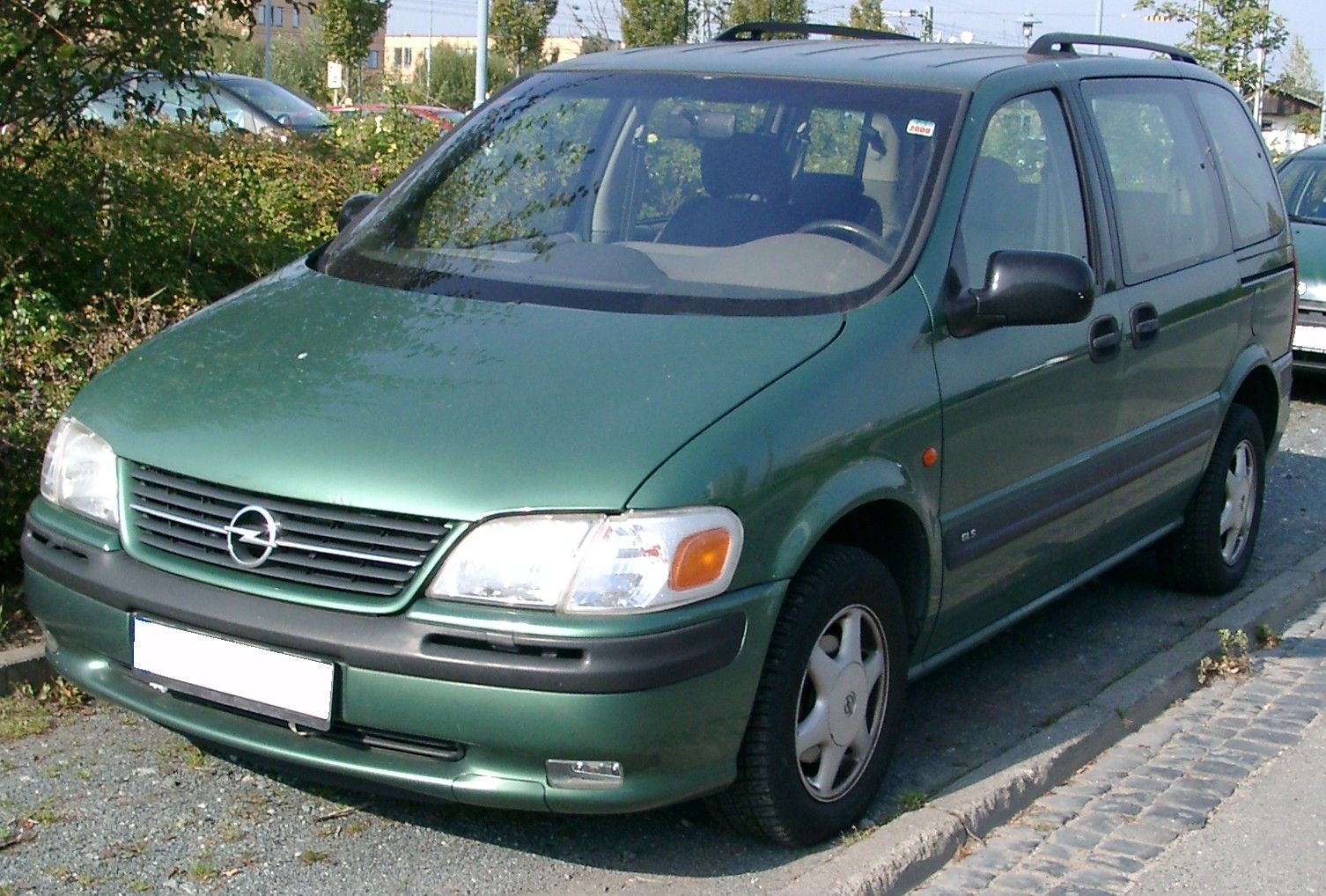
Opel Sintra

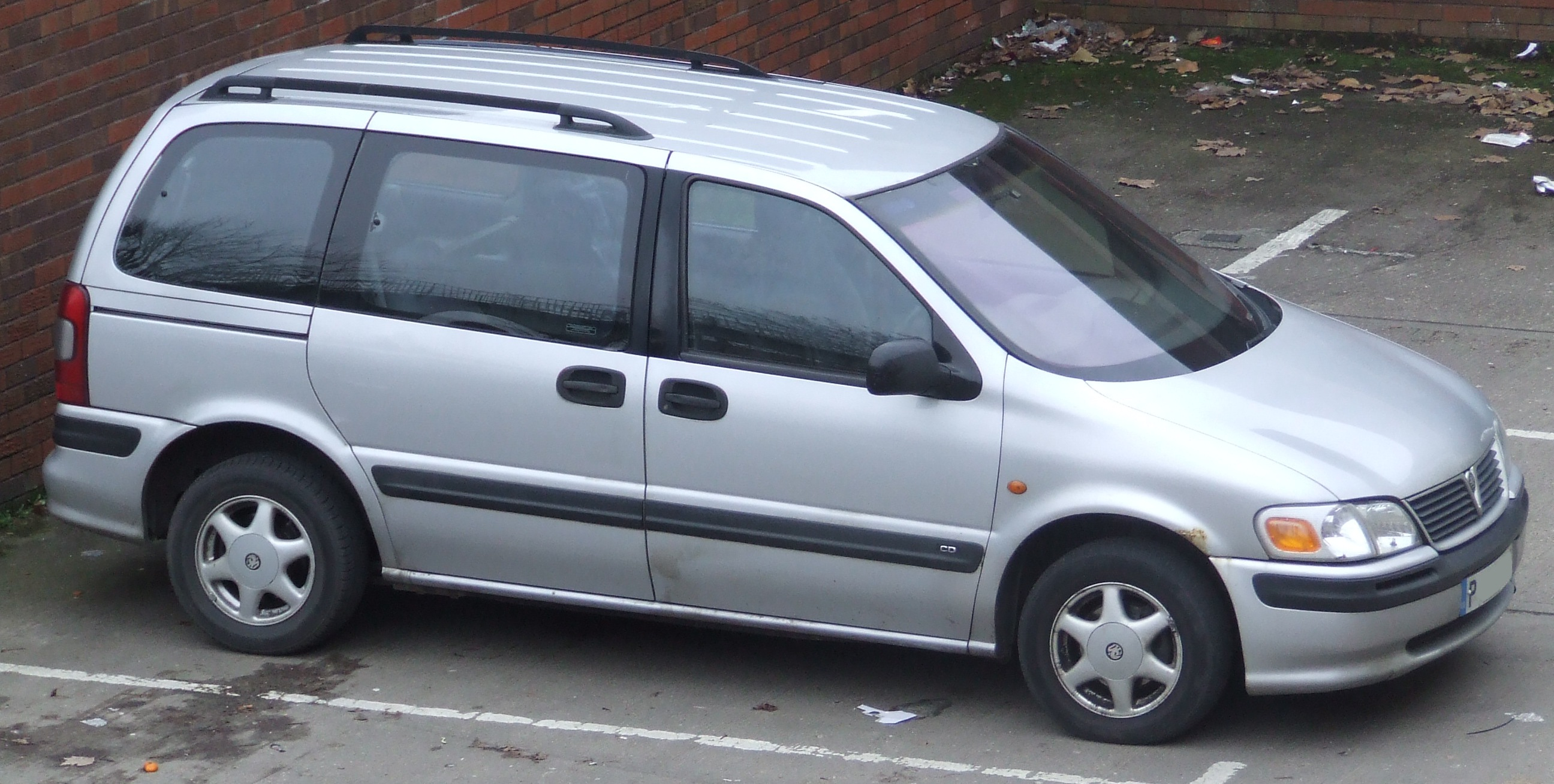
1996-1997 Vauxhall Sintra

In 1996 (for the 1997 model year), the second U-body (platform) minivans arrived, also known as the GMT200. The new minivans were of unibody steel construction and the styling was intentionally conventional to such an extent that contemporary reviewers remarked that without looking closely at the badging and grille treatments, these minivans could be mistaken for their primary competitors, the Dodge Caravan and Plymouth Voyager, which at the time commanded a 50% share of the minivan market. Production of this generation was performed at GM's Doraville, Georgia facility, and later at GM Shanghai.

==== 1996–1999 (Europe) ====
- Opel/Vauxhall Sintra

==== 1997–2005 ====
The vehicles in this generation included:

- Chevrolet Venture
- Oldsmobile Silhouette
- Pontiac Trans Sport
- Pontiac Montana (Montana was a trim level of the Trans Sport prior to 1999)

==== 2000–2005 (China) ====
- Buick GL8

==== International ====
- The Opel Sintra (badged as the Vauxhall Sintra in the United Kingdom) was an export built in the US alongside other vans for the European market. The Sintra used Opel engines instead of the LA1 3400 V6 engine that the US vans used.
- The Buick GL8 is sold by Buick only in China, but was exported to the Philippines as a Chevrolet Venture.
- The Pontiac Trans Sport of this generation was also sold in Europe, badged as a Chevrolet Trans Sport.

=== Third generation ===
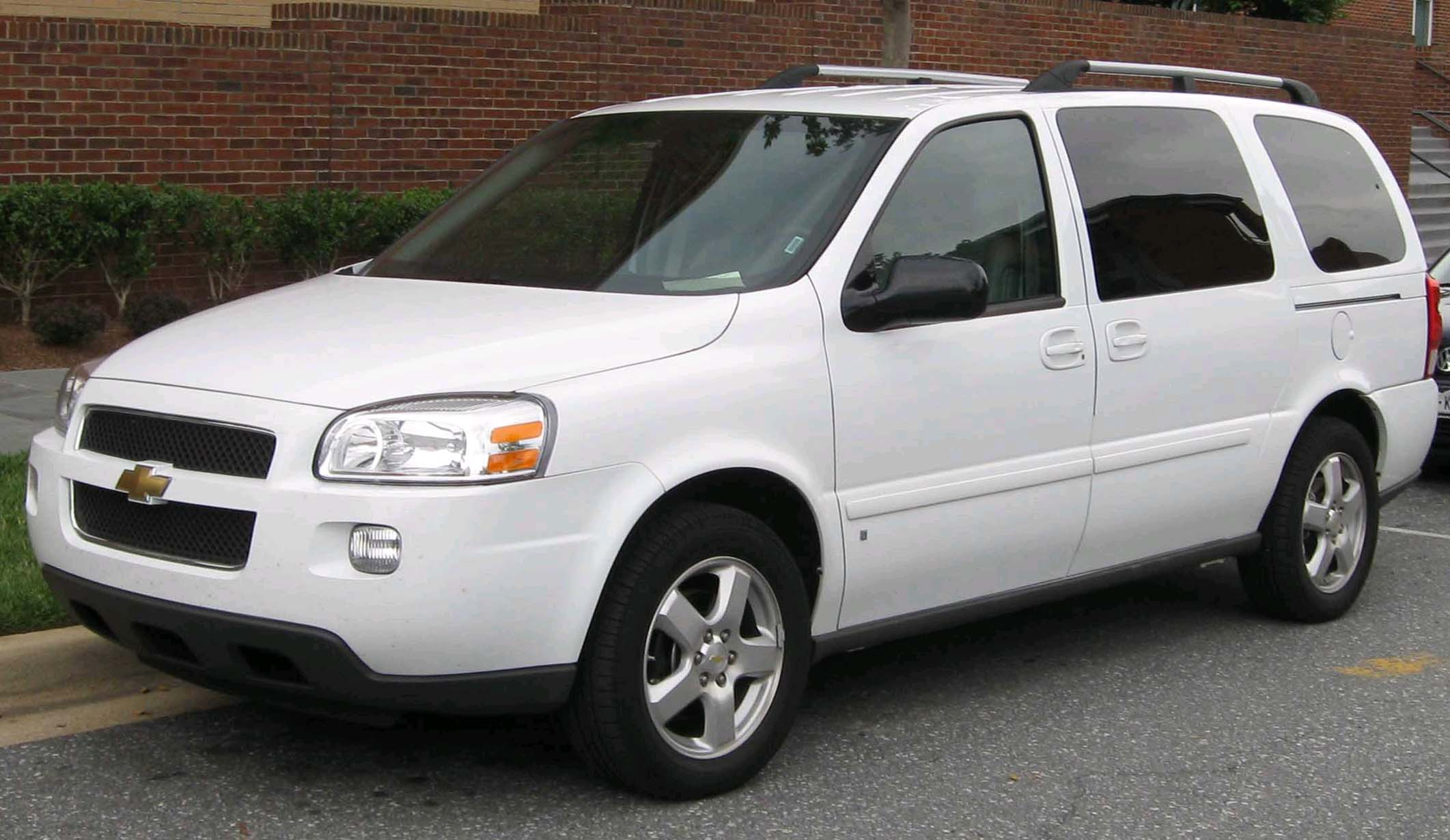
2005-2008 Chevrolet Uplander

The U-body was updated once again in 2004 for the 2005 model year, also known as the GMT201. These vans were referred to as "Crossover Sport Vans" (CSV) by General Motors, in reference to their SUV-inspired styling. North American vans were built in GM's plant in Doraville, Georgia. General Motors stopped minivan sales in the United States as of 2008. The Pontiac Montana and Chevrolet Uplander continued to be sold in Canada and Mexico for 2009. Production of the Buick GL8 continues in Shanghai, China.

==== 2005–2009 ====
The vehicles in this generation include:

- Buick GL8 (China only, produced until 2016)
- Buick Terraza (2005-2007)
- Chevrolet Uplander
- Pontiac Montana SV6 (2005-2006 in the US)
- Saturn Relay (2005-2007)

=== Fourth generation ===
In 2010, Shanghai GM introduced a new version (SGM258) of the Buick GL8 called GL8 Luxury Business Edition. The previous generation remains on sale as the Business Edition.

Prior to the car's release, a concept car called the Buick Business was shown at the 2009 Shanghai Auto Show.

=== Fifth generation ===
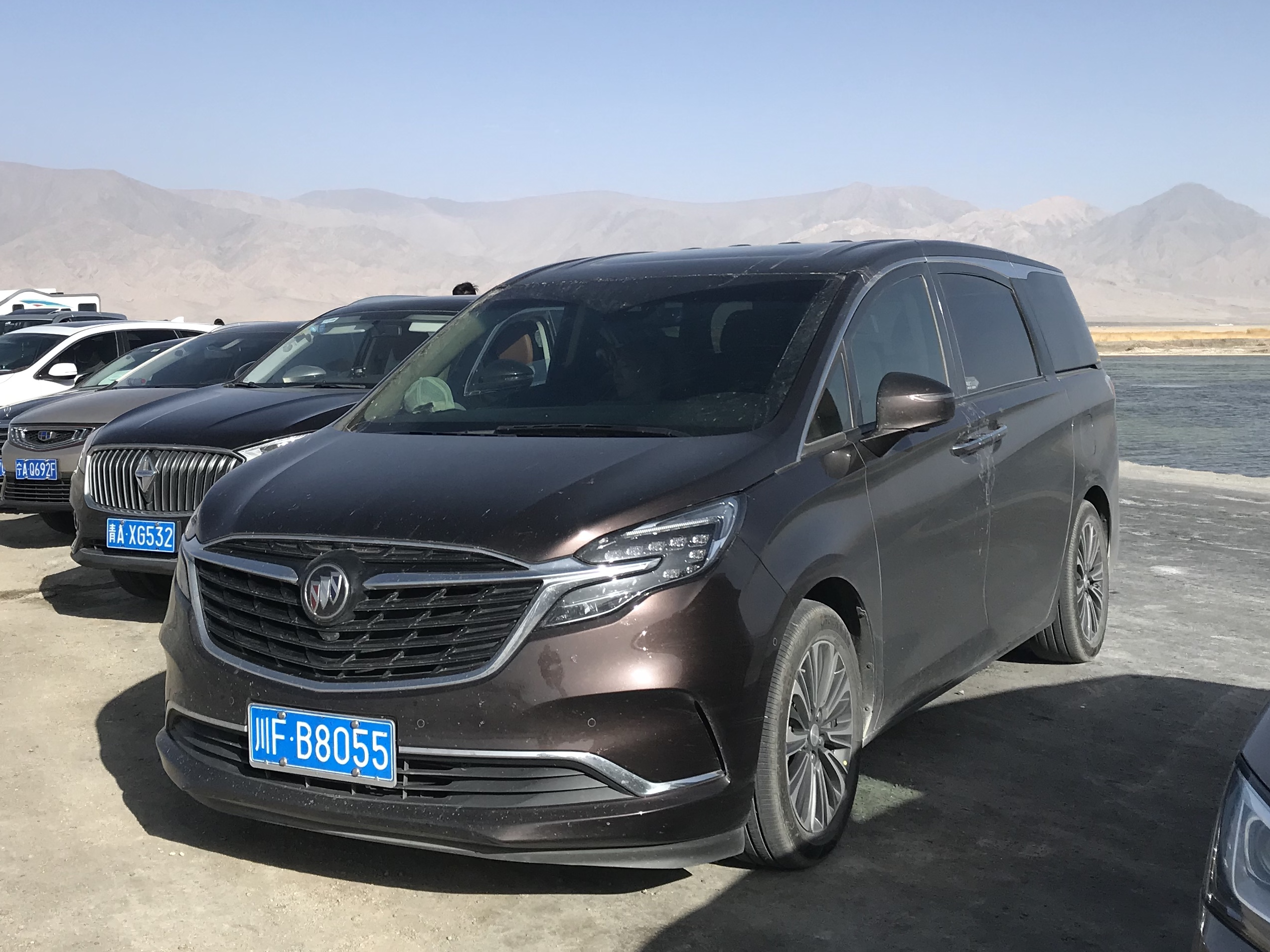
Buick GL8 III

In 2016, Shanghai GM introduced a new version (SGM358) of the Buick GL8 in 2 versions: ES and top of the line Avenir. The previous generation remains on sale as the Land Business Class. The exterior was completely redesigned but the platform was retained. However, the platform was updated with a new, more sophisticated independent rear suspension. The only engine is a 2.0-liter turbocharged inline-4 cylinder engine. This generation of GL8 is produced in Shanghai rather than Shenyang where the older generations of GL8 have been produced since 2004.

== Crossover SUVs ==
In 2001 General Motors decided to produce its first entry into the Crossover SUV category using a shortened U-body platform.

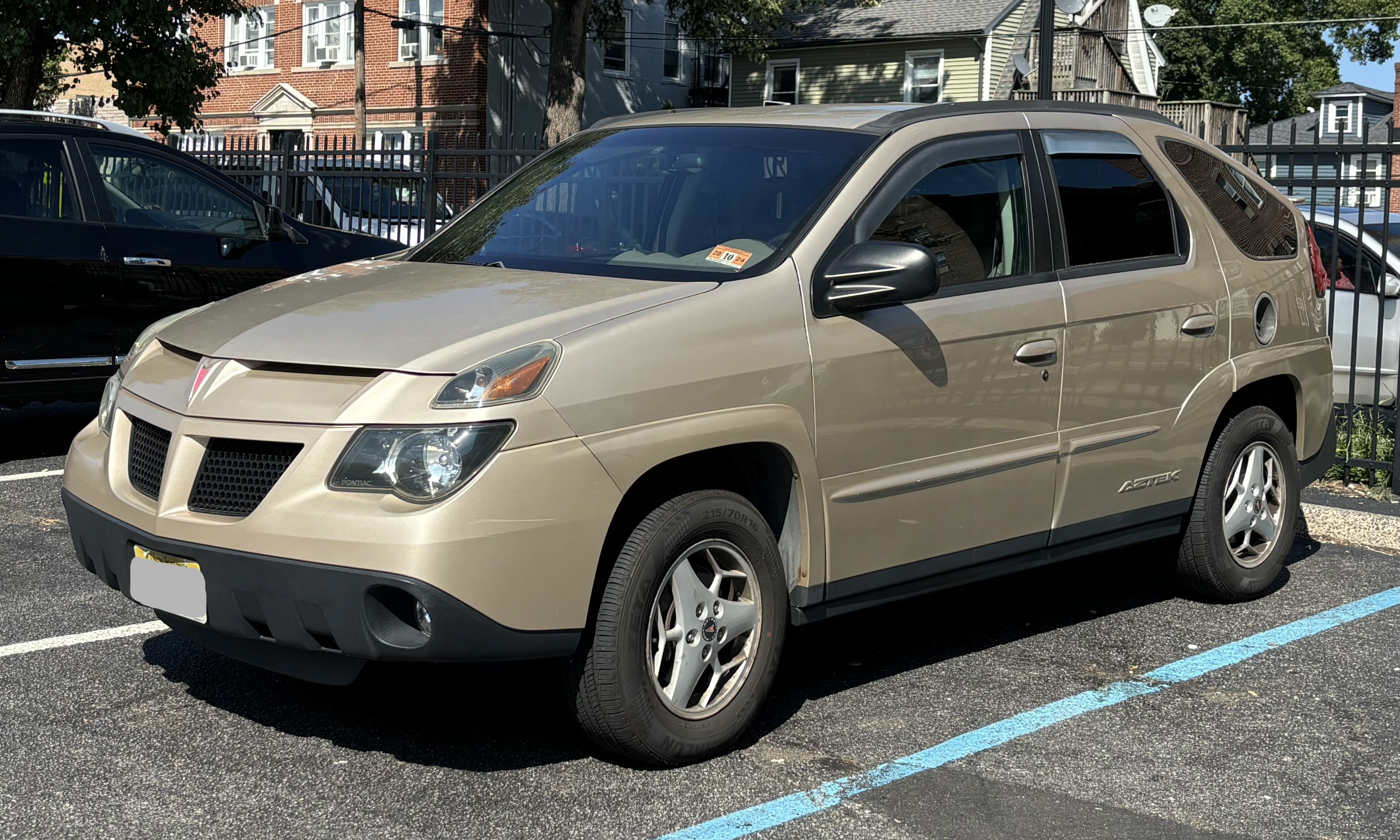
2002-2005 Pontiac Aztek

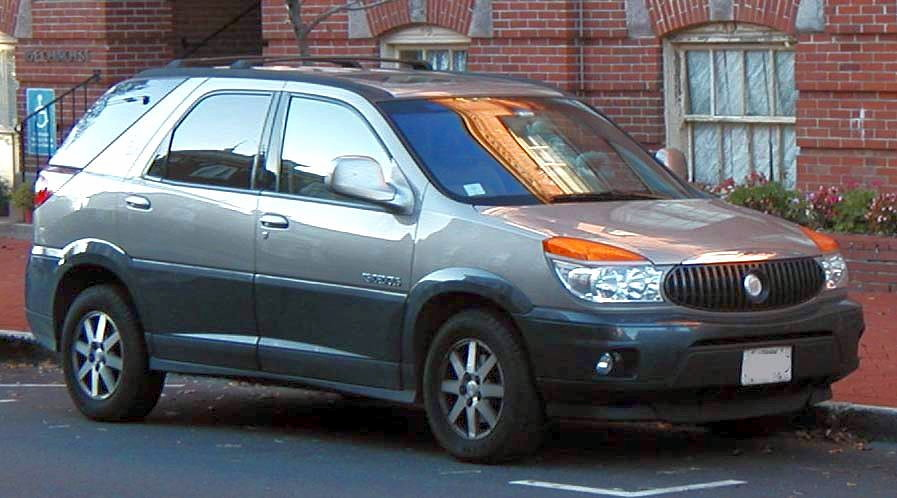
2002-2003 Buick Rendezvous

Vehicles:

- 2001–2005 Pontiac Aztek (GMT250)
- 2002–2007 Buick Rendezvous (GMT257)

== See also ==
- List of General Motors platforms
- GM GMT platform
- Doraville Assembly
