= Chevrolet Uplander =

Minivan by Chevrolet (2005–2009)

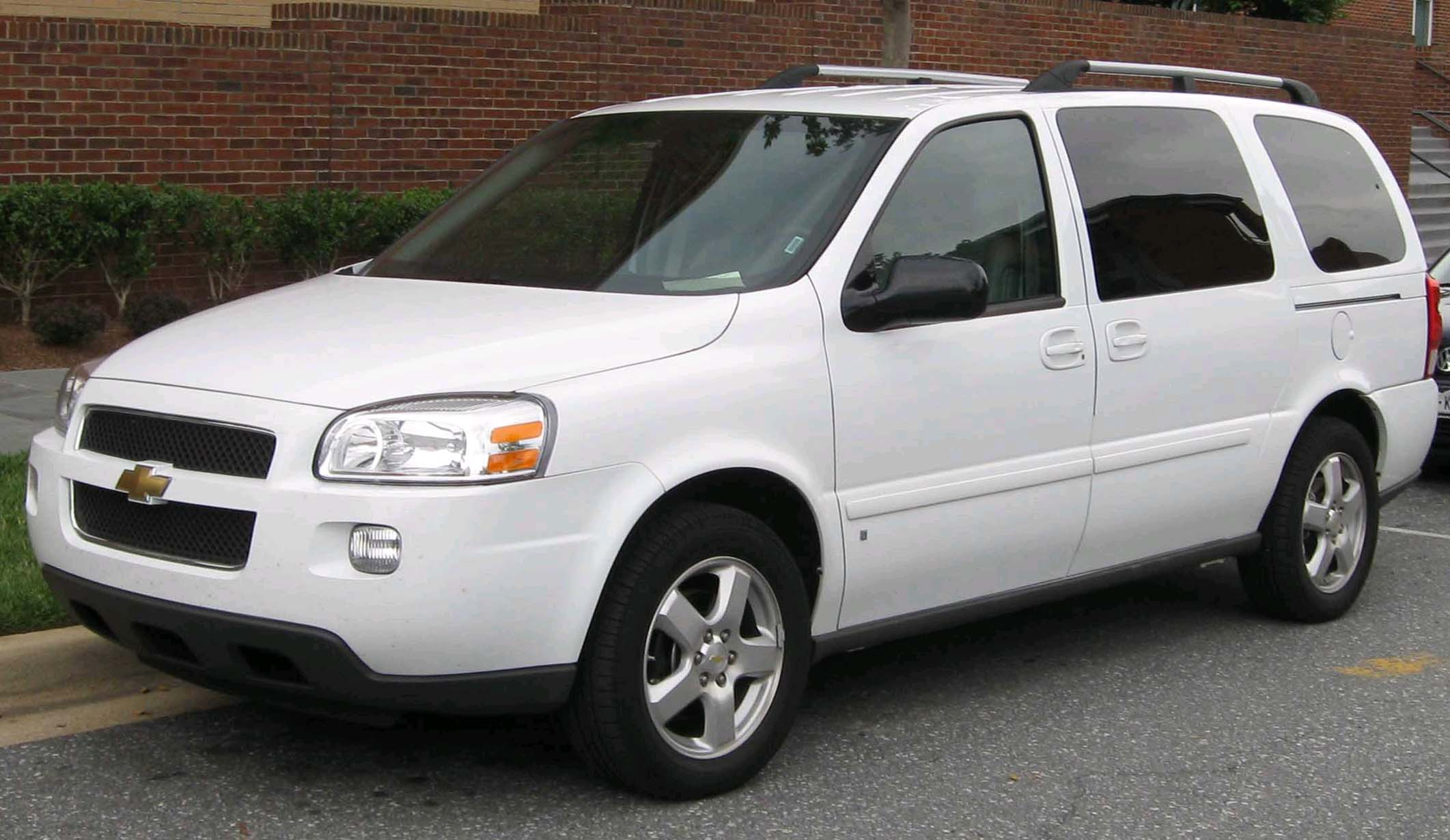

Overview
- Manufacturer: General Motors
- Production: June 20, 2004 – September 26, 2008
- Model years: 2005–2008 (United States); 2005–2009 (Canada and Mexico)
- Assembly: United States: Doraville, Georgia (Doraville Assembly)

Body and chassis
- Class: Minivan
- Body style: 4-door minivan
- Layout: Transverse front-engine, front-wheel drive / all-wheel drive
- Platform: U-body/GMT201
- Related: Buick GL8; Buick Terraza; Pontiac Montana SV6; Saturn Relay

Powertrain
- Engine: 3.5 L LX9 V6; 3.9 L LZ9 V6; 3.9 L LGD V6
- Transmission: 4-speed 4T65-E automatic

Dimensions
- Wheelbase: 113.0 in (2,870 mm) (SWB); 121.1 in (3,076 mm) (LWB)
- Length: 191.0 in (4,851 mm) (SWB); 204.3 in (5,189 mm) (LWB)
- Width: 72.0 in (1,829 mm)
- Height: 70.5 in (1,791 mm) (SWB); 72.0 in (1,829 mm) (LWB)
- Curb weight: 4,084 lb (1,852 kg) (SWB); 4,470 lb (2,028 kg) (LWB)

Chronology
- Predecessor: Chevrolet Venture; Chevrolet Astro (passenger van)
- Successor: Chevrolet Traverse

The Chevrolet Uplander is a minivan manufactured and marketed by the Chevrolet division of General Motors for model years of 2005–2009, replacing the Venture and the Astro. Marketed over a single generation, the Uplander was offered in short and long wheelbase variations — each with foldable and removable second and third row seating; a V-6 engine and 4-speed automatic transmission.

Heavily based on GM's predecessor minivans, the Uplander was initially marketed with those vehicles, the Venture and Astro. The minivan and its rebadged variants, the Saturn Relay, Buick Terraza, and Pontiac Montana SV6, were manufactured at GM's Doraville Assembly and were discontinued in 2008 when GM left the minivan market, ended production and closed the Doraville Assembly plant.

The Uplander was marketed in the United States, Canada, Chile, Mexico, and the Middle East.

== Year to year changes ==
2005: The Uplander was initially offered with a 3.5 L High Value 3500 LX9 V6 generating 200 hp (149 kW) and 220 lb·ft (298 N·m).
2006: A 3.9 L LZ9 V6, with 240 hp (179 kW) and 240 lb·ft (332 Nm) torque, was added as an option. Wheels were changed from a five-lugnut design to a six-lugnut design. The GM logo was added to the front doors. A short-wheelbase model became available, but only for the fleet market.
2007: The 3.5 L V6 was dropped, leaving the 3.9 L as the base engine. Consequently, the optional AWD system was also dropped, since it could not handle the torque of the 3.9 L engine. A flex-fuel version of the 3.9 L V6 also became available for 2007.
2008: The Uplander's last year for the United States, although production continued for export to Canada and Mexico up to the 2009 model year. The final vehicle (a 2009 Canadian-specification short wheelbase Pontiac Montana SV6 in Liquid Silver Metallic with a roof rack) rolled off the Doraville assembly line on September 26, 2008.

== Safety ==
According to the Insurance Institute for Highway Safety, the Chevrolet Uplander has an improved crash test rating than its predecessor, the Venture. The Uplander, Pontiac Montana SV6, Buick Terraza, and Saturn Relay earned the highest rating of "Good" in the IIHS offset frontal crash test but was rated only "Acceptable" and "Poor" in the IIHS side crash test with and without the optional side airbags, respectively.

== Sales ==
Calendar year	US	Canada	Mexico
2004	3,948		
2005	72,980	21,271	5,438
2006	58,699	21,047	5,249
2007	69,885	18,999	3,821
2008	40,456	16,133	2,467
2009	1,758	10,433	405
2010	76	30	10

== Gallery ==
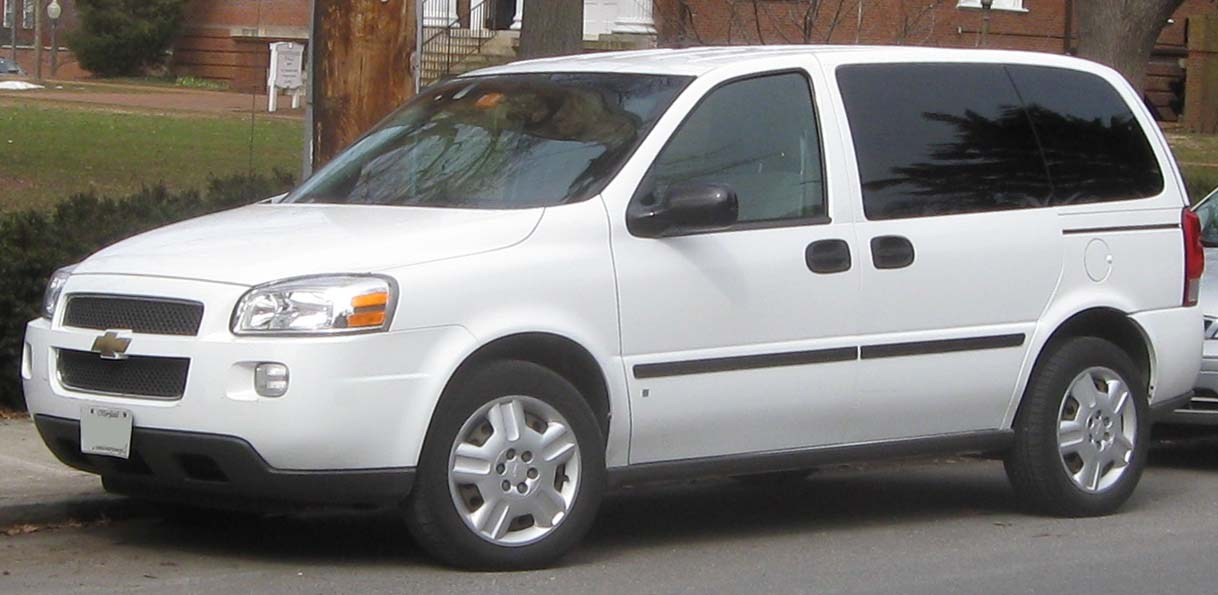
Chevrolet Uplander LS SWB

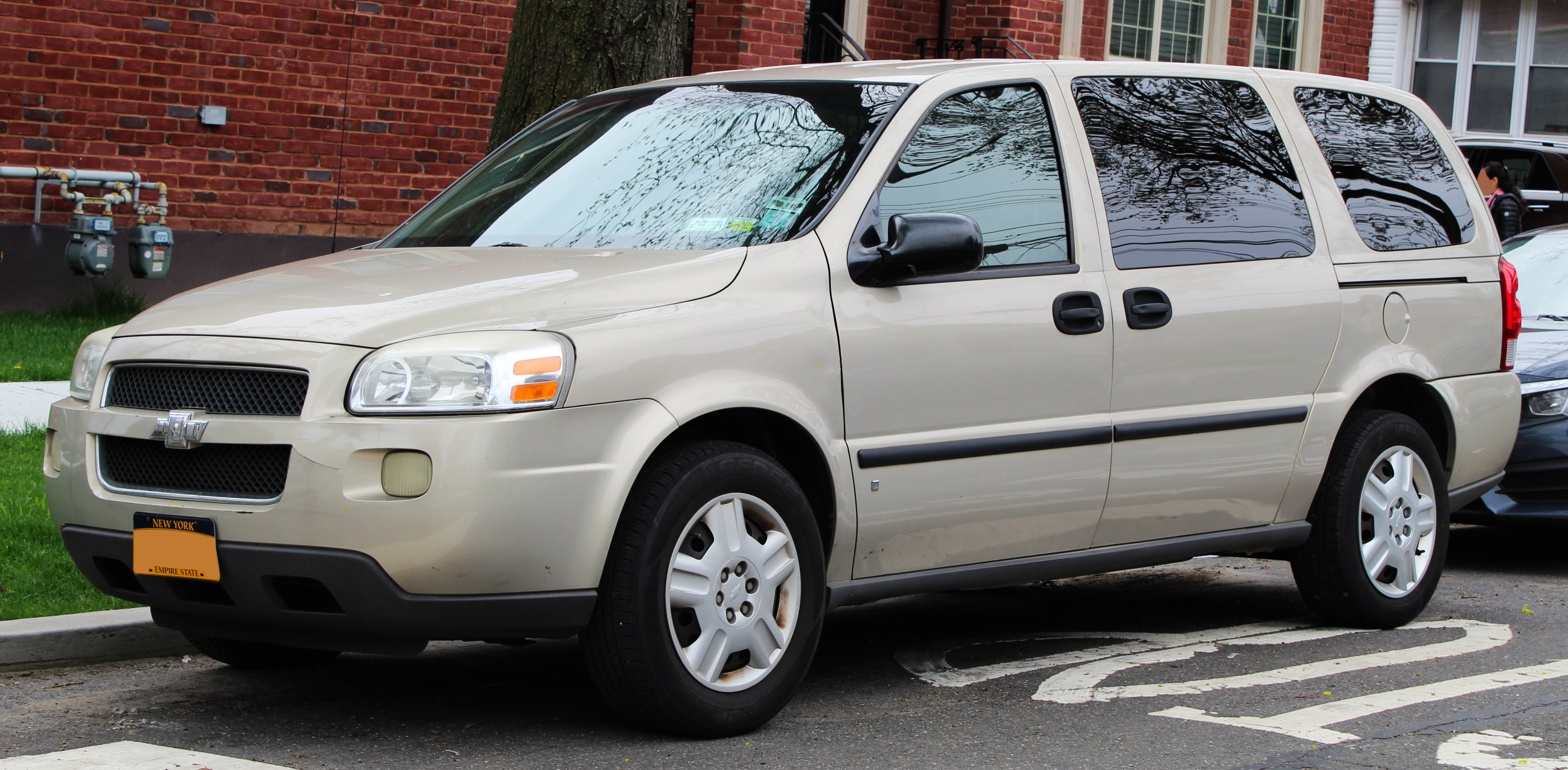
Chevrolet Uplander LS LWB

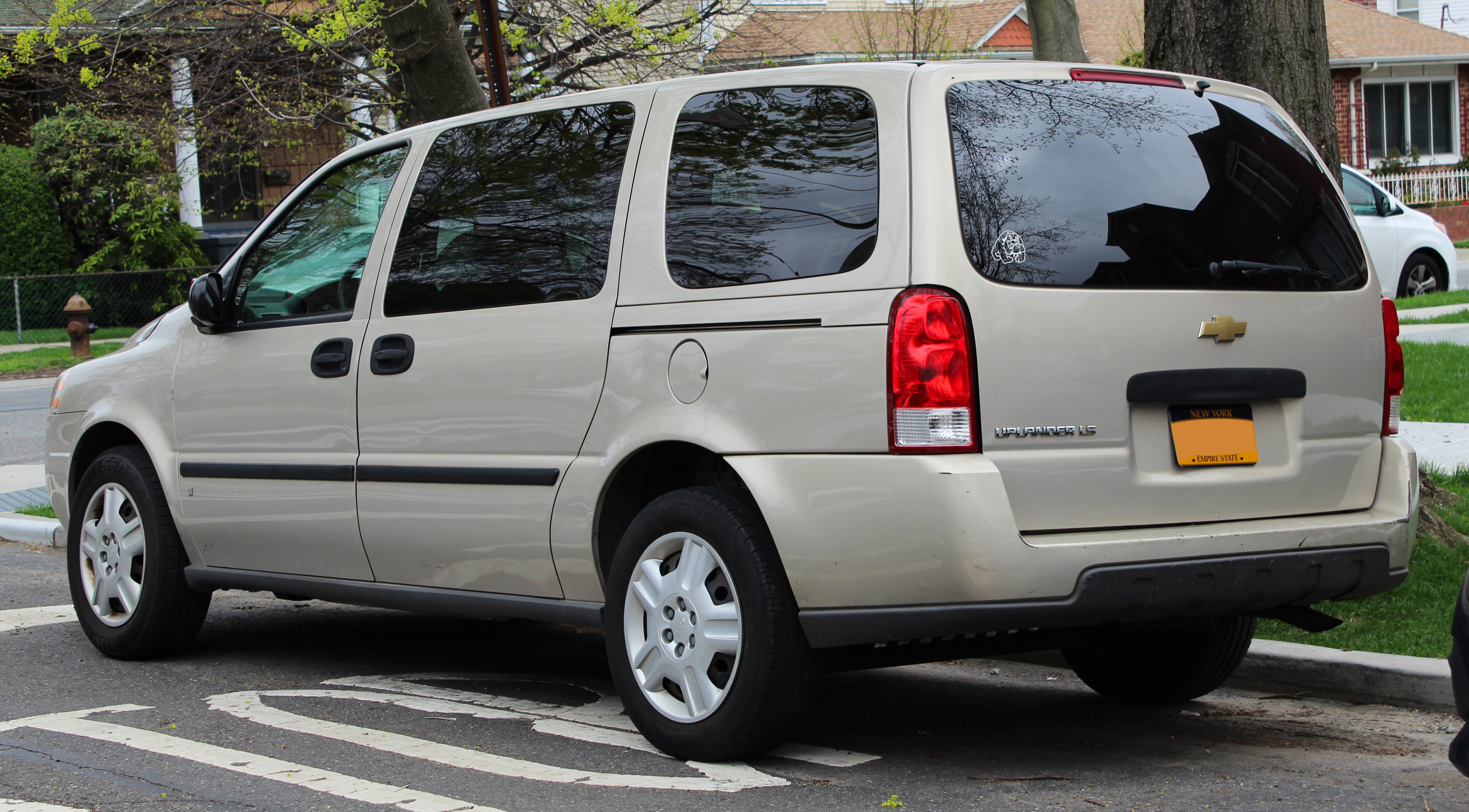
Chevrolet Uplander LS LWB (rear)
