= GM High Value engine =

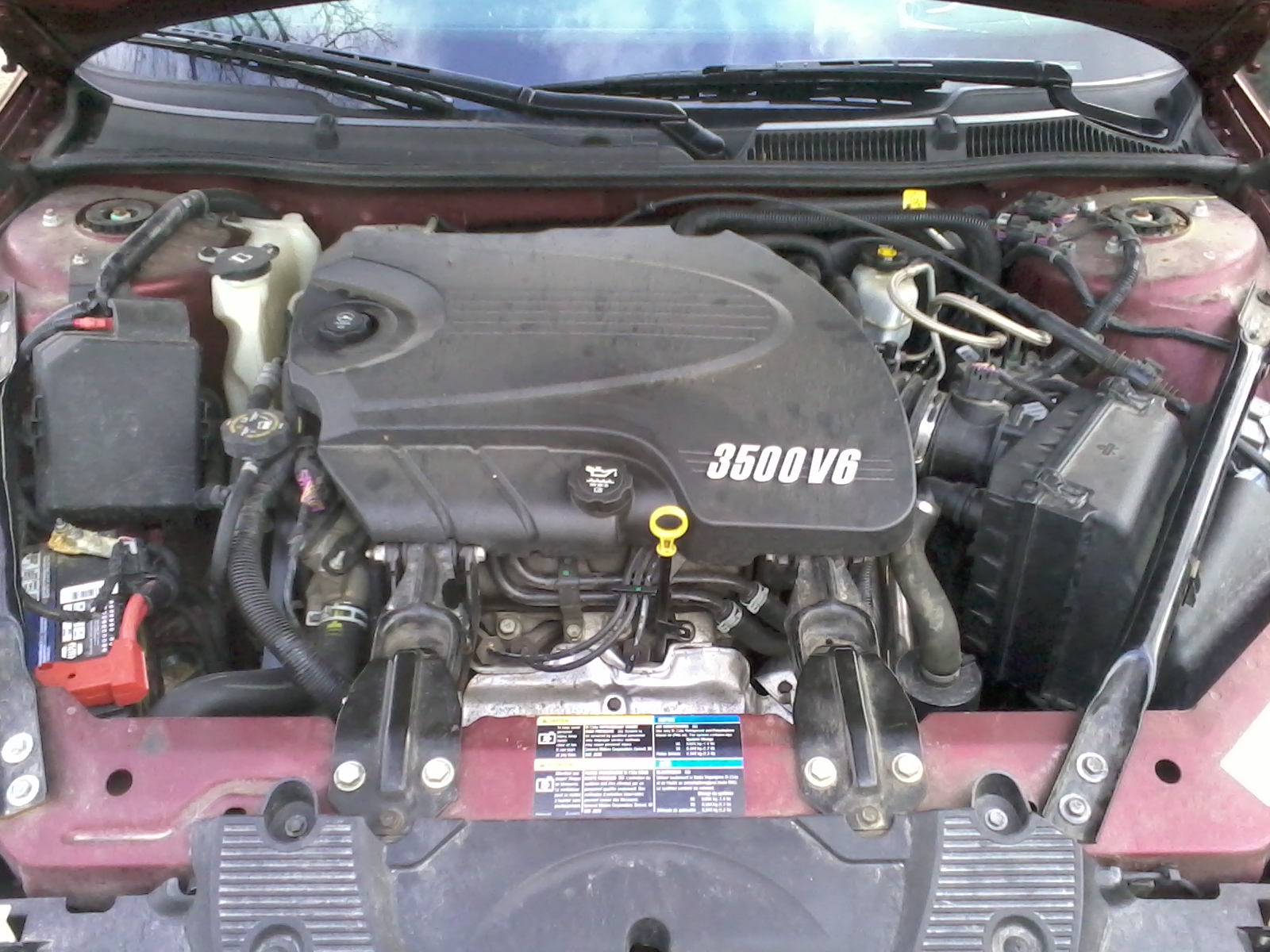
- 2008 Chevrolet Impala 3.5L engine

Overview
- Manufacturer: General Motors
- Production: 2004–2011

Layout
- Configuration: Naturally aspirated 60° V6
- Displacement: 3.5 L; 213.5 cu in (3,498 cc); 3.5 L; 214.2 cu in (3,510 cc); 3.9 L; 236.8 cu in (3,880 cc)
- Cylinder bore: 94 mm (3.7 in); 99 mm (3.9 in)
- Piston stroke: 76 mm (2.99 in); 84 mm (3.31 in)
- Cylinder block material: Cast iron
- Cylinder head material: Aluminum
- Valvetrain: OHV with VVT
- Compression ratio: 9.8:1

Combustion
- Fuel system: Sequential multi-port fuel injection
- Fuel type: Gasoline, E85
- Oil system: Wet sump
- Cooling system: Water-cooled

Output
- Power output: 196–242 hp (146–180 kW)
- Torque output: 213–242 lb⋅ft (289–328 N⋅m)

Emissions
- Emissions target standard: California emission standards
- Emissions control systems: Catalytic converter

Chronology
- Predecessor: GM 60° V6 engine; Buick V6 engine
- Successor: GM High Feature engine

The High Value engine family from General Motors is a group of cam-in-block or overhead valve V6 engines. These engines feature cast iron blocks and aluminum heads, and use the same 60° vee bank as the 60° V6 family they are based on, but the new 99 mm (3.90 in) bore required offsetting the bores by 1.5 mm (0.059 in) away from the engine center line. These engines (aside from the LX9) are the first cam-in-block engines to implement variable valve timing, and won the 2006 Breakthrough Award from Popular Mechanics for this innovation. For the 2007 model year, the 3900 engine featured optional displacement on demand or "Active Fuel Management" which deactivates a bank of cylinders under light load to increase highway fuel economy. It was rumored that GM would produce a 3-valve design, but that never came to be. These engines were produced primarily at the GM factory in Tonawanda, New York, and at the Ramos Arizpe engine plant in Mexico. The assembly line for this engine was manufactured by Hirata Corporation at its powertrain facility in Kumamoto, Japan.

As of the 2012 model year, GM no longer sells these engines in any U.S. market vehicles.

== 3.5 ==
These engines should not be confused with the 3.5L DOHC LX5 (Shortstar) V6 engine.

=== LX9 ===
The LX9 3500 is an OHV engine based on the 3400 V6. Bore and stroke are 94 mm × 84 mm (3.70 in × 3.31 in), for a displacement of 3.5 L; 213.5 cu in (3,498 cc).

According to a GM press release from October 2002, the 3500 V6 offered improved performance and fuel efficiency, as well as reduced emissions and NVH compared to the 3400 V6. The 3500 V6 featured an updated powertrain control module, electronic throttle control, fuel injection system, exhaust manifold, catalytic converter, accessory drive system, and improved cooling and sealing systems.

Power output ranges from 196 hp (146 kW) to 201 hp (150 kW) at 5600 rpm, and torque ranges from 213 lb⋅ft (289 N⋅m) to 221 lb⋅ft (300 N⋅m) at 4000 rpm.

Applications:

- 2005–2006 Buick Terraza/Chevrolet Uplander/Pontiac Montana SV6/Saturn Relay
- 2004–2006 Chevrolet Malibu/Chevrolet Malibu Maxx
- 2005–2006 Pontiac G6 Sedan / Coupe
- 2006–2007 Buick Rendezvous
- 2006 Pontiac G6 GT Convertible

=== LZ4 ===
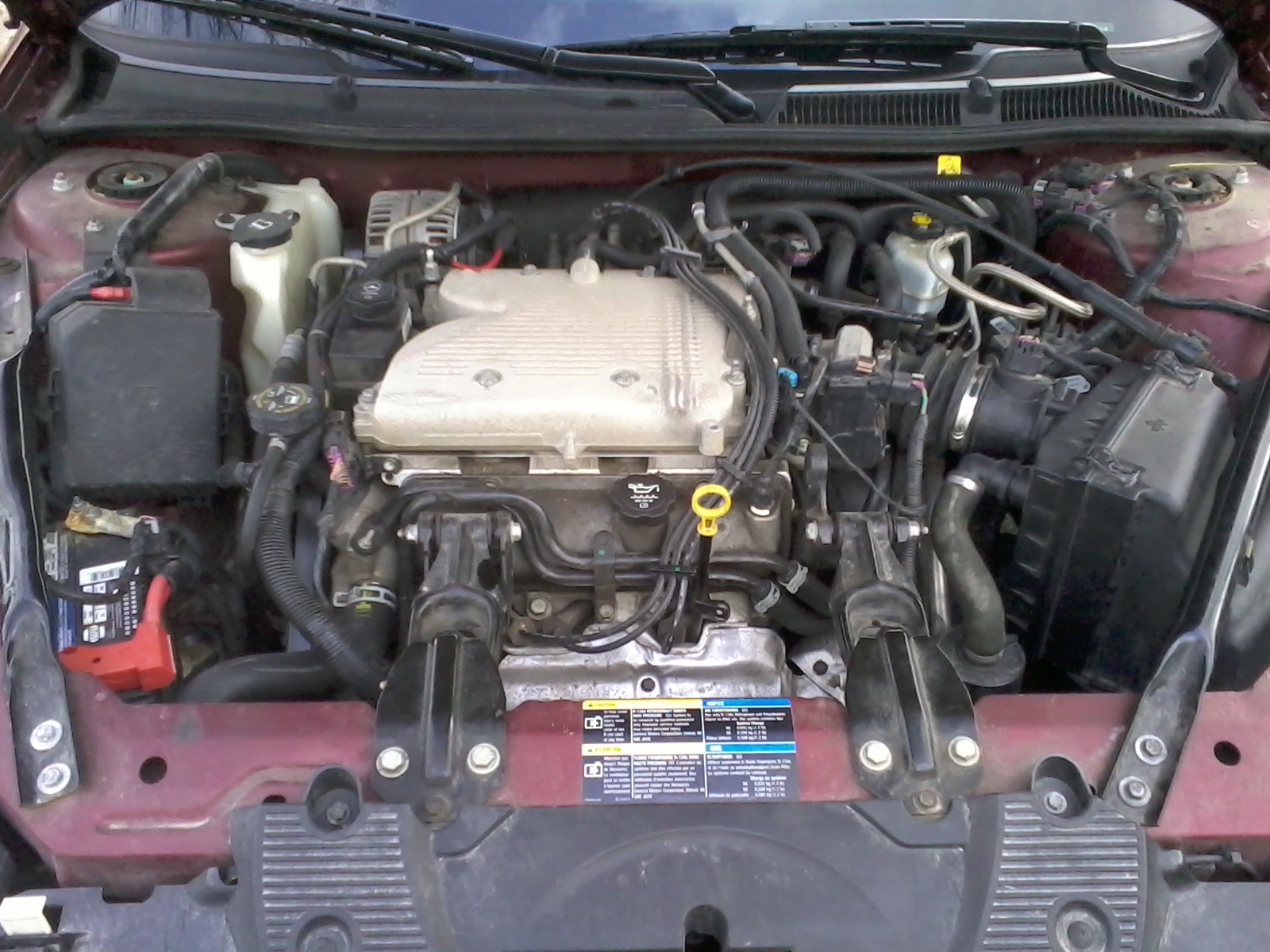
LZ4 engine without plastic cover

The LZ4 3500 is an OHV engine that uses a block similar to the 3.9L LZ9 V6. It was introduced for the 2006 model year Impala and Monte Carlo.

Bore is the same 99 mm (3.90 in), but the stroke is reduced to 76 mm (2.99 in) for a displacement of 3.5 L; 214.2 cu in (3,510 cc).

It includes continuously variable cam timing (fixed overlap).

Output is 211 hp (157 kW) at 5800 rpm and 214 lb⋅ft (290 N⋅m) at 4000 rpm.

Horsepower rating changed for the 2007 model year to 224 hp (167 kW) at 5800 rpm and 220 lb⋅ft (298 N⋅m) torque at 4000 rpm.

The Chevrolet Malibu, Pontiac G6, and Saturn Aura came equipped with this engine for 2007 (previously, the Malibu and G6 had the non-VVT 201 hp (150 kW) 3.5 L LX9).

In 2008, the SAE horsepower rating was dropped to 219 hp (163 kW), keeping torque as is. On Pontiac G6 convertible models, horsepower was rated at 217 hp (162 kW).

Applications:

- 2006–2009 Chevrolet Impala
- 2006–2007 Chevrolet Monte Carlo
- 2008–2010 Chevrolet Malibu Fleet
- 2007 Chevrolet Malibu Sedan/ Maxx
- 2007–2009 Saturn Aura
- 2007–2010 Pontiac G6
- 2008–2010 Saturn Vue XE AWD LZ4 (Note: Only vehicle to have used the GM METRIC bellhousing for 6T70)

Note: GM often refers to this engine in its literature as a "3.5L V6 with Variable Valve Timing."

=== LZE ===
The LZE 3500 is an OHV flexible-fuel engine based on the 3.5L LZ4 V6 (it can use either plain gasoline or E85) and includes continuously variable cam timing (fixed overlap). Bore and stroke are 99 mm × 76 mm (3.90 in × 2.99 in), for a displacement of 3.5 L; 214.2 cu in (3,510 cc). Output is 211 hp (157 kW) at 5800 rpm and 216 lb⋅ft (293 N⋅m) at 4000 rpm.

Applications:

- 2006–2011 Chevrolet Impala
- 2006–2007 Chevrolet Monte Carlo
- 2009–2010 Pontiac G6

== 3.9 ==
Bore and stroke are 99 mm × 84 mm (3.90 in × 3.31 in) for a displacement of 3.9 L; 236.8 cu in (3,880 cc).

=== LZ9 ===
The LZ9 3900 has roller rocker arms, a variable length intake manifold, and Variable Cam Timing, a novelty on a pushrod engine. A computer-controlled plenum divider, along with the VVT cam function, improves efficiency across a broader RPM range.

It produces up to 240 hp (179 kW) and 240 lb⋅ft (325 N⋅m) of torque, with a wide torque curve. At least 90% of the maximum torque output is available from 1500 rpm to 5500 rpm.

Applications:

- 2006 Pontiac G6 GTP Sedan / Coupe / Convertible
- 2007 Pontiac G6 GT Sport Package Sedan / Coupe
- 2007–2009 Pontiac G6 GT Sport Package Convertible
- 2006–2007 Chevrolet Malibu SS
- 2006 Chevrolet Impala/Monte Carlo (242 hp (180 kW)/242 lb⋅ft (328 N⋅m))
- 2006–2009 Buick Terraza/Chevrolet Uplander/Pontiac Montana SV6/Saturn Relay
- 2009–2011 Buick Lucerne (227 hp (169 kW) (219 hp (163 kW) in California-emissions states))

=== LGD ===
The LGD 3900 is a flexible-fuel version of the LZ9, and like its 3.5L LZE counterpart, it can run on E85, pure gasoline, or any mixture of the two. This is the last version of the 3900 V6. The LGD was not available with Active Fuel Management. Output is slightly reduced at 230 horsepower at 5700 rpm and 235 lb-ft of torque at 3200 rpm.

Applications:

- 2007–2009 Buick Terraza/Chevrolet Uplander/Pontiac Montana SV6
- 2009–2011 Buick Lucerne/Chevrolet Impala
- 2007 Saturn Relay (fleet only)

=== LZ8 and LZG ===
The LZ8 3900 has the same Variable Cam Timing technology as the LZ9. The 2007 model year introduces the Active Fuel Management system (formerly known as Displacement on Demand), which can turn off a bank of cylinders under a light load for increased fuel economy. Output is slightly lower than the LZ9 at 233 hp (174 kW) and 240 lb⋅ft (325 N⋅m). For 2008, it was replaced by the LZG 3900, a flexible-fuel version of the LZ8.

Applications:

- 2007 Chevrolet Impala (LZ8)
- 2008 Chevrolet Impala (LZG)

The LZ8 was replaced by the LGD for 2009.
