= Saturn Relay =

Minivan

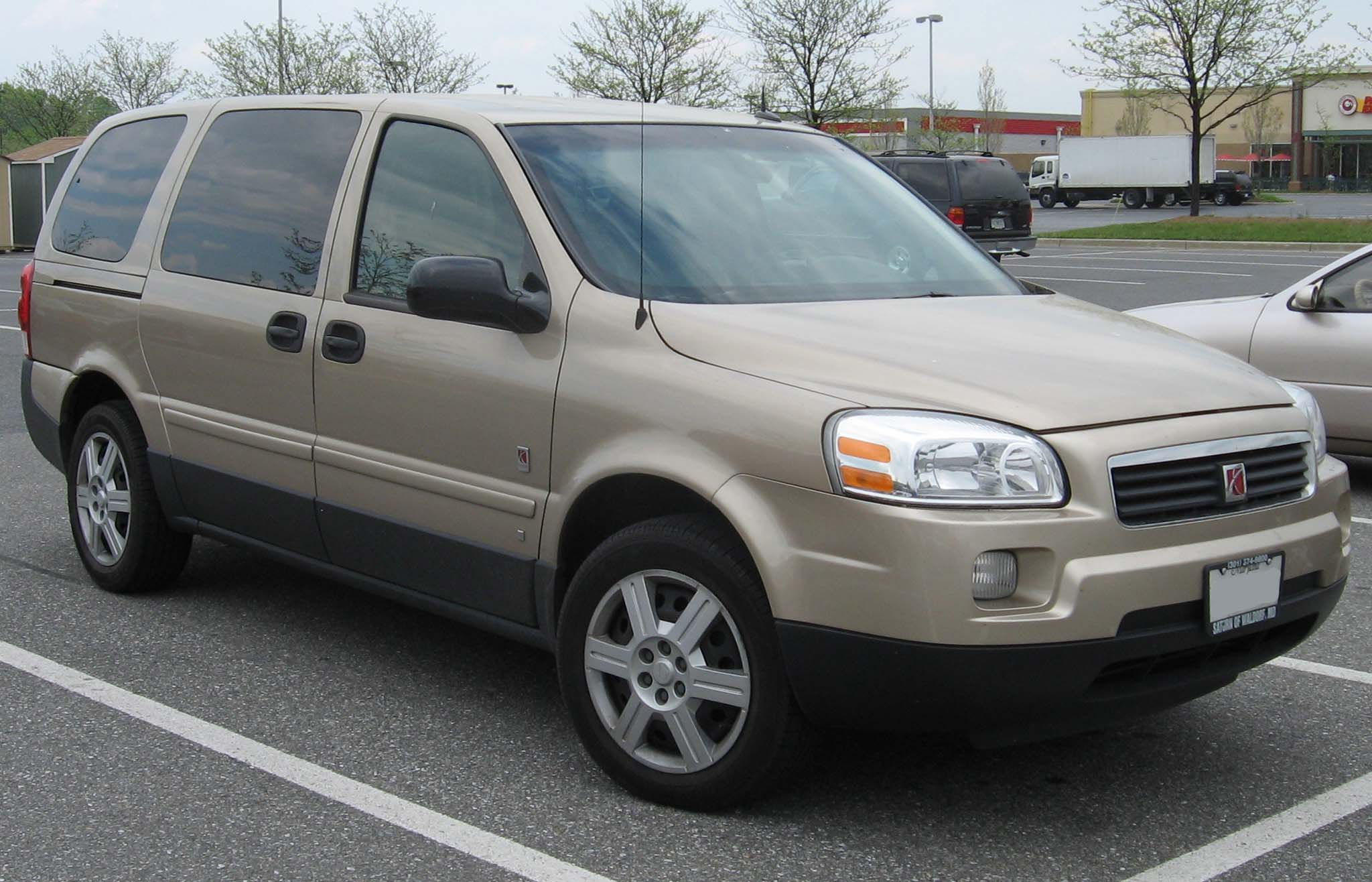

Overview
- Manufacturer: General Motors
- Production: June 20, 2004 – November 17, 2006
- Model years: 2005–2007
- Assembly: United States: Doraville, Georgia (Doraville Assembly)

Body and chassis
- Class: Minivan
- Body style: 4-door minivan
- Layout: Transverse front-engine, front-wheel drive / all-wheel drive
- Platform: U-body/GMT201
- Related: Buick GL8; Buick Terraza; Chevrolet Uplander; Pontiac Montana SV6; Chevrolet Venture; Oldsmobile Silhouette

Powertrain
- Engine: 3.5 L LX9 V6 (gasoline); 3.9 L LZ9 V6 (gasoline); 3.9 L LGD V6 (gasoline/E85)
- Transmission: 4-speed 4T65-E automatic

Dimensions
- Wheelbase: 121.1 in (3,076 mm)
- Length: 204.9 in (5,204 mm)
- Width: 72.0 in (1,829 mm)
- Height: 2005: 72.0 in (1,829 mm); 2006–07: 68.6 in (1,742 mm)
- Curb weight: 4,426 lb (2,008 kg)

Chronology
- Predecessor: Oldsmobile Silhouette
- Successor: Saturn Outlook

The Saturn Relay is a minivan that was manufactured by the Saturn division of General Motors from 2005-2007 model years. It was a rebadged variant of the Buick Terraza, the Chevrolet Uplander, and the Pontiac Montana SV6, all manufactured in Doraville, Georgia.

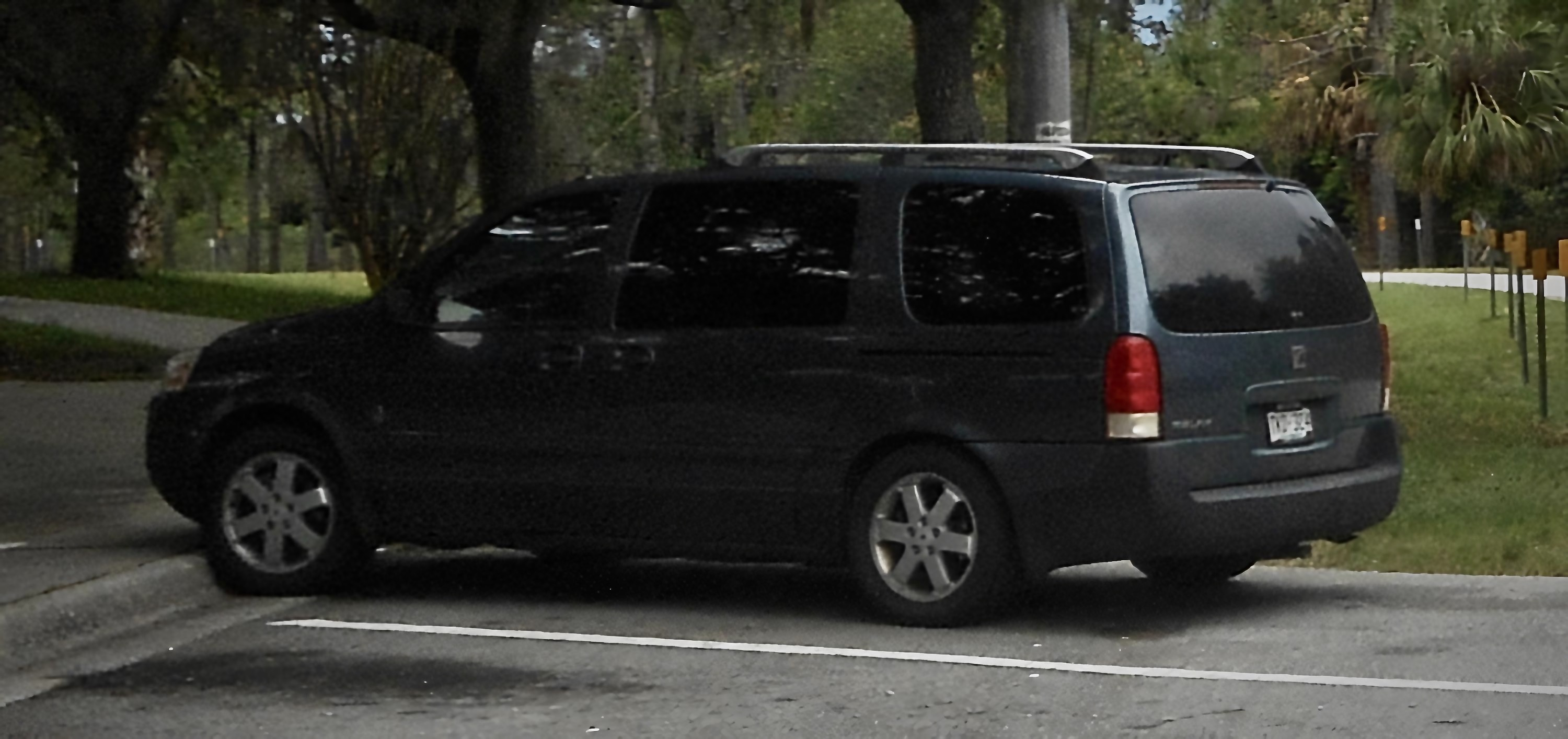
Saturn Relay rear

The Relay was introduced with a 3.5L LX9 V6 that generates 200 hp (149 kW) and 220 lb⋅ft (298 N⋅m) of torque, allowing for 0–60 mph (97 km/h) in the 9-second range. For 2006, a 3.9L LZ9 V6, with 240 hp (179 kW) and 240 lb⋅ft (325 N⋅m) of torque, was added as an option, which delivered faster acceleration and better response than the 3.5L engine. For 2007, the 3.5L V6 was dropped, leaving the 3.9L as the base engine. Consequently, the optional AWD system was also dropped.

The Relay scored three "Good" ratings (the highest possible score) and two "Acceptable" ratings (the second highest possible score) in Insurance Institute for Highway Safety (IIHS) crash tests. In terms of gas mileage, the Relay is rated at 19 miles per US gallon (12 L/100 km; 23 mpg_{‑imp}) city and 25 miles per US gallon (9.4 L/100 km; 30 mpg_{‑imp}) highway.

The Relay started at US$22,850. There were three available trim levels: 1, 2, and 3. The Relay 3 was available in front-wheel drive and in all-wheel drive. The Relay seats up to seven passengers via folding/removable second-row captain's chairs and a 50/50 third-row bench. The third-row bench folds flat, but did not fold entirely into the floor. OnStar assistance and a DVD rear entertainment system came standard on all Relays. A navigation system was optional on Relay 3s. Side airbags were optional on the Relay. The Relay was discontinued after the 2007 model year and was replaced by the 2007 Saturn Outlook.

== Changes ==
=== 2005 ===
The Saturn Relay was introduced along with the other GM minivans riding on the same platform.

=== 2006 ===
For 2006, the Relay received an optional 3.9L V6 engine, but only in the front-wheel-drive Relay 3. The wheels now have six lugs instead of five. The Relay 3 also featured an optional navigation radio, as well as standard first-row side impact air bags, traction control, and power-sliding passenger-side door. Second-row side-impact air bags became available with captain's chairs.

Starting with the 2006 model year, GM badges were added to the front doors, along with many other GM vehicles.

=== 2007 ===
The final model year of the Relay. The GM logos had been dropped from the front doors. The 3.5L V6 was dropped, leaving the 3.9L as the base engine, with flex-fuel capability later becoming optional but only for fleet applications. Consequently, the optional AWD system was also dropped, since it could not handle the torque of the 3.9L engine.

The Relay 1 trim level was introduced as the base trim level, and the Relay 3 now included a dual-zone manual climate control system with individual settings for the first row. The Relay also received redesigned 17-inch wheels and StabiliTrak electronic stability control.

The Relay was discontinued after the 2007 model year. The Doraville Assembly plant closed in September 2008. The final 2007 Relay rolled off the line on November 17, 2006. The Relay was replaced by the Saturn Outlook, an 8-passenger crossover SUV riding on the General Motors Lambda platform.

== Sales ==
Calendar year	U.S. Sales
2004	1,563
2005	15,758
2006	7,171
2007	1,474
2008	163

== See also ==
- Relay (disambiguation)
