= Chevrolet Lumina APV =

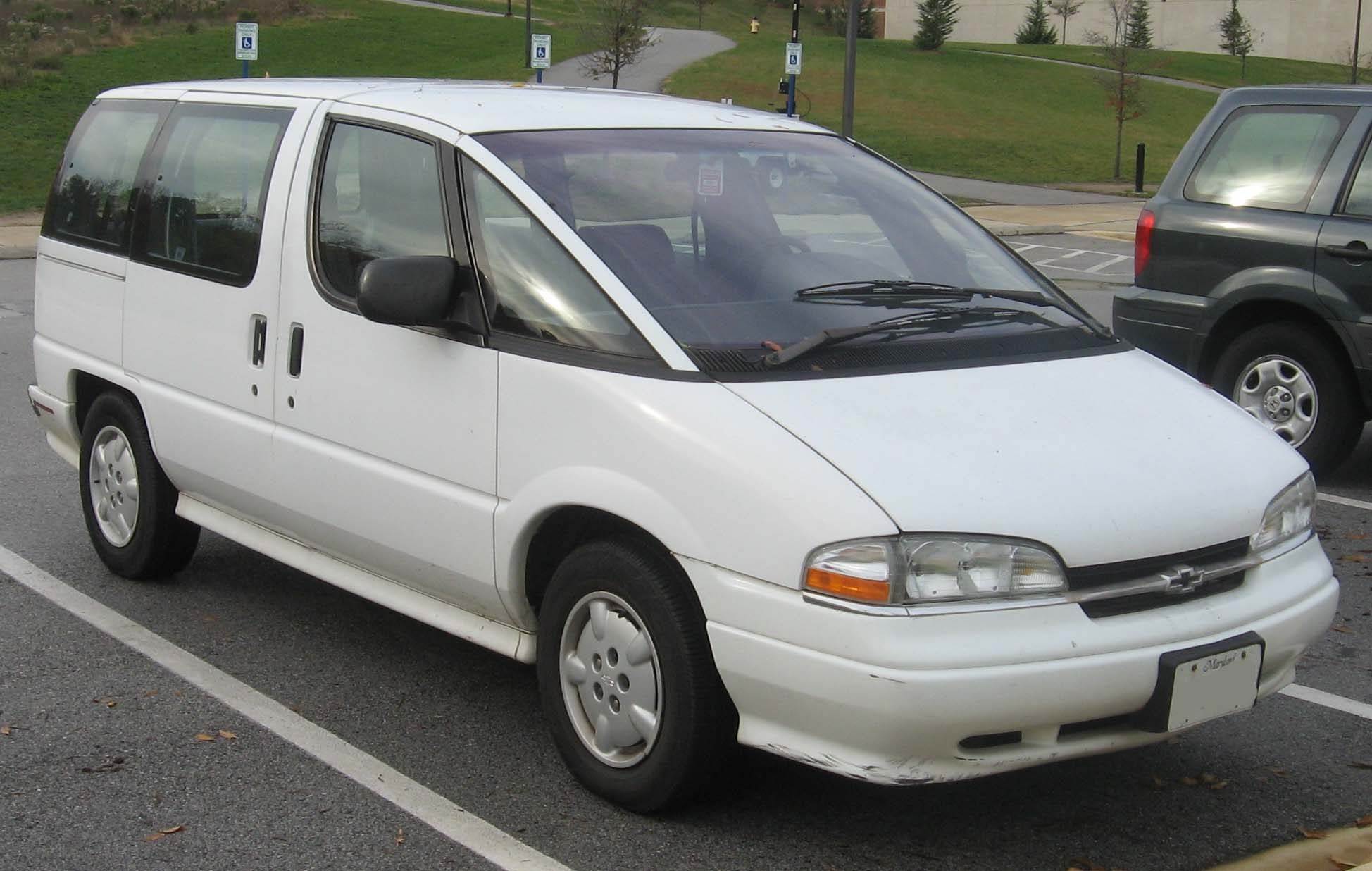

Overview
- Manufacturer: Chevrolet
- Also called: Chevrolet Lumina Minivan (1994–1996)
- Production: 1989–June 27, 1996
- Assembly: North Tarrytown, New York, U.S.
- Designer: Dick Ruzzin

Body and chassis
- Class: Minivan
- Body style: 3-door van
- Layout: Transverse front-engine, front-wheel drive
- Platform: GM U platform: GMT199
- Related: Oldsmobile Silhouette; Pontiac Trans Sport

Powertrain
- Engine: 3.1 L LG6 V6; 3.4 L LA1 V6; 3.8 L L27 V6
- Transmission: 3-speed 3T40 automatic 4-speed 4T60-E automatic

Dimensions
- Wheelbase: 109.8 in (2,789 mm)
- Length: 1990–93: 194.2 in (4,933 mm); 1993–96: 191.5 in (4,864 mm)
- Width: 73.9 in (1,877 mm)
- Height: 1990–92: 65.2 in (1,656 mm); 1993–97: 65.7 in (1,669 mm)
- Curb weight: 3599–3899 lb (1632–1769 kg)

Chronology
- Predecessor: Chevrolet Celebrity (station wagon)
- Successor: Chevrolet Venture

The Chevrolet Lumina APV is a minivan that was produced by the Chevrolet division of General Motors. Launched as the first front-wheel drive minivan sold by Chevrolet, the Lumina APV was sold in a single generation from the 1990 to 1996 model years. Marketed alongside the Pontiac Trans Sport and Oldsmobile Silhouette, the Lumina APV competed against the Dodge Grand Caravan/Plymouth Grand Voyager, the extended-length Ford Aerostar, and the Mazda MPV.

Introduced a year before the second-generation Chrysler minivans, the Lumina APV was the first American-market minivan to adopt the form factor of the Dodge Caravan and Plymouth Voyager. Though manufactured on a model-specific chassis, the Lumina APV was front-wheel drive, deriving its powertrain from GM sedans. While longer than the Chevrolet Astro, the passenger-oriented Lumina APV was smaller inside and had a lower weight rating.

During its production, the Lumina APV and its Pontiac and Oldsmobile counterparts were assembled at the North Tarrytown Assembly facility, becoming the final vehicles produced there prior to its closure. For 1997, Chevrolet adopted a distinct nameplate for its front-wheel drive minivan, replacing the Lumina APV with the Chevrolet Venture.

== Background ==
In response to the first-generation Chrysler minivans, General Motors introduced the rear-wheel drive Chevrolet Astro (and GMC Safari) for the 1985 model year. Sized closely to the short-wheelbase Chevrolet Van, the Astro was marketed in both passenger and cargo van configurations.

In 1986, GM unveiled the Pontiac Trans Sport concept vehicle, largely serving as a preview of the APV model lines. While far more radical in body design, the 1986 Trans Sport concept was the first minivan to adopt the front-wheel drive form factor used by the Chrysler minivans. This concept would eventually be put into production as the first-generation GMT199 (U) platform minivans, although some design elements from the concept were not utilized on the production models.

In contrast to the Astro/Safari, which used a variety of components from Chevrolet/GMC light trucks, the front-wheel drive GMT199 platform (also known as the U platform) was dedicated to the Chevrolet, Pontiac, and Oldsmobile minivans, sharing primarily engines and transmissions with other GM vehicles. In place of the official GMT199 platform designation, GM began to use the APV name, standing for All Purpose Vehicle. Chevrolet would receive the Lumina APV, Oldsmobile would receive the Silhouette, and Pontiac adopted the Trans Sport name from the 1986 concept van.

During its development, the APV model lines largely benchmarked the extended-length Chrysler vans, closely matching their length, width, and height (on a shorter wheelbase). To expand its market potential (and to mitigate any potential model overlap), GM sought to make distinct marketing objectives for each model lines. The Lumina APV was to compete directly with the higher-volume Voyager/Caravan, serving as a "volume leader", the Trans Sport was to be the sporty minivan equivalent of sporty Pontiac sedans, and the luxury-trim Silhouette was intended as a more contemporary competitor to the Chrysler Town & Country and Ford Aerostar Eddie Bauer.

== Model overview ==
At the time of its 1990 release, the Lumina APV was marketed as a bodystyle of the Chevrolet Lumina model line. For the 1989 model year, Chevrolet introduced the Lumina, effectively consolidating the Celebrity and Monte Carlo into a single model line, with the Lumina APV replacing the Celebrity station wagon.

At its 1990 introduction, the Lumina APV was offered in two trim levels; a base trim and an up-level CL trim. There was also the Chevrolet APV cargo van, a two-seater commercial vehicle. Base-trim versions featured red exterior trim while CL versions were produced with chrome exterior trim. For 1993, the CL trim was renamed LS; the Lumina APV badging was removed from the doors. For 1994, the model underwent a mid-cycle revision and was renamed the Chevrolet Lumina Minivan (in place of the APV suffix). The final vans rolled off the assembly line on June 27, 1996.

=== Chassis specification ===
The Chevrolet Lumina APV is a GM U-body vehicle, using the GMT199 platform designation. In contrast to the unibody design used by the Astro/Safari and the Van/Vandura, the Lumina APV chassis uses a chassis design similar to the Pontiac Fiero and Saturn SL, with a galvanized steel spaceframe supporting exterior body panels. The Lumina APV has a 109.8 inch wheelbase, sized between the Lumina sedan/coupe and the Astro/Safari.

In line with the Chrysler minivans, the Lumina APV was fitted with independent front suspension with MacPherson struts. The rear beam axle was fitted with coil springs (the only other minivan besides the Ford Aerostar and Renault Espace at the time). As an option, Chevrolet offered the Lumina APV with load-leveling rear air springs, utilizing the air compressor that inflated the rear air springs for auxiliary use with an air hose kit. The front brakes were vented discs, with drum brakes at the rear; anti-lock braking (ABS) was introduced for 1992. During 1994, traction control was introduced as an option (with the 3.8L V6).

==== Powertrain ====
Upon its 1990 release, the Lumina APV was powered by a 3.1L V6, producing 120 hp (89 kW); a 3-speed automatic was the sole transmission offering. For 1992, a 170 hp (127 kW) 3.8-liter V6 became an option, introduced with a 4-speed automatic. For 1996, both engines were replaced by a 180 hp (134 kW) 3.4-liter V6; the 3-speed automatic was discontinued.

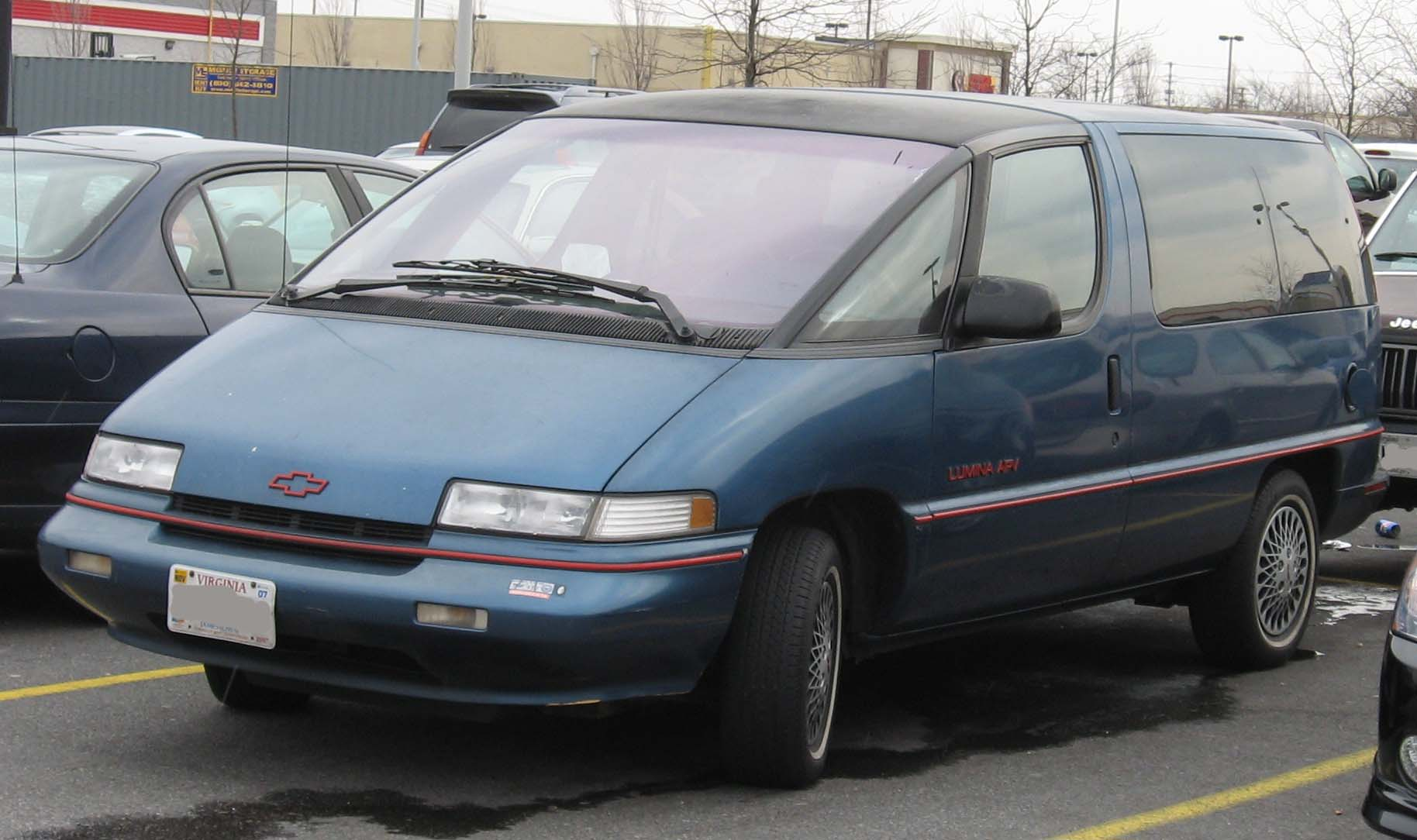
1990–1992 Lumina APV

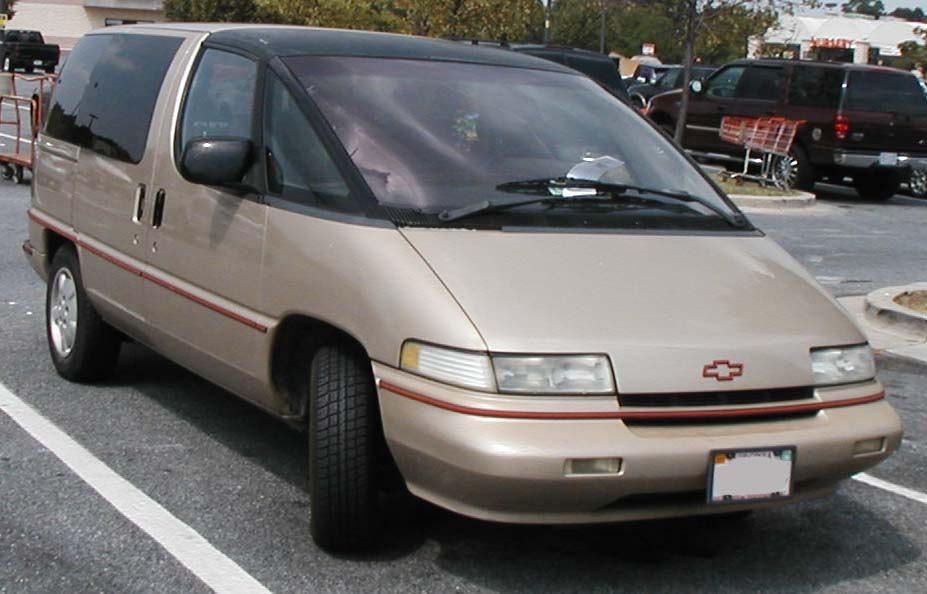
1993 Lumina APV

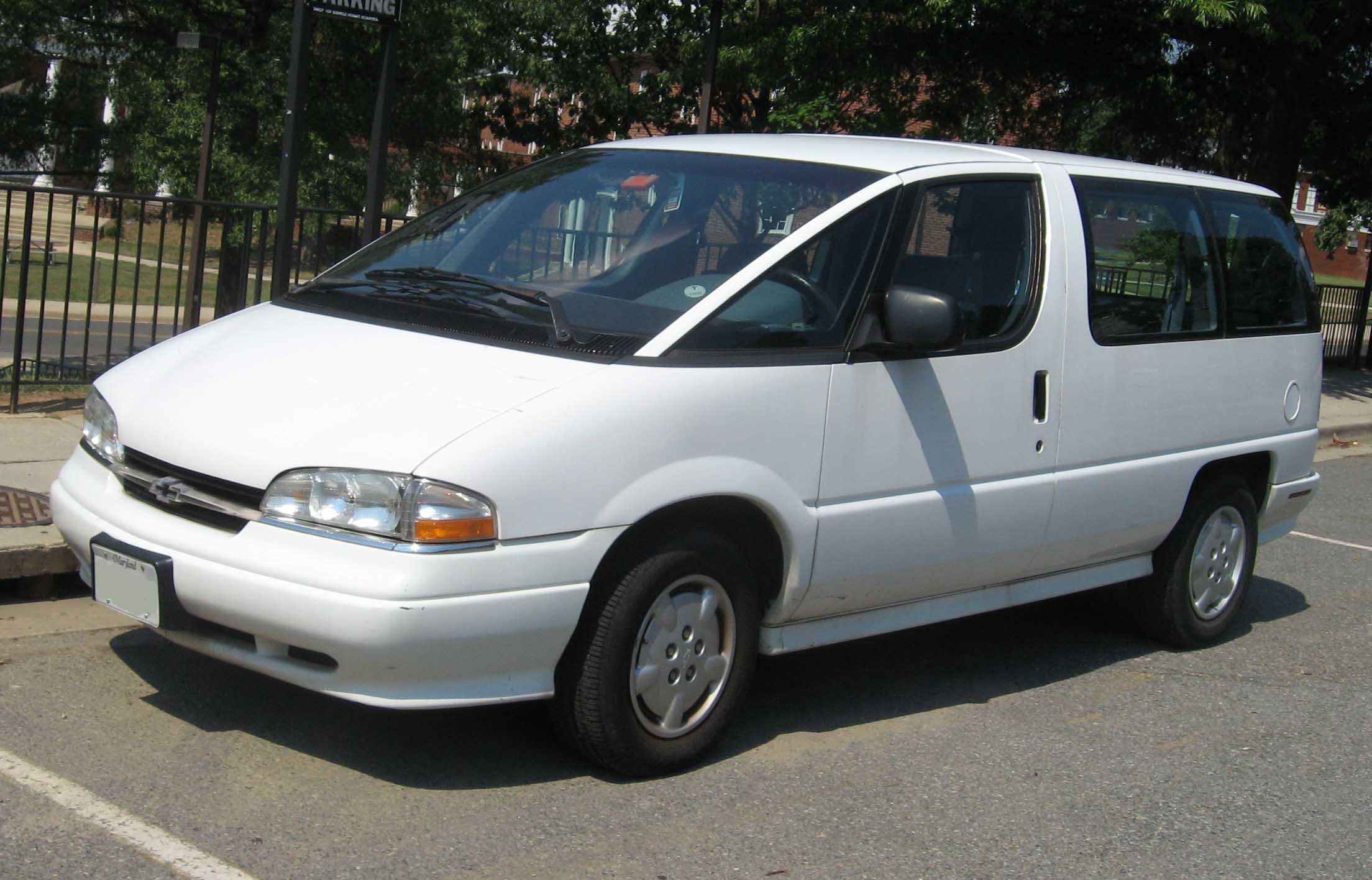
Lumina Minivan (post-facelift)

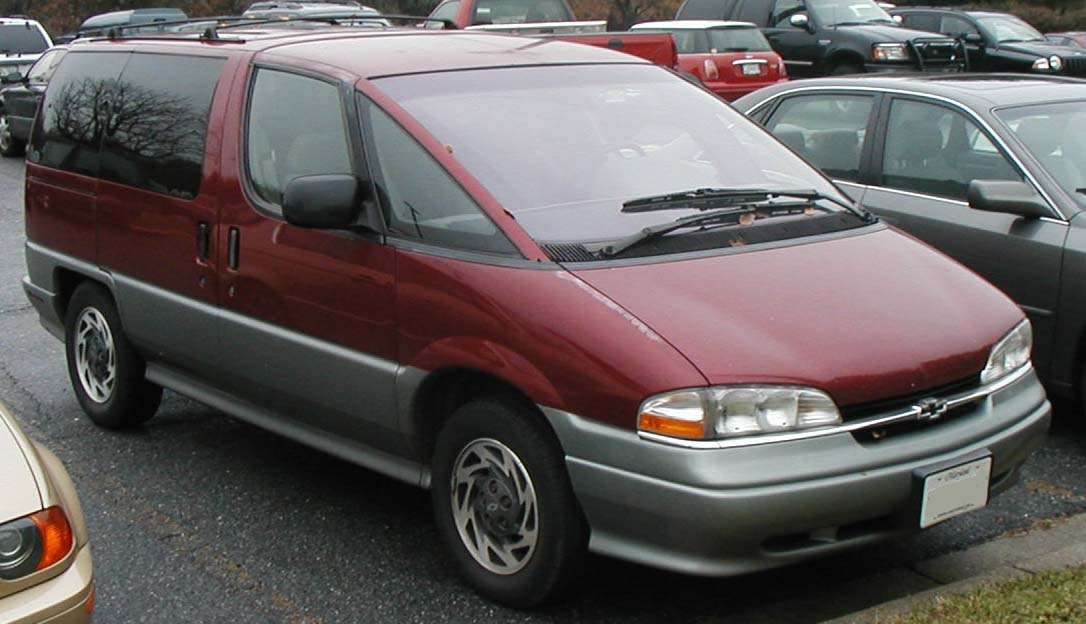
Lumina Minivan LS

=== Body design ===
==== Exterior ====
Distinguished by its large windshield and sloped hoodline, the Lumina APV was of a "one-box" design, a configuration similar to the Ford Aerostar and Renault Espace. In line with the Aerostar and Chrysler minivans, the Lumina APV was configured with a single sliding door and a rear liftgate. Closely matching the 1987-1990 Chrysler "Grand" minivans in length, width, and height, the Lumina APV is nearly 10 inches (250 mm) lower than the Astro and 3 inches (80 mm) narrower.

Coinciding with the use of a galvanized steel spaceframe (in place of a conventional unit-body design), the Lumina APV was fitted with composite plastic (SMC) body panels. Developed for the Pontiac Fiero and later expanded in use for the Saturn SL, the manufacturing technique largely eliminated the threat of corrosion and damage from minor dents and dings. The manufacturing also allowed GM to style the Lumina APV separately from its Pontiac and Oldsmobile counterparts at low cost; each model line is externally distinguished by its hood and front fascia.

Along from its front fascia, the Lumina APV is distinguished from its Pontiac and Oldsmobile counterparts in the styling of its roof. From the B-pillar to the windshield, the roof was painted black; on examples with tinted glass, this design was to mimic the style of the glass roof from the 1986 Trans Sport concept. The Trans Sport had its entire roof painted black (with the exception of a band joining the B-pillars) again mirroring the glass roof of the 1986 concept, whereas the Silhouette had body-color A-pillars and black B-pillars. Two-tone versions of the Lumina APV were available; an early configuration featured a blacked-out upper body. For 1992, Chevrolet standardized the folding sideview mirrors of the CL trim.

For the 1994 model year, the Lumina APV underwent an exterior revision, shortening the front overhang by nearly three inches. Largely intended to visually shorten the angle of the hoodline, the Lumina Minivan (dropping the APV suffix) was given a new hood, larger grille, and much larger headlights (shared with the Pontiac Bonneville SSEi). 15-inch wheels became standard, with the LS offering a (restyled) version of the 16-inch wheels of the Beretta Z26. The roof was restyled slightly, adopting painted A-pillars and a full-length body-color roof. Additionally, a center high-mount stop lamp (CHMSL) was added to the liftgate. As the APV's taillamps were mounted in the D-pillars, the CHMSL ended up being the lowest-situated of the three brake lamps. For this model year, the Lumina APV (and its counterparts) introduced a power-operated sliding door via remote control, the first American-market minivan to offer this design. They were originally planned to debut in the 1993 model year but failed to do so because of numerous quality control problems, which delayed the production of this feature until the 1994 model year.

==== Interior ====
Distinguished from its counterparts by trim, the interior design of the Lumina APV was centered around its modular rear seating system. Four configurations were offered: a two-seat cargo van, a five-seat passenger layout (2+3), six seats (2+2+2), and seven seats (2+3+2). In contrast to removable rear bench seats (a design derived from full-size vans), the 34-pound rear seats of the Lumina APV were individually removable and each seatback folded flat. To supplement the cupholders of the interior, each seatback was fitted with two built-in cupholders. As part of the 1994 revision, 7-passenger versions were offered with the option of integrated child seats. For 1996, the five and six-passenger configurations were deleted.

While sharing most of its dashboard design with the Trans Sport/Silhouette, the Lumina APV featured its own instrument panel design (derived from the Corsica). As a consequence of its sloped windshield design, the depth of the dashboard of the Lumina APV (and its counterparts) was among the highest ever seen in a mass-produced automobile. For 1991, the dashboard padding was revised to address complaints about glare. For 1992, the external radio antenna was replaced by an integrated design mounted between the headliner and the roof. The 1994 revision brought an update to the instrument panel, lower dashboard (and center console controls), and introduced a driver-side airbag (replacing the steering wheel of the Lumina Z34 with one from the Camaro).

== Variants ==
=== Cargo van ===
From mid-1990 to 1996, Chevrolet produced the Lumina APV as a cargo van, known simply as APV (no Lumina badging was used on the exterior). Slotted below the Astro/Safari, the cargo van competed against the Grand Caravan C/V. While sharing an identical body with its passenger-van counterpart, Chevrolet deleted the rear interior of the cargo van to include a flat rubber-mat floor; the rear glass windows were replaced by body-color plastic panels bonded in place. The cargo space held 133 cubic feet (3.8 m^{3}) and the max cargo capacity was 1,135 pounds (515 kg).

Of the three GMT199/APV vans, only Chevrolet offered a cargo van configuration.

=== Chinese clone ===
Chevrolet marketed the Lumina APV in China from 1993 to 1996, selling a number of examples in the country. In 1996, Jiangsu Nushen Automobile (Nushen) debuted the Nushen JB6500. While nearly identical in dimensions and exterior design, the JB6500 is a rear-wheel drive vehicle, powered by an 87 hp (64 kW) Chrysler-designed 2.2-liter inline-four, paired to a 5-speed manual transmission. In 2001, Nushen ended production of the JB6500.

== See also ==
- Oldsmobile Silhouette
- Pontiac Trans Sport
