= Buick Terraza =

Four-door minivan by Buick, 2005–2007

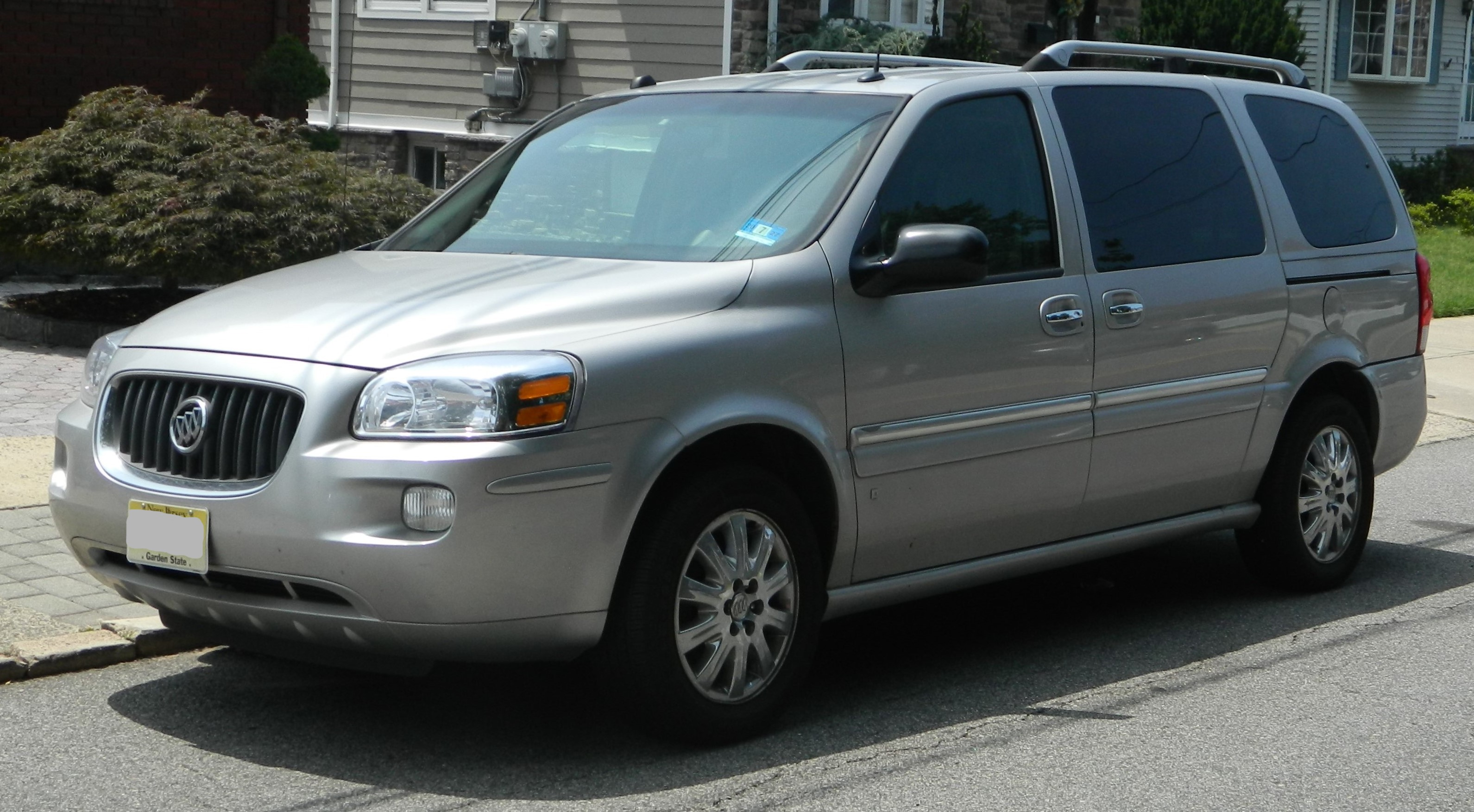

Overview
- Manufacturer: General Motors
- Production: June 2004 – June 2007
- Model years: 2005–2007
- Assembly: United States: Doraville, Georgia (Doraville Assembly)

Body and chassis
- Class: Minivan
- Body style: 4-door minivan
- Layout: Transverse front-engine, front-wheel drive / all-wheel drive
- Platform: GM U platform/GMT201
- Related: Buick GL8; Chevrolet Uplander; Pontiac Montana SV6; Saturn Relay

Powertrain
- Engine: 3.5 L LX9 V6; 3.9 L LZ9/LGD V6
- Transmission: 4-speed automatic

Dimensions
- Wheelbase: 121.1 in (3,076 mm)
- Length: 205.0 in (5,207 mm)
- Width: 72.0 in (1,829 mm)
- Height: 72.1 in (1,831 mm)
- Curb weight: 4,426 lb (2,008 kg)

The Buick Terraza is a four-door minivan marketed by Buick from the 2005 to 2007 model years as a luxury crossover sport van. As Buick's first minivan for the North American market, it was a badge-engineered variant of the Chevrolet, Pontiac, and Saturn minivans sharing the U platform, all manufactured in Doraville, Georgia.

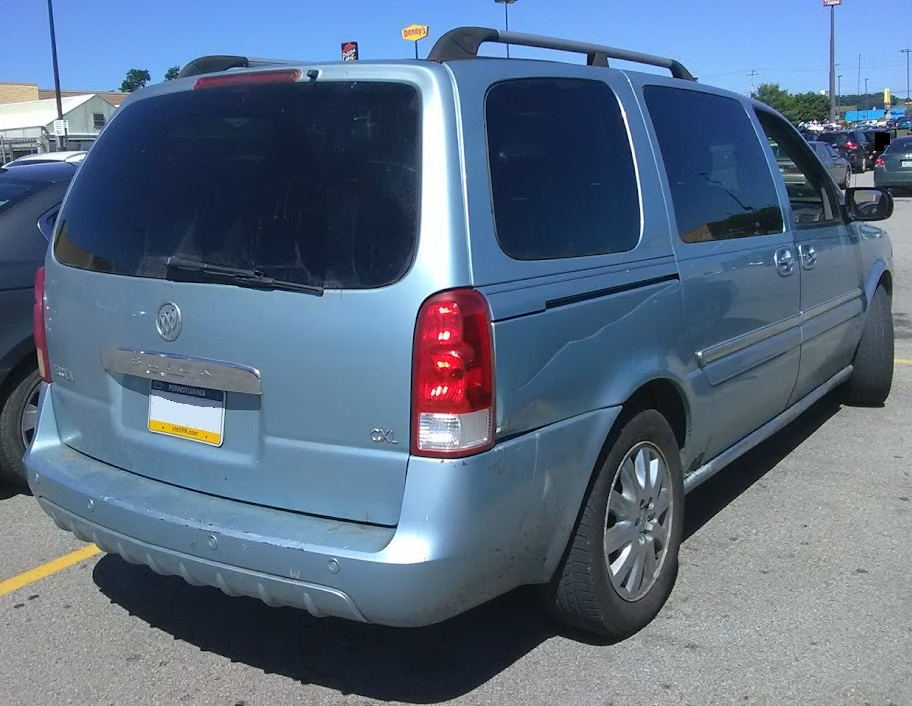
Buick Terraza rear

== Design ==
The Terraza retailed at US$28,110 in 2005 (equivalent to $46,339 in 2025), and debuted with one engine, a 3.5 L High Value V6 generating 200 hp (149 kW) and 220 lb·ft (298 N·m) of torque. For 2006, a 3.9 L LZ9 V6, with 240 hp (179 kW) and 240 lb·ft (332 Nm) torque became available; the 3.5 L engine was discontinued a year later. The Terraza offered leather seats and faux wood trim on the steering wheel, instrument panel, and gear shift knob.

Borrowing a design feature from the Rendezvous, all 2005–2006 Terraza models featured an independent short-and-long-arm rear suspension with aluminum crossmember and control arms, regardless of drivetrain. The independent rear suspension was replaced with a beam axle for 2007.

The 2007 Terraza equipped with side airbags scored a "good" in the frontal offset and an "acceptable" in the side impact Insurance Institute for Highway Safety (IIHS) crash tests.

== Year-by-year changes ==
- 2005: Buick introduces the Terraza, its first minivan for the North American market. The Terraza was available in two trim lines: entry-level CX and top-of-the-line CXL; both trims were available in front-wheel drive or all-wheel drive.
- 2006: The 3.5 L V6 could also be upgraded to a 3.9 L (in FWD only) LZ9 V6 engine. Second-row seat-mounted side airbags became an option, and the wheels featured six lug nuts instead of five.
- 2007: The Terraza's last year, and all-wheel-drive models were dropped. The 3.9 L V6 was the only engine offered; however, it was available with a flex-fuel option. More standard features were offered on the new CX Plus model, which slotted between the CX and CXL. The independent rear suspension was replaced with a beam axle. The last Terraza was assembled in June 2007, and the Terraza was removed from Buick's website in early fall 2007.

== Sales ==
| Calendar year | U.S. sales |
|---|---|
| 2004 | 2,137 |
| 2005 | 20,288 |
| 2006 | 11,948 |
| 2007 | 5,569 |
| 2008 | 544 |
| Total | 45,385 |

== See also ==
- Buick GL8 – A Chinese-exclusive minivan, whose first generation served as the basis for the Terraza.
