= Pontiac Trans Sport =

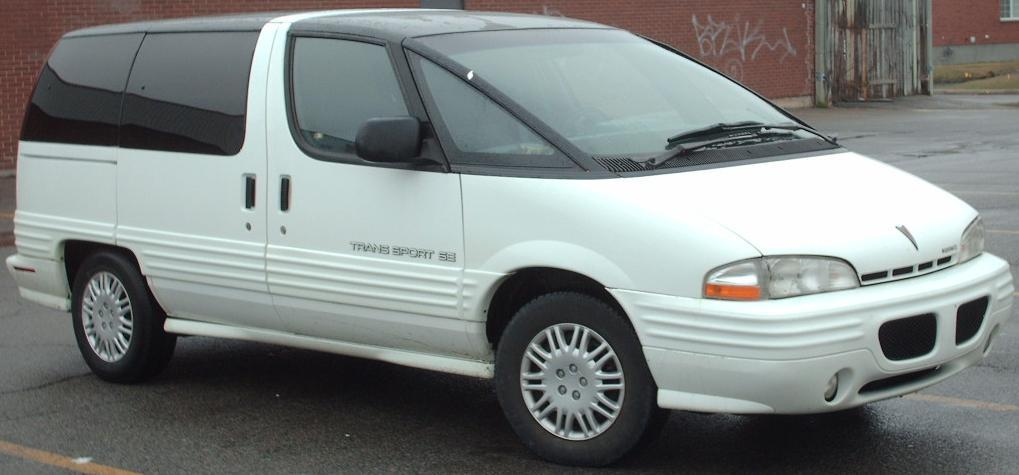
- First-generation Pontiac Trans Sport SE (post-facelift)

Overview
- Manufacturer: Pontiac (General Motors)
- Production: 1989–1998
- Model years: 1990–1999

Body and chassis
- Class: Minivan
- Layout: Transverse front-engine, front-wheel drive
- Platform: U-body
- Related: Chevrolet Lumina APV; Oldsmobile Silhouette

Chronology
- Predecessor: Pontiac Safari
- Successor: Pontiac Montana

The Pontiac Trans Sport is a minivan that was marketed by Pontiac from the 1990 to 1999 model years. The first minivan marketed by the division, the Trans Sport marked the beginning of a wider transition of moving away from sedans and station wagons as family-oriented vehicles. Marketed between the Chevrolet Lumina APV (the first front-wheel drive Chevrolet minivan) and the Oldsmobile Silhouette (like the Trans Sport, the first minivan by the brand) took its name from a similar 1986 concept vehicle.

The first-generation Trans Sport took on a "Dustbuster" nickname for its controversial front body styling (with a long front overhang); the second-generation version, much like several other model lines, marked an industry shift towards adopting a form factor similar to that used by the Chrysler minivans. Officially designated a U-platform vehicle, both generations of the Trans Sport share mechanical commonality and shared componentry with the W platform Pontiac Grand Prix.

The Trans Sport was initially assembled at North Tarrytown Assembly (Tarrytown/Sleepy Hollow, New York), shifting production to Doraville Assembly (Doraville, Georgia) for its second generation. For the 1998 model year, Pontiac renamed the Trans Sport the Pontiac Montana, after an exterior trim package introduced in 1997.

== Background ==
Following the 1984 model-year release of the Chrysler minivans, General Motors responded with the release of the Chevrolet Astro and GMC Safari for the 1985 model year. Though initially comparable to the Dodge Caravan and Plymouth Voyager in length and wheelbase, the Astro/Safari were heavier-duty vehicles, sharing components with compact pickup trucks and full-size cars. Though the GM minivans were widely accepted in the marketplace (alongside the competitive Ford Aerostar, both passenger and cargo van variants were marketed), the Astro/Safari did not secure as wide of market share as the initial Chrysler model lines.

To compete more closely against the Caravan/Voyager, General Motors began development of a front-wheel drive minivan for the 1990s. Prior to the 1986 debut of the concept car (see below), General Motors approved the design of what would become the APV minivans, with the Trans Sport (loosely deriving its name from the Trans Am Firebird) targeting sport- and style-oriented buyers, while the Chevrolet Lumina APV serving as the value-based offering, and the Oldsmobile Silhouette targeting premium markets.

=== 1986 concept car ===
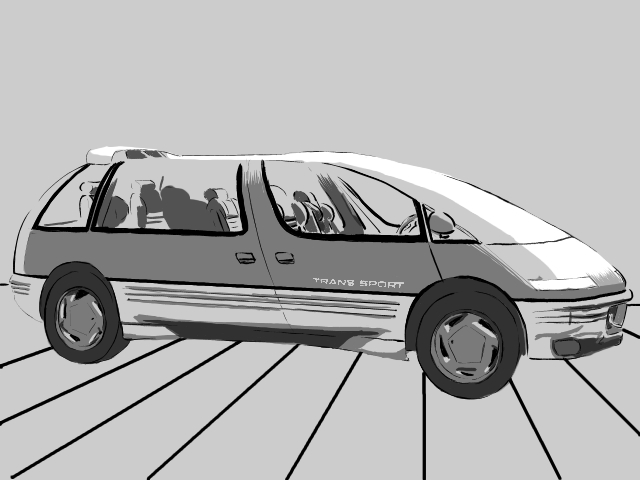
1986 Trans Sport concept

At the 1986 Chicago Auto show, General Motors released the Pontiac Trans Sport concept vehicle. Derived from the chassis of the mid-size Pontiac 6000, the Trans Sport concept was nearly 6 inches lower than the Plymouth Voyager of the time. To give the vehicle a far more contemporary exterior, the Trans Sport was styled with blacked-out A-pillars and upswept B-pillars (giving the front row the look of a wraparound windshield). In place of a traditional curbside sliding door, the concept car was designed with a right-side gull-wing door (the driver-side window line was fitted with wraparound glass from the B-pillar to the liftgate). Much of the roof was glass; at its widest point, the headliner was only 36 inches wide. Though highly unlikely for production, the Trans Sport was designed with multifunction taillamps; in addition to traditional red brake lamps and white/clear reverse lamps, the units added amber for deceleration.

The interior of the Trans Sport previewed the 1990s integration of technology into GM vehicles (including multiple Pontiacs), featuring a windshield heads-up display, a multifunction steering wheel, and a primitive form of what later would become OnStar; along with a digital rearview mirror and electronic transmission shifter, and a Nintendo Entertainment System was integrated for the rear passenger compartment.

Though deriving its chassis from the 6000 sedan/wagon, the Trans Sport concept car was fitted with a 235hp turbocharged 2.9L V6 (intended for a stillborn version of the Pontiac Fiero), paired with a 3-speed automatic. 17-inch wheels (the same diameter as the later Corvette ZR-1) were used, much larger than any other non-Firebird Pontiac vehicle of the time.

== First generation (1990-1996) ==
First generation (GMT199)
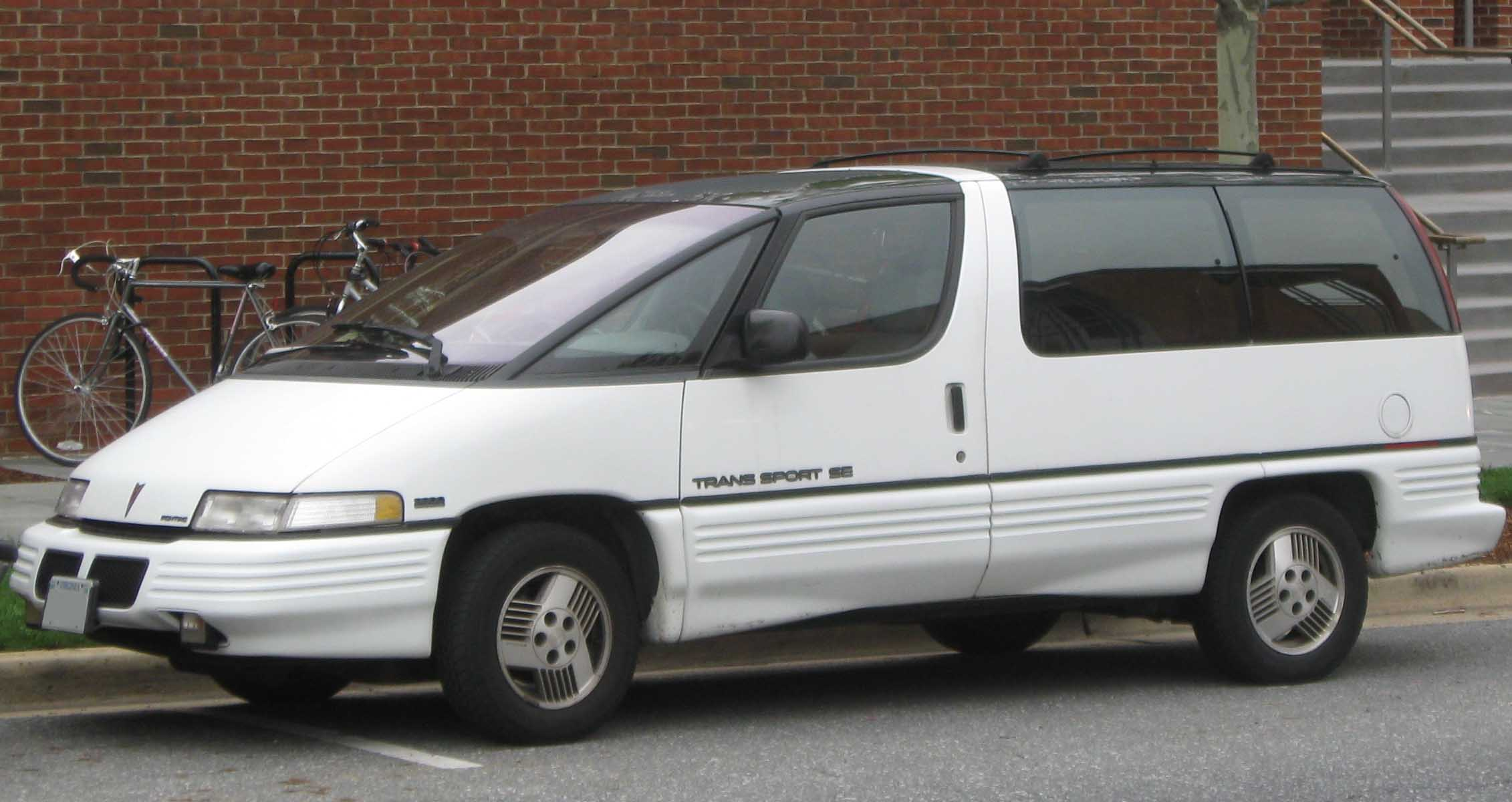

Overview
- Production: 1989– June 27, 1996
- Assembly: United States: North Tarrytown, New York (North Tarrytown Assembly)

Body and chassis
- Body style: 3-door van
- Layout: Transverse front-engine, front-wheel drive
- Platform: U-body/GMT199
- Related: Chevrolet Lumina APV; Oldsmobile Silhouette

Powertrain
- Engine: 2.3 L LD2 I4; 3.1 L LG6 V6; 3.4 L LA1 V6; 3.8 L L27 V6
- Transmission: 5-speed manual; 3-speed 3T40 automatic; 4-speed 4T60-E automatic

Dimensions
- Wheelbase: 109.8 in (2,789 mm)
- Length: 1993–96: 194.5 in (4,940 mm); 1990–92: 194.7 in (4,945 mm)
- Width: 74.6 in (1,895 mm)
- Height: 1993–96: 65.7 in (1,669 mm); 1990–92: 65.2 in (1,650 mm)
- Curb weight: 3,600–3,900 lb (1,630–1,770 kg)

Introduced for the 1990 model year, the Pontiac Trans Sport was introduced as the first Pontiac minivan; alongside the newly introduced Grand Prix four-door, the Trans Sport was phased in to replace the mid-size 6000.

Similar to the Ford Aerostar and Toyota Previa, the Trans Sport used a "single-box" body design, with the hood blending into the slope of the windshield. The long front overhang (resulting from the front-wheel drive chassis) of the body was poorly received, leading to the minivan being referred to as the "Dustbuster" (after the handheld vacuum cleaner). This status was carried over to two other minivans manufactured by different brands.

The last Trans Sport of this generation rolled off the assembly line on June 27, 1996, coinciding with the closure of the North Tarrytown Assembly plant shortly afterwards.

=== Chassis ===
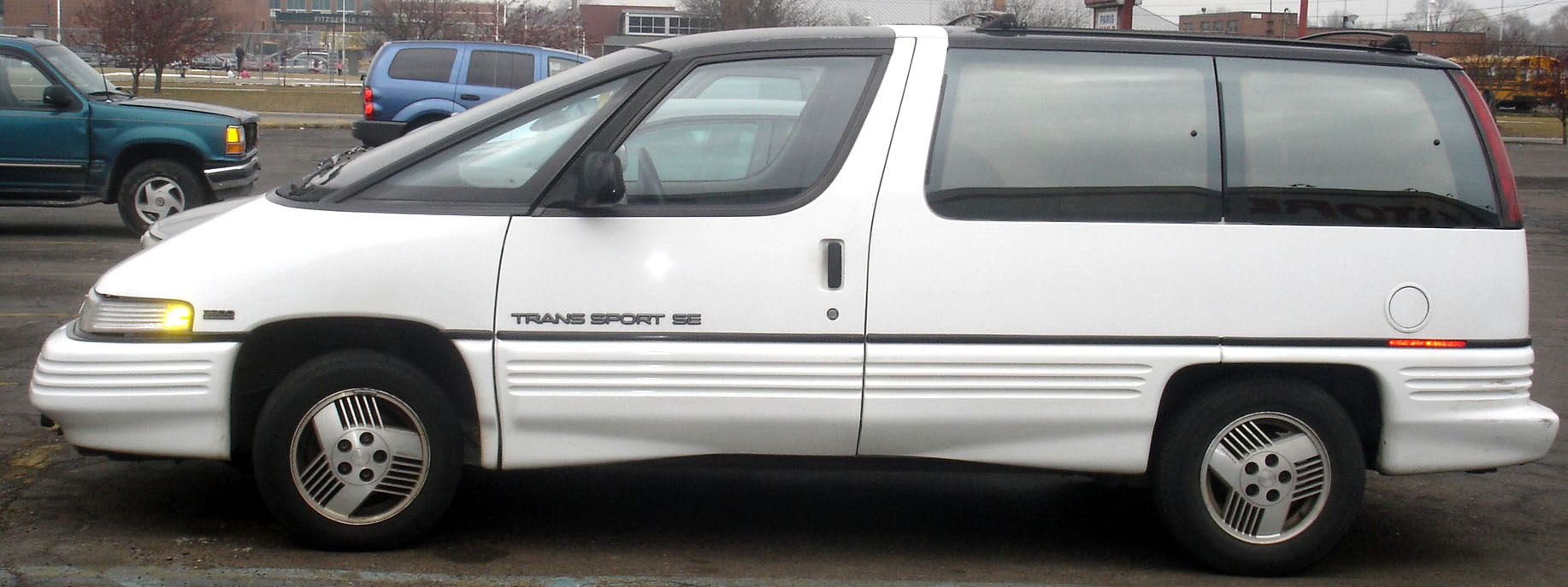
Sideview of GMT199 minivan, showing "Dustbuster" profile.

The first-generation Trans Sport is a GM U platform vehicle, with GM moving to a specific GMT199 platform code. In contrast to the 1986 concept vehicle (which used a lengthened A-body chassis), the GMT199 architecture employed a galvanized steel space frame, similar in concept to the Pontiac Fiero and the Saturn SL/SW/SC.

Anti-lock brakes (ABS) was added as a standard feature in 1992. For 1994, traction control was added as an option on 3.8 L vehicles.

==== Powertrain details ====
In contrast to the 235 hp (175 kW) turbocharged 2.9 L V6 engine of the 1986 Trans Sport concept, the production Trans Sport was fitted with a naturally-aspirated 3.1 L V6 producing 120 hp (89 kW), shared with the 6000 and Grand Prix; a three-speed automatic was the sole transmission offered. For 1992, a 170 hp (127 kW) 3.8 L 3800 V6 with a 4-speed Hydra-Matic 4T60 transmission (adding an overdrive gear) was introduced. For 1996, Both the 3.1 L and 3.8 L V6 engines were replaced by a 180 hp (134 kW) 3.4 L V6; the 3-speed transmission was retired.

=== Body ===
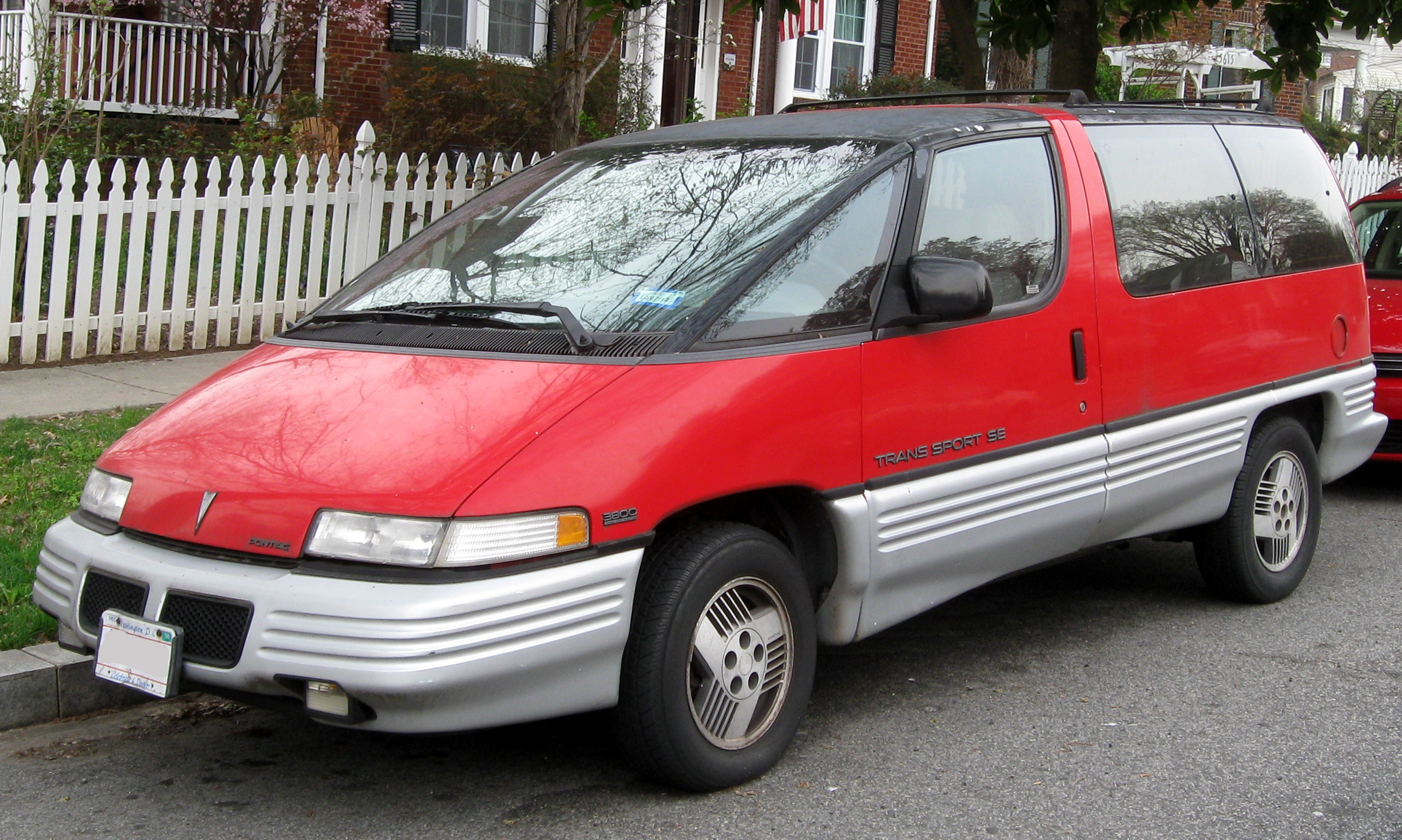
1992 Pontiac Trans Sport SE

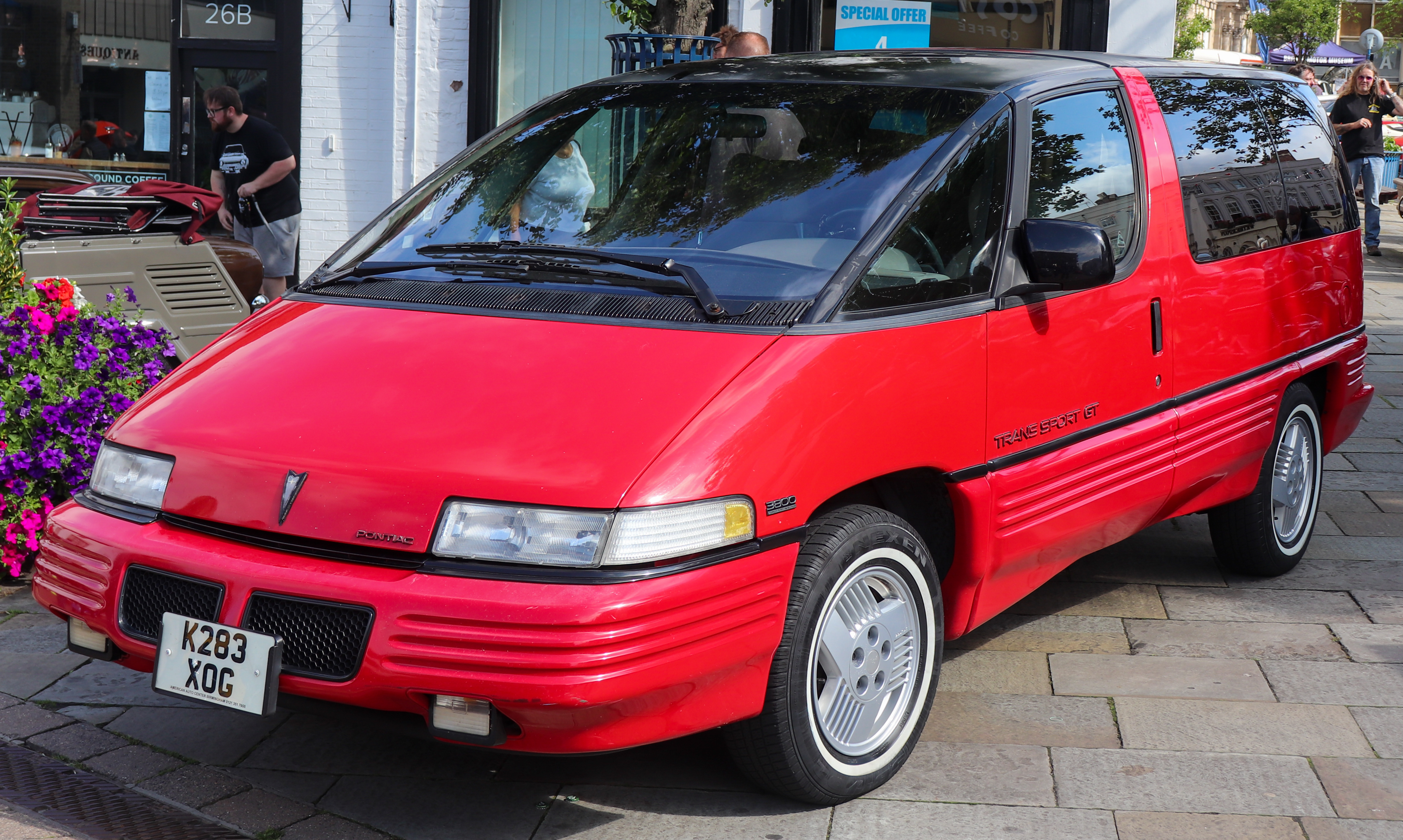
1992 Pontiac Trans Sport GT

Though sharing nearly all exterior body panels, each GMT199 minivan was distinguished by its roofline styling. The Chevrolet Lumina APV debuted with a black roof forward of the B-pillar and a body-color rear roof; the Oldsmobile Silhouette, a blacked-out B-pillar with a body-color A-pillar and roofline. The Trans Sport was fitted with a largely black roof, with a body-color B-pillar; the extensive lower body cladding was a feature adopted from the 1986 concept car (and as part of Pontiac model tradition).

In following with its spaceframe construction, only the roof panel of the Trans Sport is made of steel, with all exterior vertical side body panels made from polymer plastic (similar to Saturns). In line with the concept car, the production Trans Sport has a large amount of slotted body cladding (to protect the body from dents). Though toned down extensively from its 1986 namesake concept, the production vehicle retained an upswept B-pillars, widely curved glass (used on all windows) with blacked-out window pillars. Along with the adoption of a full-width metal roof and the use of a sliding door, the largest styling change from the concept car saw a different set of taillamps, moving to a vertically-oriented design integrated in the D-pillars. For 1991, a sunroof became a new option; a year later, the external radio antenna was deleted (replaced by a design integrated between the roof and headliner). For 1992, the sideview mirrors were redesigned; along with growing in size, the units now were able to fold inward.

Though the production Trans Sport interior did not adopt many of the high-technology features of the 1986 concept car, the model line debuted a modular set of rear seats. In place of the typical two full-length rear bench seats, the rear interior of Trans Sport could be configured in multiple ways to accommodate passengers and cargo, as the rear was fitted with five individual rear bucket seats. Three configurations were offered: five seats (2-3), six seats (2-2-2), and seven seats (2-3-2).

For 1991, the dashboard was revised slightly, as non-reflective carpeted cloth was placed on the portion below the windshield (to reduce glare). In 1992, the Trans Sport adopted an interior feature from its namesake concept car, with steering-wheel radio controls becoming an option.

==== 1994 revision ====
For 1994, all three GMT199 minivans underwent a mid-cycle revision, largely in response towards the negative critical response towards their exterior design. To further visually shorten the exterior from the three inches removed from the body length, designers installed a new hood (sharing headlights with the Pontiac Bonneville), restyled lower body cladding, and a new front bumper (with a larger, vertical front grille). The rear side glass received a darker tint (visually lengthening the vehicle from the side). As a market first, the Trans Sport (alongside its APV minivan counterparts) introduced a power-operated sliding door; originally slated for 1993 but was postponed until 1994 in order to fix quality-control issues related to the design.

Coinciding with the addition of a driver-side airbag in the steering wheel (inherited from the Pontiac Grand Prix), the Trans Sport saw revisions to the dashboard; to make the forward edge of the windshield seem closer to the instrument panel, a ridged finishing panel was added. The rear seats were revised, with second-row seats receiving integrated child safety seats as an option. Air conditioning was made as standard equipment in 1996.

=== Trim ===
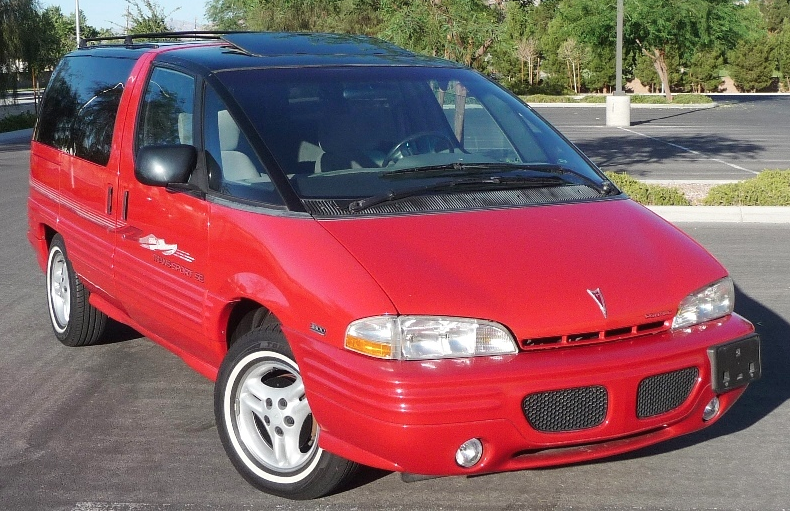
1995 Pontiac Trans Sport SE

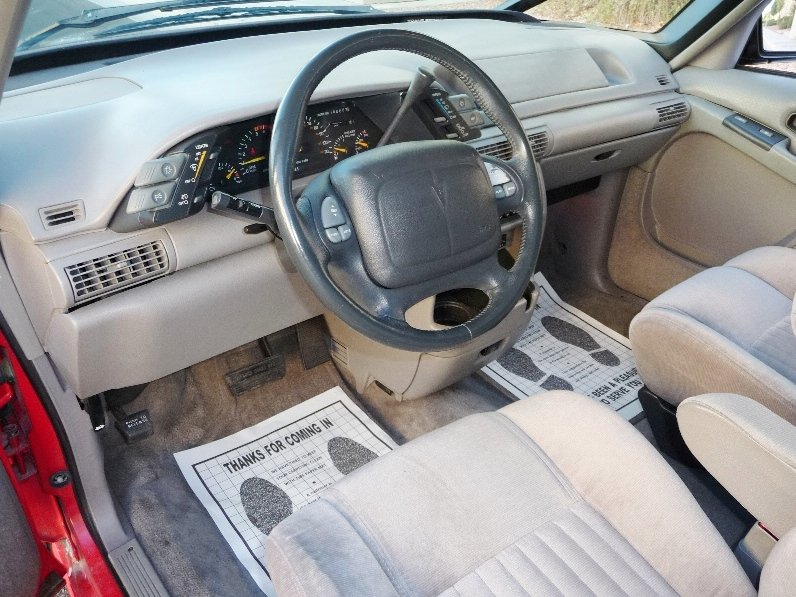
1995 Trans Sport dashboard

At its 1990 launch, the Pontiac Trans Sport was introduced in base Trans Sport trim (distinguished by silver lower body cladding) and the Trans Sport SE trim (body-color lower trim). For 1992, the trims were revised, as the base Trans Sport was discontinued and the sportier Trans Sport GT was introduced (with the 3.8L V6 standard); as part of the change, all Trans Sports became monochromatic. The GT also became the second APV minivan (besides the Oldsmobile Silhouette) available with leather seating (as an option).

In 1993, the Trans Sport GT was dropped after a single year, with all examples becoming Trans Sport SEs for the rest of the generation (with body-color badging); the SE was offered with any content from the GT as an option. As a stand-alone exterior option, a gold-color exterior trim package was offered; with certain colors, gold wheels, badging, and lower body cladding was paired with a body-color upper roof.

During 1995, the black-color roof that was standard (body-color was a no-cost option) was discontinued, bringing it closer in line with its GM counterparts and other minivans.

== Second generation (1997–1999) ==
Second generation (GMT200)
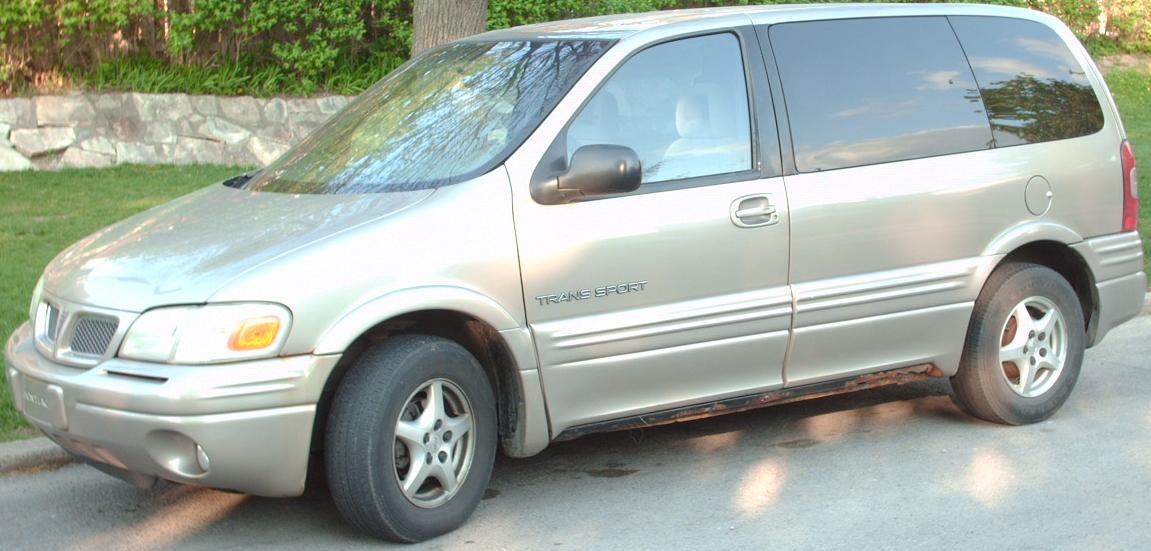

Overview
- Also called: Chevrolet Trans Sport (Europe, 1997–2004); Pontiac Montana (USA, 1999–2005; Canada, 2000–2005)
- Production: July 1996–1998 (United States and Mexico); September 1996–1999 (Canada)
- Model years: 1997–1998 (United States and Mexico); 1997–1999 (Canada)
- Assembly: United States: Doraville, Georgia (Doraville Assembly)

Body and chassis
- Body style: 3-door minivan 4-door minivan
- Platform: U-body/GMT200
- Related: Chevrolet Venture; Oldsmobile Silhouette; Opel/Vauxhall Sintra; Buick GL8

Powertrain
- Engine: 3.4 L (207 CID) LA1 3400 V6
- Transmission: 4-speed automatic

Dimensions
- Wheelbase: SWB: 112.0 in (2,845 mm); LWB: 120.0 in (3,048 mm)
- Length: SWB: 187.3 in (4,757 mm); LWB: 201.3 in (5,113 mm)
- Width: 72.7 in (1,847 mm)
- Height: SWB: 67.4 in (1,712 mm); LWB: 68.1 in (1,730 mm)

For the 1997 model year, Pontiac released the second-generation Trans Sport. In response to the controversial reception of the previous generation, GM redesigned its front-wheel drive minivans with a form factor closely matching the third-generation Chrysler minivans (released a year before), with the Trans Sport matched against the Dodge (Grand) Caravan. In contrast to the Ford Windstar, the second-generation Trans Sport was offered with two wheelbases, with single or dual sliding doors, and was offered through multiple brands.

Again serving as the mid-range GM minivan, the Trans Sport was slotted between the Chevrolet Venture (replacing the Lumina APV) and the Oldsmobile Silhouette. The model line introduced a Trans Sport Montana appearance package (see below); its popularity led Pontiac to rename its minivan line as the Pontiac Montana for 1999 (2000 in Canada).

Following the closure of the North Tarrytown Assembly plant in late June 1996, assembly of the model line was shifted to the Doraville Assembly plant in Georgia; the facility closed on September 26, 2008.

=== Chassis ===
Considered a U-body vehicle by its VIN designation, the second-generation Trans Sport used the official GMT200 platform designation. The innovative chassis construction from the previous generation was abandoned, largely benchmarking the NS-generation Caravan/Voyager, moving to a more conventional steel unibody with steel body panels. Growing significantly in size, the Trans Sport was now offered in a standard 112-inch wheelbase (2.2 inches longer) and a 120-inch extended-wheelbase chassis (between the Ford Aerostar and the Ford Windstar as the longest-wheelbase minivan).

The suspension used front MacPherson struts along with rear coil springs. As with the previous generation, the Trans Sport was fitted with front disc brakes and rear drum brakes.

==== Powertrain details ====
The second-generation Trans Sport carried over the 180 hp (134 kW) 3.4 L V6 engine from the previous-generation 1996 Trans Sport, with a 4-speed automatic transmission as standard equipment.

=== Body ===
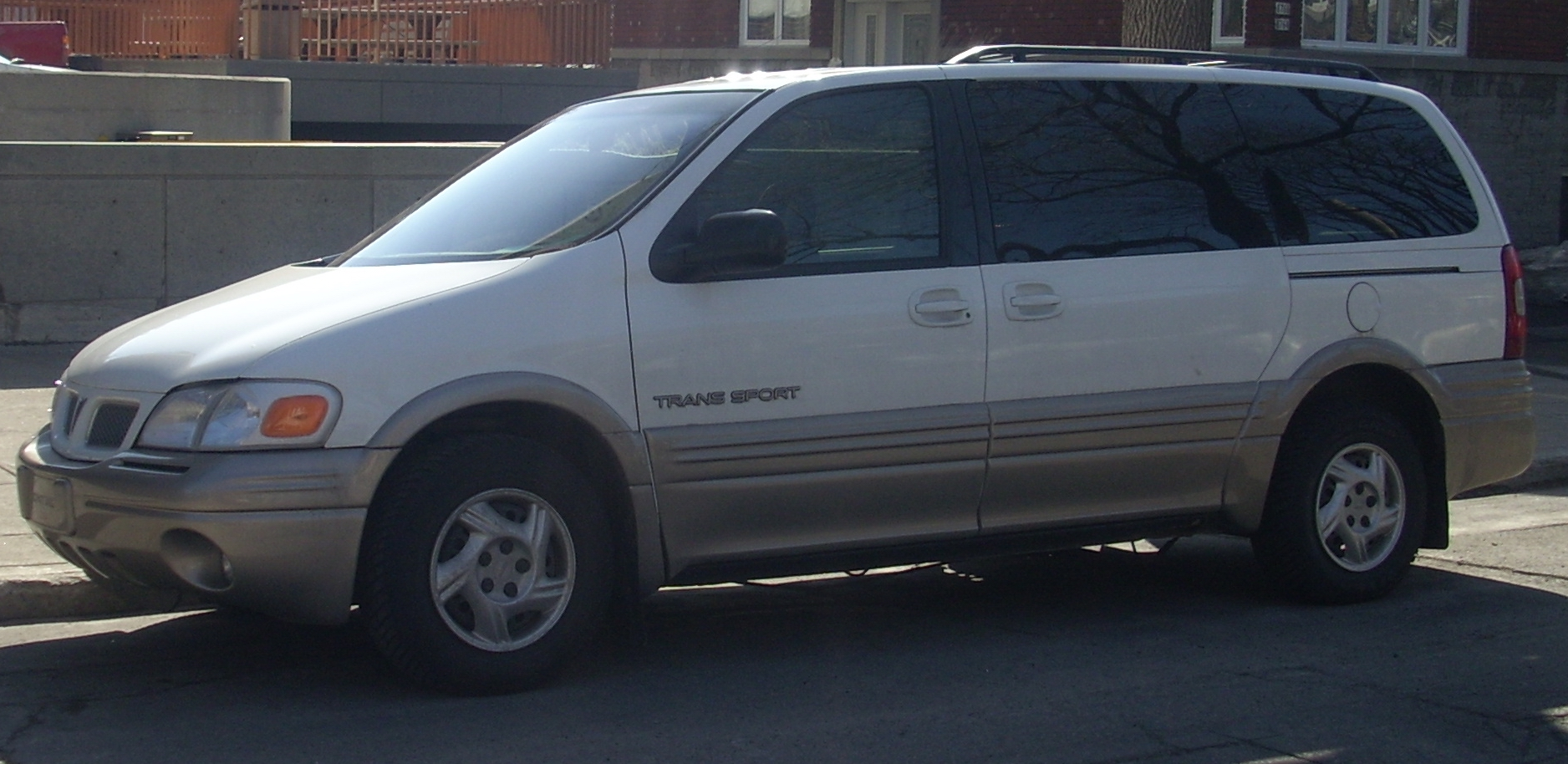
1997-1998 Pontiac Trans Sport LWB 4-door (two-tone body)

Moving away from the controversial "Dustbuster" profile of the previous generation, the second-generation Trans Sport was designed with a two-box form factor similar (if not more conservative) than the Dodge Caravan it competed most closely against.

As with the previous generation, the Trans Sport was distinguished from its divisional counterparts by Pontiac lower body cladding (dependent on trim, either in a contrasting or matching color). The traditional Pontiac split grille was enlarged and relocated between the headlamps (a change made for all GMT200 vehicles). The Trans Sport adopted a blacked-out B-pillar (shared with the Chevrolet Venture) for a blacked-out window line.

Reflecting the closer-coupled windshield angle (with a conventional A-pillar taking the place of fixed quarter glass), the interior featured a more conservative dashboard layout, with reduced surface area between the instrument panel and windshield edge. The Trans Sport shared its steering wheel and various switchgear from the Grand Prix (itself redesigned for 1997), with the minivan having its own instrument cluster.

Though the seats were completely redesigned, the modular seating feature of the previous generation made its return in two different configurations: eight passengers (2-3-3) and seven passengers (2-2-3, 2-3-2). In addition, the Trans Sport was available with rear bench seats (split or full-length) in a 2-2-3 configuration.

The GMT200 minivans adopted dual front airbags on the dashboard, with front-seat side airbags introduced in 1998 as a standard feature. As an option, the 1998 Trans Sport was the first minivan (alongside its divisional counterparts) to feature the OnStar telecommunications service (a modernized version of the system previewed in the 1986 concept car).

=== Trim ===
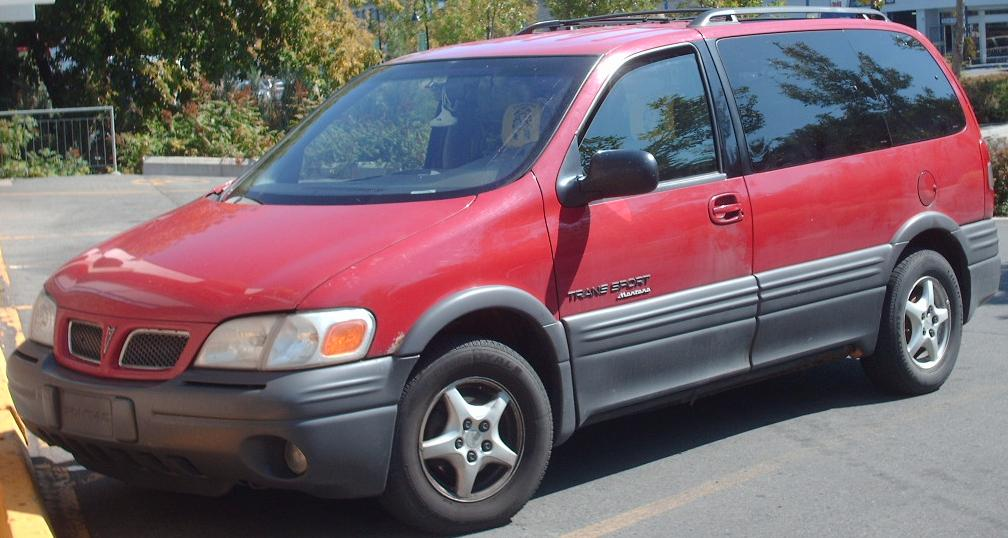
Pontiac Trans Sport Montana SWB 3-door

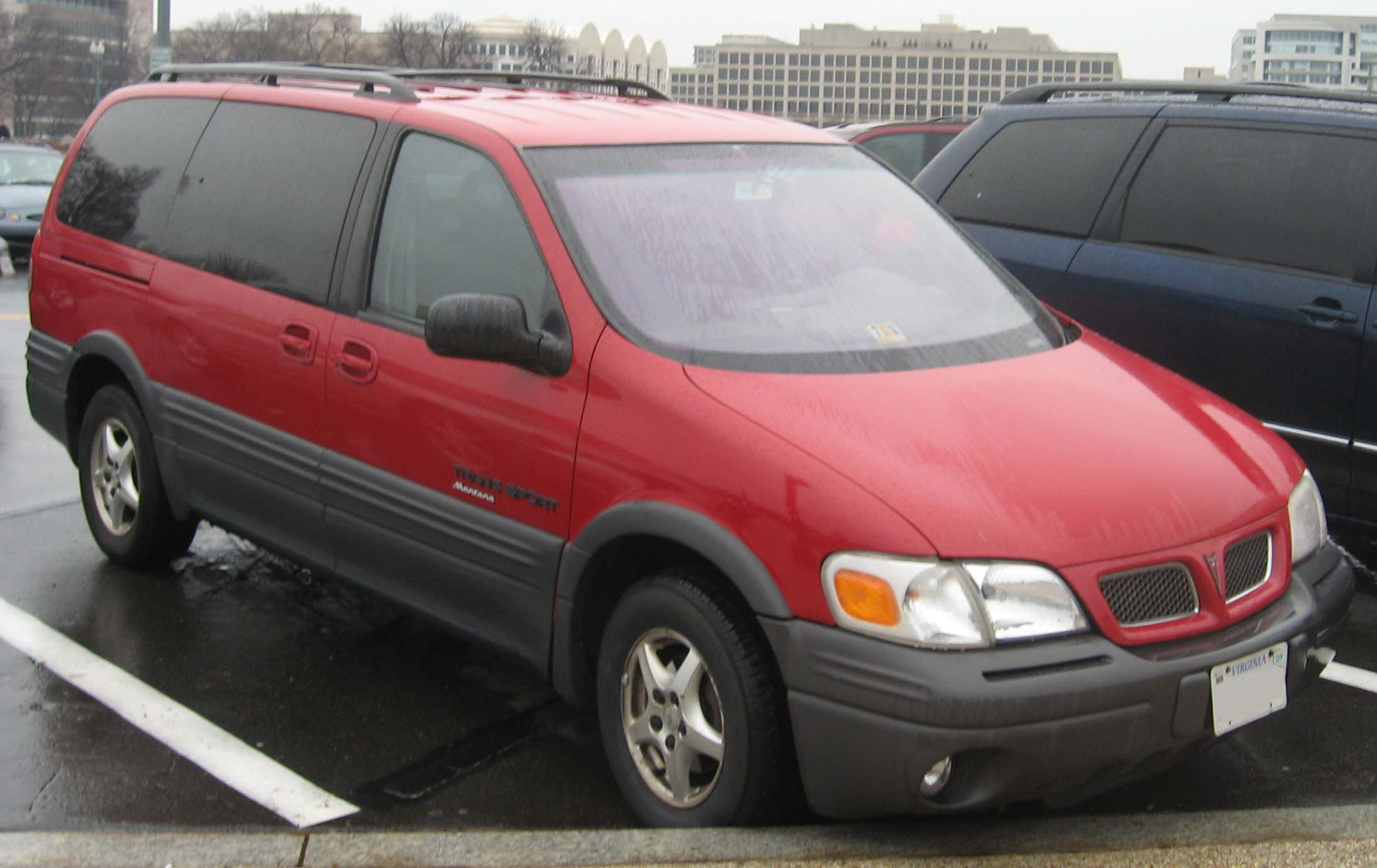
Pontiac Trans Sport Montana LWB 4-door

The Pontiac Trans Sport was initially offered in short wheelbase and long wheelbase versions and either one or two sliding doors; in 1998, two sliding doors became standard on all extended-wheelbase versions. The standard trim was simply named as the Pontiac Trans Sport, distinguished primarily by monochrome exteriors (or light-color body cladding). The Pontiac Trans Sport Montana was the flagship trim, styled for a more rugged look. In addition to using exclusive gray/tan body cladding and standard alloy wheels (with white-letter tires), the Montana was specified with "sport" suspension tuning, and load-leveling suspension (adding a rear-mounted air inflator).

The Montana trim level quickly became the most popular version of the Trans Sport line, accounting for over 80% of total Trans Sport sales. In 1998, Pontiac renamed its minivan as the Pontiac Montana in the United States (1999 in Canada).

=== Safety criticism ===
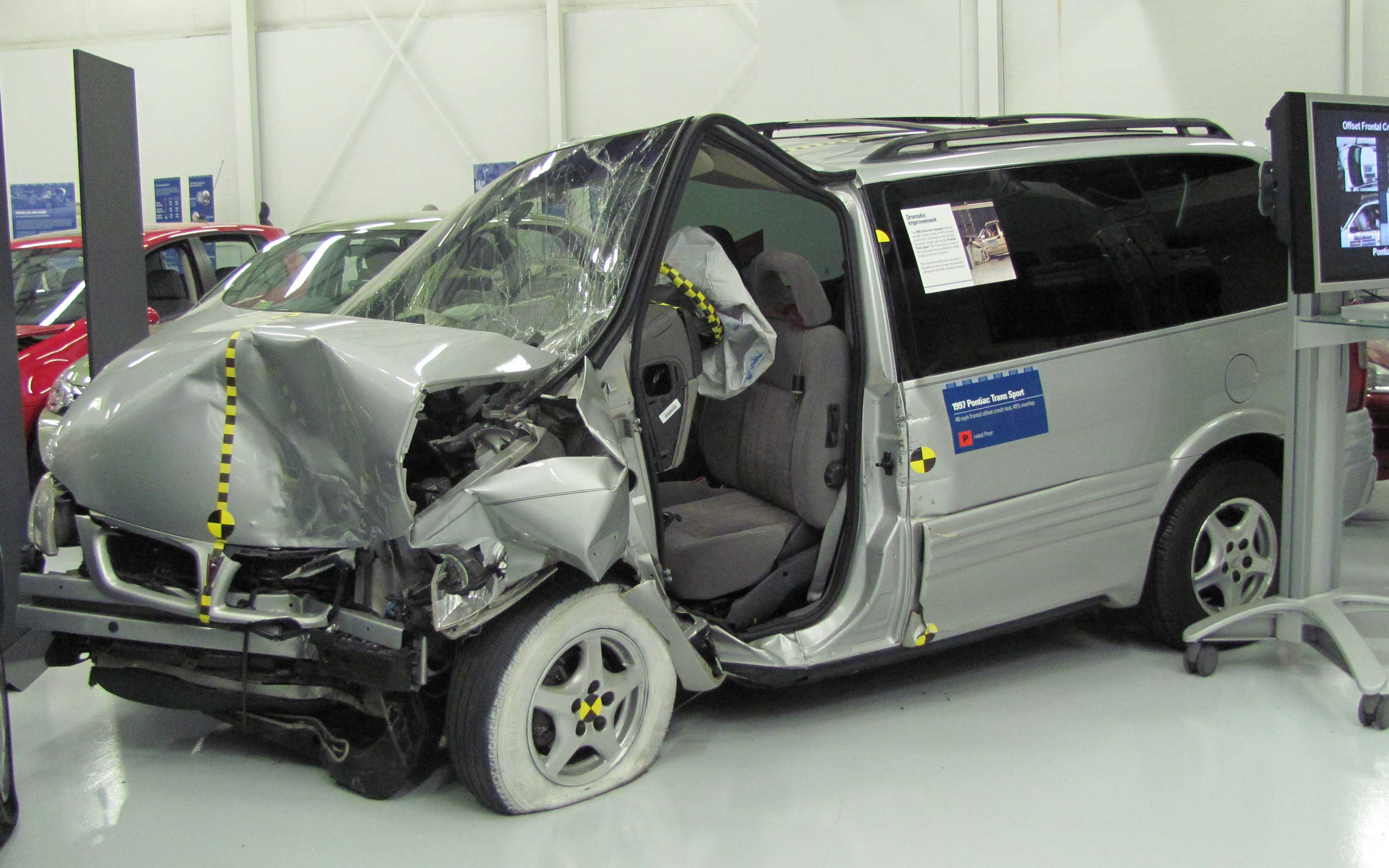
The 1997 Pontiac Trans Sport crash-tested by the Insurance Institute for Highway Safety (IIHS)

In 1996, the Insurance Institute for Highway Safety (IIHS) crash tested a 1997 Pontiac Trans Sport among other minivans of the time. The minivan suffered extreme damage to the vehicle in the 40 mph (64 km/h) moderate overlap crash test, which has resulted in some criticism by contemporary reviewers. The minivan received a "Poor" rating and was ranked as the "Worst Performing Vehicle" by the institute as a result. This status was also applied to the Chevrolet Venture and the Oldsmobile Silhouette as they both use the same chassis and body design, including the later first-generation Pontiac Montana.

Some comments made by the IIHS after the first test in 1996 were:

- Major collapse of the occupant compartment left little survival space for the driver.
- Extreme steering wheel movement snapped the dummy's head backward.
- The unnatural position of the dummy's left foot indicates that an occupant's left leg would have been seriously injured in a real-world crash of this severity.
- The forces on the left lower leg were so high that the dummy's metal foot broke off at the ankle.

In a semi-related event, the Trans Sport/Montana's European equivalent, the Opel/Vauxhall Sintra, also fared badly in Euro NCAP's frontal impact crash test on a 1998 model year minivan, made worse by the steering wheel (and airbag) breaking off from the dashboard (a phenomenon that was not present in the IIHS test). Despite performing well in the side impact test, it rated 2.5 stars as a result.

The safety issues of the Trans Sport/Montana and its U-body siblings were later addressed with the Montana SV6 (and the related Uplander), which earned the highest rating of "Good" given by the institute in the moderate overlap crash test.

The National Highway Traffic Safety Administration gave the van 4 stars for driver protection and 3 stars for passenger protection in the 35 mph (56 km/h) frontal impact test. In the side impact test, it received 5 stars for front passenger protection, and 5 stars rear passenger protection. This applies to all other second-generation U-body minivans.

== Export versions ==
From 1990 to 2007, GM Europe imported two generations of US-produced minivans under the Trans Sport nameplate. The GMT199 Trans Sport was based on its American-market namesake (and the Oldsmobile Silhouette) and the GMT200 Trans Sport was a Chevrolet-brand vehicle based on the Pontiac Trans Sport (though adopting the body of the later Pontiac Montana, the nameplate was not used in Europe).

=== First generation (Pontiac/Oldsmobile) ===
For European export, the Pontiac Trans Sport was the sole GMT199 minivan, sold primarily through Opel dealers. Several modifications were made to the design to bring the model line in compliance with European lighting regulations, with the rear lighting clusters receiving amber turn signals; the liftgate was fitted with rear foglamps and enlarged reverse lights, along with mounting for wider European license plates. For 1990 and 1991, the European Trans Sport was fitted with exposed quad headlamps (from the R/V Suburban), with amber turn signal repeaters housed in the clear turn signal lenses. For 1992, the American-style composite headlamp housing were introduced (with glass lenses), with the turn signal repeaters moved behind the front wheels. The export version also was fitted with four bumper-mounted headlamp washers (for both high and low beams), replaced by two for 1994.

With the mid-cycle revision of the model line for 1994, the European Trans Sport largely became a Pontiac-badged version of the Oldsmobile Silhouette (retaining the previous hoodline and headlamps). Though the new Trans Sport retained its roofline styling, the model had lost nearly all its lower body cladding and its Pontiac grille (adopting an Oldsmobile-style split grille above the license plate). After the 1996 model year, the export Trans Sport moved to the GMT200 generation (shared with the Opel/Vauxhall Sintra) and was rebranded as a Chevrolet.

The export Trans Sport was initially offered with a 2.3L Quad 4 (LD2) I4 engine paired with a 5-speed manual transmission (a combination never offered in North America); from 1992, the 3800 3.8L V6 and 4T60 4-speed automatic transmission was offered as an option. In Belgium they were used by the now-defunct gendarmerie.

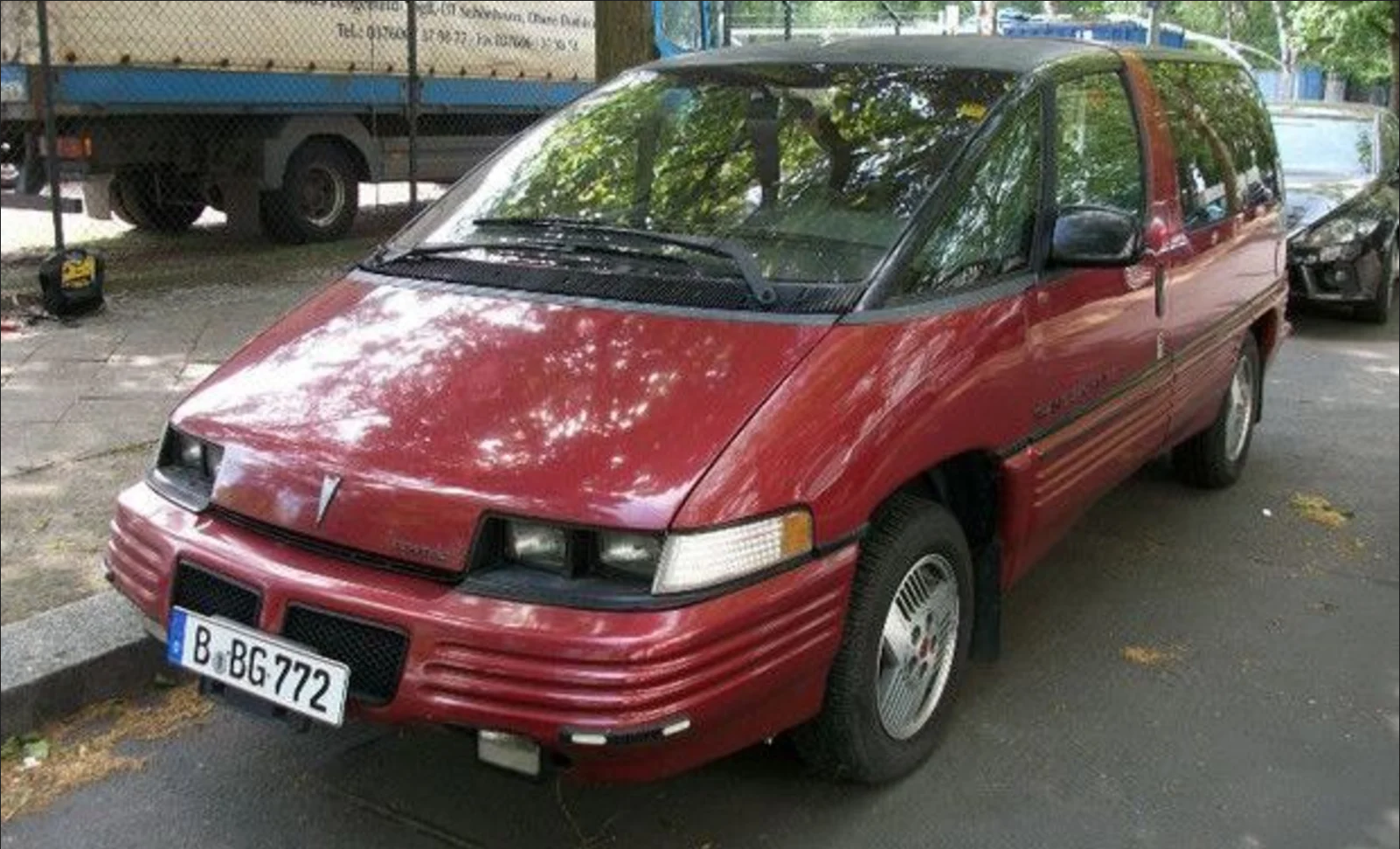
1990–1991 Pontiac Trans Sport with capsule headlights (Europe)

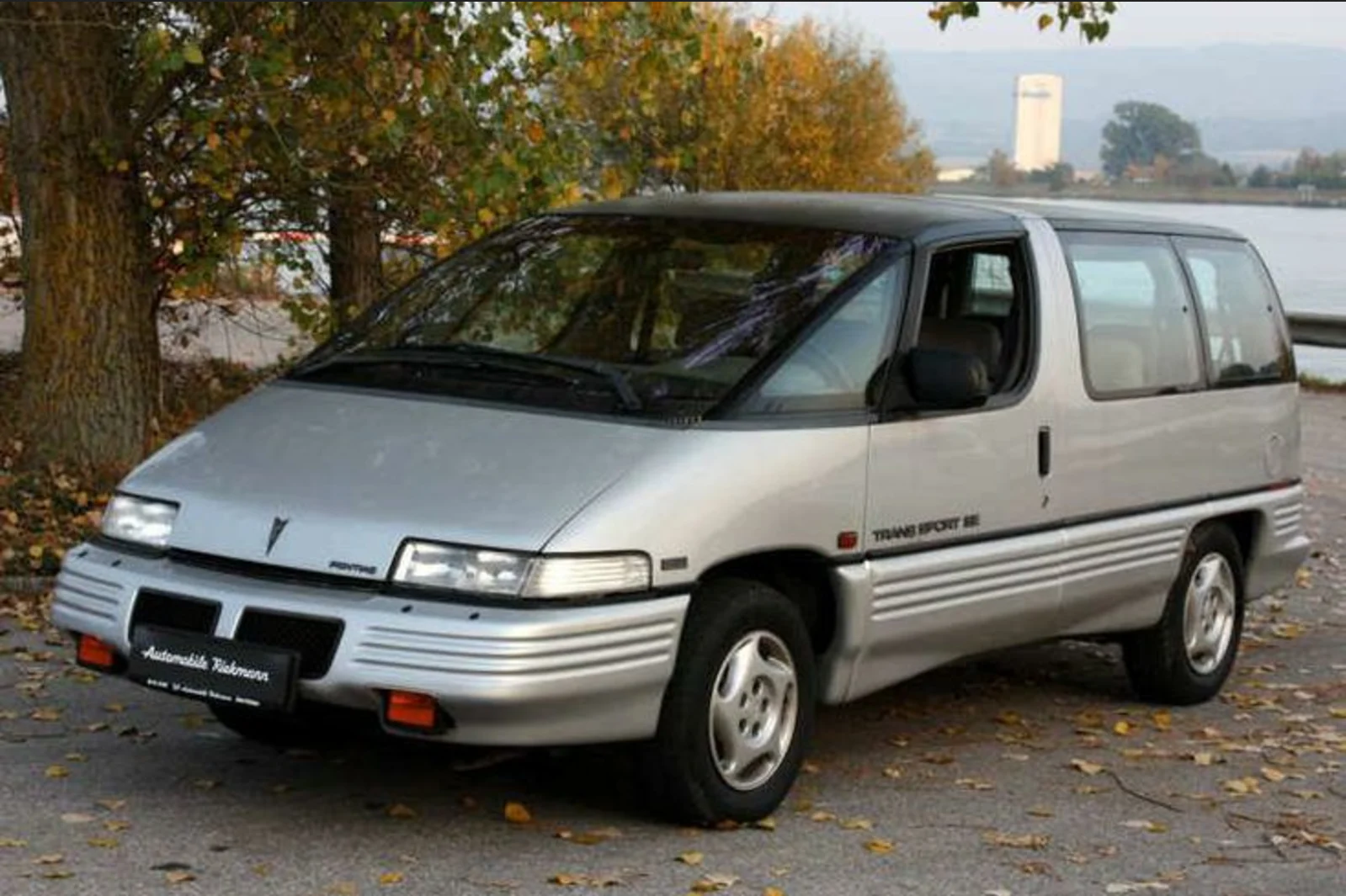
1992–1993 Pontiac Trans Sport with form-fitting headlights (Europe)

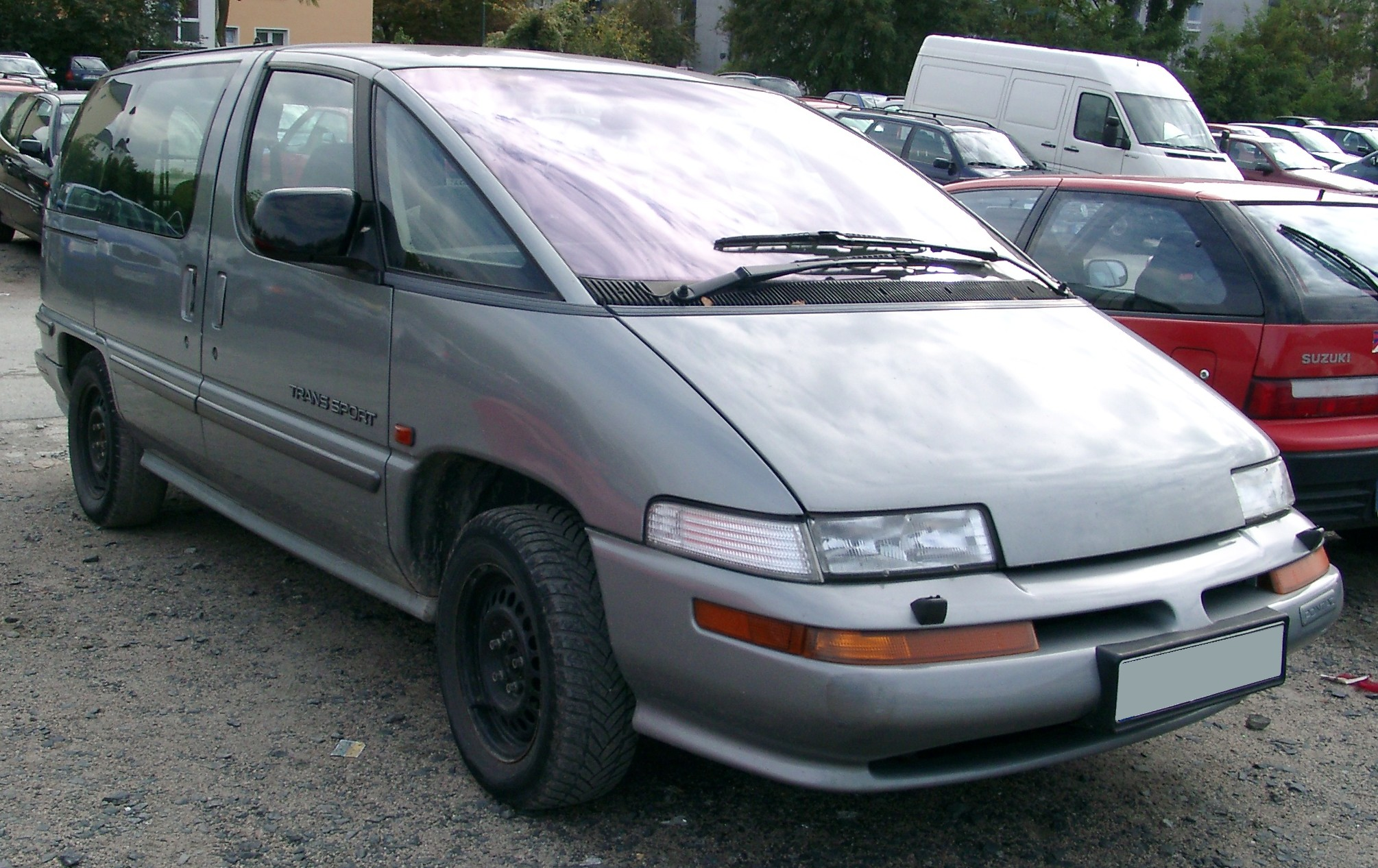
1994–1996 Pontiac Trans Sport based on Oldsmobile Silhouette (Europe)

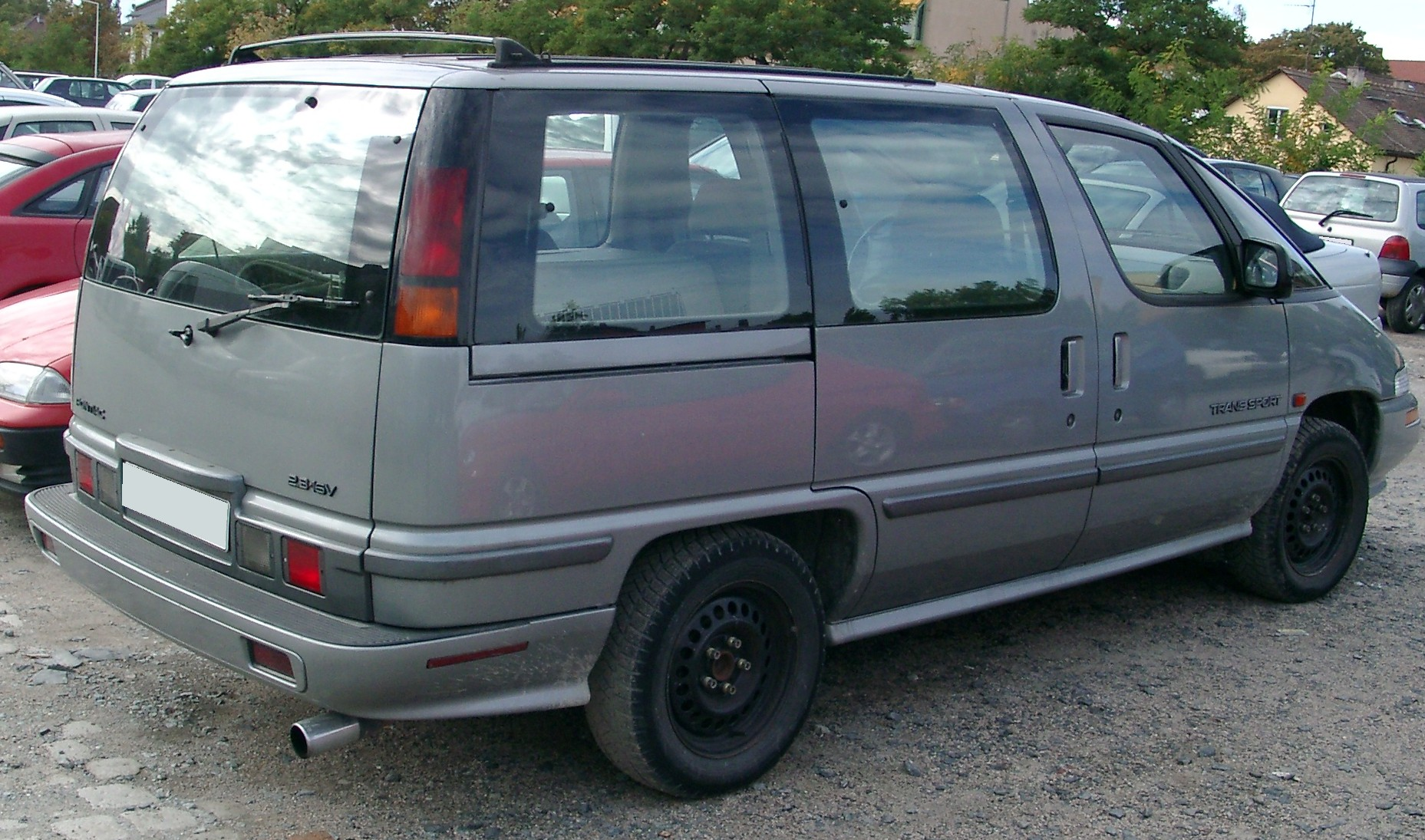
1994–1996 Pontiac Trans Sport (rear view)

=== Second generation (Chevrolet) ===
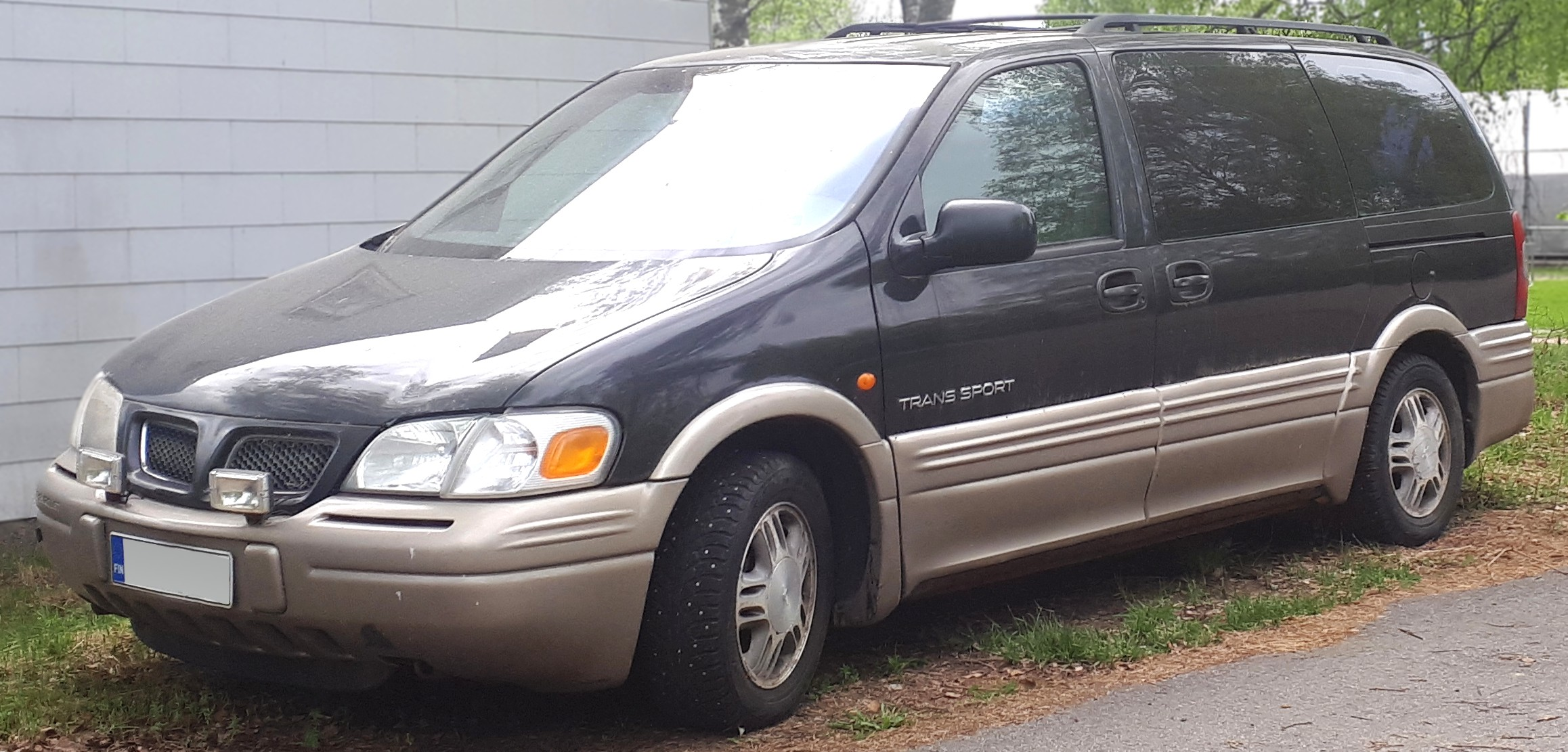
2001 Chevrolet Trans Sport (Pontiac Montana) in Finland

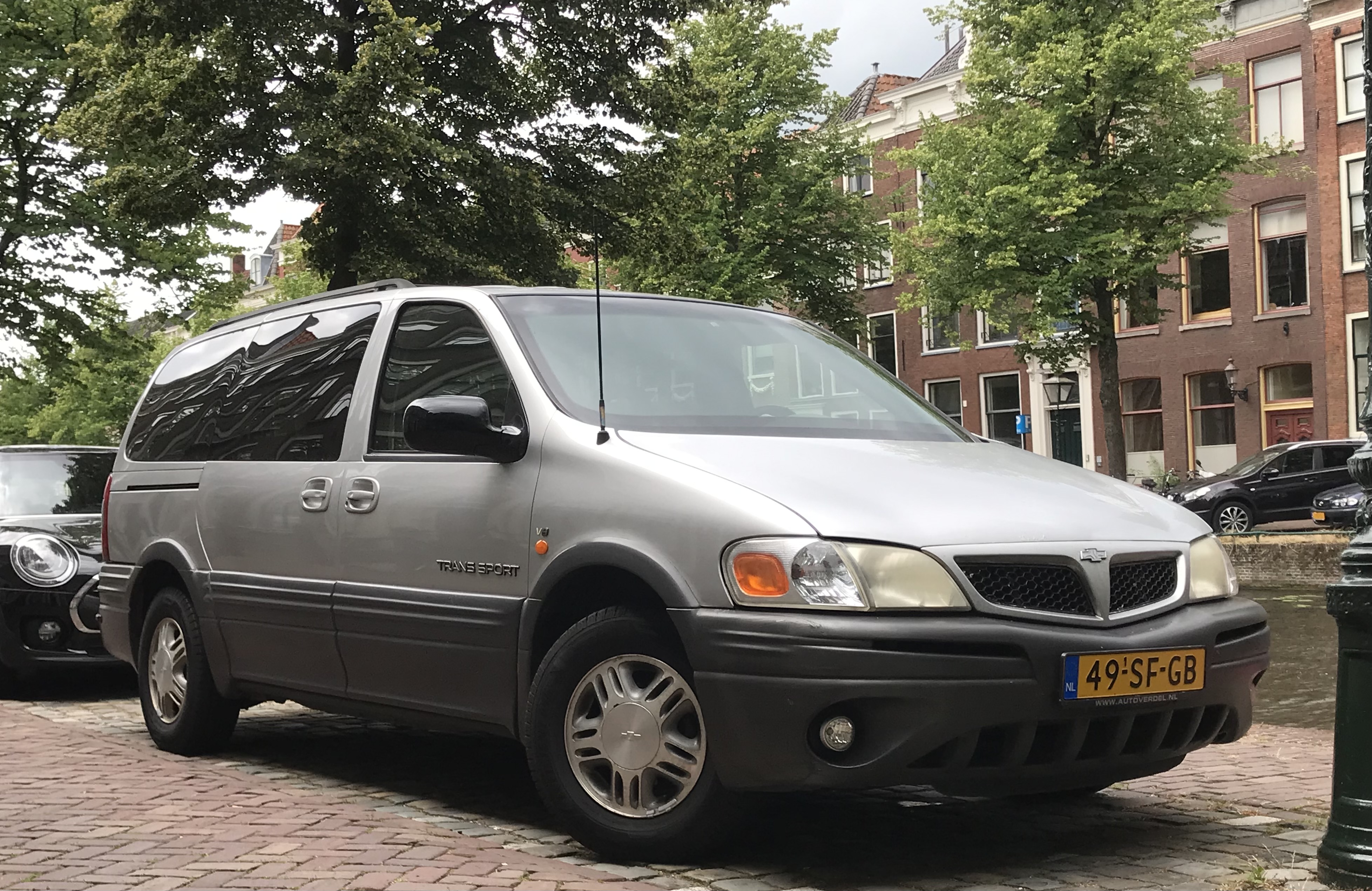
2002 Chevrolet Trans Sport (Netherlands)

The GMT200 generation of the Pontiac Trans Sport was introduced in Europe for 1997, branded as the Chevrolet Trans Sport. With the exception of badging and wheels (from the Chevrolet Venture), the Chevrolet Trans Sport was trimmed identically to its Pontiac namesake. As with the previous generation, the export model line differed from its American-market counterpart primarily in changes related to compliance with ECE regulations, requiring different front headlamps, turn signal repeaters, amber turn signals, and rear foglamps; different seat belts are required, along with multiple other safety-related items.

On the GMT200 platform, both the Chevrolet and Pontiac Trans Sport (later Pontiac Montana) were designed alongside the Opel/Vauxhall Sintra (the first/only Opels built in the United States). Following the 1999 discontinuation of the Sintra in Europe, the Trans Sport largely served as its replacement. After GMT200 production ended after 2005, sales of European dealer stock continued through 2007. Despite limited sales in most of Europe, the Chevrolet Trans Sport was particularly successful in Sweden where it was the best selling minivan for a while.

== See also ==
- Oldsmobile Silhouette
- Chevrolet Lumina APV
