= Pontiac Montana =

Minivan

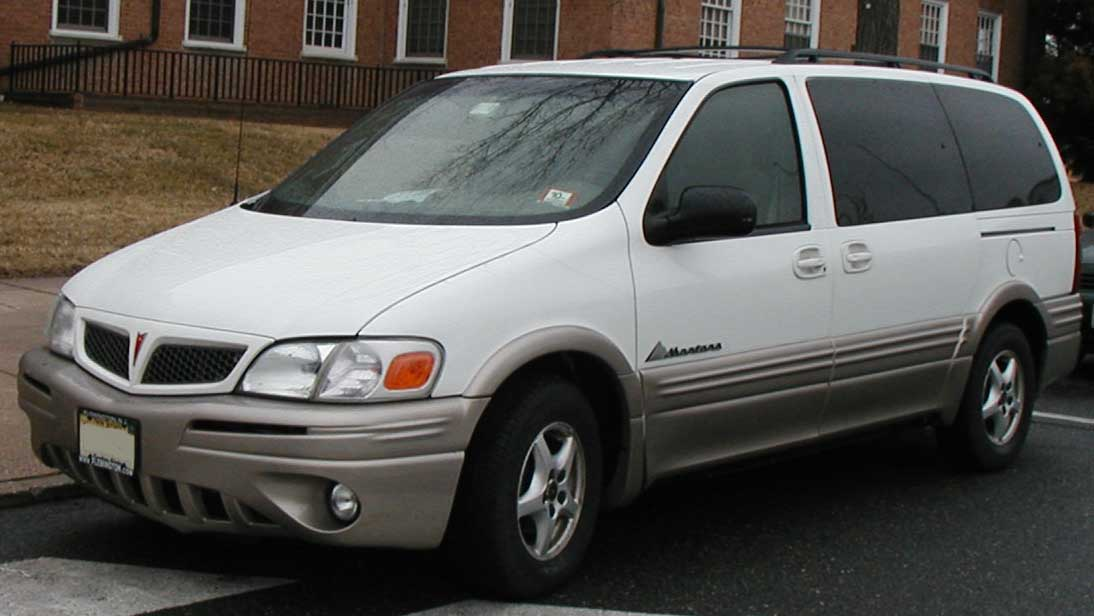

Overview
- Manufacturer: Pontiac (General Motors)
- Also called: Pontiac Trans Sport Montana (1997–1998, US; 1997–1999, Canada); Pontiac Montana SV6 (2005–2009; second generation)
- Production: 1997–2009
- Assembly: United States: Doraville, Georgia (Doraville Assembly)

Body and chassis
- Class: Minivan
- Layout: Transverse front-engine, front-wheel drive / all-wheel drive
- Platform: GM U platform

Chronology
- Predecessor: Pontiac Trans Sport

The Pontiac Montana (also known as Pontiac Montana SV6 for its second generation) is a minivan that was sold by Pontiac from the 1997 to 2009 model years. The successor to the Pontiac Trans Sport, the nameplate was introduced in 1997 as a trim package for its predecessor. For 1999, Pontiac introduced the Montana as a distinct model line (2000 in Canada). Initially marketed between the Chevrolet Venture and the Oldsmobile Silhouette, the model line was later slotted between the Chevrolet Uplander, Saturn Relay, and Buick Terraza.

Styled as the most "rugged" of the GM minivans, the Montana was styled with two-tone lower body cladding evoking the design of SUVs, with the second-generation Montana SV6 (introduced for 2005) adopting more aggressive exterior styling and optional all-wheel drive. The SV6 was discontinued in the United States after 2006 (following slow sales), with Pontiac continuing to sell the model line in Canada and Mexico through 2009 (a year before the closure of Pontiac). Since the introduction of the original "Dustbuster" generation, Pontiac Trans Sports and Montanas were the most popular minivans among consumers in Canada.

General Motors assembled the Pontiac Montana alongside its divisional counterparts at its Doraville Assembly (Doraville, Georgia) facility, which closed on September 26, 2008. The Montana was not replaced within Pontiac in either the United States or Canada. As the GMT200 platform was replaced by the fullsize GM Lambda CUVs, the GMC Acadia served as the closest successor.

== First generation (1997) ==
First generation
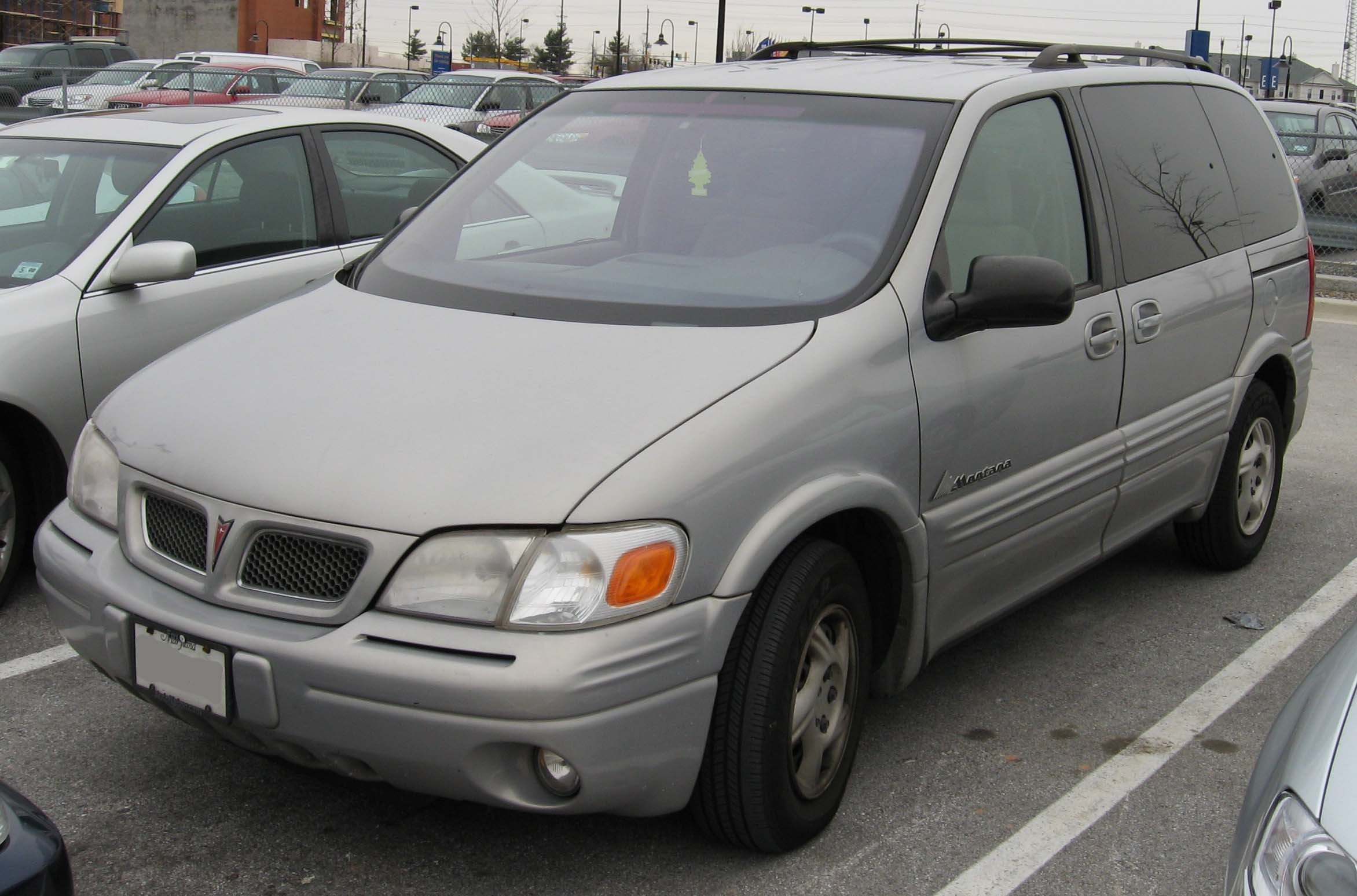

Overview
- Also called: Pontiac Trans Sport (USA, 1996–1998; Canada, 1996–1999); Chevrolet Trans Sport (Europe, 1997–2004)
- Production: July 1996 – September 2004
- Model years: 1997–2005

Body and chassis
- Body style: 3-door minivan 4-door minivan
- Related: Buick GL8; Chevrolet Venture/Trans Sport; Oldsmobile Silhouette; Opel/Vauxhall Sintra; Pontiac Aztek

Powertrain
- Engine: 3.4 L (207 CID) LA1 V6

Dimensions
- Wheelbase: SWB: 112.0 in (2,845 mm); LWB: 120.0 in (3,048 mm)
- Length: SWB: 187.3 in (4,757 mm); 1999–2000 & 2003–05 LWB: 201.3 in (5,113 mm); 2001–02 LWB: 200.9 in (5,103 mm)
- Width: 1999–2000 & 2003–05: 72.7 in (1,847 mm); 2001–02: 72.0 in (1,829 mm)
- Height: LWB: 68.1 in (1,730 mm); SWB: 67.4 in (1,712 mm)
- Curb weight: 3,730 lb (1,690 kg) (SWB); 3,942 lb (1,788 kg) (LWB)

The Montana nameplate was first used as a trim level of the Pontiac Trans Sport minivan for the 1997–1998 model years. GM dropped the Trans Sport name in 1998 for MY1999 (1999 for MY2000 in Canada respectively) and the van simply became Montana. It was related to the Chevrolet Venture, the Oldsmobile Silhouette, the Opel/Vauxhall Sintra, and the first generation Buick GL8.

The Opel and Vauxhall models were only sold in Europe, even though they were made in the same factory in the U.S. as with the other U-body minivans. Chevrolet also introduced a nearly identical twin to Pontiac save for its badging for European consumers, named as the Chevrolet Trans Sport. The 2000–2010 GL8 is similar to the first-generation Pontiac Montana, while the 2010–2016 GL8 and 2005–2016 GL8 First Land is similar to the later Pontiac Montana SV6. Both generations of the Buick GL8 minivans were only sold in China.

Despite the redesign of the Montana as the Montana SV6 in 2005, Pontiac continued to sell the original body style for the 2005 model year for fleet use. The last Montana rolled off the production line in September 2004.

=== Chassis ===
The Pontiac Montana is based on the GMT200 platform (aka "U-body" in VIN designations), used by the Venture, Silhouette, Sintra, and the first-generation GL8. The new platform uses a unibody type chassis as opposed to the older, uniquely-designed space frame type chassis used in the GMT199 platform minivans. The short wheelbase version measured 112-inches, while the long wheelbase version measured 120-inches. The minivan uses disk brakes for the front wheels and drum brakes for the rear wheels, and uses front MacPherson struts with rear coil over springs.

==== Powertrain details ====
The Pontiac Montana continues to use the 180 hp (134 kW) 3.4 L V6 engine from the second-generation Pontiac Trans Sport. A four-speed automatic transmission continues to be offered as standard equipment.

=== Body ===
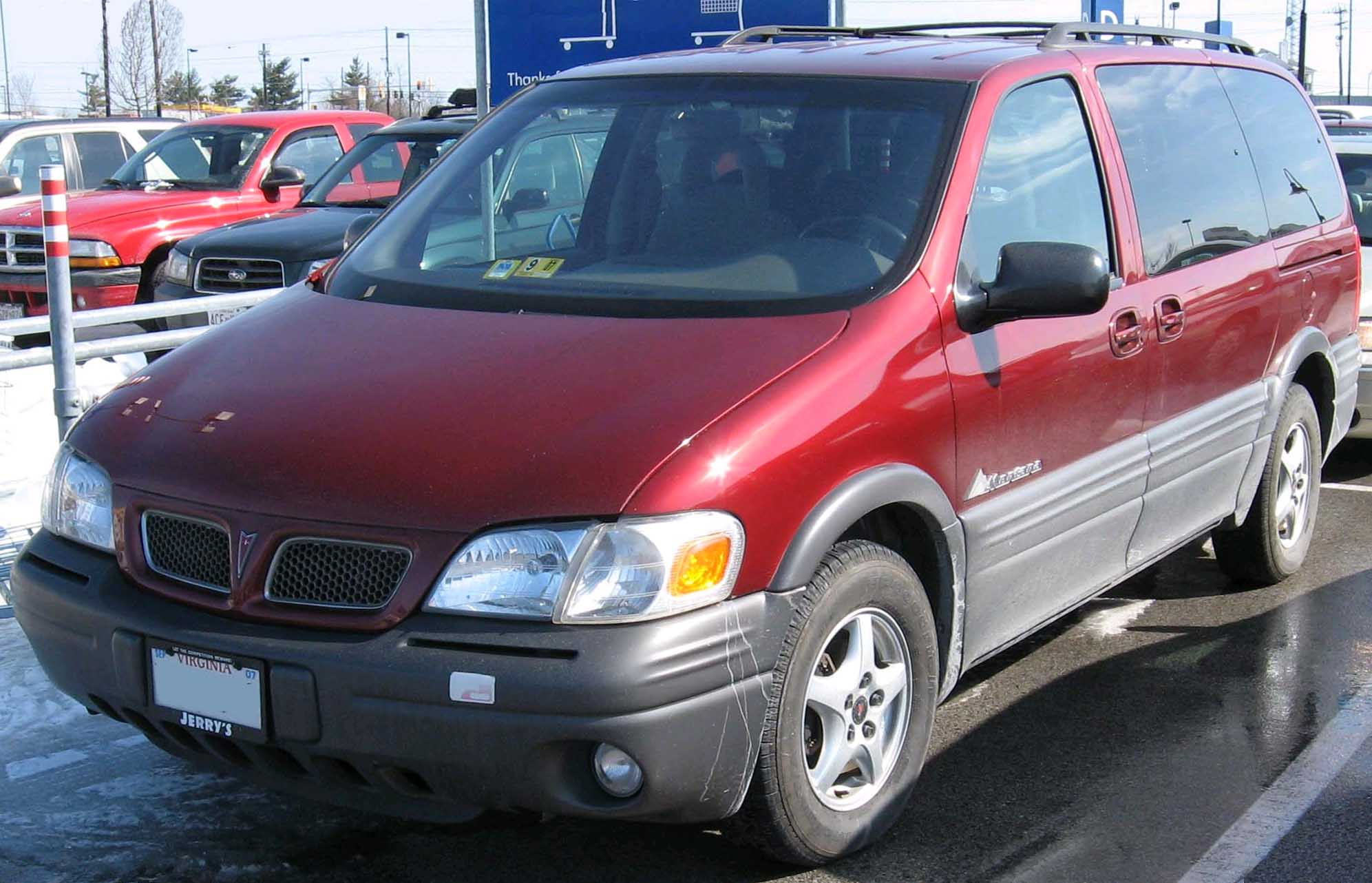
1999–2000 Pontiac Montana LWB 4-door (two-tone body)

The Pontiac Montana was designed with a more conventional (and conservative) styling reminiscent of the third-generation Dodge/Chrysler/Plymouth minivans, moving away from the "Dustbuster" look of the previous generation U-body minivans. It came in both short and long wheelbase versions. It was initially produced with single or dual sliding doors when it was introduced as a trim level in MY1997, however dual sliding doors would become standard by 1998 when the van became Montana for MY1999. The B-pillars continued to be colored in black in most color choices but were also made as the same color as the body in some color choices.

The interior remained largely the same as the second-generation Trans Sport, including the steering wheel, instrument cluster, and the like. Three seating configurations were available, with eight-passenger (2-3-3) and seven-passenger versions (2-2-3, 2-3-2) being offered. Second-row modular seats with hidden child restraints were available in 2-3-3, 2-3-2, and 2-2-3 configurations, while the rear bench seats (split or full-length) were offered in 2-2-3 configurations. The Pontiac Montana (as well as other U-body minivans) was one of the few minivans which provided seating for eight. The seats were offered in both cloth and leather surfaces, with the latter being an option. New for this generation were cabin air filters, which can be easily accessed from behind an access panel inside the glove compartment. OnStar continues to be offered as an option.

==== Later model years ====
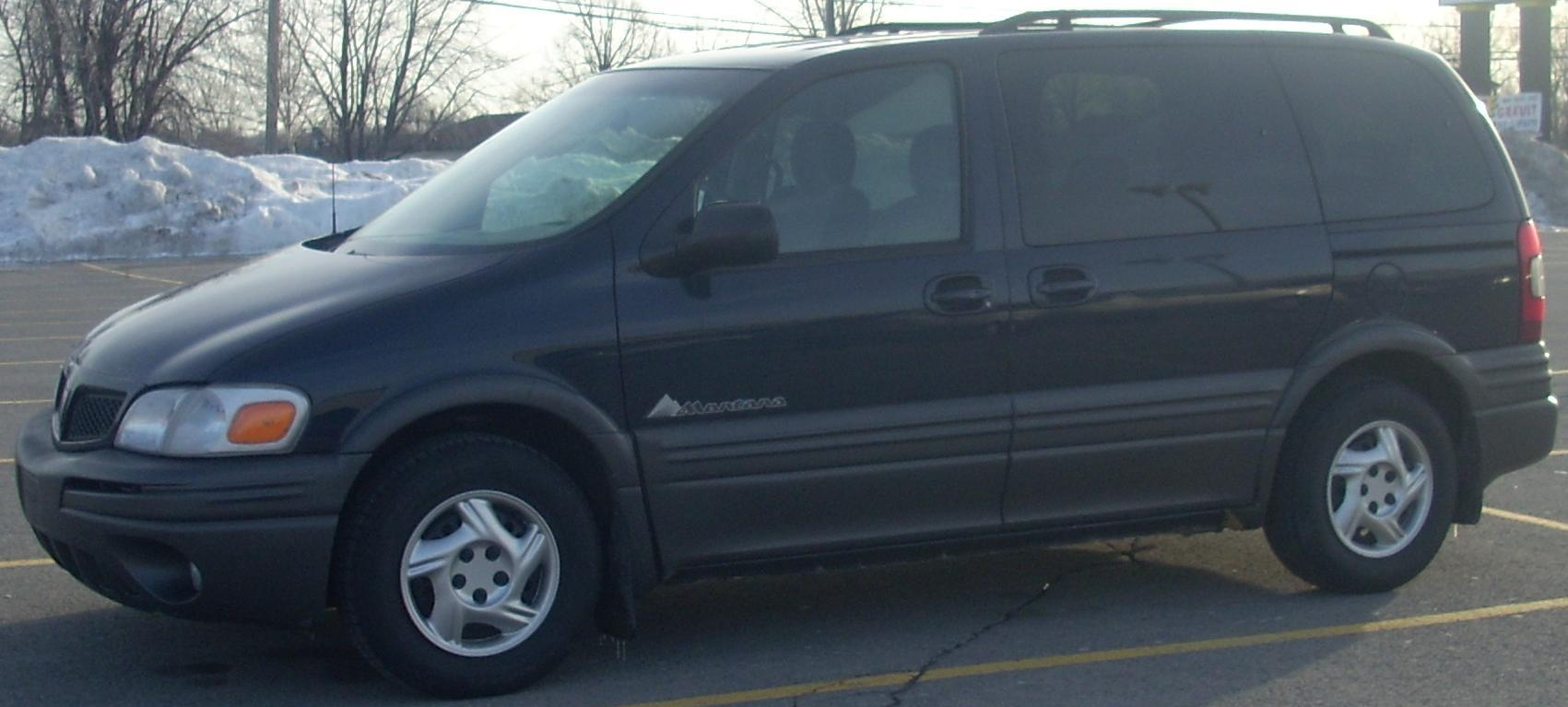
2001–2005 Pontiac Montana SWB 4-door

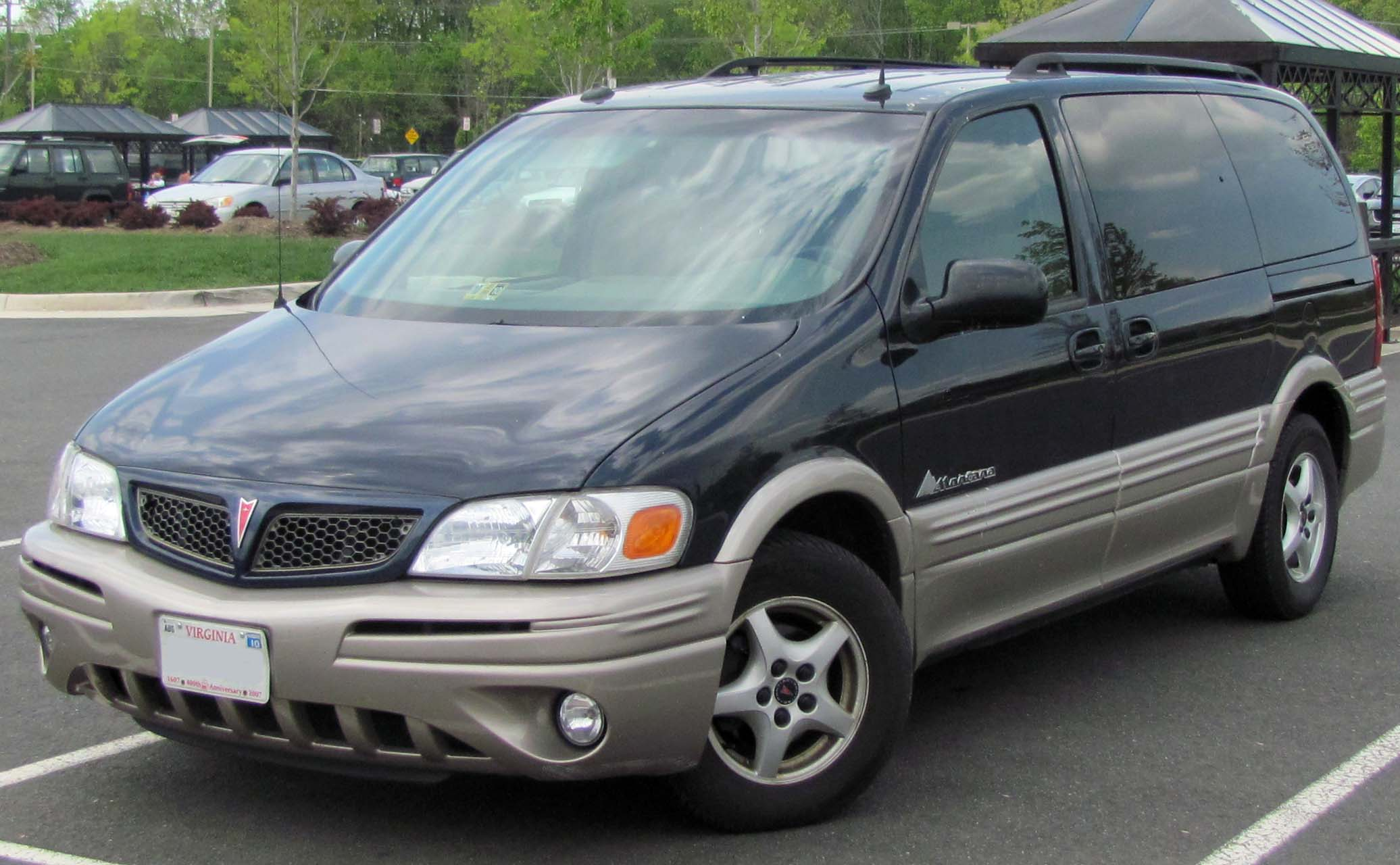
2001–2005 Pontiac Montana LWB 4-door

For 1999, two variations of the door/ignition warning chimes were used in the Montana, one that was carried over from the second-generation Trans Sport/Trans Sport Montana and the other was a different-sounding one used in other models.

For 2000, the instrument cluster was redesigned, and the different-sounding door/ignition warning chime offered in the previous model year was adopted for all models. No other changes were made to the exterior and interior of the vehicle.

For 2001, the Montana received a minor facelift, with a new front bumper and split grille design, the red markers on the rear bumpers being removed, the B-pillars becoming body-colored as opposed to black in most cases, and a new steering wheel that has, among others, removed the audio control buttons and the "PONTIAC" lettering on the airbag replaced with the Pontiac logo.

For 2003, the sport-style head restraints were dropped in favor of the conventional head restraints that were offered on the Venture and Silhouette. The anti-lock brakes became optional for the Montana as well as for the Venture, but remained as standard equipment for the Silhouette before the demise of the Oldsmobile brand in 2004. A new steering wheel with a completely different design than the previous one was also introduced.

=== Trim ===
The standard trim was simply named as the Montana. In contrast to the Trans Sport Montana, which exclusively featured grey/tan body cladding, the Montana offered both monochrome and grey/tan body cladding for all colors. Two rim choices for the wheels continued to be offered. A Montana GT trim came in later in the early 2000s.

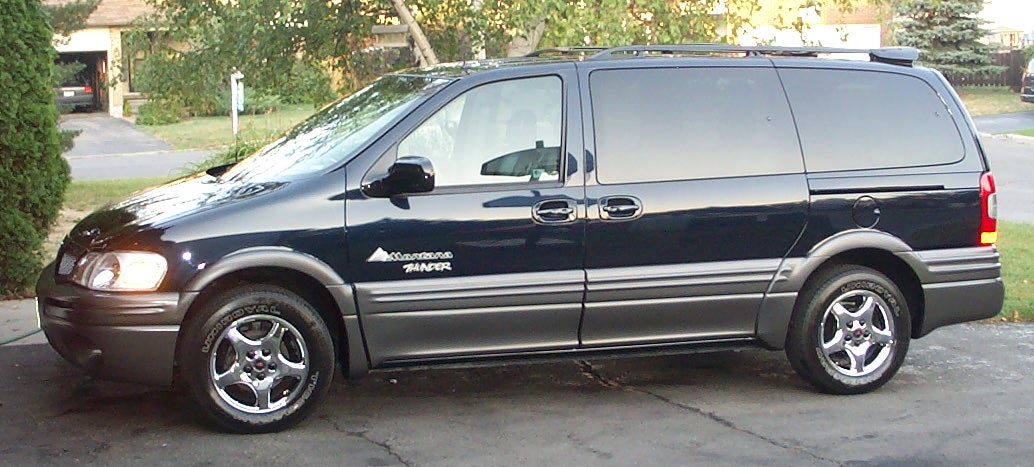
2002 Pontiac Montana Thunder

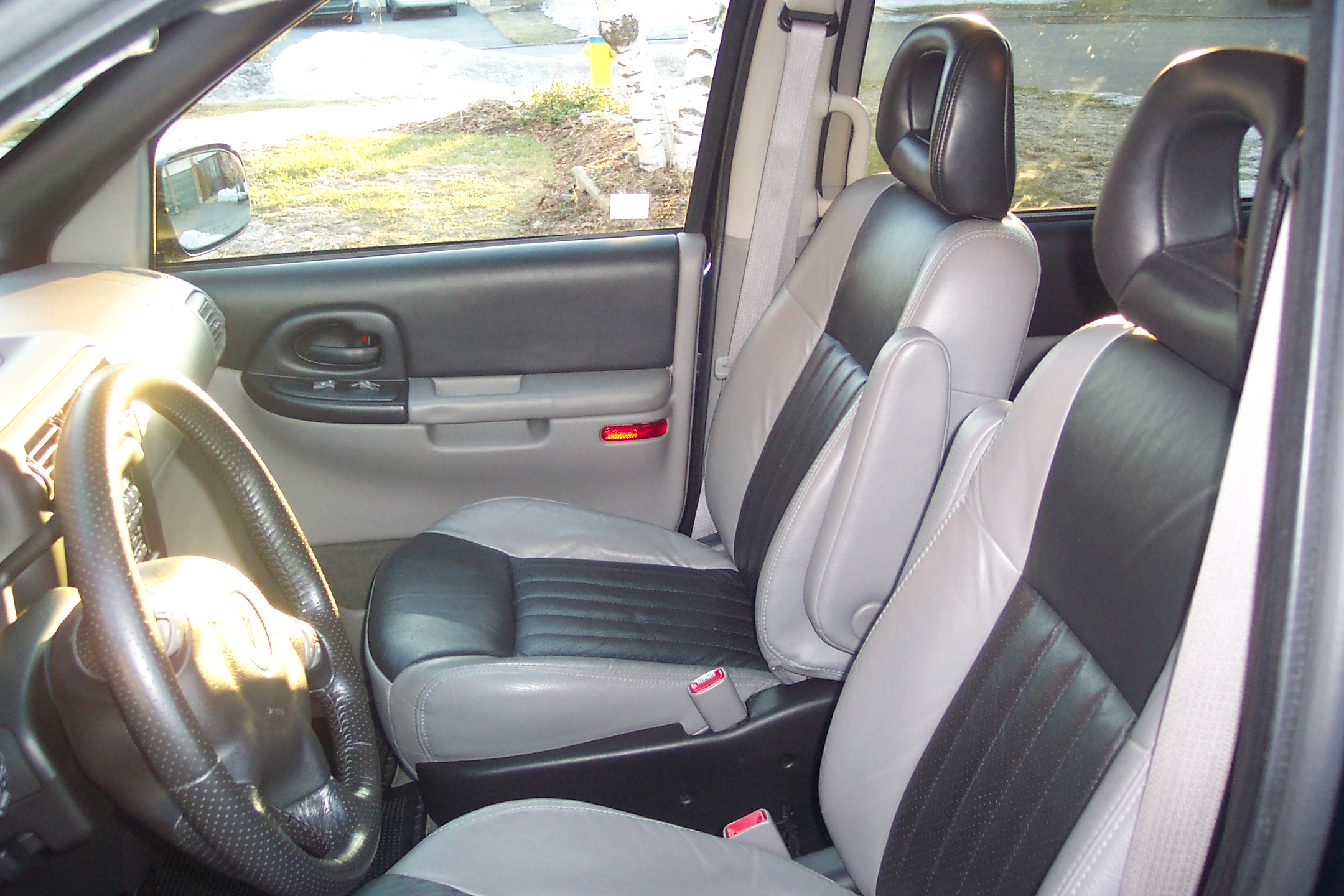
Interior of the 2002 Pontiac Montana Thunder

The Montana Thunder was introduced in 2002 as the most up-level model of the Montana. It featured special "Thunder" badging, Thunder-specific 16" chrome 5-spoke wheels, upgraded ride and handling package, and a special spoiler on the back of the roof rack. Inside, it had special two-tone black and grey leather seating, and a perforated leather-wrapped steering wheel. Prior to its introduction in 2002, the Montana Thunder nameplate was first used on a 1998 minivan concept showcased at the 1998 North American International Auto Show.

The Thunder trim package was produced in 2002 and 2003, however it was made as an optional package on Montana GTs in 2004 called the "Chrome-Sport" package. Only the "Thunder" badges were discontinued. A rare AWD Versatrak version was offered around the same timeframe as the Thunder trim package, which was mostly identical to the Thunder except for the headrests, which had a different design.

=== Safety criticism ===
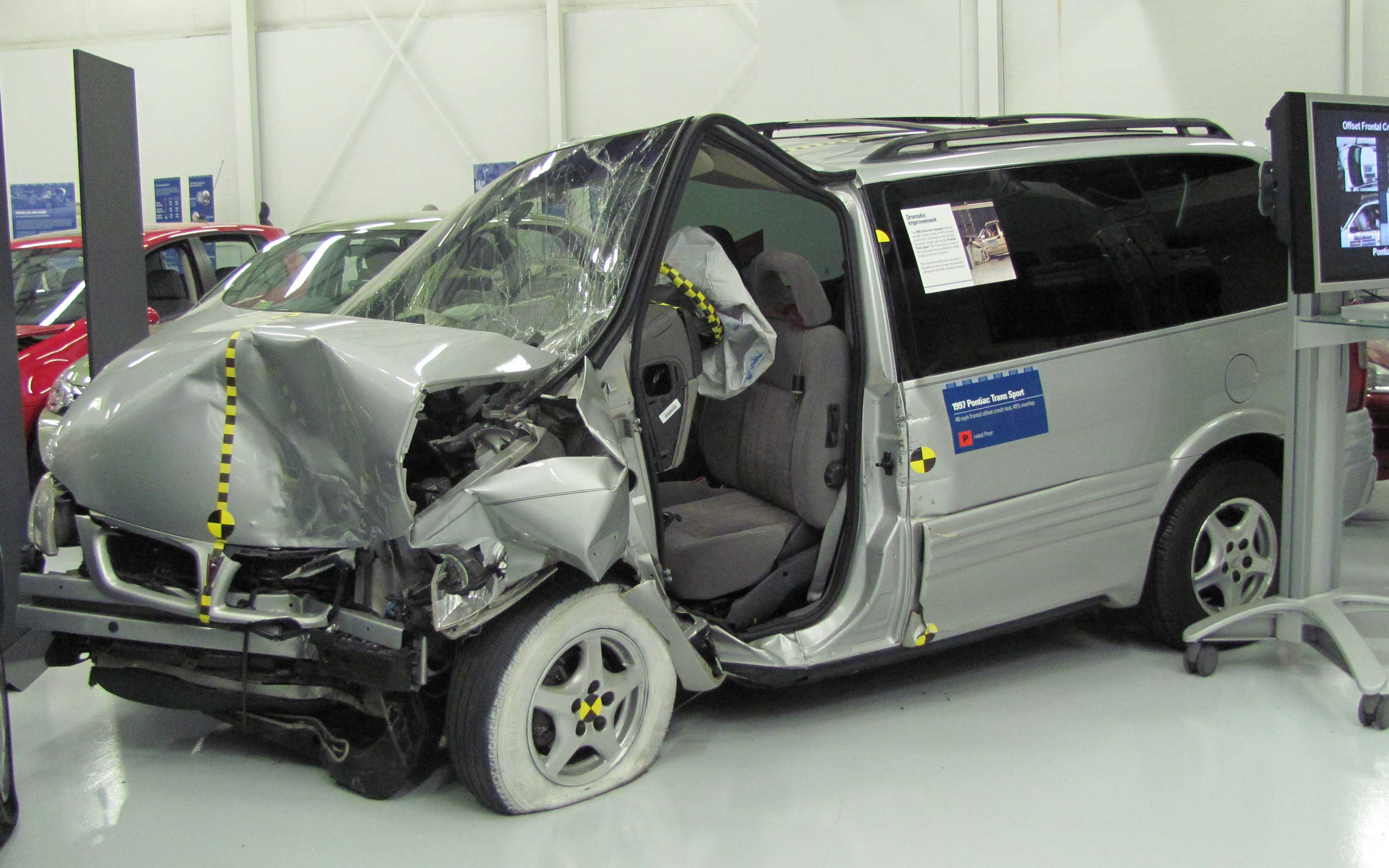
The 1997 Pontiac Trans Sport crash-tested by the Insurance Institute for Highway Safety

In 1996, the Insurance Institute for Highway Safety (IIHS) crash tested a 1997 Pontiac Trans Sport (the predecessor of the Montana) among other minivans of the time. The minivan suffered extreme damage to the vehicle in the 40 mph (64 km/h) moderate overlap crash test, which has resulted in some criticism by contemporary reviewers. The minivan received a "Poor" rating and was ranked as the "Worst Performing Vehicle" by the institute as a result. This status was also applied to the Chevrolet Venture and the Oldsmobile Silhouette as they both use the same chassis and body design, including the later first-generation Pontiac Montana.

Some comments made by the IIHS after the first test in 1996 were:

- Major collapse of the occupant compartment left little survival space for the driver.
- Extreme steering wheel movement snapped the dummy's head backward.
- The unnatural position of the dummy's left foot indicates that an occupant's left leg would have been seriously injured in a real-world crash of this severity.
- The forces on the left lower leg were so high that the dummy's metal foot broke off at the ankle.

In a semi-related event, the Trans Sport/Montana's European equivalent, the Opel/Vauxhall Sintra, also fared badly in Euro NCAP's frontal impact crash test on a 1998 model year minivan, made worse by the steering wheel (and airbag) breaking off from the dashboard (a phenomenon that was not present in the IIHS test). Despite performing well in the side impact test, it rated 2.5 stars as a result.

The safety issues of the Trans Sport/Montana and its U-body siblings were later addressed with the Montana SV6 (and the related Uplander), which earned the highest rating of "Good" given by the institute in the moderate overlap crash test.

The National Highway Traffic Safety Administration gave the van 4 stars for driver protection and 3 stars for passenger protection in the 35 mph (56 km/h) frontal impact test. In the side impact test, it received 5 stars for front passenger protection, and 5 stars rear passenger protection. This applies to all other second-generation U-body minivans.

== Second generation (2005) ==
Second generation
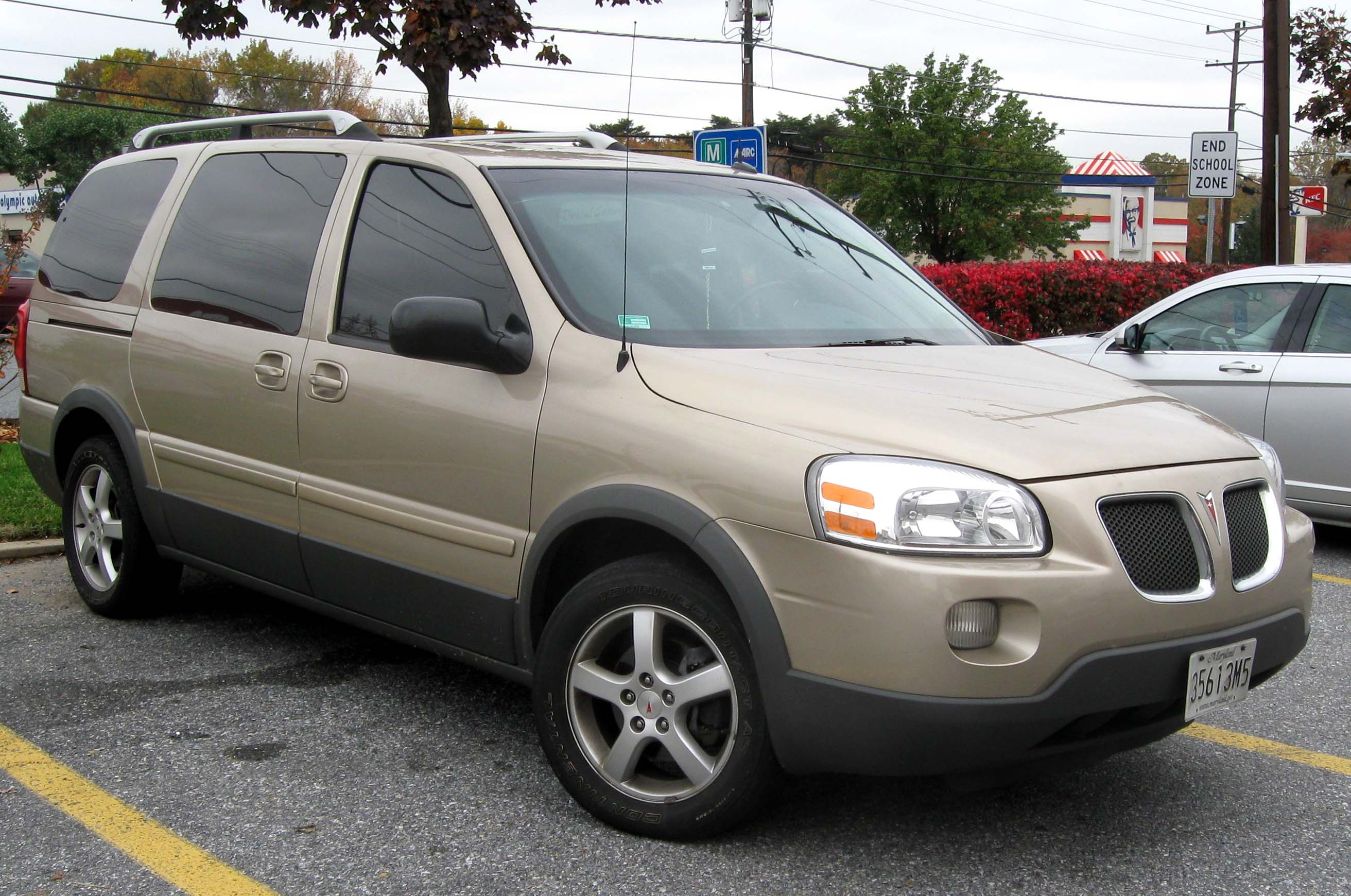

Overview
- Also called: Pontiac Montana SV6
- Production: September 2004–July 7, 2006 (United States); September 2004–September 26, 2008 (Canada and Mexico)
- Model years: 2005–2006 (United States); 2005–2009 (Canada and Mexico)

Body and chassis
- Body style: 4-door minivan
- Related: Buick GL8; Buick Terraza; Chevrolet Uplander; Saturn Relay

Powertrain
- Engine: 3.5 L LX9 V6; 3.9 L LZ9 V6; 3.9 L LGD V6 (Canada only)
- Transmission: 4-Speed 4T65-E automatic

Dimensions
- Wheelbase: LWB: 121.1 in (3,076 mm); SWB: 113.0 in (2,870 mm)
- Length: 2005 SWB: 191.0 in (4,851 mm); 2006–09 SWB: 190.9 in (4,849 mm); LWB: 205.6 in (5,222 mm)
- Width: 72.0 in (1,829 mm)
- Height: LWB: 72.0 in (1,829 mm); SWB: 70.5 in (1,791 mm)

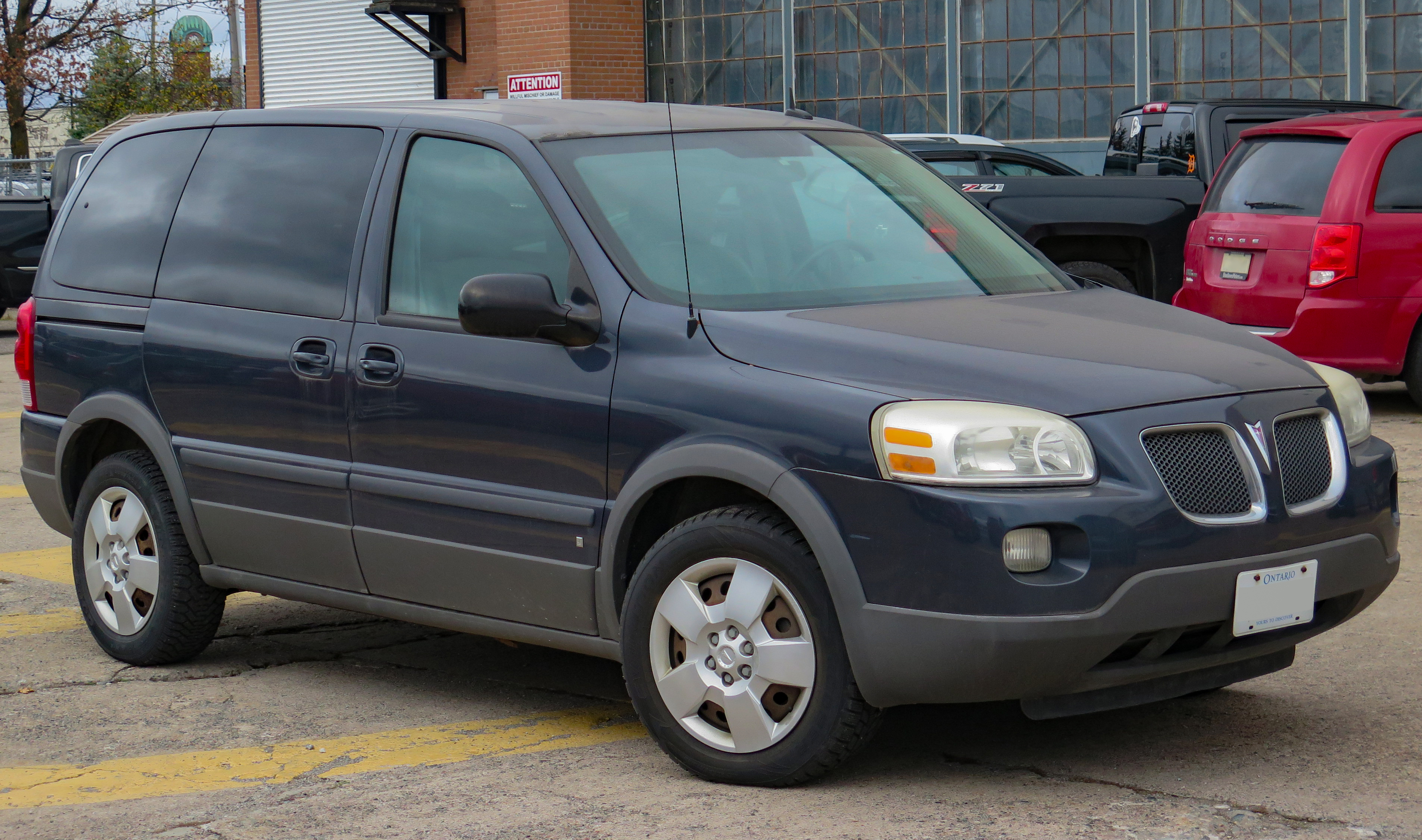

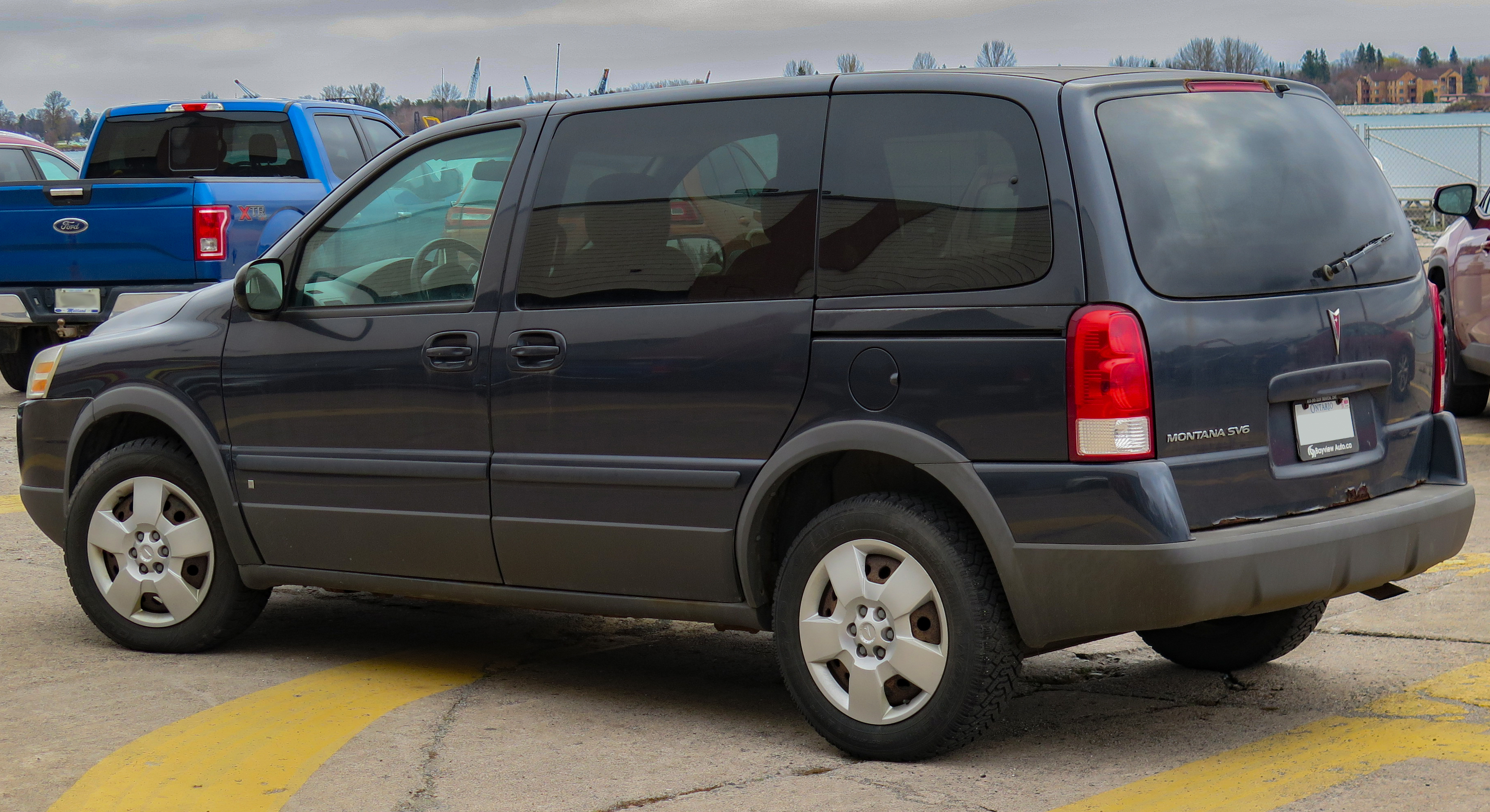
2008 Pontiac Montana SV6 RWB (Canada)

For the 2005 model year, the Montana was restyled with a higher, SUV-like front clip, with a name change to Montana SV6. The 2005 Montana SV6 used a 3.5 L High Value 3500 LX9 V6 that generated 200 hp (150 kW) and 220 ft⋅lbf (300 N⋅m). For 2006, a 3.9 L LZ9 V6, with 240 hp (179 kW) and 240 lb·ft (332 Nm) torque, was added as an option, and the vehicle added GM badges to the front doors. For 2007, the 3.5 L V6 was dropped, leaving the 3.9 L as the base engine. Consequently, the optional AWD system was also dropped, since it could not handle the torque of the 3.9 L engine. A flex-fuel version of the 3.9 L V6 also became available for the SV6 in 2007, exclusively in Canada and Mexico.

Similar to the Chevrolet Uplander, Saturn Relay, and Buick Terraza, it was the second-costliest of its cousins. In the United States and Mexico only the long-wheelbase version was sold.

In Mexico, the Montana continued until the 2009 model year, with the 3.9 L V6 as the only engine option. General Motors marketed it as the Pontiac Montana SV6, and it was almost identical to the discontinued US version, but different from the Canadian-specification model. In some parts of Canada, unsold 2009 models were sold as 2010 models. Some of these were also adapted as city taxis in Toronto and Montreal starting in 2010.

== Discontinuation ==
On November 21, 2005, GM announced that it would close the Doraville, Georgia assembly plant, which produced the SV6, in 2008. However, several months later, GM announced that the SV6 would be discontinued after 2006 in the US due to poor sales, while production for both Canada and Mexico would continue because the SV6 sold better in those markets. The last SV6 for the U.S. market rolled off the assembly line on July 7, 2006. Production ended for Canada and Mexico with the 2009 model year, with the demise of the Pontiac brand a year later and the closing of the Doraville, Georgia plant on September 26, 2008. The last vehicle built was a Canadian-bound Montana SV6 SWB with roof rack in Liquid Silver Metallic, delivered to the Marvin Starr dealership in Scarborough, Ontario. The Montana was discontinued without a direct replacement due to the discontinuation of the Pontiac brand in 2010.

== Sales ==
Calendar year	US Sales
1998	10,819
1999	62,547
2000	59,849
2001	49,416
2002	47,836
2003	39,588
2004	33,629
2005	27,171
2006	13,488
2007	1,385
2008	64
