= Opel Sintra =

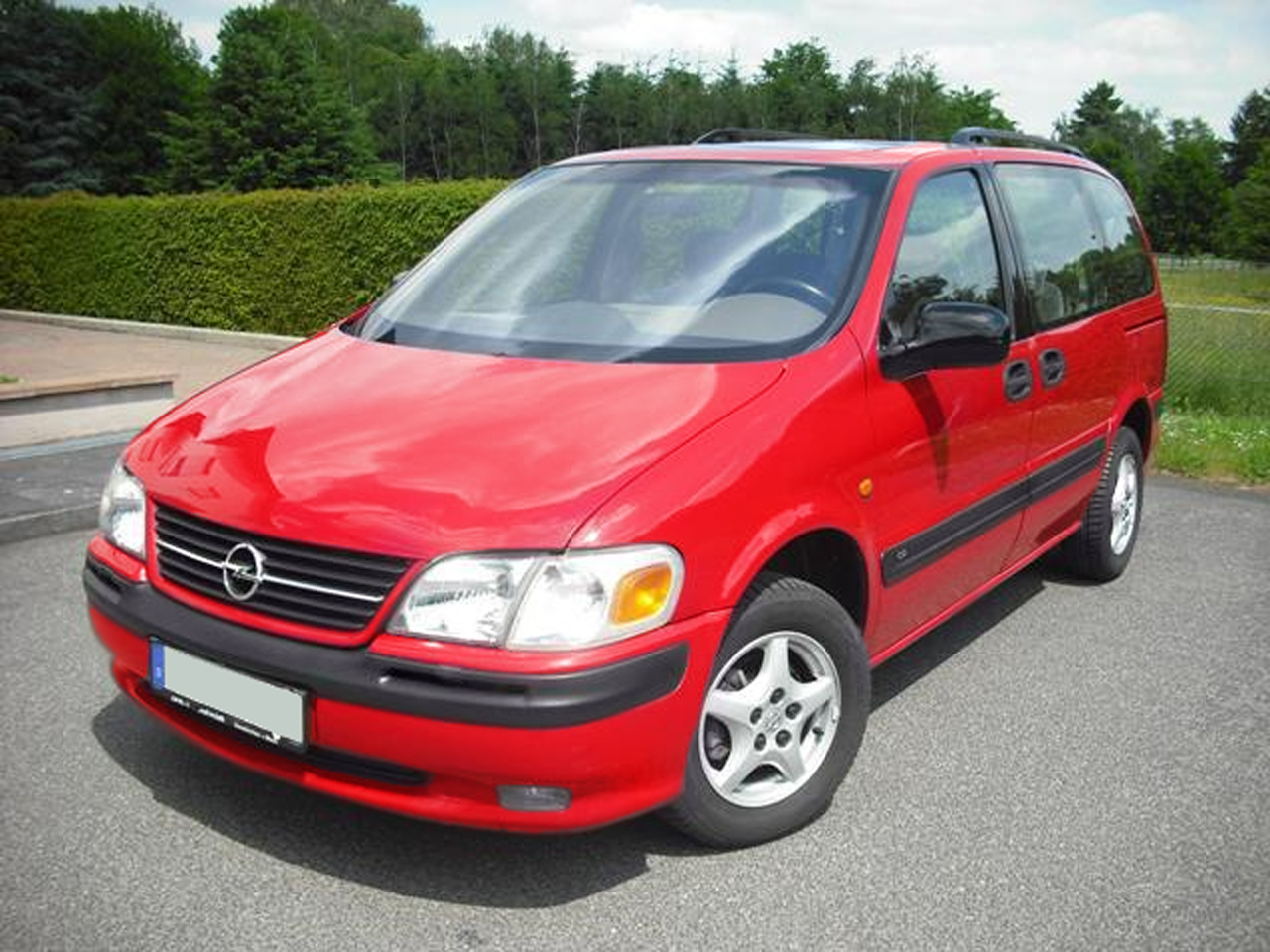

Overview
- Manufacturer: General Motors
- Also called: Vauxhall Sintra (United Kingdom)
- Production: 1996–1999
- Assembly: United States: Doraville, Georgia (Doraville Assembly)

Body and chassis
- Class: Large MPV (M)
- Body style: 4-door MPV
- Layout: Transverse front-engine, front-wheel drive
- Platform: U-body/GMT200
- Related: Chevrolet Venture; Pontiac Trans Sport; Buick GL8 (first generation); Pontiac Montana; Oldsmobile Silhouette

Powertrain
- Engine: Petrol: 2.2 L X22XE I4; 3.0 L X30XE V6; Diesel: 2.2 L X22DTH DTI I4
- Transmission: 5-speed manual 4-speed automatic

Dimensions
- Wheelbase: 2,845 mm (112.0 in)

Chronology
- Successor: Opel Zafira Tourer; Chevrolet Uplander (except United Kingdom)

The Opel Sintra is an automobile produced under the German marque Opel for the market in Europe between 1996 and 1999. It was sold in the United Kingdom as the Vauxhall Sintra. The Sintra was one of the second generation U-body (known internally as GMX110s) large multi-purpose vehicles (MPV). Contrary to popular belief, the name was not inspired by the historic Portuguese town of Sintra, rather, it was chosen by a computer from a list of short, easy to pronounce words which ended in the letter "a", to tie in to Opel's naming scheme at the time.

It was imported to Europe from the United States of America, where General Motors produced identical models under the Chevrolet, Oldsmobile, and Pontiac brands.

== History ==
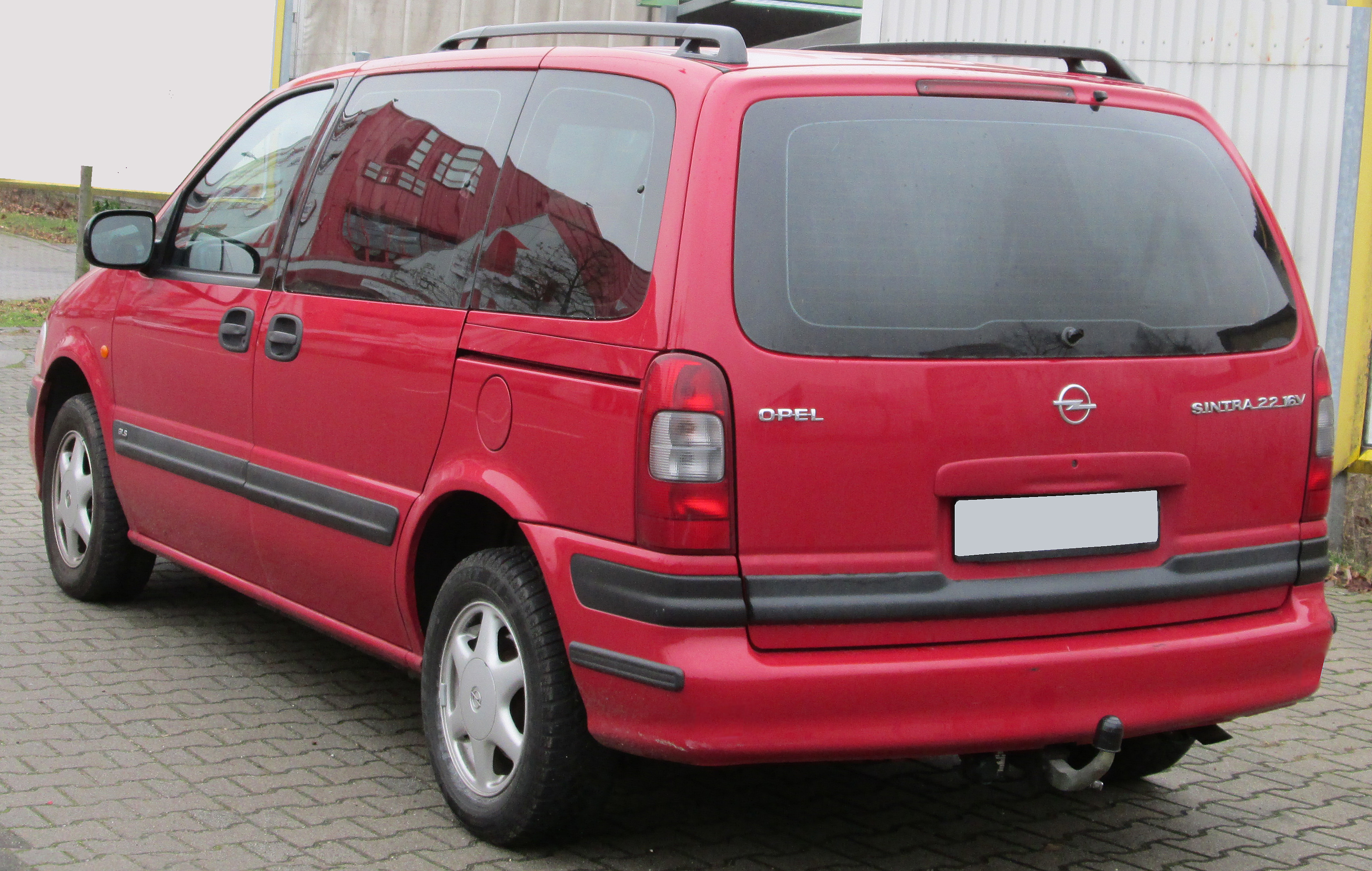
Opel Sintra (rear)

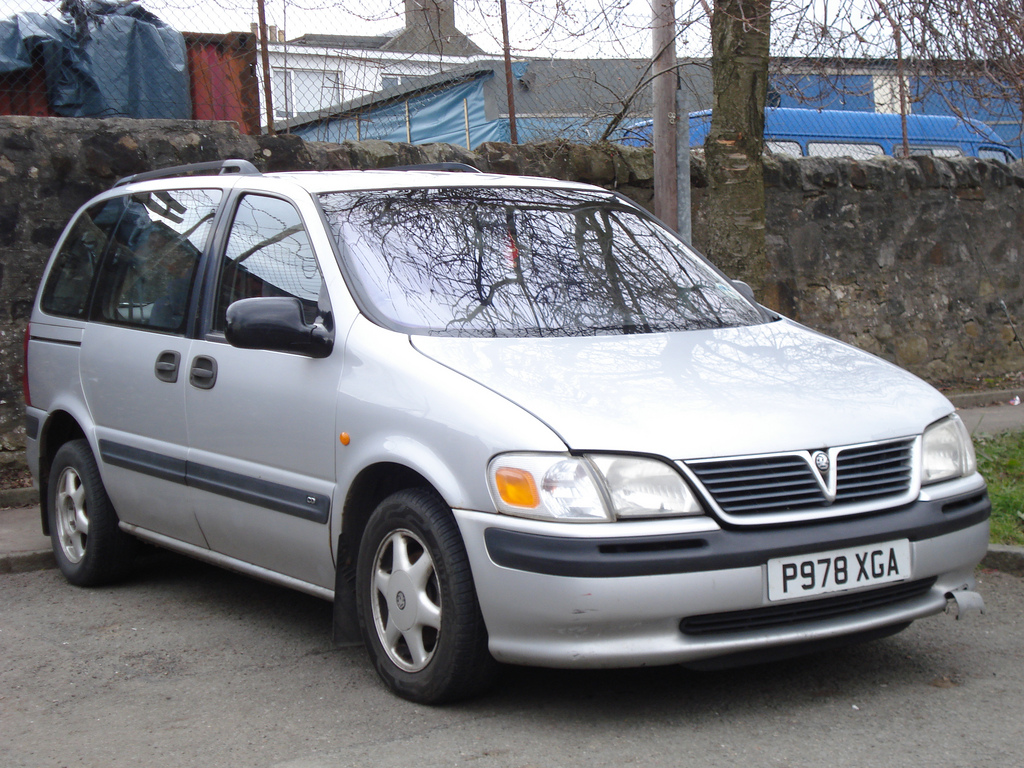
Vauxhall Sintra

The Sintra was specifically based on the short wheelbase version of the second generation U platform and has the same wheelbase, front and rear track as the short wheelbase Chevrolet Venture and Pontiac Montana/Trans Sport, and similar exterior dimensions. Along with other U body minivans, it was made in Doraville, Georgia, United States. For the British market, a Vauxhall-badged version with right-hand drive was introduced in March 1997.

ABS was standard as well as dual front airbags, dual front side airbags, and seat belt tensioners. The hood was made of aluminium in order to save weight and increase the crumple zone for safety. It had the largest interior of all the MPVs in the European market, including those from Daimler Chrysler.

The Sintra did not use the LA1 3400 V6 engine like the rest of the U body minivans, but rather a selection of Opel engines (which had to be imported to the United States for assembly). New for this generation were cabin air filters, which can be easily accessed from inside the glove compartment.

The Sintra had an important influence on U body development, because GM wanted to keep it similar in dimensions to European large MPVs (such as the Volkswagen Sharan, Ford Galaxy, SEAT Alhambra, Renault Espace, or the Eurovans). As such, the platform was made quite narrow, which in turn made the GMX110s narrower than the previous "dustbuster" minivans, and more importantly than most American competitors. This influence continued through the third and final generation U body minivans, even though none of them were sold in Europe.

The Sintra featured sliding rear side doors on both sides and was available in different seating configurations, which provided seating for from 5 to 8 passengers.

Unlike its counterparts sold in North America, it offered a manual transmission instead of an automatic transmission, and had the gear shift mounted directly on the floor like the older generations of European MPVs.

Many reviewers and customers found that the materials, fit and finish were below the usual Opel quality, and also below what European competitors offered – this was only partially addressed by several changes made throughout the model lifetime, like replacing the upholstery fabric for the season of 1997.

== Reliability ==
This model proved relatively unreliable.

In both May 2000 and May 2001, by which time it had been withdrawn from sale, the Sintra was ranked as the least satisfying car to own in the J.D. Power "customer satisfaction survey", covering cars first registered in the United Kingdom, and publishing in the Top Gear Magazine.

== Safety ==
The Euro NCAP frontal impact crash test performed on a model from 1998 revealed significant deficiencies – the cabin structure proved unstable and the steering wheel (along with the airbag) broke off (unlike the Insurance Institute for Highway Safety (IIHS) test of its North American twin, the 1997 Pontiac Trans Sport, where the steering wheel only moved upward), which might have caused fatal neck injury to the driver, and that the damage to the dummy's feet were extremely high.

Despite relatively good performance in side impact tests, the Sintra only managed to score 2.5 stars (3 stars with one struck due to the fatal neck injury hazard).

== Discontinuation ==
The reliability and safety issues of the Sintra caused the minivan’s popularity to plummet even further, forcing Opel/Vauxhall to drop the model in April 1999. As the Astra-based Opel Zafira compact MPV debuted at the same time the minivan was officially withdrawn from sale, it is sometimes said that the Zafira replaced the Sintra. The Zafira was a smaller vehicle than the Sintra, but it proved to be far more successful than the Sintra ever had been.

Opel never had a large MPV after the Sintra (until the launch of the Zafira Tourer in September 2011). The Chevrolet Trans Sport (which was a rebadged Pontiac Trans Sport very similar to the Sintra) was sold alongside the Sintra and remained available in Europe through 2003 to 2005, depending on the country. The European-market Trans Sport was only offered with the long wheelbase and the 3.4-litre V6 engine.

== Engines ==
- 2.2 L I4 16V DOHC (X22XE)
- 3.0 L V6 24V DOHC L81 V6 (X30XE)
- 2.2 L DTi-4 16V Diesel (X22DTH): available during its last year of production (1999) with only 1,394 built.
