= Pontiac Grand Prix =

Automobile model made by Pontiac

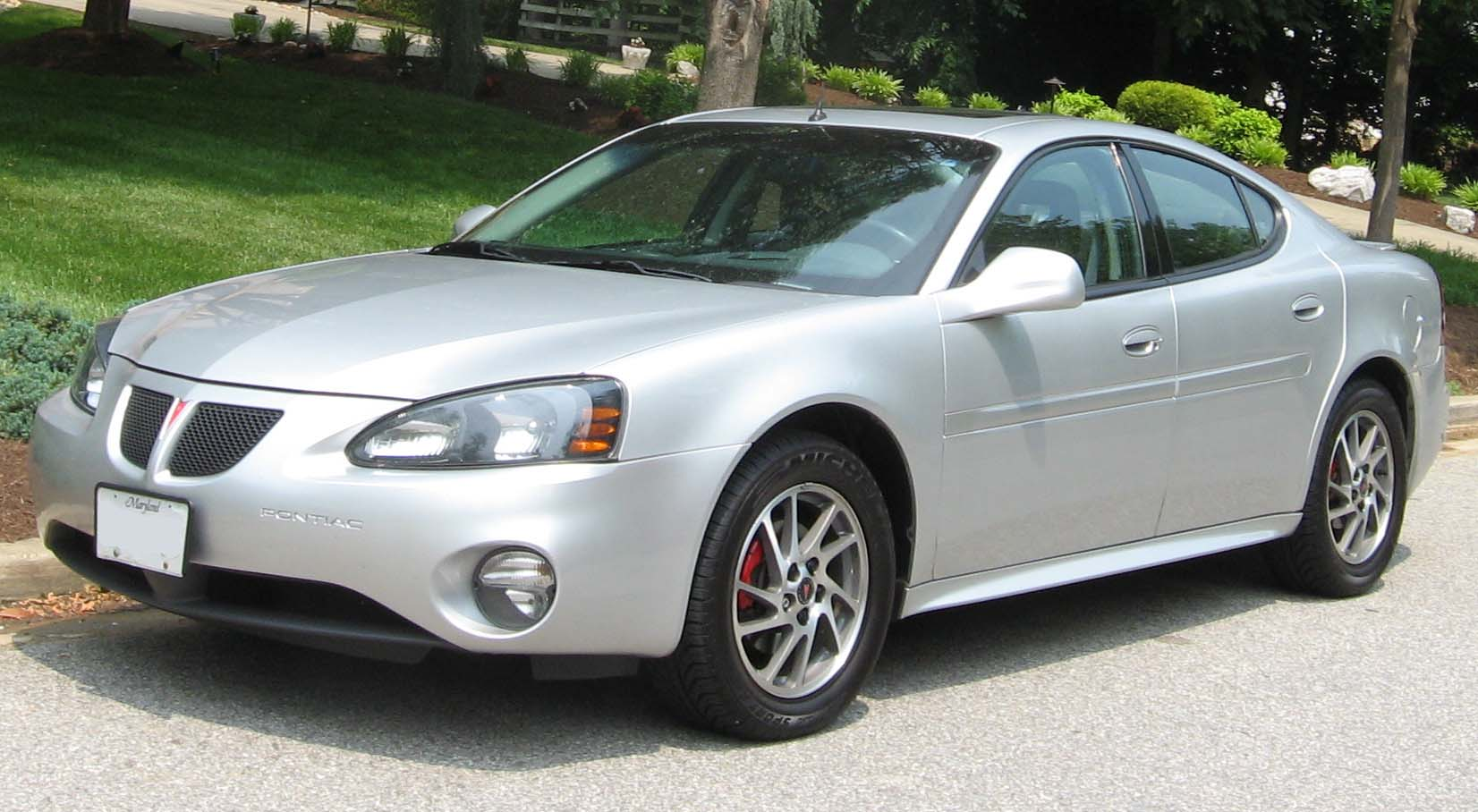
- 2004–2008 Pontiac Grand Prix

Overview
- Manufacturer: Pontiac (General Motors)
- Model years: 1962–2008

Body and chassis
- Class: Personal luxury car (1962–1987); Mid-size car (1988–2008)
- Layout: Front-engine, rear-wheel-drive (1962–1987); Transverse front-engine, front-wheel drive (1988–2008)
- Platform: B (1962–68); A (1973–81); G (1969–72, 1982–87); W (1988–2008)

Chronology
- Successor: Pontiac G8 (sedan); Pontiac GTO (coupe)

The Grand Prix is a line of automobiles produced by the Pontiac Division of General Motors from 1962 until 2002 as coupes and from 1989 through 2008 model years as four-door sedans.

First introduced as a full-size performance coupe for the 1962 model year, the model repeatedly varied in size, luxury, and performance over successive generations. The Grand Prix was the most expensive coupe Pontiac offered until the 1970s, when the Bonneville Brougham and the Firebird Trans Am became more exclusive; the Grand Prix moved into the intermediate personal luxury car and later the mid-size market segments.

All Grand Prixes from 1962 through 1972 were pillarless hardtops (except for the 1967 convertible).

== First generation (1962–1964) ==
First generation
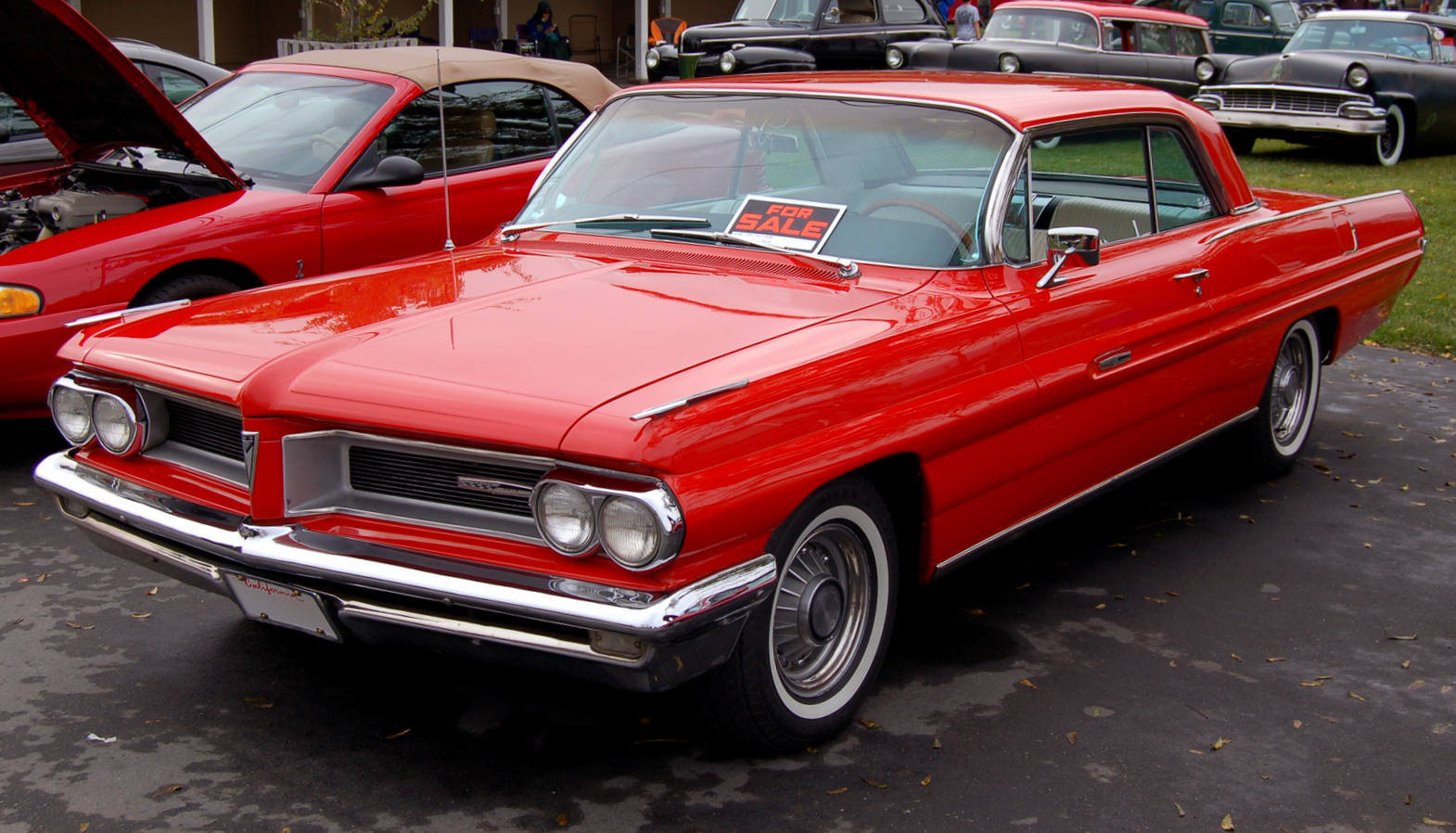
- 1962 Pontiac Grand Prix

Overview
- Production: 1962–1964
- Model years: 1962–1964
- Assembly: Pontiac Assembly, Pontiac, Michigan; Arlington Assembly, Arlington, Texas; Fairfax Assembly, Kansas City, Kansas; Linden Assembly, Linden, New Jersey; South Gate Assembly, South Gate, California

Body and chassis
- Class: Full-size; Personal luxury car
- Body style: 2-door hardtop
- Layout: FR layout
- Platform: B-body
- Related: Buick Invicta; Oldsmobile Starfire; Chevrolet Impala SS

Powertrain
- Engine: 389 cu in (6.4 L) Pontiac V8
- Transmission: 3-speed manual 4-speed manual 3-speed Hydra-Matic automatic

Dimensions
- Wheelbase: 120 in (3,048 mm)
- Length: 211.6 in (5,375 mm); 211.9 in (5,382 mm): 1963
- Width: 78.6 in (1,996 mm)

Chronology
- Predecessor: Pontiac Ventura

The Grand Prix was an all-new model for Pontiac in the 1962 model year as a performance-oriented personal luxury car. Based on the Pontiac Catalina two-door hardtop, Pontiac included unique interior trim with bucket seats and a center console in the front to make the new model a lower-priced entry in the growing personal-luxury segment. The Grand Prix was available with luxury features from the longer, top-line Bonneville coupe. The bucket seats were upholstered in "Morrokide" vinyl, while nylon loop-blend carpeting covered the floor and lower door panels. It was also installed with a center console with a transmission shifter, tachometer, four-barrel carburetor, dual exhausts, and "acceleration" rear axle ratio (3.42:1). It used the Catalina coupe platform with minimal outside chrome trim, and included the 303 hp (226 kW) "Trophy" version of 389 cu in (6.4 L) V8 engine with a three-speed manual transmission or optional console-mounted four-speed manual or Hydra-Matic automatic.

The Grand Prix featured distinctive grille and taillights. It effectively replaced the Pontiac Ventura model while the Catalina was available with an optional "Ventura" trim package for 1962. The rear bench seat included a center fold-down armrest and a speaker grille that could be made functional with the extra-cost Bi-Phonic rear speaker. Included were a padded instrument panel, deluxe steering wheel, courtesy lights, and other features. The listed retail price before optional equipment was $3,490 ($37,146 in 2025 dollars) and was the most expensive model when it was introduced.

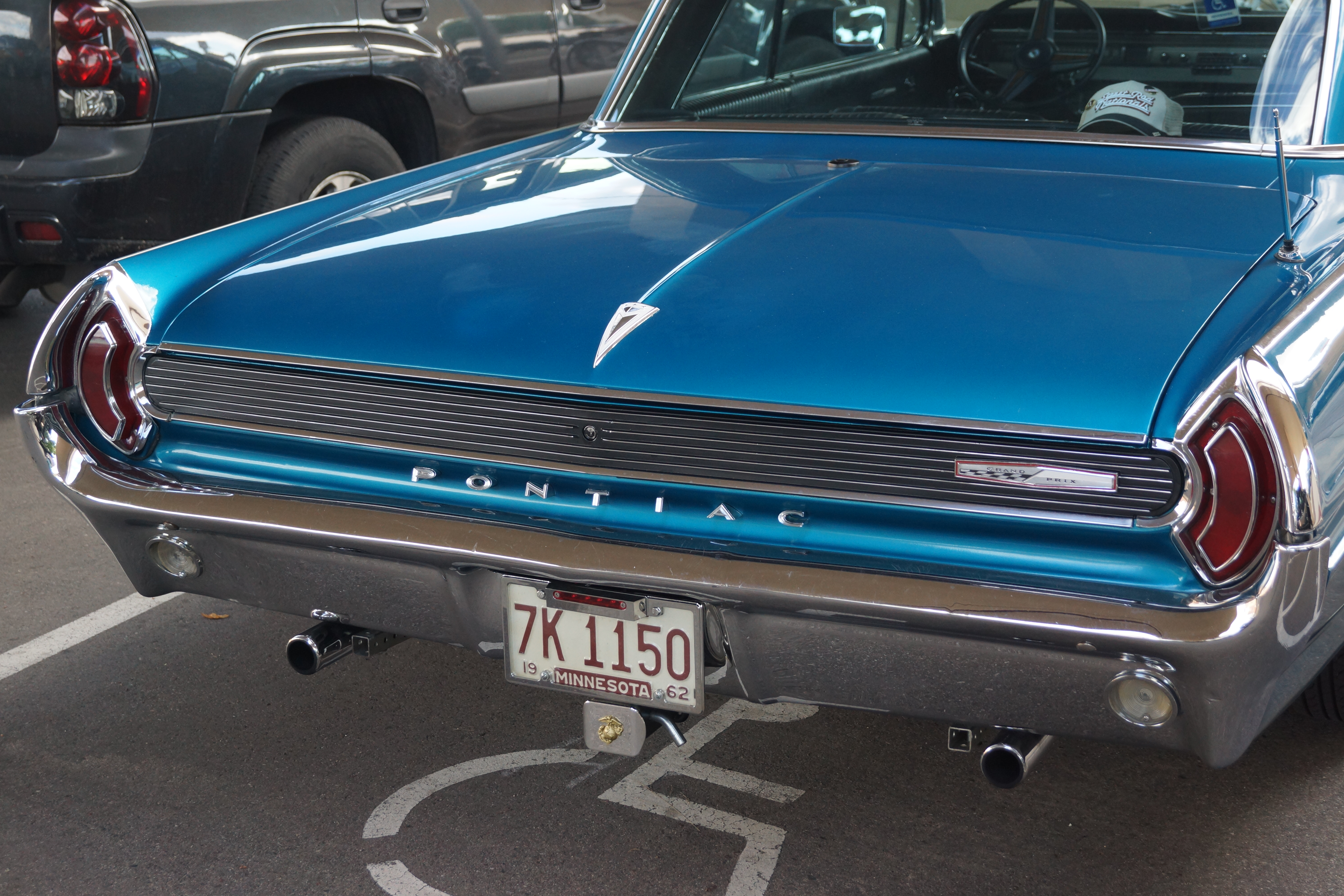
taillights of 1962 Grand Prix

The standard engine was the Bonneville's 303 hp (226 kW) 389 cu in (6.4 L) V8, which came with four-barrel carburetor and dual exhausts. Tri-Power carburation (with three two-barrels) raised output to 318 hp (237 kW). Two other high-performance 389s were offered, including a four-barrel version rated at 333 hp (248 kW) and a 348 hp (260 kW) Tri-Power. Late in the model year a "street" version of the race-orientated 421 Pontiac offered in 1961 and 1962 became available, but only in a four-barrel form rated at 320 hp (240 kW). Pontiac also offered the 421 cu in (7 L) Super Duty with two four-barrel carburetors, rated at 405 hp (302 kW), as a US$2,250 option ($23,948 in 2025 dollars).

John DeLorean, head of Advanced Engineering at Pontiac, contributed to the development of the Grand Prix as well as the GTO.

=== 1963 ===
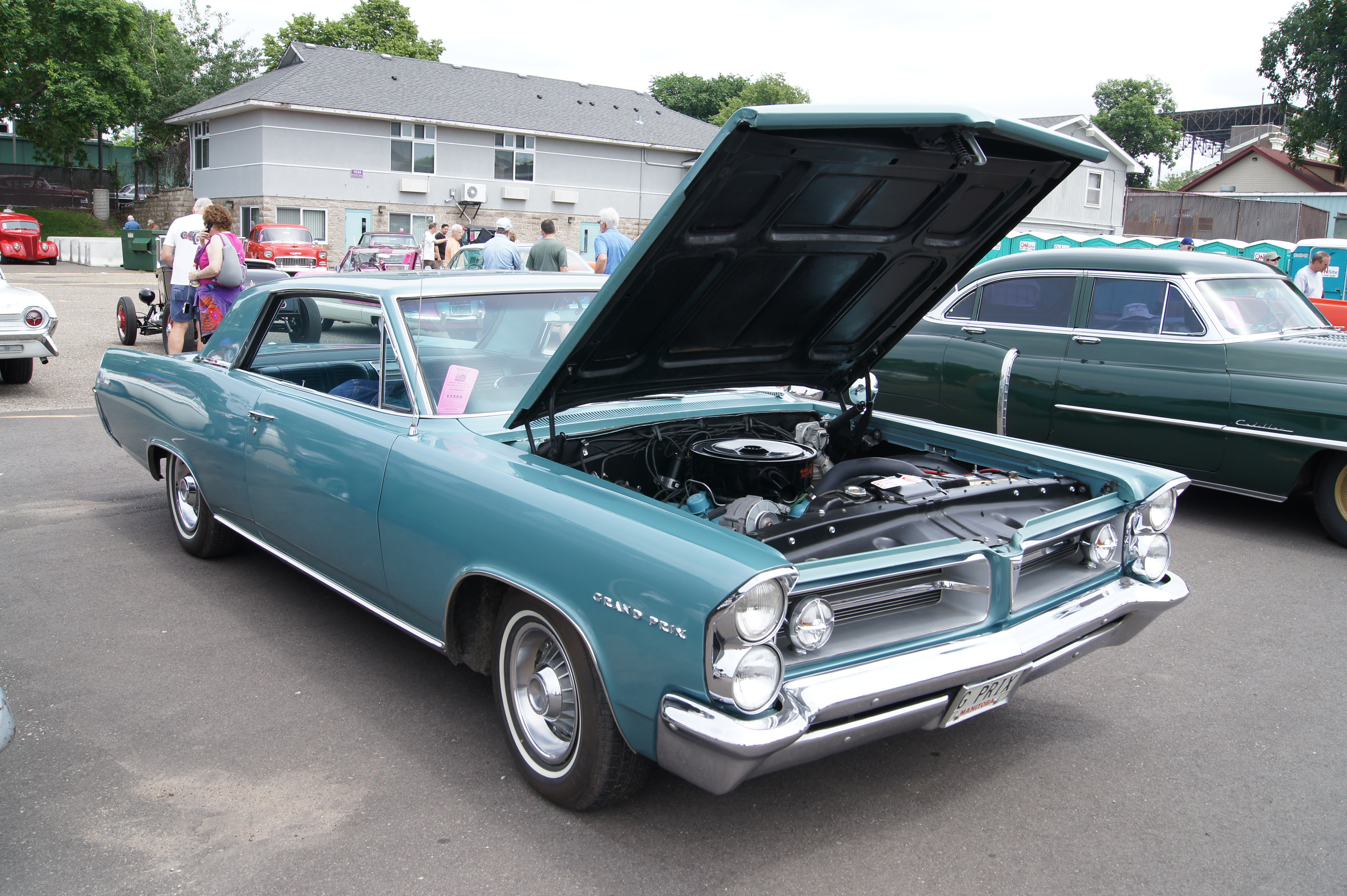
1963 Pontiac Grand Prix Sports Coupe

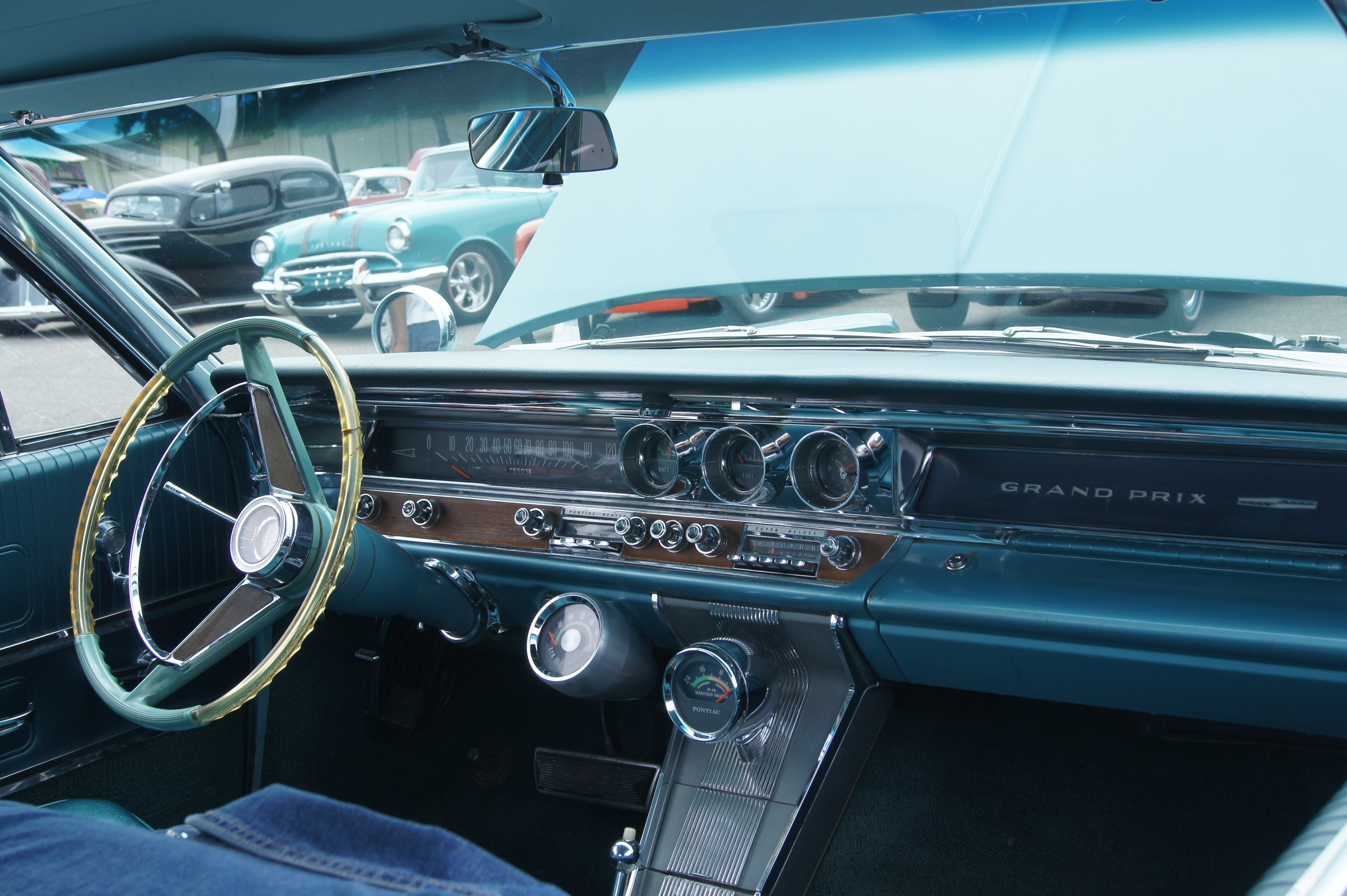
1963 Pontiac Grand Prix Sports Coupe interior

For the 1963 model year, the Grand Prix received revised sheet metal shared with other full-size Pontiacs, but with a squared-off roofline featuring a concave rear window that contrasted with the convertible-like roof styling of the previous year. New was a split grille with vertically stacked headlights and round parking lights as well as "hidden" taillights. Aside from grille work, taillight covering, and bumpers, chrome trim was limited to lower rocker panels, wheel arches, and roofline.

The Grand Prix continued with luxurious interiors featuring real walnut trim on the instrument panel and bucket seats upholstered in "Morrokide" vinyl. The center console was now built into the instrument panel and featured an intake manifold pressure vacuum gauge along with a dash-mounted tachometer for cars with manual transmission. Pedals received revised custom trim plates. Options included power steering, brakes, windows, and driver's seat; air conditioning, eight-lug aluminum wheels with integrated brake drums, and Safe-T-Track differential. New options for this year included an AM/FM radio, cruise control, and a tilt steering wheel adjustable to seven positions.

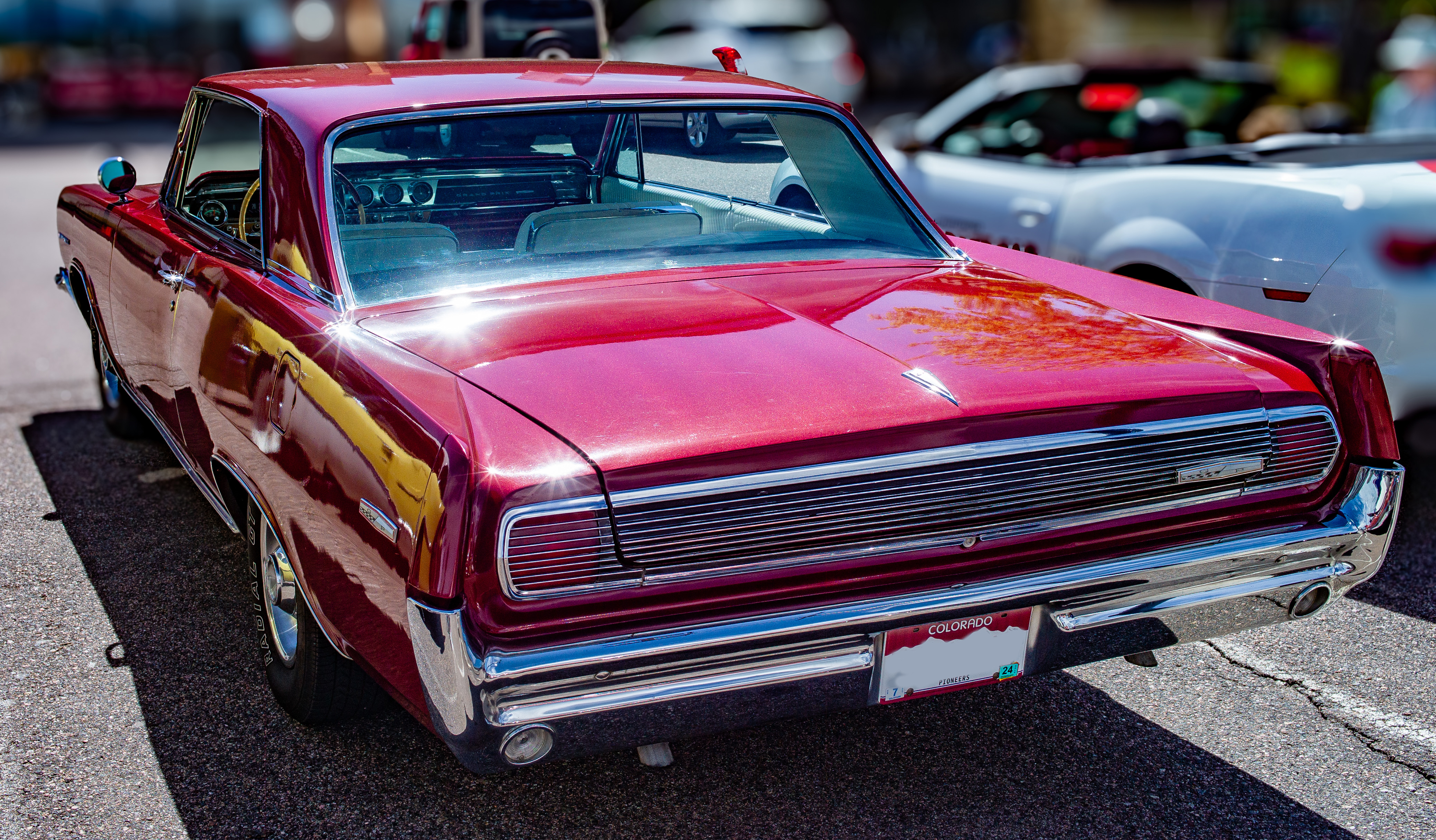
1963 Pontiac Grand Prix in Marimba Red Metallic

The 303 hp (226 kW) 389 four-barrel V8 remained the standard engine. A new lineup of optional engines was introduced this year which included the 330 hp (250 kW) 389 Tri-Power and three versions of the 421 cu in (7 L) V8 including a four-barrel version rated at 320 hp (240 kW), a 350 hp (260 kW) Tri-Power option, and the 421 HO option with Tri-Power carburetion and 370 hp (280 kW). The same selection of transmissions continued including the standard three-speed manual, optional four-speed manual, or three-speed Roto Hydra-matic. Brakes were 11 in (28 cm) drums.

=== 1964 ===
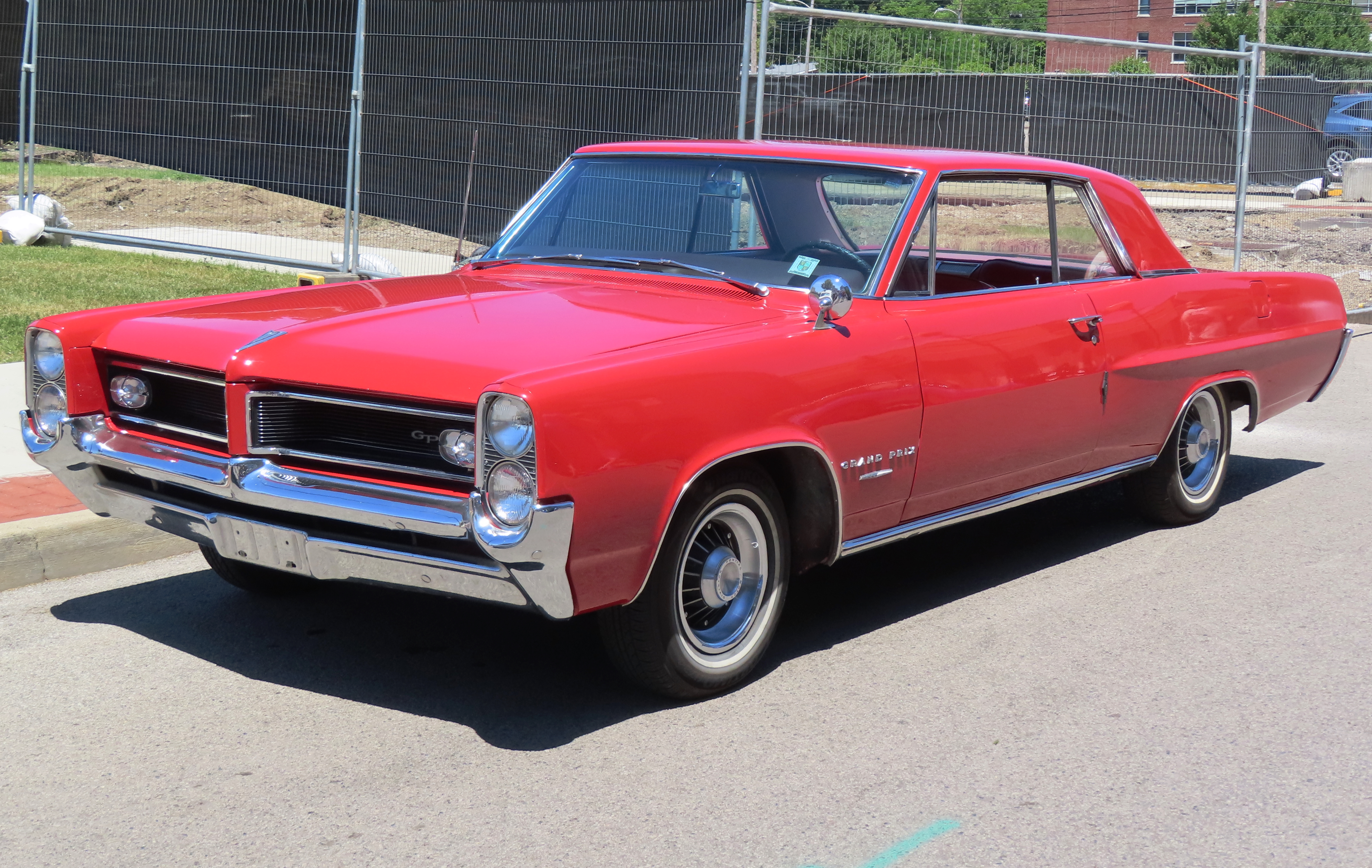
1964 Pontiac Grand Prix

The 1964 Grand Prix received minor appearance changes. Those included a revised grille (based on the 1964 Bonneville/Catalina) with new "GP" logos and rear deck trim with new taillights, still hidden, again following the design of the other big 1964 Pontiacs.

Revised upholstery trims highlighted the interior, still featuring expanded "Morrokide" vinyl bucket seats and console as standard equipment.

Engine offerings were mostly unchanged from 1963 except that the standard 303 hp (226 kW) 389 four-barrel V8 gained 3 hp (2.2 kW), with the extra-cost Hydramatic transmission. The standard three-speed manual and optional Hydramatic transmissions were unchanged from 1963, however, a new GM-built Muncie four-speed available in either a wide-ratio M-20 or close-ratio M-21 options replaced the Borg-Warner T-10.

Pontiac Grand Prix Production Figures
	Yearly Total
1962	30,195
1963	72,959
1964	63,810
Total	166,964

== Second generation (1965–1968) ==
Second generation
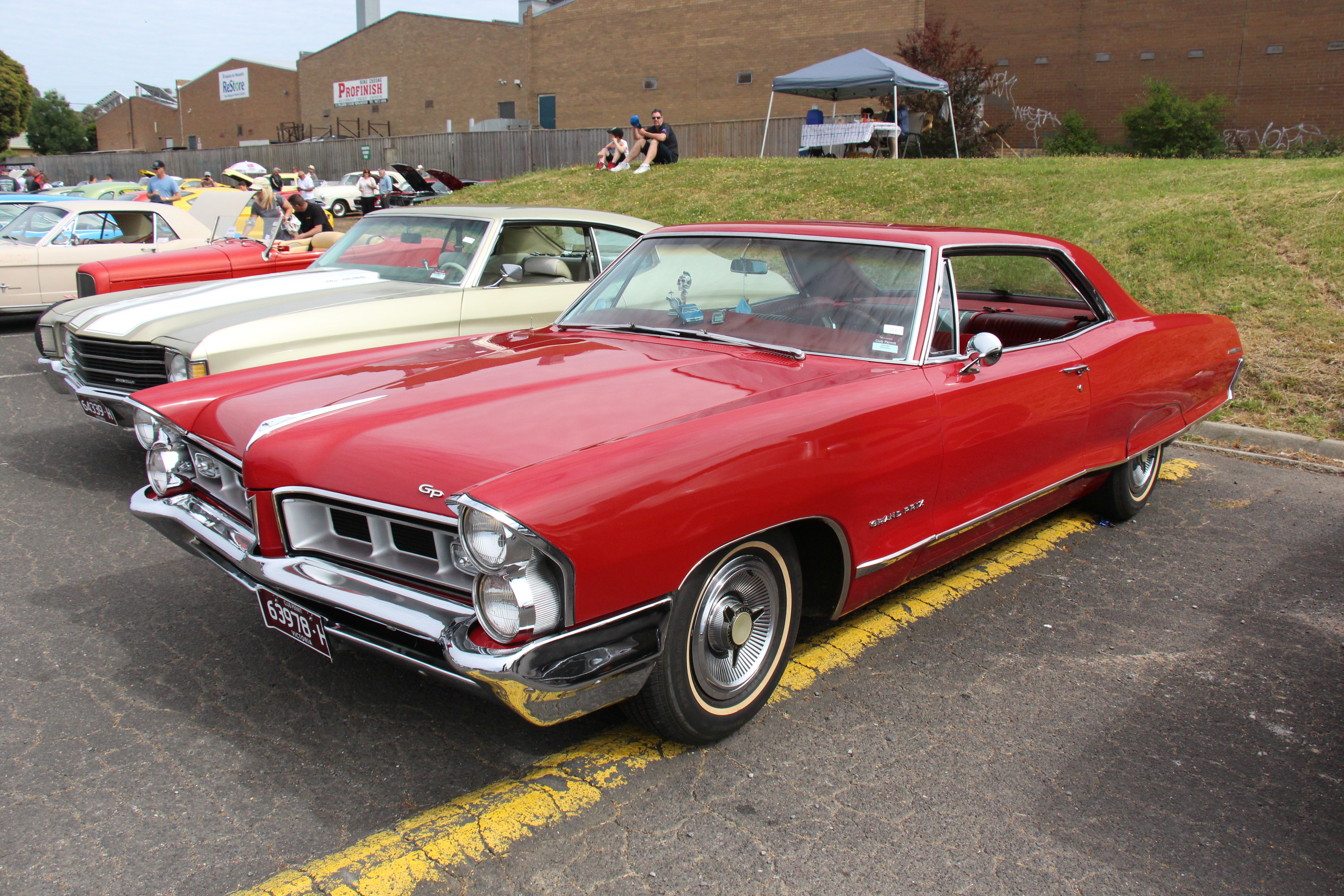
- 1965 Pontiac Grand Prix hardtop

Overview
- Model years: 1965–1968
- Assembly: Pontiac Assembly, Pontiac, Michigan; Arlington Assembly, Arlington, Texas; Fairfax Assembly, Kansas City, Kansas; Linden Assembly, Linden, New Jersey; South Gate Assembly, South Gate, California

Body and chassis
- Class: Full-size; Personal luxury car
- Body style: 2-door hardtop 2-door convertible (1967 only)
- Layout: FR layout
- Platform: B-body
- Related: Buick Wildcat; Oldsmobile Starfire; Chevrolet Impala SS

Powertrain
- Engine: 389 cu in (6.4 L) Pontiac V8; 421 cu in (6.9 L) Pontiac V8; 400 cu in (6.6 L) Pontiac V8; 428 cu in (7.0 L) Pontiac V8; 455 cu in (7.5 L) Pontiac V8
- Transmission: 3-speed synchromesh manual 4-speed synchromesh manual 3 Speed Turbo-Hydramatic 400 Automatic

Dimensions
- Wheelbase: 121 in (3,073 mm)
- Length: 214.6 in (5,451 mm)
- Curb weight: 4,282 lb (1,942 kg)

=== 1965 ===
Grand Prix and all other full-sized Pontiacs were completely restyled for 1965 featuring more rounded bodylines with coke-bottle profiles, and a 1 in (25 mm) increase in wheelbase to 121 in (3,073 mm) (for Grand Prix, Catalina, and all Safari station wagons — Bonneville and Star Chief increased proportionally from 123 in (3,124 mm) to 124 in (3,150 mm)). While other Pontiac coupes received the semi-fastback rooflines shared with other GM divisions, Grand Prixes retained the exclusive squared-off roofline with concave rear window but a bit more rounded than the 1963 and 1964 version. This generation also introduced fender skirts over the rear wheels for an upscale look, shared with Cadillac, Buick and Oldsmobile senior models.

Interiors were revised with new instrument panels featuring more walnut trim which now extended to the center console standard with bucket seats, along with a new steering wheel with horn bars replacing the horn ring used in previous years. The standard bucket seats could be upholstered either in expanded "Morrokide" vinyl or new cloth-and-"Morrokide" trim. New for 1965 was a no-cost bench seat option with a center armrest available with either upholstery choice. The Grand Prix retained the market position as the most expensive model, offering all equipment offered on the Bonneville hardtop coupe as standard equipment, and had a listed retail price of $3,426 ($35,002 in 2025 dollars).

New options included an automatic air conditioning system called "Comfort Control". This system, first introduced by Cadillac in 1964, was available in addition to the regular Circ-L-Aire Conditioning. Hazard flashers and seat belts were also optional.

Engine offerings were revised for 1965. The standard four-barrel 389 cu in (6.4 L) V8 was uprated to 333 hp (248 kW) with a manual transmission or 325 hp (242 kW) with automatic. Optional engines included a 389 Tri-Power and 421 four-barrel — both rated at 338 hp (252 kW); a 421 Tri-Power rated at 350 hp (261 kW) and the 421 HO Tri-Power with 376 hp (280 kW). The standard three-speed and optional four-speed manual transmissions were carried over from 1964, however, a new three-speed Turbo Hydramatic transmission with torque-converter that was similar in principle to Ford's Cruise-O-Matic and Chrysler's TorqueFlite replaced the older three-speed fluid coupling Roto Hydramatic (along with the four-speed Super Hydramatic in Bonneville and Star Chief models). The Turbo Hydramatic also featured the now-standardized P-R-N-D-S-L shift quadrant pattern in place of the P-N-D-S-L-R setup of previous Hydramatics.

A 1965 Grand Prix road test was featured in the February 1965 issue of Motor Trend magazine, which was focused on the entire Pontiac lineup receiving M/T "Car of the Year" honors for 1965. Other Pontiac road tests in that issue included a GTO convertible, Tempest Custom sedan, Catalina Vista hardtop sedan, and Bonneville hardtop coupe.

=== 1966 ===
The 1966 Grand Prix received only minor appearance revisions including a new more rounded split grille and new taillight trim. Inside, a revised instrument panel included a squared-off gauge panel and new Strato bucket seats in either "Morrokide" or cloth upholstery with higher seatbacks and more contoured cushions for improved lateral support. The Strato buckets were standard equipment along with a console, but a notchback bench seat with a center armrest was a no-cost option.

Engine offerings were largely unchanged from 1965 except that the 338 hp (252 kW) Tri-Power 389 option was discontinued, leaving only the larger 421 available with the three two-barrel carb option, which was offered for the last time this year due to a new General Motors edict that banned the use of multi-carb options on all GM cars with the exception of the Chevrolet Corvette starting with the 1967 model year.

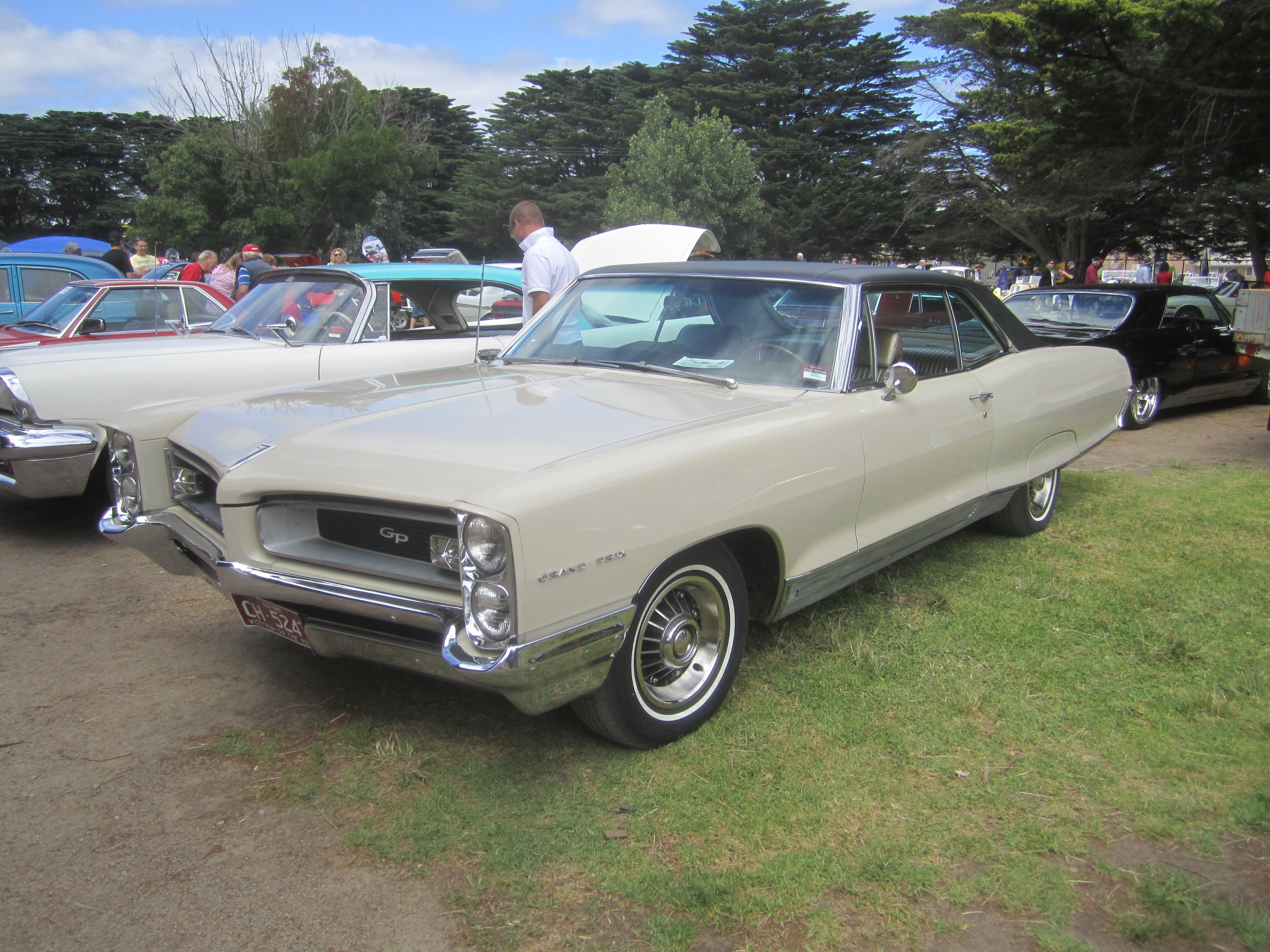
1966 Pontiac Grand Prix Hardtop Coupe

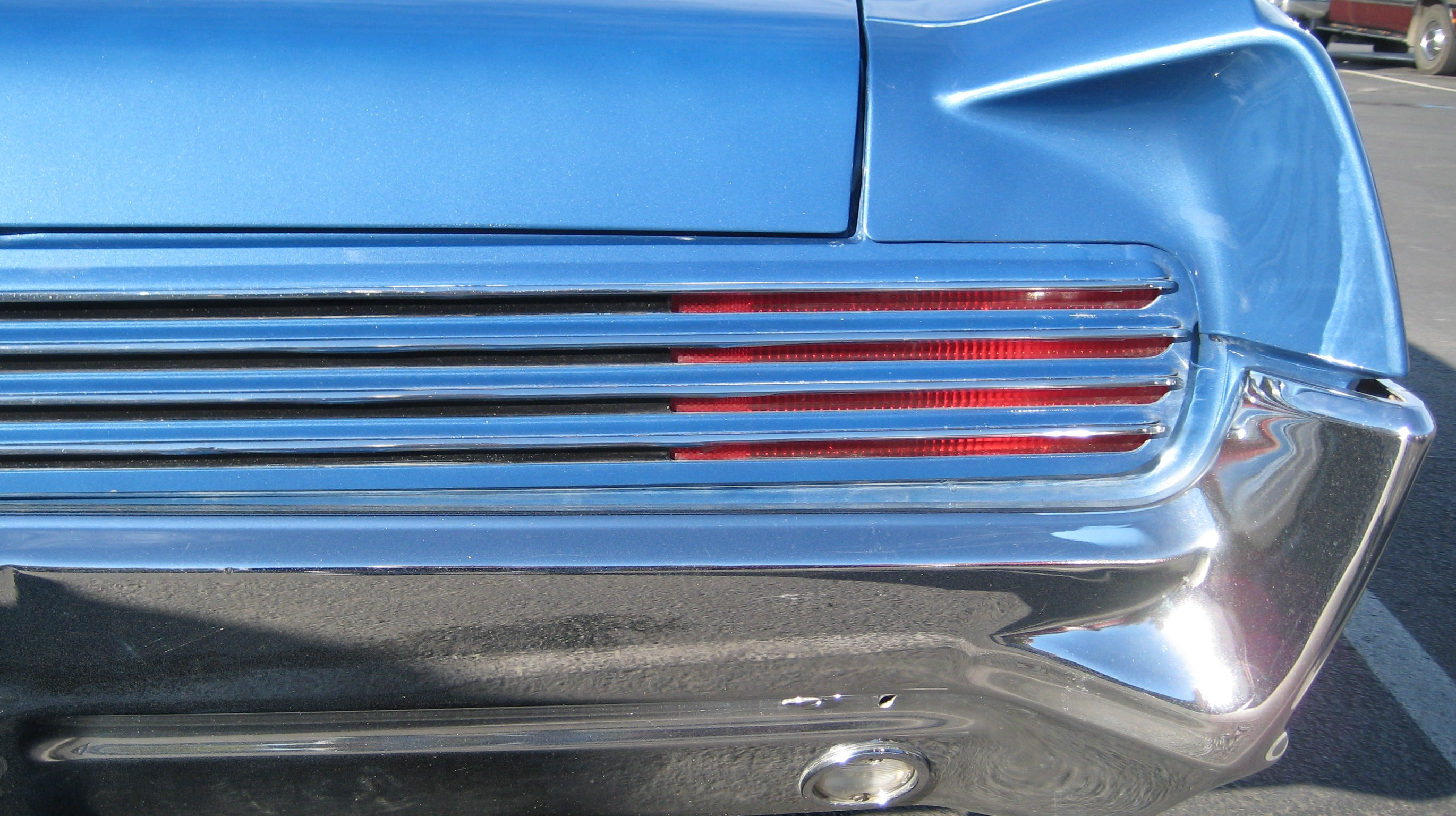
1966 Pontiac Grand Prix taillights

=== 1967 ===
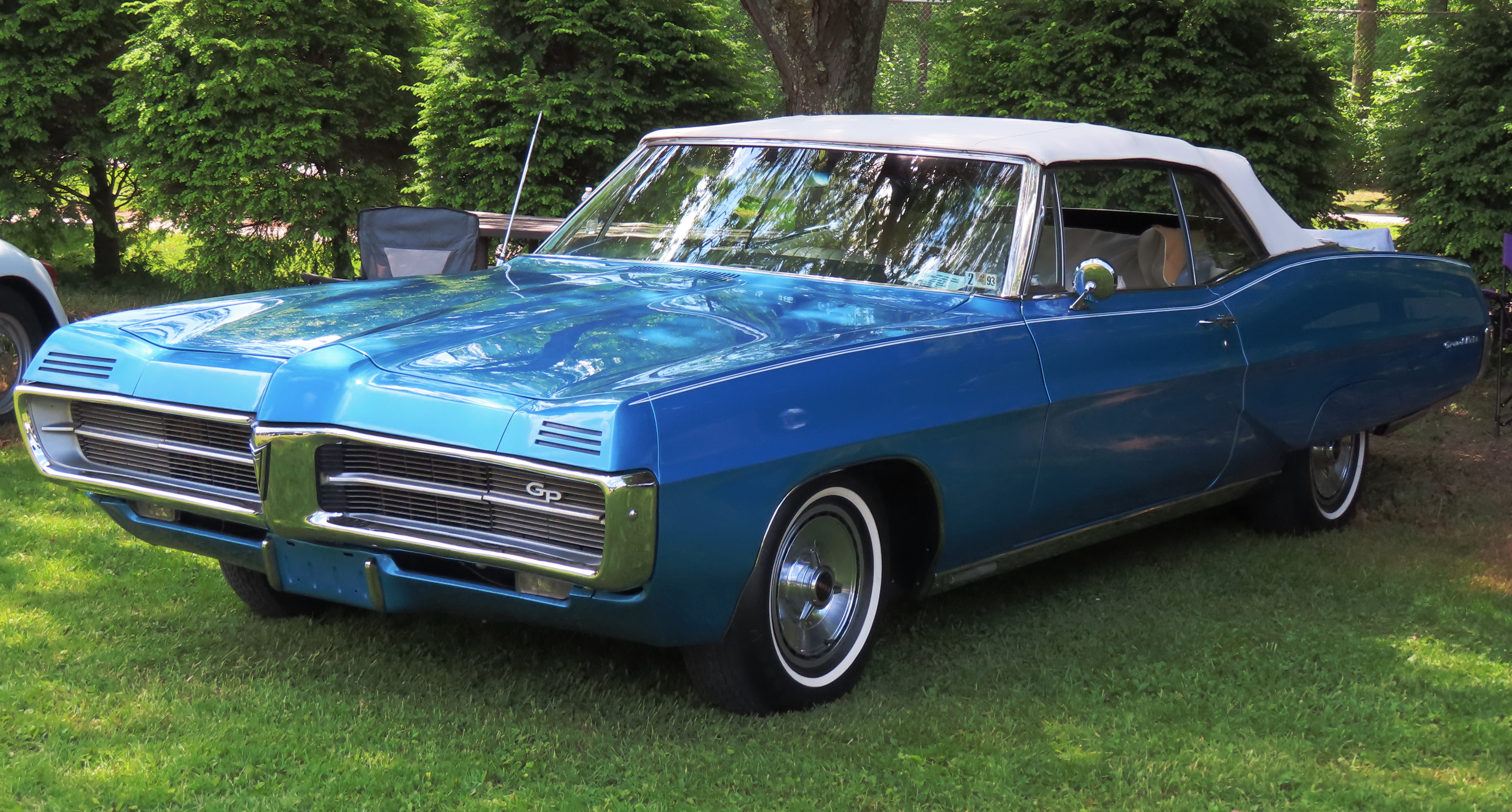
1967 Pontiac Grand Prix Convertible

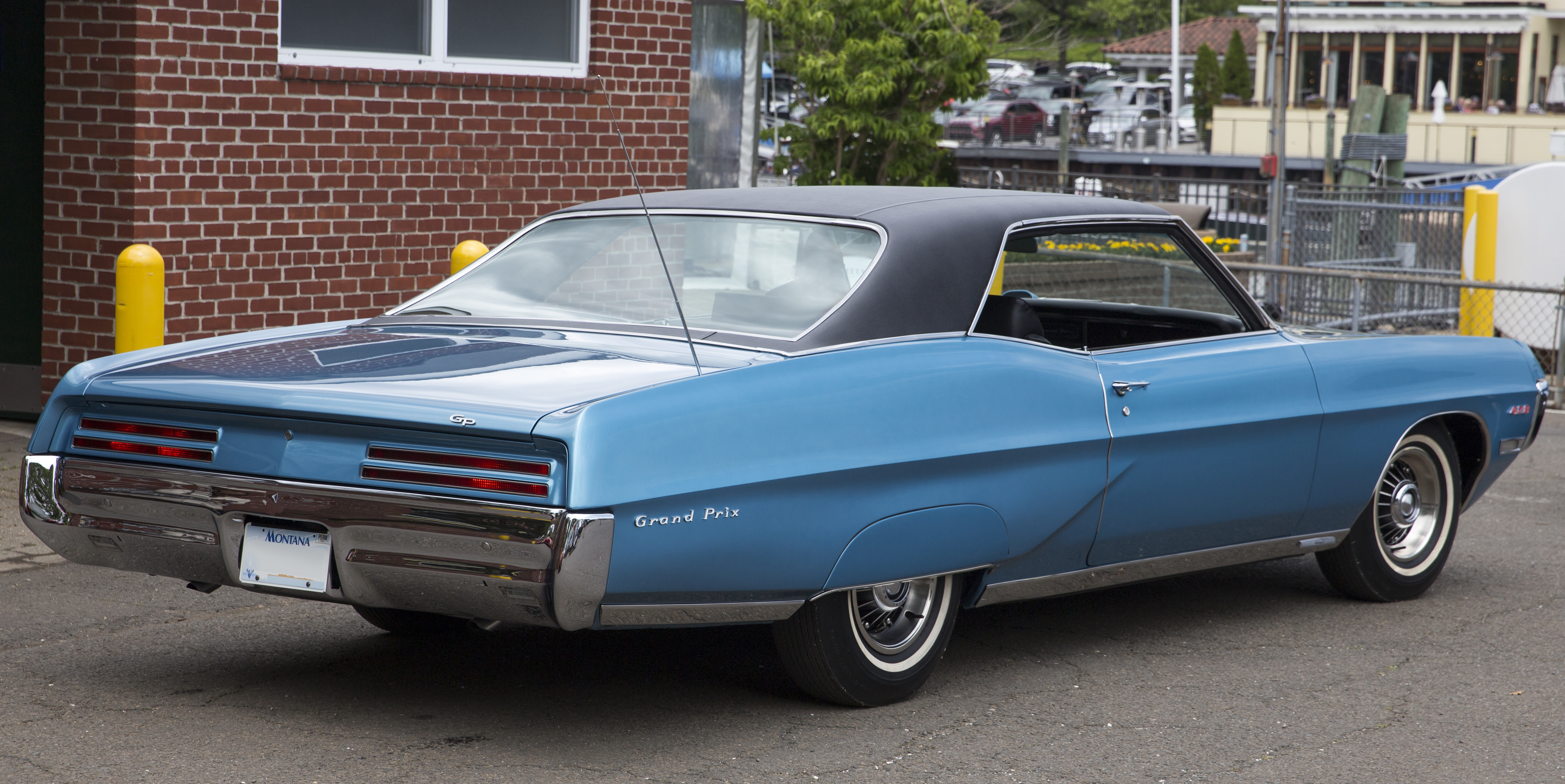
1967 Pontiac Grand Prix, rear view

Revised sheet metal with rounded yet even more pronounced Coke bottle styling highlighted the 1967 Grand Prix and other full-sized Pontiacs. A convertible was new; this lasted only for the 1967 model year. Also new to the G.P.-concealed headlights with horizontal mounting (all other full-size 1967 Pontiacs retained the vertical headlights for one more year), concealed windshield wipers, and ventless front windows on hardtop coupes. The louvered taillights were similar to those found on the GTO.

"Strato" bucket seats and console were standard equipment with "Morrokide" vinyl or cloth upholstery, or a no-cost optional notchback bench seat with either trims. Other changes included a revised instrument panel and door panel trim.

The 389 V8 was replaced by a new 400 cu in (6.6 L) V8 with four-barrel carburetor, dual exhausts and 350 hp (261 kW). Similarly, the 421 V8 was replaced by a new 428 cu in (7.0 L) V8 rated at 360 hp (268 kW) or an HO version with 376 hp (280 kW) - both with four-barrel carburetors. Both the 400 and 428 V8s were basically bored out versions of the older 389/421 block but with various internal improvements including bigger valves and improved breathing capabilities.

New this year was a dual master-cylinder braking system and optional front disc brakes along with Rally II wheels. Also new for 1967 was an energy-absorbing collapsible steering column. Plus, Pontiac added an 8-track Stereo tape player.

=== 1968 ===
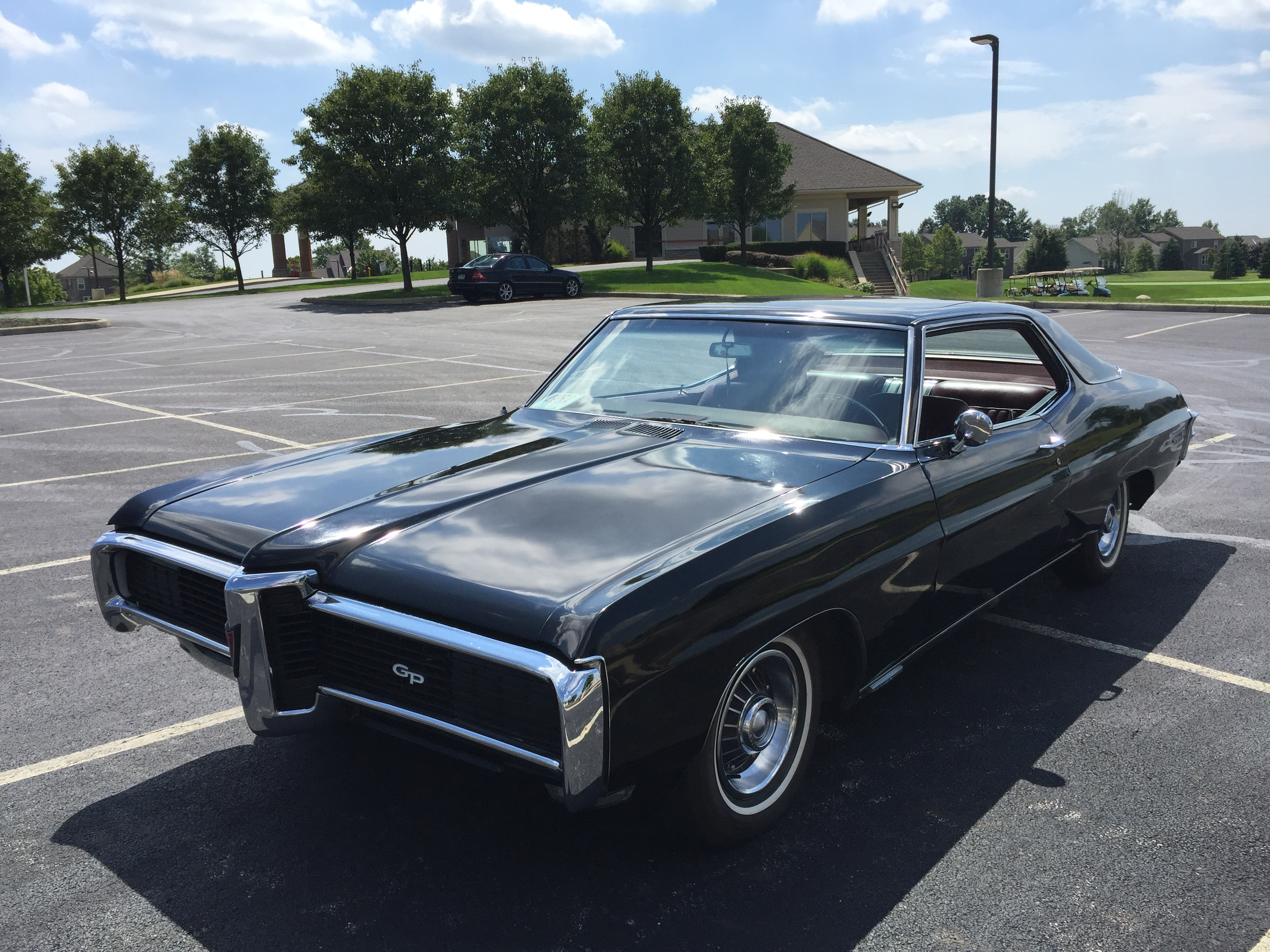
1968 Pontiac Grand Prix Hardtop Coupe

The 1968 Grand Prix received a more pronounced "beak-nose" grille in shock-absorbent plastic and a new front bumper. The concealed headlights were carried over, and a revised rear deck/bumper with L-shaped taillights and side reflector markers to meet a new federal safety mandate were new. The convertible was discontinued, leaving only the hardtop coupe for 1968.

The standard 350 hp (261 kW) 400 cu in (6.6 L) V8 was revised to meet the new 1968 Federal and California emission regulations. Both optional 428 cu in (7.0 L) V8s received higher power ratings of 375 hp (280 kW) for the base version and 390 hp (291 kW) for the HO.

The interior trim only received minor changes from 1967 aside from revised door panels.

This would be the final year for the B-bodied, full-sized Grand Prix. The 1969 Grand Prix would feature a new body using a chassis based on the shorter Pontiac A-body intermediates.

Pontiac Grand Prix Production Figures
	Yearly Total
1965	57,881
1966	36,757
1967	42,981
1968	31,177
Total	168,796

== Third generation (1969–1972) ==
Third generation
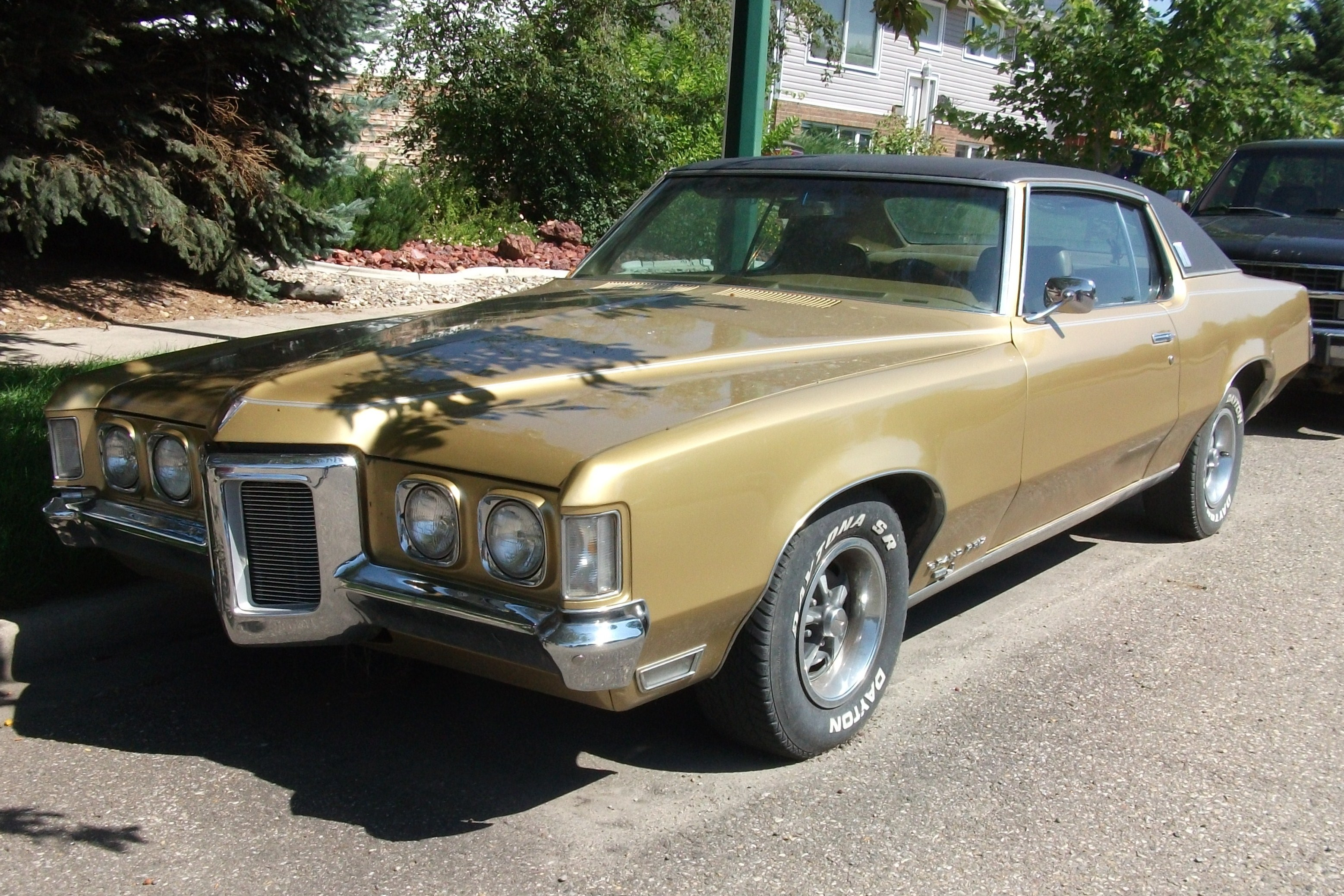
- 1969 Pontiac Grand Prix with SJ option pack

Overview
- Production: 1968–1972
- Model years: 1969–1972
- Assembly: Pontiac Assembly, Pontiac, Michigan; Lakewood Assembly, Lakewood Heights, Georgia

Body and chassis
- Class: Mid-size; Personal luxury car
- Body style: 2-door hardtop
- Layout: FR layout
- Platform: G-body
- Related: Chevrolet Monte Carlo

Powertrain
- Engine: 400 cu in (6.6 L) Pontiac V8; 428 cu in (7.0 L) Pontiac V8; 455 cu in (7.5 L) Pontiac V8
- Transmission: 3-speed synchromesh manual 4-speed synchromesh manual 3 Speed Turbo-Hydramatic 400 Automatic

Dimensions
- Wheelbase: 118 in (2,997 mm)
- Length: 210.2 in (5,339 mm): 1970; 213.6 in (5,425 mm): 1972
- Width: 75.7 in (1,923 mm)

For the 1969 model year, Pontiac's general manager John Z. DeLorean ordered the development of an all-new Grand Prix. It featured new bodywork with a pronounced grille, and rode on a stretched version of the intermediate GM A platform and introduced as the G-Body.

=== Development ===
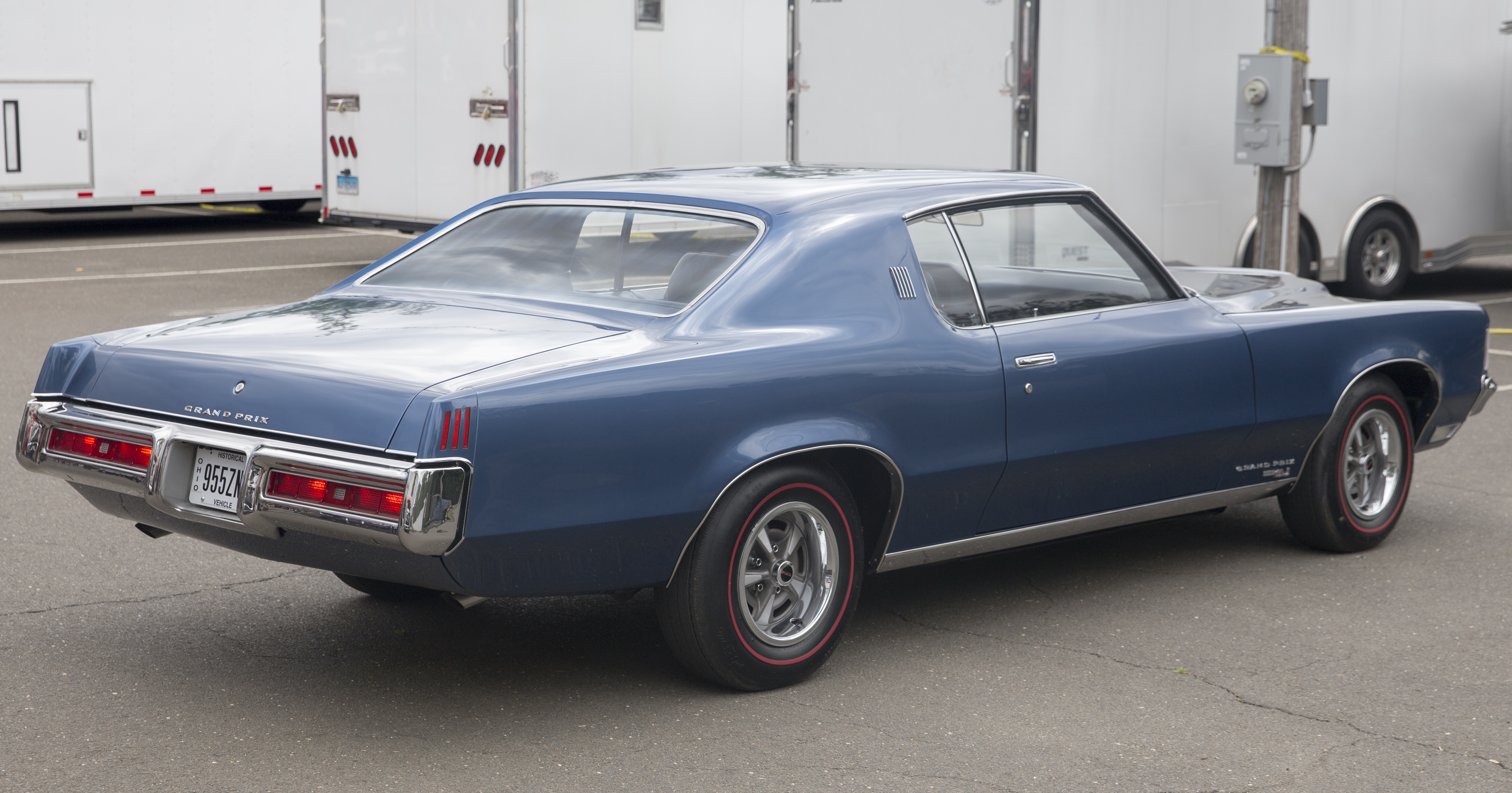
1969 Pontiac Grand Prix with SJ option pack. The rear end was much more subtle than the aggressive front

The new intermediate-based 1969 Grand Prix began to take shape in April 1967, with a few prototype models built on the full-sized Pontiac platform before the G-Body was ready. To save both development costs and time in much the same manner Chevrolet created the original Chevrolet Camaro using the basic chassis and drivetrain from the compact Chevrolet Chevy II, the revised Grand Prix would have a unique bodyshell and ride on the intermediate A-body stretched 6”, and share mechanicals with the Tempest, Le Mans and GTO. This reduced development time from the usual 36 months required for a new model to less than 18 , allowing Pontiac to concentrate on upgrading styling and interior appointments.

Shortened by three inches from the previous Catalina wheelbase, the 118 in (2,997 mm) 1969 Grand Prix finally had a unique body – and Pontiac's longest-ever hood. Like all but the short-lived 1967 convertible, the new Grand Prix was a 2-door hardtop. Model names borrowed suggestive Duesenberg Model SJ nomenclature for the exclusive "SJ" trim package and the prominent grille. The basic 1969 body shell saw a major facelift in 1971 bracketed by minor detail revisions in the 1970 and 1972 model years.

=== 1969 ===
The new Grand Prix sought to deliver performance as attention-getting as its styling, with manual transmission options and engines topping out at the 390 hp (291 kW) 428 HO.

Two engines were offered with two power options each; a 265 hp (198 kW) or 350 hp (261 kW) 400 cu in (6.6 L), and a 370 hp (276 kW) or 390 hp (291 kW) 428 cu in (7.0 L) V8. The 1969 Grand Prix debuted a "Command Seat" wraparound cockpit-style instrument panel that placed most controls and gauges within easy reach of the driver.

Enhancing the interior's sporty look, the "Strato" bucket seats were separated by a console integrated into the instrument panel that slanted toward the driver, which included a floor shifter, storage compartment, and ashtray. A leather trim option which also replaced nylon loop rug with cut-pile carpeting was finally offered in addition to the "Morrokide" vinyl and cloth and "Morrokide" upholstery offerings. Innovations in 1969 included a radio antenna embedded in the windshield, flush-mounted "pop-open" exterior door handles, side-impact beams inside the doors, and an optional built-in electrically heated rear window defogger. The listed retail price with the optional "SJ" trim package was $4,182 ($36,716 in 2025 dollars), keeping a higher price over the Bonneville hardtop coupe but was now less expensive than the GTO "Judge" convertible.

Also in 1969, Pontiac built a steam powered SE 101 concept car with a 150 hp (112 kW) engine designed by GM engineering in conjunction with the Besler brothers. The engine, however, was 450 lb (204 kg) heavier than a V8, and three times more expensive to make.

==== Market ====
DeLorean and other Pontiac planners saw a way to reverse the declining sales of the full-sized Grand Prix by creating a new niche in the burgeoning personal luxury car market. Smaller than the E-bodied Cadillac Eldorado, Buick Riviera, and Oldsmobile Toronado, it was positioned with the considerably smaller yet Ford Thunderbird (and above the Mercury Cougar XR-7 Pony car and the B-bodied Dodge Charger intermediate).

Sales reached over 112,000 units, almost quadruple the 32,000 full-sized models built in 1968. The similar but less luxurious Chevrolet Monte Carlo followed in 1970. Ford and Chrysler responded by producing plusher versions of their intermediate Torino and Charger, but both eventually created newer entries to the intermediate personal luxury car battle—the Ford Elite in 1974 and Chrysler Cordoba in 1975.

=== 1970 ===
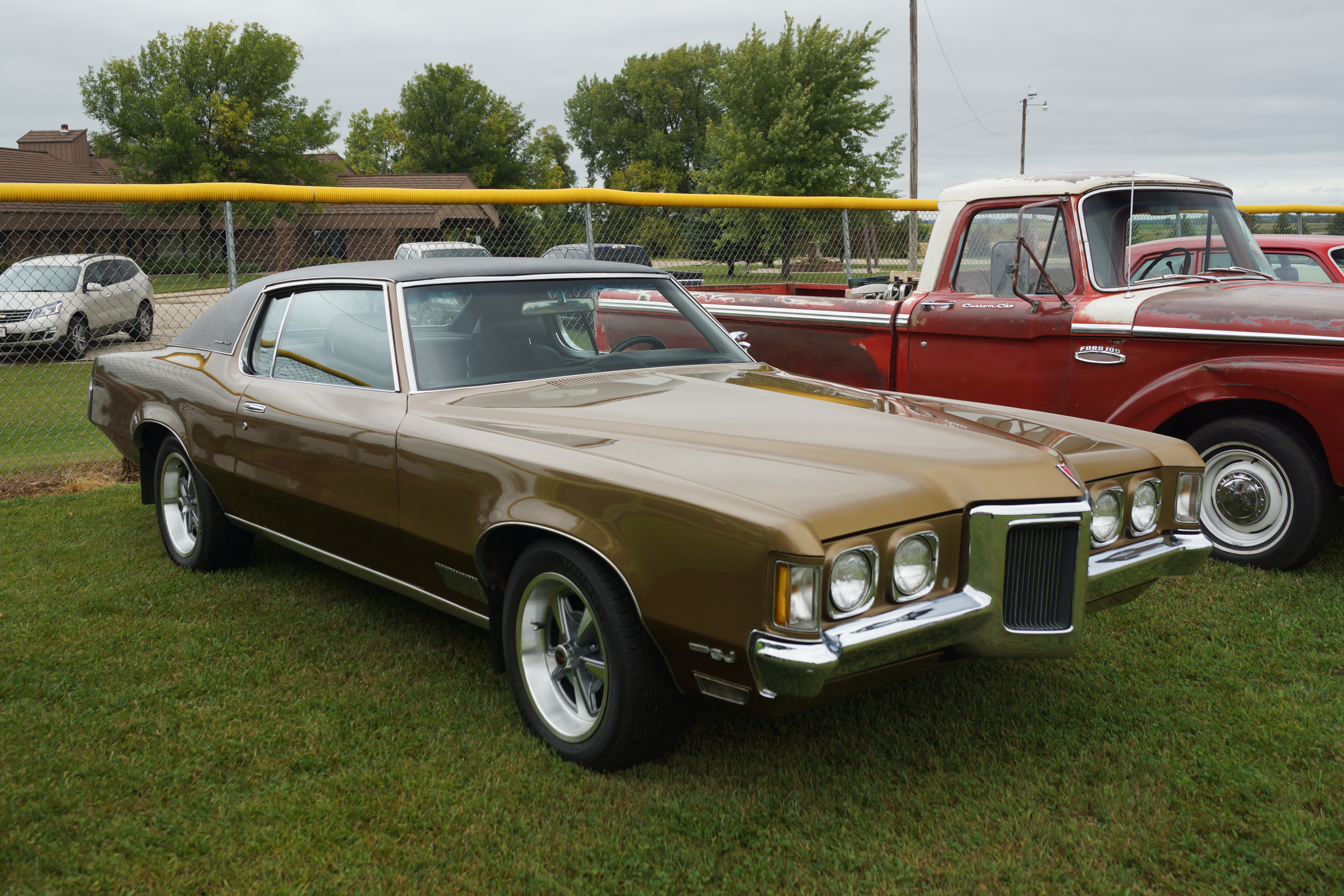
1970 Pontiac Grand Prix with SJ option

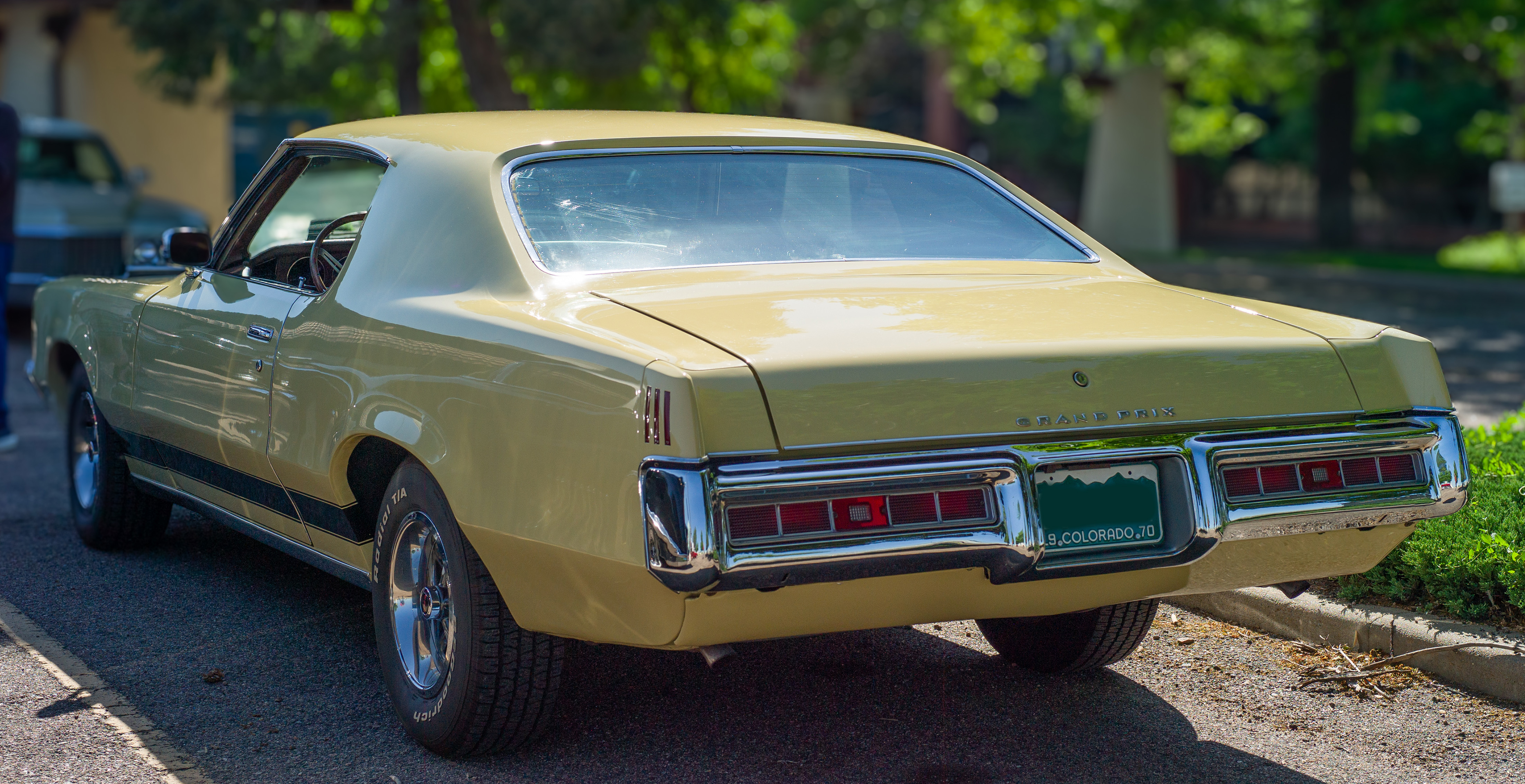
1970 Pontiac Grand Prix J

Vertical grille inserts replaced the horizontal bars of the 1969, movement of "Grand Prix" nameplates from the lower cowls to the rear C-pillars and the vertical chromed louvers from the C-pillars down to the lower cowls, highlighted the 1970 Grand Prix. The optional 428 cu in (7.0 L) V8 rated at 370 or 390 hp (276 or 291 kW) in 1969 was replaced by a new, 370 hp (276 kW) 455 cu in (7.5 L) with 500 lb⋅ft (678 N⋅m) of torque at 3,100 rpm. The base 350 hp 400 cu in (6.6 L) engine was still standard, but a low-compression 400 CID engine with a two-barrel carburetor was also available. An automatic transmission was offered as a no cost option.

Interior trim also received minor revisions, and a bench seat with center armrest returned as a no-cost option to the standard Strato bucket seats and console. Bench seat-equipped cars included a steering column-mounted shifter with the automatic transmission along with a dashboard-mounted glovebox, replacing the console-mounted shifter and glovebox of bucket-seat cars. Power front disc brakes became standard equipment this year.

Due to the success of the 1969 Grand Prix, other GM divisions followed suit and introduced similar cars for 1970. The Chevrolet Monte Carlo used the same basic G-body as the GP but with a two-inch shorter wheelbase (116 vs. the GP's 118) and a long hood, though still shorter than the Grand Prix's, but still considered an upscale vehicle for GM's lowest-priced division. Oldsmobile, whose larger and more expensive front-drive Toronado was a direct competitor to the Thunderbird, decided to further capitalize on strong sales of its intermediate Cutlass line by introducing a new Cutlass Supreme coupe with a formal roofline similar to the GPs but on the standard 112 in (2,845 mm) wheelbase used for two-door A-body intermediates and the same lower sheet metal used on other Cutlass models. Both the Monte Carlo and Cutlass Supreme were also much lower in price, primarily due to smaller 350 cu in (5.7 L) standard engines for both, and that many items standard on the GP were optional on those models — however, all three cars with similar equipment were actually much closer in price than the base sticker prices suggest. The introduction of the Monte Carlo and Cutlass Supreme did, however, cut into the Grand Prix's dominance, and sales dropped 40%. A total of 65,750 Grand Prixes were made in 1970.

Variations of the 1969 GP's central V-nose grille appeared on other 1970 Pontiacs including the full-sized cars and intermediate Tempest/Le Mans series. The 1970 Ford Thunderbird styling change was reportedly ordered by Ford Motor president Semon Knudsen, who moved from GM to Ford in 1968 after a long career at GM which included the position of general manager for the Pontiac Motor Division from 1956 until 1961, and was responsible for adding the Grand Prix to the 1962 Pontiac line.

=== 1971 ===
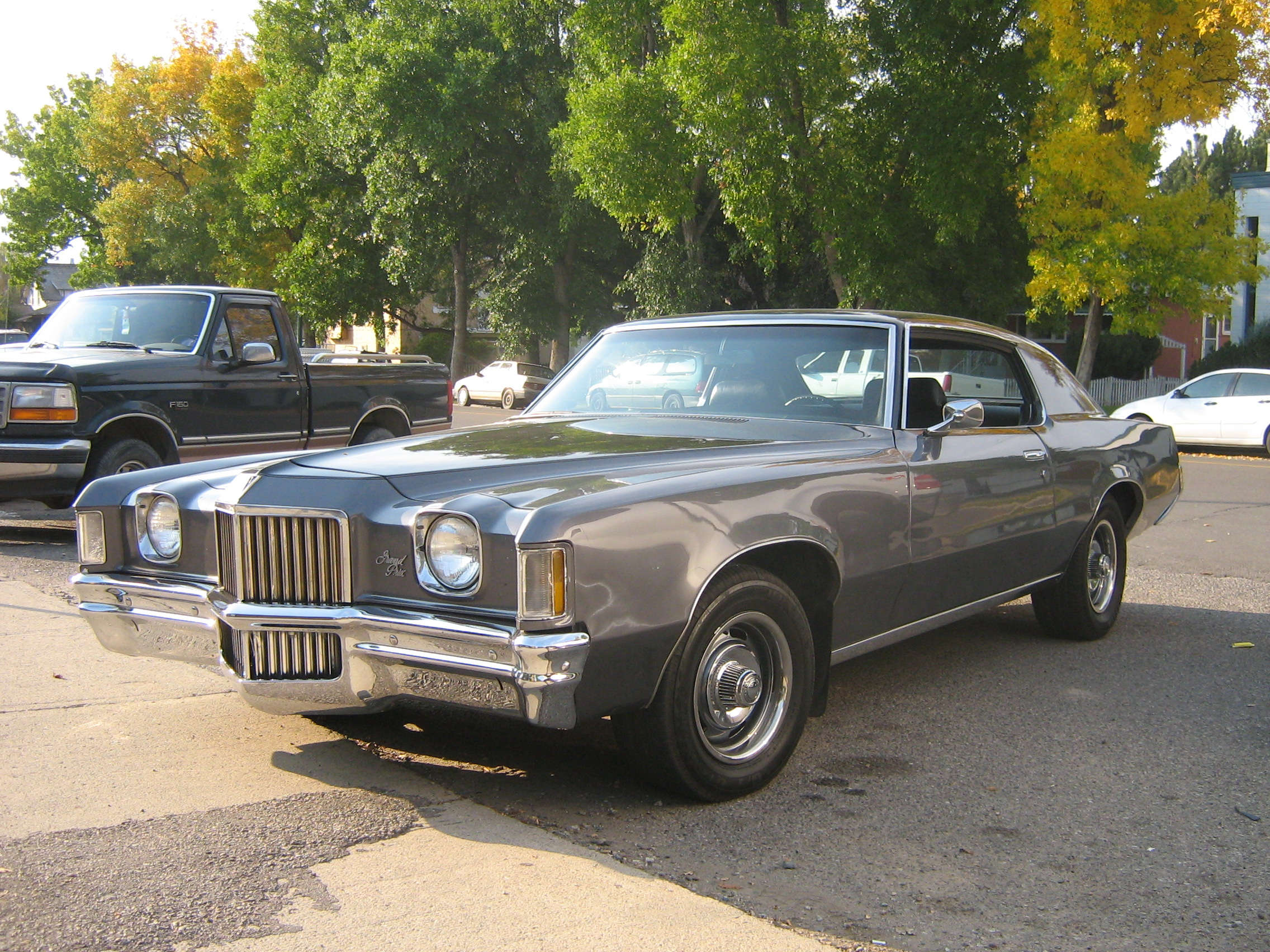
1971 Pontiac Grand Prix Hardtop Coupe. The 1971 model featured single round headlights

A new integrated bumper/grille and larger single headlights replacing the quad lights of 1969-70 models marked the introduction of the 1971 Grand Prix along with a new slanted boattail-style rear with taillights built into the bumper. Interior revisions amounted to new trim patterns for cloth and vinyl upholstery patterns for both the bench and bucket seats, but the leather interior option was discontinued.

Engine choices included the standard 400 cu in (6.6 L) V8 with four-barrel carburetor and dual exhausts, rated at 300 hp (224 kW); and the optional four-barrel 455 cu in (7.5 L) V8 rated at 325 hp (242 kW). Both engines received substantially lower compression ratios (8.4:1 for 1971 compared to 10.25:1 in 1970) as part of a GM-corporate requirement for engines to use lower-octane regular leaded, low lead or unleaded gasoline beginning with the 1971 model year. Transmission offerings initially were carried over from previous years, including the standard three-speed manual, or optional four-speed stick or Turbo Hydra-Matic. However, at mid-year, Turbo Hydra-Matic automatic became standard equipment and the manual shifters were dropped. Variable-ratio power steering was made standard equipment as well.

New power ratings were put into effect, requiring manufacturers to post net horsepower with all accessories installed (vs. gross rating without the accessories). This system gave a more realistic measure of power. The base 400 cu in (6.6 L) four-barrel engine was rated now at 255 hp (190 kW) and the 455 cu in (7.5 L) in SJ models were 260 hp (194 kW) (net). The 455 SJ model had a $195 option that included Rally gauges, body-colored mirrors, SJ badging, and a no-maintenance AC Delco battery. A corporate-wide labor strike in mid-September 1970 halted all GM production for 67 days. This delayed the production of the third generation Grand Prix by one year in 1973. Production numbers for 1971 were lower than in 1970 with only 58,325 units.

=== 1972 ===
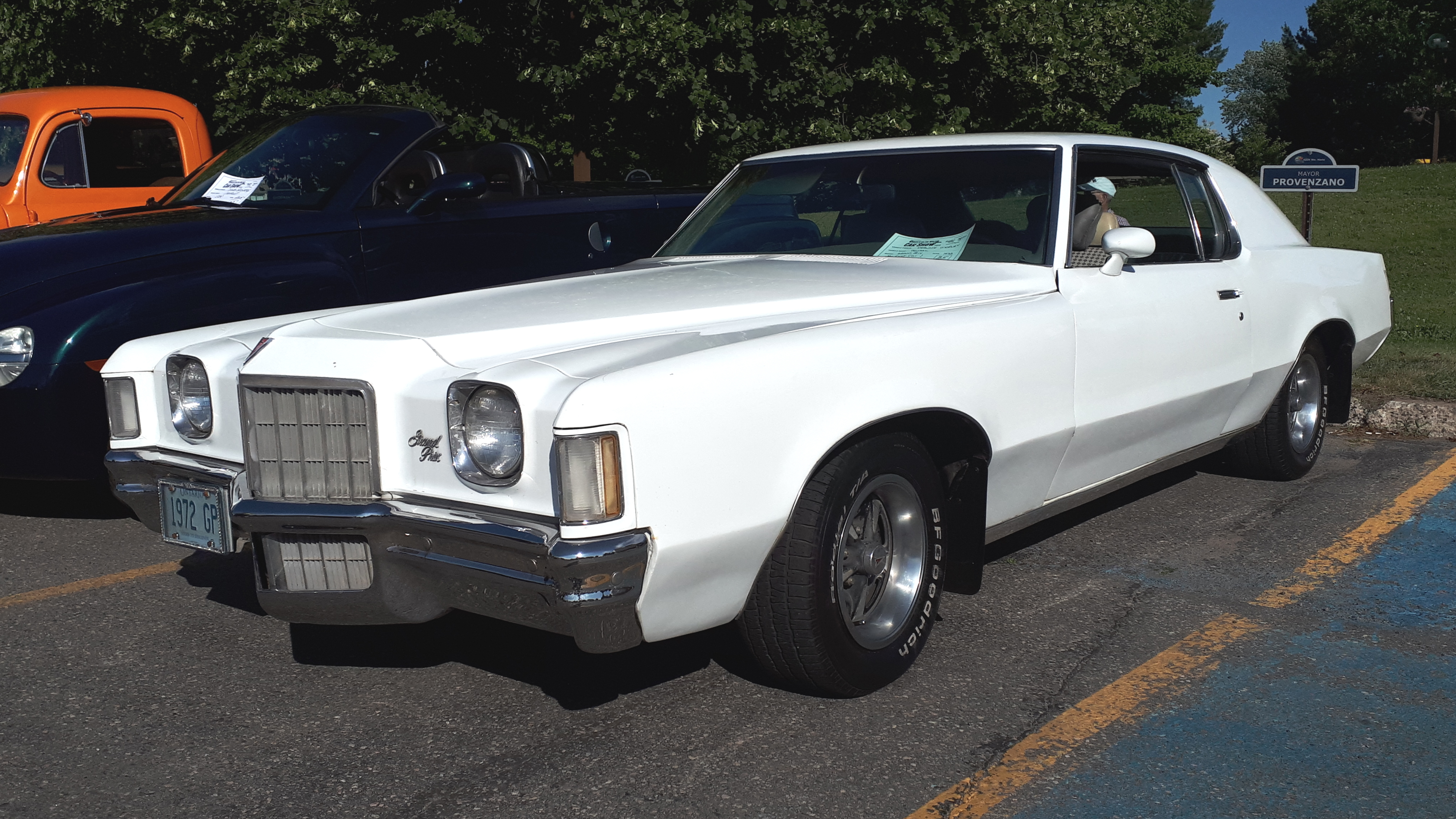
1972 Pontiac Grand Prix Hardtop Coupe

Minor styling revisions included a new cross-hatch grille up front and triple cluster taillights in the back. Inside, the burled-elm trim was replaced by a new teakwood design, and upholstery trim patterns for vinyl and cloth selections were revised for both bucket and bench seat offerings. Engine offerings remained the same as before with the major change being the change in power measurements from the previous gross method on a dynamometer to the new net ratings as installed in a vehicle with accessories and emission equipment which made the horsepower ratings of 1972 models lower than their 1971 counterparts though actual performance did not change much between the two years. Under the net horsepower measurement system, the standard 400 cu in (6.6 L) V8 with four-barrel carburetor was rated at 250 hp (186 kW) while the optional 455 cu in (7.5 L) with four-barrel carb was rated at 300 hp (224 kW).

At mid-year, Pontiac released a radial tire option for the Grand Prix, which increased the wheel diameter from the standard 14 to 15 inches. This was the first time that Pontiac offered a radial tire option for the entire model year. In 1968, Pontiac announced a radial tire option for the GTO that was quickly discontinued due to production problems.

Also at mid-year, a new "Fasten Seat Belts" light with buzzer was added per Federal safety regulation. This light was located in the speedometer pod and the speedometer was changed from displaying a high of 140 mph (225 km/h), back to 120 mph (193 km/h).

An all-new Grand Prix was scheduled for 1972. However, a 67-day corporate-wide strike at GM in late 1970 that hobbled the 1971 model introduction set back 1972 model production plans, and the new A and G-body cars planned for 1972 were delayed for introduction by one year to the 1973 model year. Production numbers increased after two years of decline, reaching 91,961 units and only second place to the 1969 model.

Pontiac Grand Prix Production Figures
	Yearly Total
1969	112,486
1970	65,750
1971	58,325
1972	91,961
Total	328,522

== Fourth generation (1973–1977) ==
Fourth generation
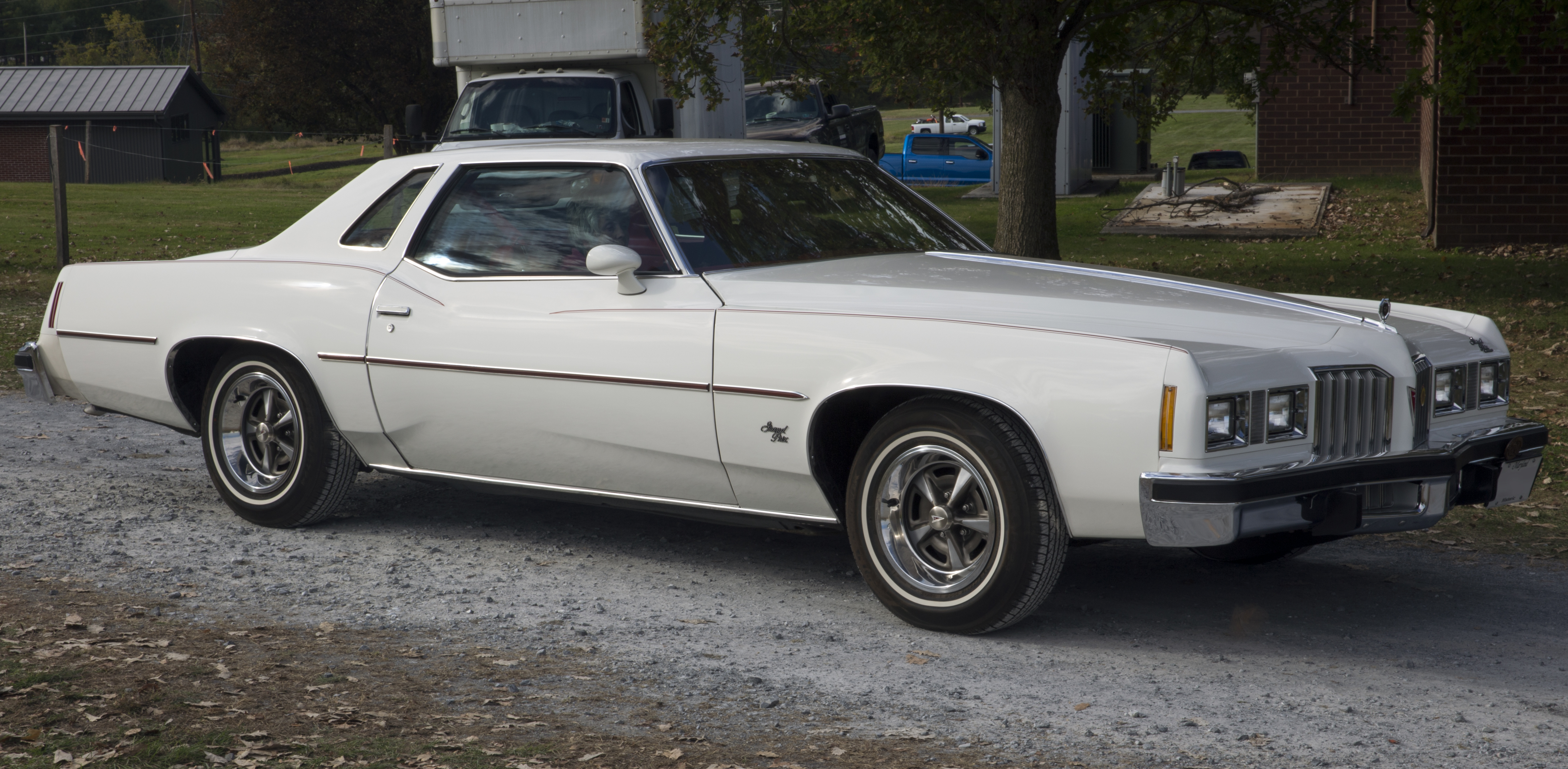
- 1977 Pontiac Grand Prix

Overview
- Production: 1972–1977
- Model years: 1973–1977
- Assembly: Pontiac Assembly, Pontiac, Michigan; Lakewood Assembly, Lakewood Heights, Georgia

Body and chassis
- Class: Mid-size personal luxury car
- Body style: 2-door coupe
- Layout: FR layout
- Platform: A-body "Special"
- Related: Chevrolet Monte Carlo; Pontiac Grand Am; Pontiac Le Mans; Oldsmobile Cutlass Supreme; Stutz Blackhawk

Powertrain
- Engine: 301 cu in (4.9 L) Pontiac V8; 350 cu in (5.7 L) Pontiac V8; 350 cu in (5.7 L) Oldsmobile V8; 350 cu in (5.7 L) Chevrolet V8; 400 cu in (6.6 L) Pontiac V8; 403 cu in (6.6 L) Oldsmobile V8; 455 cu in (7.5 L) Pontiac V8
- Transmission: 3-speed Turbo-Hydramatic automatic

Dimensions
- Wheelbase: 116 in (2,946 mm)
- Length: 216.6 in (5,502 mm)

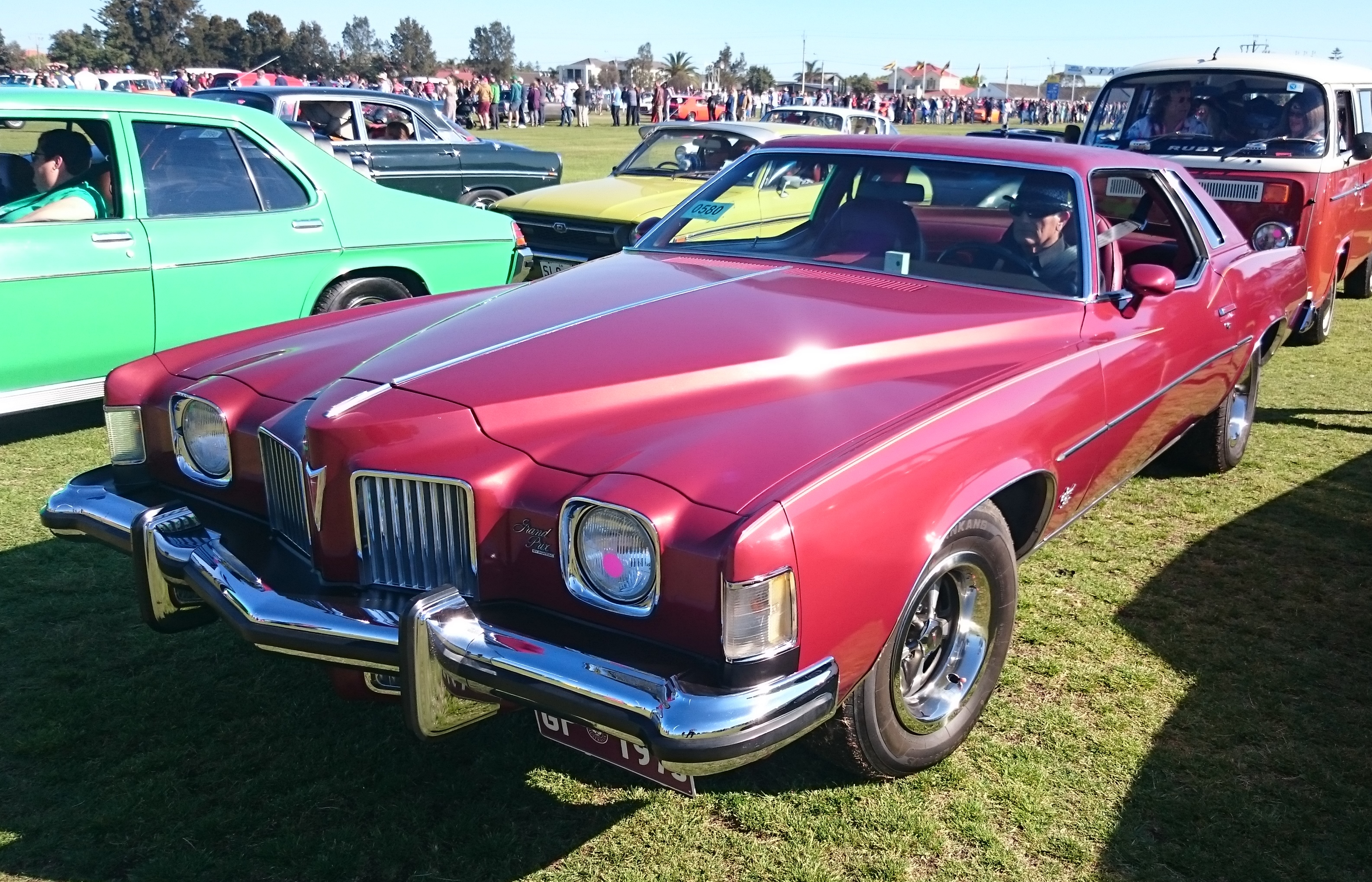
1973 Pontiac Grand Prix

All A-bodies, including the Grand Prix, were redesigned for 1973. This generation was larger and heavier, due partly to the federally mandated 5 mph crash bumpers; however, the wheelbase was reduced by two inches, now shared with the Monte Carlo and all A-body sedans, wagons and coupe utilities. Although large V8s were still available, the performance was on the decline due to new emissions control systems. The most notable styling feature of this generation was the appearance of the fixed opera window, replacing the previous disappearing rear side glass. This year's Grand Prix switched from pillarless hardtop design to a pillared "Colonnade" hardtop with frameless door glass as did all GM intermediates in response to proposed federal safety standards regarding roll-over protection.

The front and rear styling of the 1973 Grand Prix was an evolution of the 1971 and 1972 models with a vertical-bar V-nose grille and single headlamps along with the new federally mandated 5 mph (8 km/h) front bumper. The rear featured a revised boattail-like trim with square-taillights above the bumper.

A new instrument panel continued the wraparound cockpit theme of previous models with new African Crossfire Mahogany facing on the dashboard, console, and door panels, which was genuine wood in contrast with the simulated woodgrain material found in most car interiors during that time. The Strato bucket seats were completely new with higher seatbacks and integrated headrests in "Morrokide" or cloth trims, and optional recliners and adjustable lumbar support, with a notchback bench seat offered as a no-cost option.

The standard drivetrain consisted of the four-barrel 400 cu in (6.6 L) V8 rated at 230 hp (172 kW) and the Turbo Hydra-Matic transmission. Also standard were power steering and power brakes. A four-barrel 455 cu in (7.5 L) was optional and included with the "SJ" option that also added a rally gauge cluster and a radial tuned suspension with front and rear sway bars, Pliacell shock absorbers, and radial-ply tires. The introduction of radial-ply tires improved handling. GM's "A" body cars' front suspensions were based on the Chevrolet Camaro and Pontiac Firebird during this production run.

The Grand Prix continued its top level designation as Pontiac's most exclusive product, with the "SJ" option package listed for $4,962 ($35,988 in 2025 dollars) while the standard Grand Prix was listed at $4,583 ($33,239 in 2025 dollars).

Grand Prix production set a new record of over 150,000 units, despite intense competition from a similar restyled Chevy Monte Carlo, and "near" personal luxury coupes such as Buick's all-new Century Regal and Oldsmobile's Cutlass Supreme — both of whose styling and appointments were very similar to the GP and Monte Carlo, and even shared the same squared-off formal roofline with opera windows - but used the standard A-body coupe body and 112 in (2,800 mm) wheelbase shared with lower-priced models. The success of the GP (and Monte Carlo) led to direct responses from Ford Motor Company the following year with a larger Ford Elite and Mercury Cougar, which were followed by Chrysler entries in 1975, the Dodge Charger and Chrysler Cordoba.

=== 1974 ===
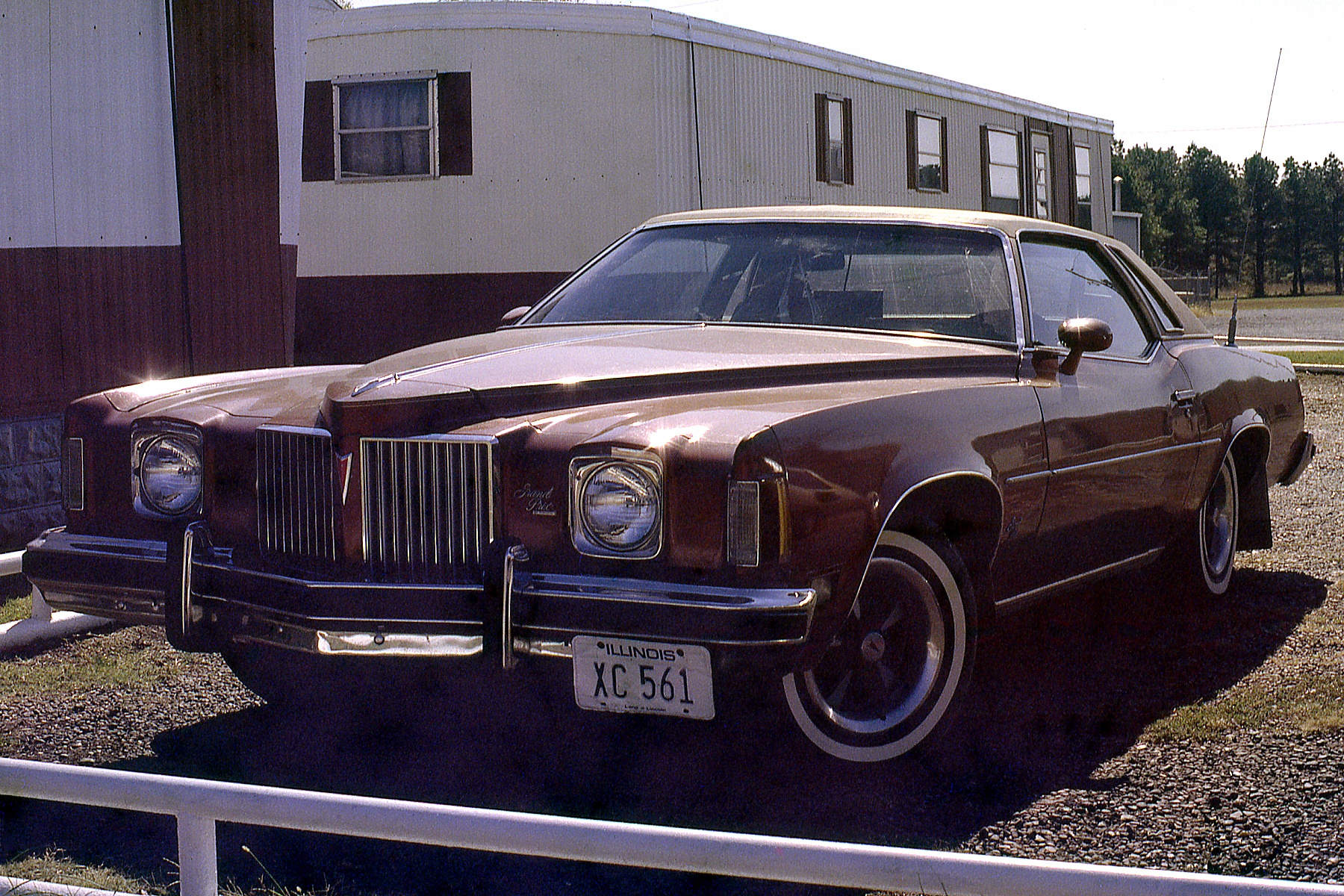
1974 Pontiac Grand Prix Model SJ

The 1974 Grand Prix received a revised split grille with vertical bars that was entirely above the bumper. The boattail effect was softened due to a new federally mandated 5 mph (8.0 km/h) bumper that was added to the similar mandated front bumper introduced in 1973. The license plate and fuel filler were moved above the bumper and taillight lenses were revised.

The interior trim remained virtually unchanged from 1973, with standard seating choices, including Strato bucket seats with center console or notchback bench seat with an armrest and cloth or "Morrokide" upholstery. The bucket seats were available with optional recliners and adjustable lumbar support. The real African Crossfire Mahogany trim was replaced by a simulated material for the instrument panel due to splintering problems on 1973 models; the "real" wood was continued on the console and door panels for another two years. A new cut-pile carpeting replaced the nylon loop rugs of previous years.

A federally mandated interlock system required the driver and front-seat passenger to fasten their seat belts to start the car. This system was offered only for 1974 and on some early 1975 models. It was rescinded by Congressional action.

Engines were carried over from 1973, including the 400 cu in (6.6 L) V8 which was standard on the new "Model J" trim package, and 455 cu in (7.5 L) which was standard on the "Model SJ", and optional on the "Model J". A Turbo Hydra-Matic transmission, variable-ratio power steering, and power brakes were standard equipment on both models. In addition to the 455 V8, the "Model SJ" also added a Rally Gauge Cluster, "SJ" identification, and a radial-tuned suspension similar to Pontiac's Grand Am. Radial tires were also a new option on the "Model J" this year.

Sales of Grand Prixes for the 1974 model year dropped from 1973's record of around 150,000 units to just under 100,000 units primarily due to new competition in the intermediate personal-luxury car market from a new upsized Mercury Cougar XR-7 coupe and Ford Elite, both based on the Dearborn's intermediate Torino/Montego platform. Still, 1974 was the third best-selling year to date for the Pontiac Grand Prix.

=== 1975 ===
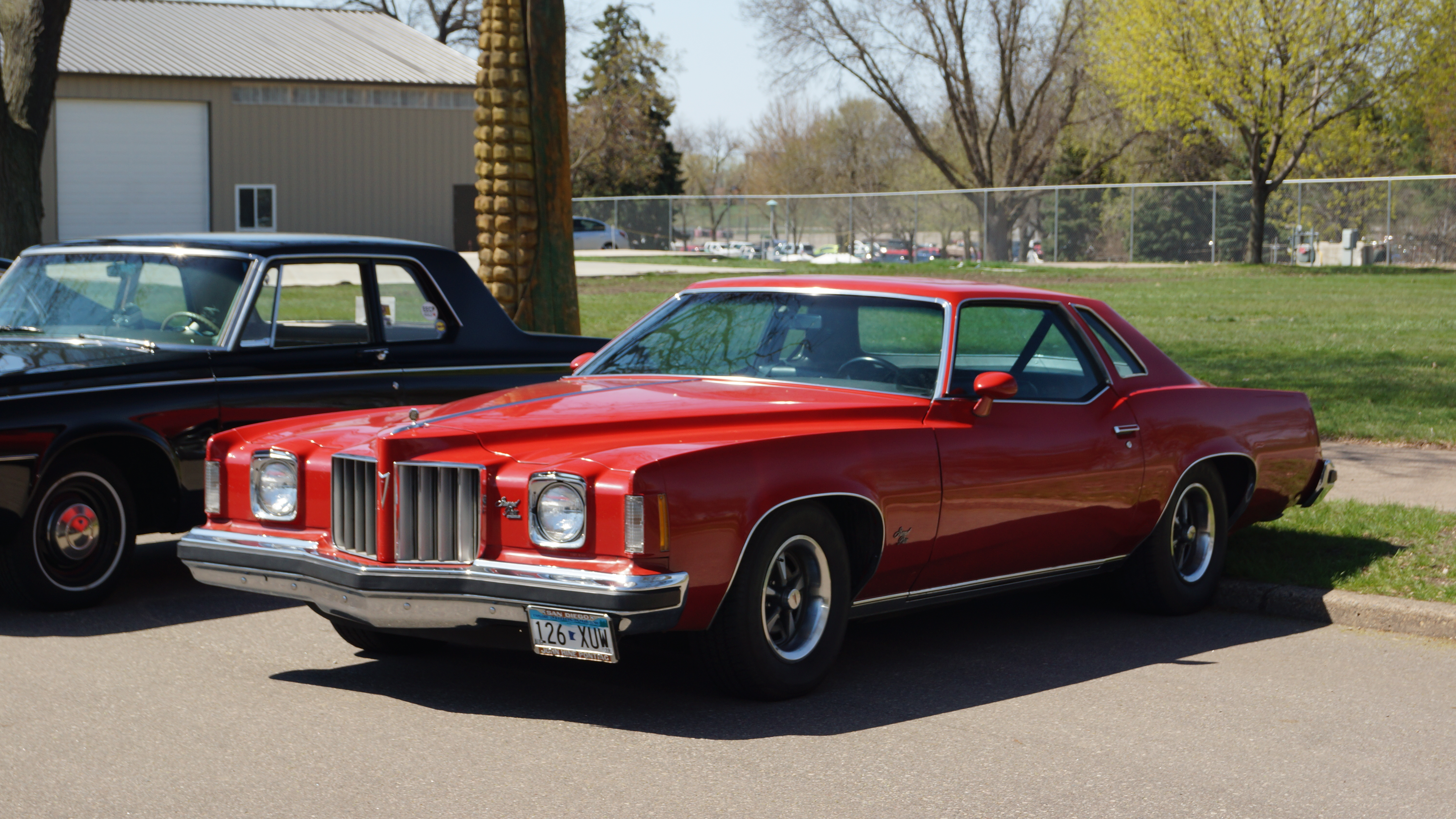
1975 Pontiac Grand Prix

A revised grille with fewer vertical bars and revised taillight lenses marked the 1975 Grand Prix. Changes included the addition of GM's High Energy electronic ignition and a catalytic converter that mandated the use of unleaded gasoline. Radial tires became standard on all models.

A new luxury LJ model was added as the new top model. The base Model J remained available, as well as the SJ. The LJ included pinstriping and a velour interior trim. Speedometers were revised with numerals now topping at 100 mph (161 km/h) rather than the 120 or 140 mph (225 km/h) readings found in previous years and speed readings in kilometers were added.

The addition of the catalytic converter spelled the end of dual exhaust for 1975 and detuning of engines. The 400 cu in (6.6 L) V8 (standard on J and LJ models) dropped from 230 to 180 hp (172 to 134 kW) while the 455 cu in (7.5 L) (standard on SJ, optional on J and LJ) was detuned from 250 to 200 hp (186 to 149 kW). New for 1975 was a more economical 170 hp (127 kW), 400 cu in (6.6 L) V8 with a two-barrel carburetor, available as a no-cost option on J and LJ models.

Sales dropped to 86,582 units thanks to an aging design, continued recession resulting from the 1973-1974 energy crisis, substantially higher prices for all 1975-model cars due to that year's safety and emission control regulations, and intense competition from Ford's Cougar and Elite, and Chrysler Corporation's two new entries in this class including the Chrysler Cordoba and Dodge Charger SE.

The model mix was 64,581 base J models, 7,146 SJs, and 14,855 of the new LJ.

=== 1976 ===
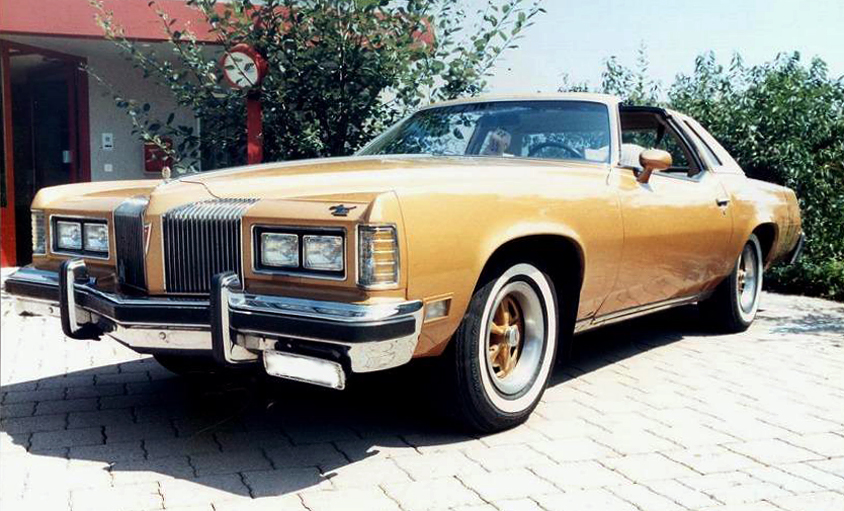
1976 Pontiac Grand Prix LJ Golden Anniversary Edition

A new split vertical bar "waterfall" grille and quad rectangular headlights in front and revised taillight lenses highlighted the 1976 Grand Prix. The same three model designations continued (J, SJ, and LJ) with the LJ and SJ offering the same trim and equipment levels as in 1975 with the exception being the SJ downgraded to a standard 400 cu in (6.6 L) V8.

The base Model J underwent a number of content changes to cut the base price by around $500 to be more competitive with other mid-sized personal luxury cars. Those changes for the "J" included a smaller 160 hp (119 kW) 350 cu in (5.7 L) V8 as the base powerplant and some downgrading of interior trim that included a new notchback bench seat made standard equipment and the Strato bucket seats/console became optional. Features such as a cushioned steering wheel and custom pedal trim plates became optional on Model J, but remained standard on LJ and SJ, both of which also continued to include Strato bucket seats as standard equipment. All models got a new simulated rosewood trim for the dash, door panels, and console (with bucket seats) that replaced the African Crossfire Mahogany trim of previous years. Upholstery choices included cloth or "Morrokide" vinyl bench or bucket seats on the Model J, velour buckets on the LJ, or "Morrokide" buckets on the SJ. Leather interior trim was a new extra-cost option available with the Strato bucket seats and LJ and SJ models. Both the "LJ" and "SJ" models came standard with a 180 hp (134 kW) 400 V8 that was optional on the Model J. The 200 hp (149 kW) 455 V8 was optional on all models.

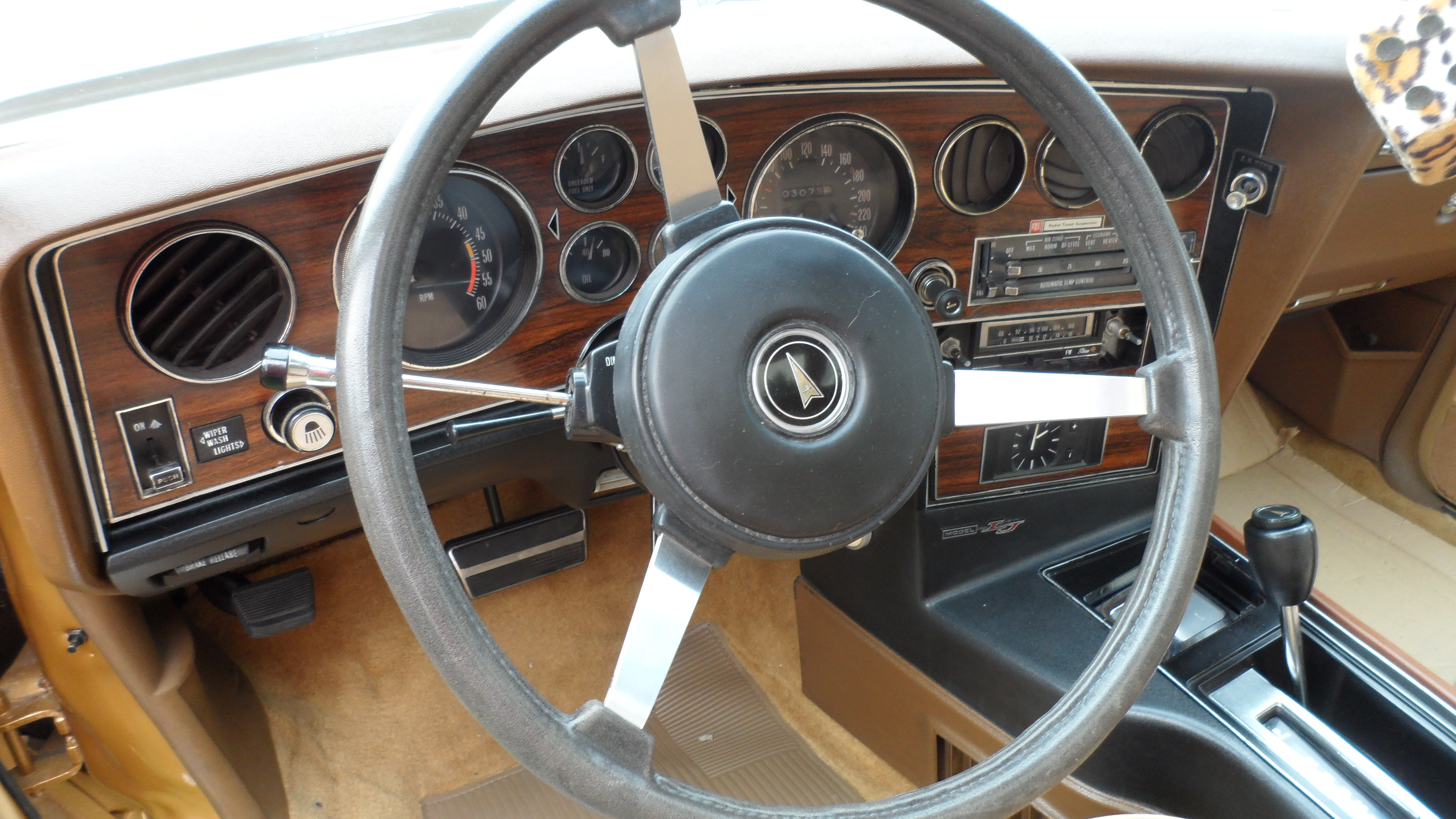
1976 Pontiac Grand Prix LJ Golden Anniversary Edition interior

In celebration of Pontiac's 50th anniversary in 1976, a number of special edition Grand Prix were produced. Technically a LJ trim option, these models featured removable Hurst T-tops, color-keyed Rally II wheels, special "Anniversary Gold" paint (actually the new Cadillac Seville's "Autumn Gold) accented by a white opera roof and white side protection. The only available interior color was Light Buckskin. Among the other distinctions was special badging with Golden hood and trunk medallions and a Golden "arrow head" logo in the steering wheel. Buyers could opt for other accessories available for the LJ. Many chose sport instrumentation, sport steering wheels, or leather upholstery. Mechanically, they were similar to the regular models. This was one of two anniversary models offered by Pontiac, the other was a special trim Firebird.

Grand Prix production increased: sales went up to 228,091 units total (an increase of 226%), making this Bicentennial year the best in Grand Prix' history — and second in its class only to the Chevrolet Monte Carlo with 353,272 units. This included 110,814 base model Js, 88,232 SJs, and 29,045 LJs (including 4,807 Golden Anniversary editions and a single demonstrator with Pontiac's not yet introduced 301 cu in (4.9 L) V8 engine.

=== 1977 ===
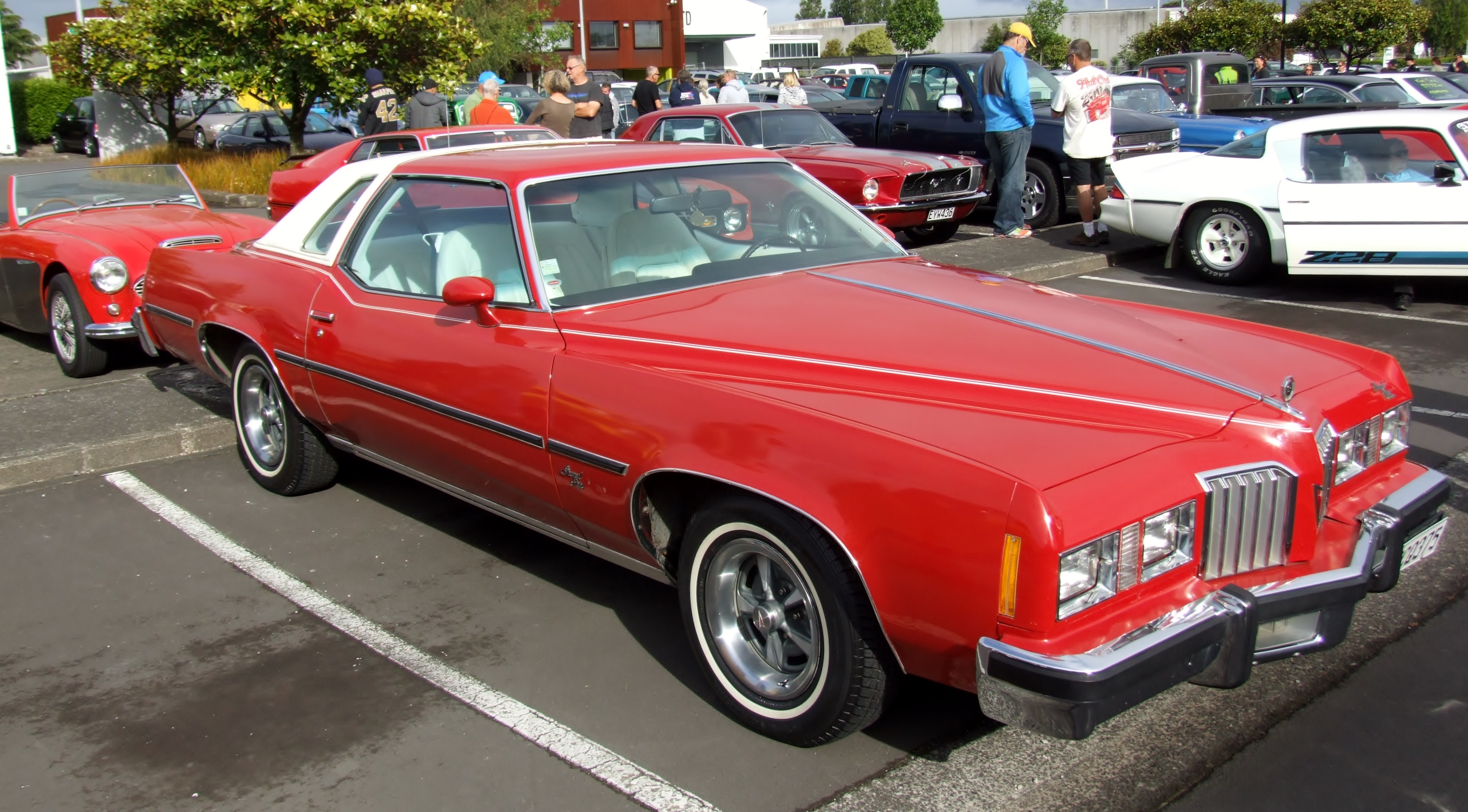
1977 Pontiac Grand Prix

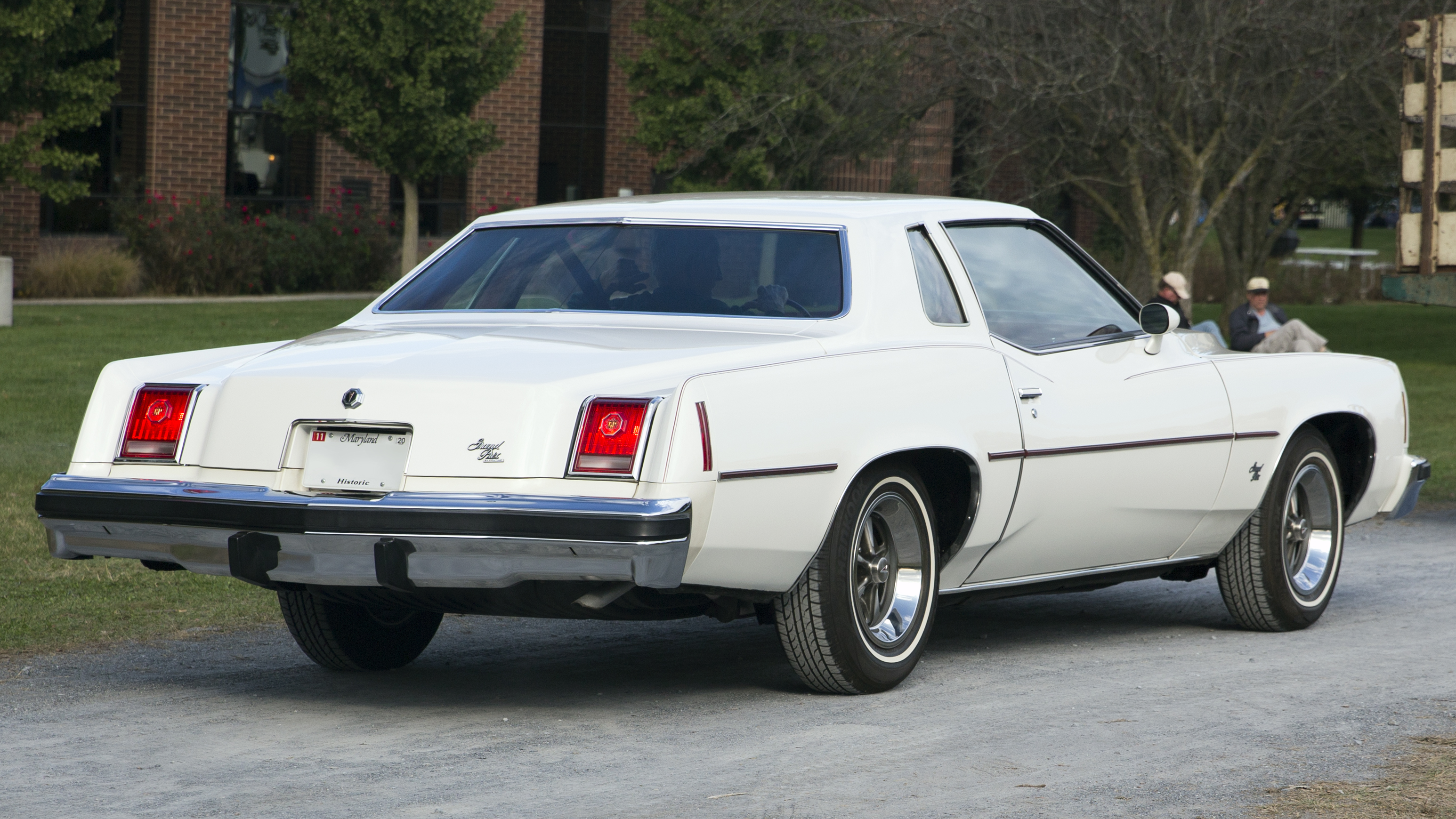
1977 Pontiac Grand Prix (rear)

A complete reworking of the front header and bumper highlighted the 1977 Grand Prix, which was the final year for the 1973-vintage bodyshell that was set to be replaced by a downsized GP for 1978. The parking lamps were now positioned between the quad headlamps (same setup as a 1967 or 1968 Oldsmobile Cutlass), and the previous year's 'waterfall' grille was replaced by a narrower one that extended into the lower portion of the bumper. Behind the bumper were new reinforcements (mounting panels) made from aluminum rather than steel to reduce weight. In back the taillights were simplified to eliminate the weighty pot metal bezels that created the horizontal stripe effect in 1976. The same three models (J, LJ, and SJ) were carried over with engine revisions. The base Model J got Pontiac's new 135 hp (101 kW), 301 cu in (4.9 L) V8 as standard equipment. Optional engines included a 160 hp (119 kW) 350 V8 or a 180 hp (134 kW) 400; those two engines standard on the LJ and SJ models, respectively. The original thinking on the 301 CID engine was that the weight savings from using a significantly lighter engine would cancel out the horsepower loss from the smaller displacement. This turned out to be a major miscalculation and 301 equipped cars became much less desirable among Grand Prix enthusiasts and collectors in later years. The 301 also had a knocking (pre-ignition) problem that was later determined to be caused by the shape of the combustion chamber.

Each of those engines were Pontiac-built units as in previous years, but offered in 49 of the 50 states. Because Pontiac's own V8 engines could not meet the more stringent California emission standards set for 1977, all Grand Prixes (and other Pontiac models) sold in California were powered by Oldsmobile-built engines including Lansing's 350 cu in (5.7 L) "Rocket V8" for J and LJ, and the 403 cu in (6.6 L) Rocket V8 standard on the SJ and optional on the other two GPs in California. Due to a shortage of Oldsmobile 350 engines resulting from record sales of Cutlasses and reduced production of that engine due to a plant conversion to build a Diesel V8 beginning in 1978, a few 1977 Grand Prixes destined for California reportedly came off the line with a Chevrolet-built 350 V8.

Grand Prix sales increased to an all-time high of over 270,000 units for 1977, the last year for this bodystyle, despite competition from a newly downsized and lower-priced Ford Thunderbird introduced this year and a restyled Mercury Cougar XR-7 whose bodyshell switched to the T-Bird this year from the discontinued Ford Torino/Mercury Montego.

Pontiac Grand Prix Production Figures
	Yearly Total
1973	153,899
1974	99,817
1975	86,582
1976	228,091
1977	288,430
Total	856,819

== Fifth generation (1978–1987) ==
Fifth generation
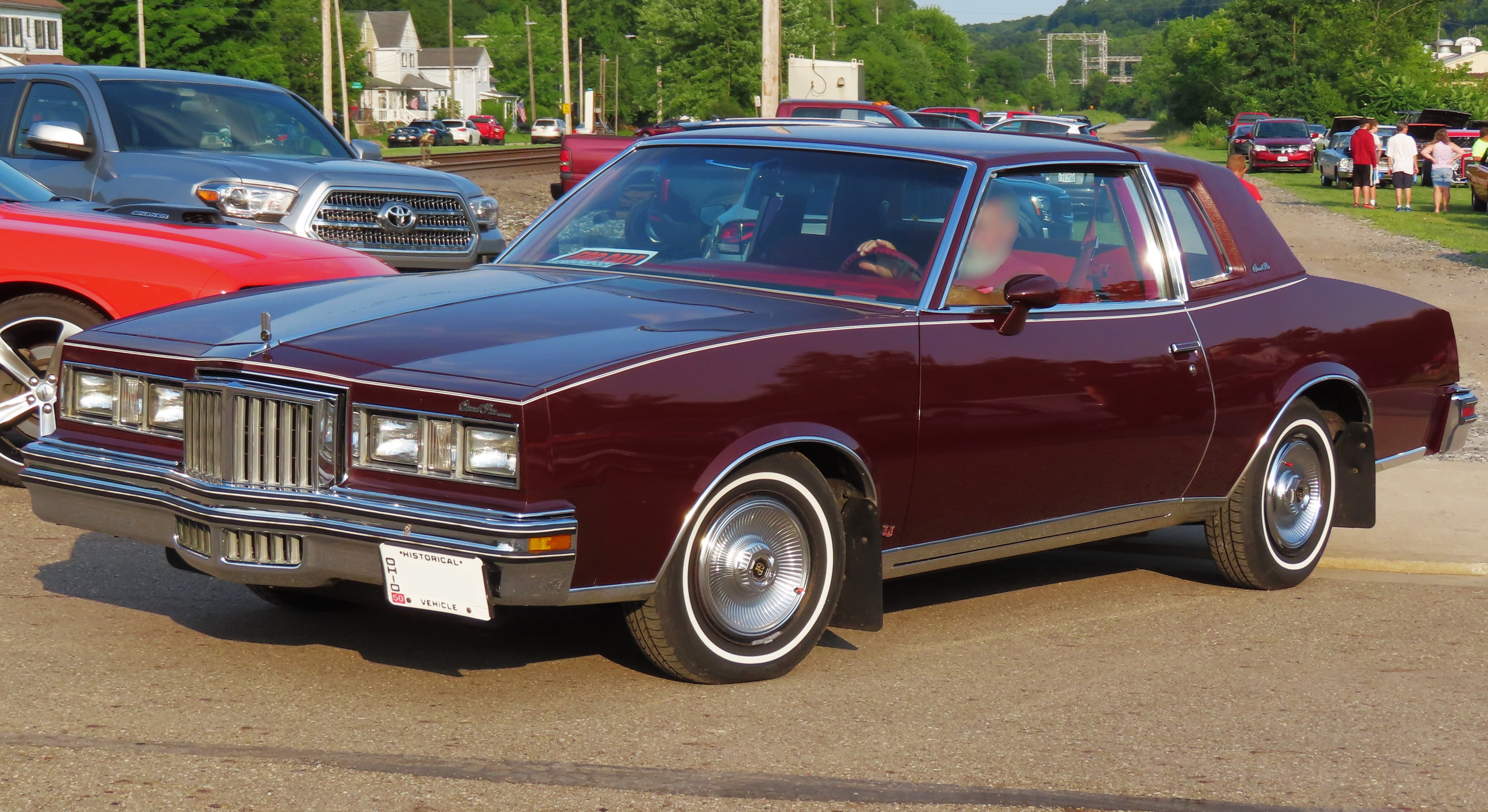
- 1978 Pontiac Grand Prix LJ

Overview
- Production: 1977–1987
- Model years: 1978–1987
- Assembly: Pontiac, Michigan, (Pontiac Assembly) United States; Baltimore, Maryland, (Baltimore Assembly) United States; Lakewood Assembly, Lakewood Heights, Georgia United States; Sainte-Thérèse, Quebec, Canada (Sainte-Thérèse Assembly)

Body and chassis
- Body style: 2-door coupe
- Layout: FR layout
- Platform: A-body (1978–1981); G-body (1982–1987)
- Related: Buick Regal; Chevrolet Monte Carlo; Oldsmobile Cutlass Supreme; Pontiac Bonneville; Pontiac Le Mans; Oldsmobile Cutlass

Powertrain
- Engine: 231 cu in (3.8 L) Buick LD5 V6; 252 cu in (4.1 L) Buick LC4 V6; 262 cu in (4.3 L) Chevrolet LB4 V6; 265 cu in (4.3 L) Pontiac LS5 V8; 301 cu in (4.9 L) Pontiac L27/L37 V8; 305 cu in (5.0 L) Chevrolet LE9 V8; 350 cu in (5.7 L) Oldsmobile LF9 diesel V8
- Transmission: 3-speed Turbo-Hydramatic

Dimensions
- Wheelbase: 108 in (2,743 mm)
- Length: 201.8 in (5,126 mm)
- Width: 72.76 in (1,848 mm)

1978 brought a downsizing of the Grand Prix and the other A-bodies. The 1978 GP was about 1 foot (0.3 m) shorter and 600 lb (270 kg) lighter than the 1977 model, with an overall length of 201.8 in (5,126 mm) and a 108 in (2,743 mm) wheelbase.

For the first time in Grand Prix history, a V8 engine was not standard equipment. In order to meet Corporate Average Fuel Economy (CAFE) mandates set after 1973-74 energy crisis, a Buick-built 231 cu in (3.8 L) V6 was standard equipment on the base model (formerly the Model J) and two versions of the Pontiac "301" V8 (Chevy "305" V8 in California) were optional. The luxury LJ model came standard with the 135 hp (101 kW) 301 V8 with two-barrel carburetor while the sporty SJ was powered by a 150 hp (112 kW) 301 V8 with a four-barrel carburetor. Top speed for the six-cylinder was about 96 mph (154 km/h), while the top-of-the-line 150 hp (112 kW) V8 could reach 109 mph (175 km/h).

A floor-mounted three-speed manual transmission was standard equipment with the V6 on the base model and the three-speed Turbo Hydra-Matic automatic was optional. Turbo Hydra-Matic was standard on LJ and SJ models and base models with either of the optional V8 engines. Standard seating choices by model included a notchback bench seat with cloth or "Morrokide" vinyl in the base GP, a pillowed velour cloth notchback bench seat in the LJ, or Strato bucket seats in cloth or "Morrokide" in the SJ. The Strato buckets were optional on the base GP and a 60/40 split-bench was optional on both base and LJ models. Viscount leather upholstery was available with bucket seats on SJ models.

=== 1979 ===
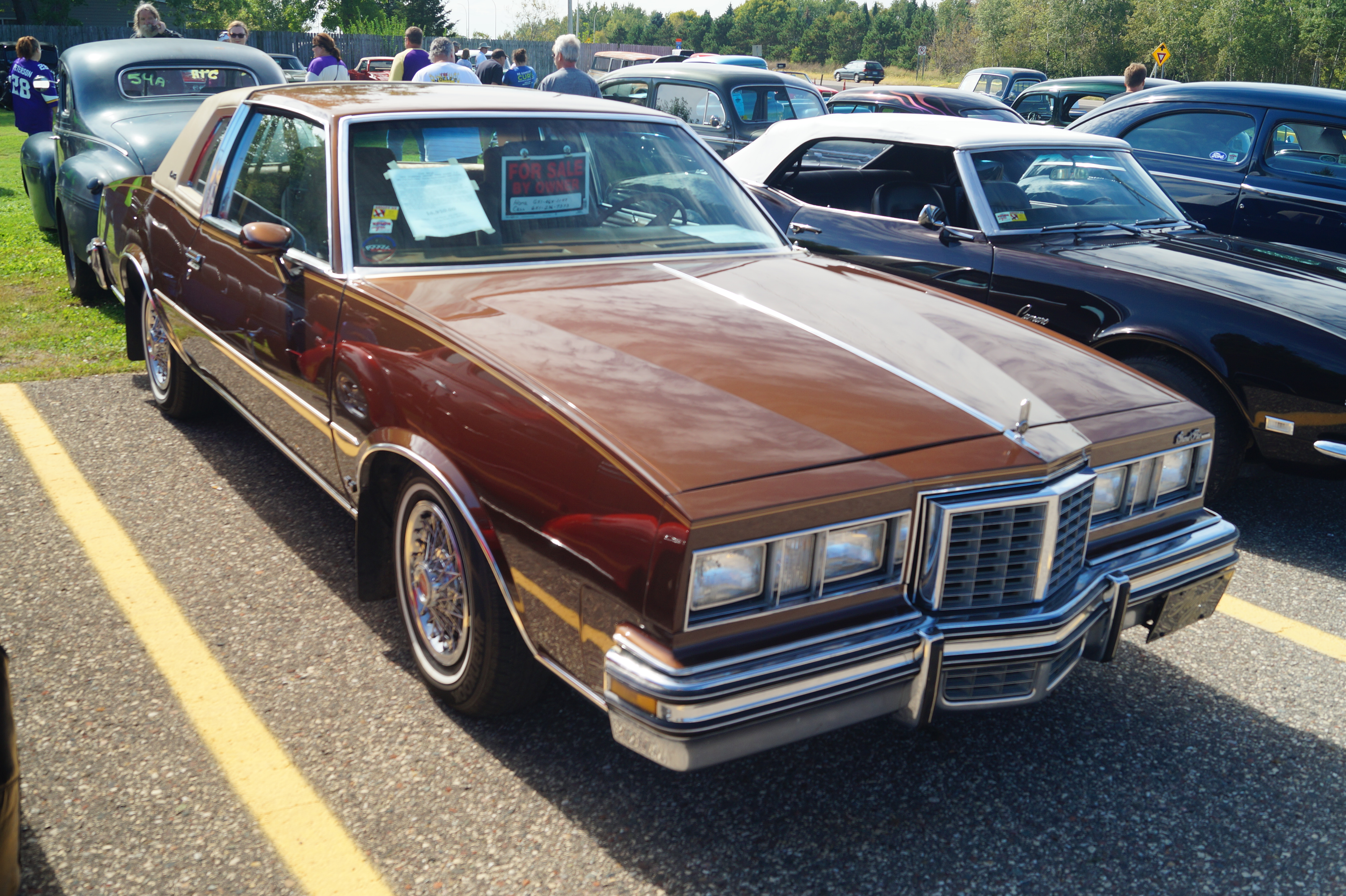
1979 Pontiac Grand Prix LJ

A new crosshatch grille and revised taillight lenses were the only appearance changes made to the 1979 Grand Prix. The same models, base, LJ and SJ continued as before as did the basic engine lineup including the 231 cu in (3.8 L) Buick V6 standard on base and LJ models, the 135 hp (101 kW) 301 cu in (4.9 L) Pontiac V8 with two-barrel carburetor that was optional on both of those models, and the 150 hp (112 kW) 301 V8 with four-barrel carburetion that was standard on the SJ and optional on the other models. Transmissions remained the same as before with the three-speed manual standard with the V6 engine on the base model and automatic transmission optional. The automatic transmission was standard on LJ and SJ models and all models when a V8 engine was ordered. Again, the Pontiac V8s were not available in California, where they were replaced by Chevy 305 cu in (5.0 L) rated at 140 and 160 hp (120 kW). A new and one-year-only option this year was a four-speed manual transmission available with the 301 cu in (4.9 L) four-barrel or two-barrel V8 on all models. Only 232 4-speed/301 V8 cars were built.

=== 1980 ===
The 1980 Grand Prix returned to a vertical bar grille and featured new taillight lenses with "GP" logos. Automatic transmission was standard equipment on all models and the two-barrel Pontiac 301 V8 was replaced by a new 265 cu in (4.3 L) V8 rated at 125 hp (93 kW). The Buick 231 V6 and the four-barrel version of the Pontiac 301 V8 were carried over from the previous year as was the Chevy 305 V8 offered in California.

=== 1981 ===
A minor reskinning of the sheet metal for improved aerodynamics marked the 1981 Grand Prix along with a new grille design and revised tail section. The SJ model was dropped and a new Brougham series was now the flagship of the Grand Prix line. The Brougham models came standard with all power options, a plush cloth interior similar to the full-sized Bonneville Brougham, and a half roof vinyl top with coach lamps. The base and LJ models continued as before. All models now came standard with the Buick 231 cu in (3.8 L) V6 with the 265 cu in (4.3 L) Pontiac V8 available as an extra cost option (Chevy 305 cu in (5.0 L) V8 in California). The 301 V8 was discontinued and a new option this year was the Oldsmobile-built 350 cu in (5.7 L) Diesel V8, which was not often ordered due to high cost of around $700 and poor reliability. The year 1981 was also the last for Pontiac Motor Division to offer its V8 engine due to an emerging GM corporate engine policy that determined Pontiac would build only four-cylinder engines and Buick only V6 engines, leaving Chevrolet and Oldsmobile to build V8 engines for most GM cars and trucks, while Cadillac would produce an aluminum-block V8 that debuted in 1982. From 1982-on, all V8-equipped Pontiacs were equipped with Chevy or Olds engines.

=== 1982 ===
The 1982 Grand Prix was a virtual rerun of the 1981 model with no appearance changes to note. No gasoline-powered V8 engines were offered this year (in the U.S. only — Canadian GPs were available with the Chevy 305 V8 as an option in '82), leaving only the standard 231 cu in (3.8 L) Buick V6, a larger Buick 252 cu in (4.1 L) V6 and the Olds 350 cu in (5.7 L) Diesel V8. The A-body line became front-wheel-drive, leaving the rear-wheel-drive midsize platform as the G-body. The downsized four-door Bonneville was now related to the Grand Prix. The automatic climate control option was also dropped in 1981, leaving just manual climate control on all models. Most 1982 models had a two tone interior. Front suspension was independent with wishbones, coil springs, antiroll bars, and telescopic shocks while the rear still had a live axle.

=== 1983 ===
1983 Grand Prix models specifically had no hood ornament and trim, and no rear trunk lock cover. One significant engine change to note was the 252 cu in (4.1 L) V6 was discontinued and the gas-powered V8 returned after a one-year absence (on U.S. models) in the form of a 150 hp (112 kW) Chevy 305 cu in (5.0 L). 1983 also marked the end of the LJ series, as the LE model would be added in for the 1984 model year.

=== 1984 ===
Some minor changes and revisions marked the 1984 Grand Prix, including the return of the octagonal Pontiac hood ornament (which originally debuted in 1976), gauges with orange needles and red markings (previous 1978–1983 Grand Prix gauges had white needles), a T-shaped console shifter, an updated bucket seat design, as well as a woodgrain plate above the glove box (previous 1978–1983 Grand Prixes used a black plate). A new optional four-spoke steering wheel was also available. The base and Brougham models continued as before but the LJ was replaced by a new LE model. Same engines continued as before including the Buick 231 cu in (3.8 L) V6, Chevy 305 cu in (5.0 L) V8 and Olds 350 cu in (5.7 L) Diesel V8. A new option this year was the Turbo Hydra-Matic 200-4R four-speed overdrive automatic available with the 305 V8 for improved highway gas mileage.

=== 1985 ===
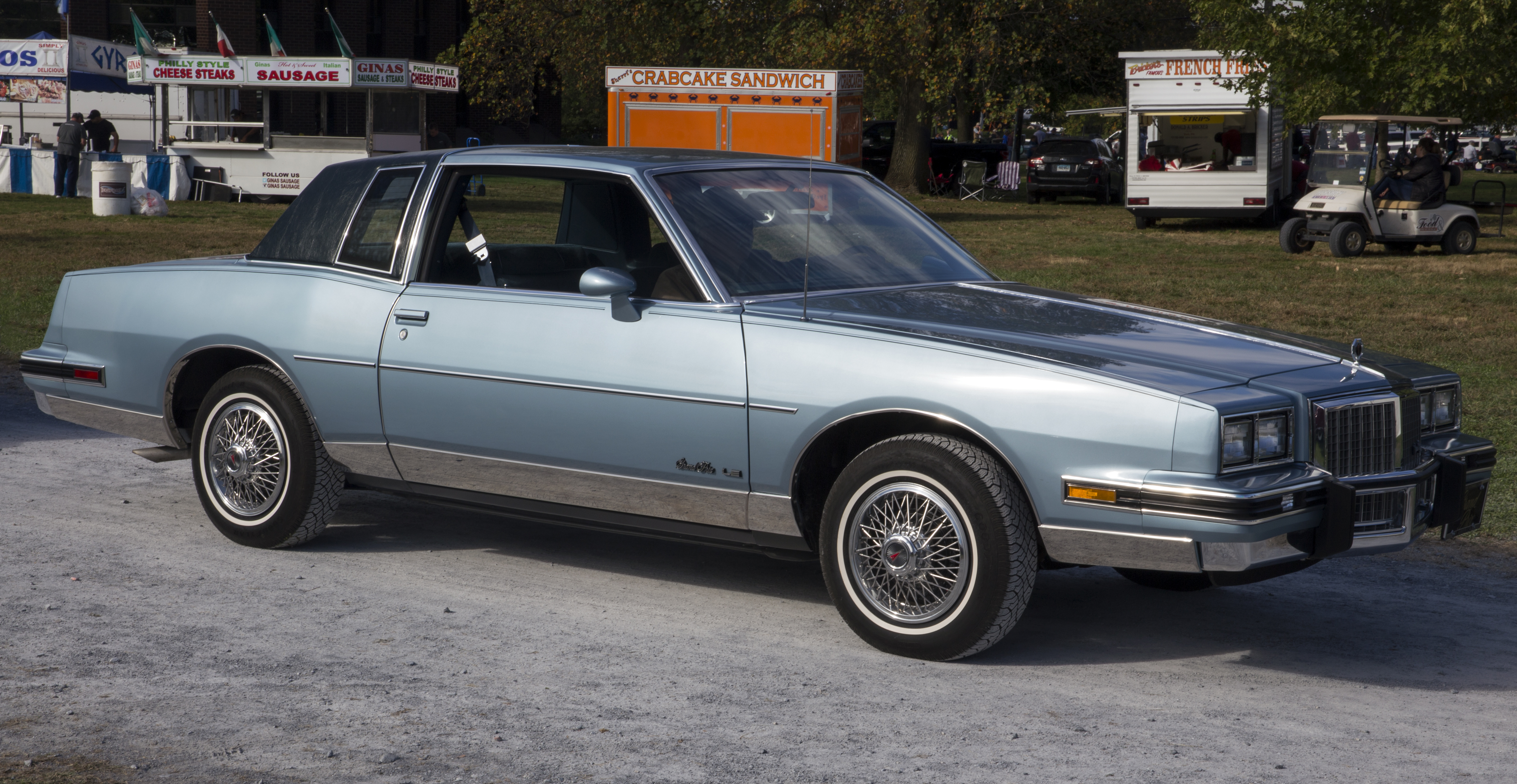
1985 Pontiac Grand Prix LE coupe

For 1985, Grand Prix's now included a new checkerboard grille design, as well as an optional two-tone paint scheme with a fading body stripe. The octagonal 'GP' logo also returned to the taillights. 1985 marked the last year for the flat rear deck panel in the interior, as by 1986 laws mandated cars to have a third brake light installed. New rectangular digital ETR stereo system options were introduced and replaced the dial pushbutton stereos. Options specific for the 1985 Pontiac Grand Prix include a factory rear spoiler, rare aluminum turbo finned wheels, and a full-size spare tire. The standard engine for 1985 was the 110 hp (82 kW) Buick built 3.8 L V6 with a 150 hp (112 kW) Chevy 5.0 L V8 optional. The 5.7 L Olds Diesel V8 was dropped from the option list. Equipment levels were Standard, LE, and Brougham.

An ad for the 1985 GP promoted the fact that its instrument panel still used dials for gauges. It was highlighted by a question similar to one long used in advertisements for Dial soap since the late 1950s, "Aren't You Glad We Use Dials. Don't You Wish Everybody Did?"

=== 1986 ===
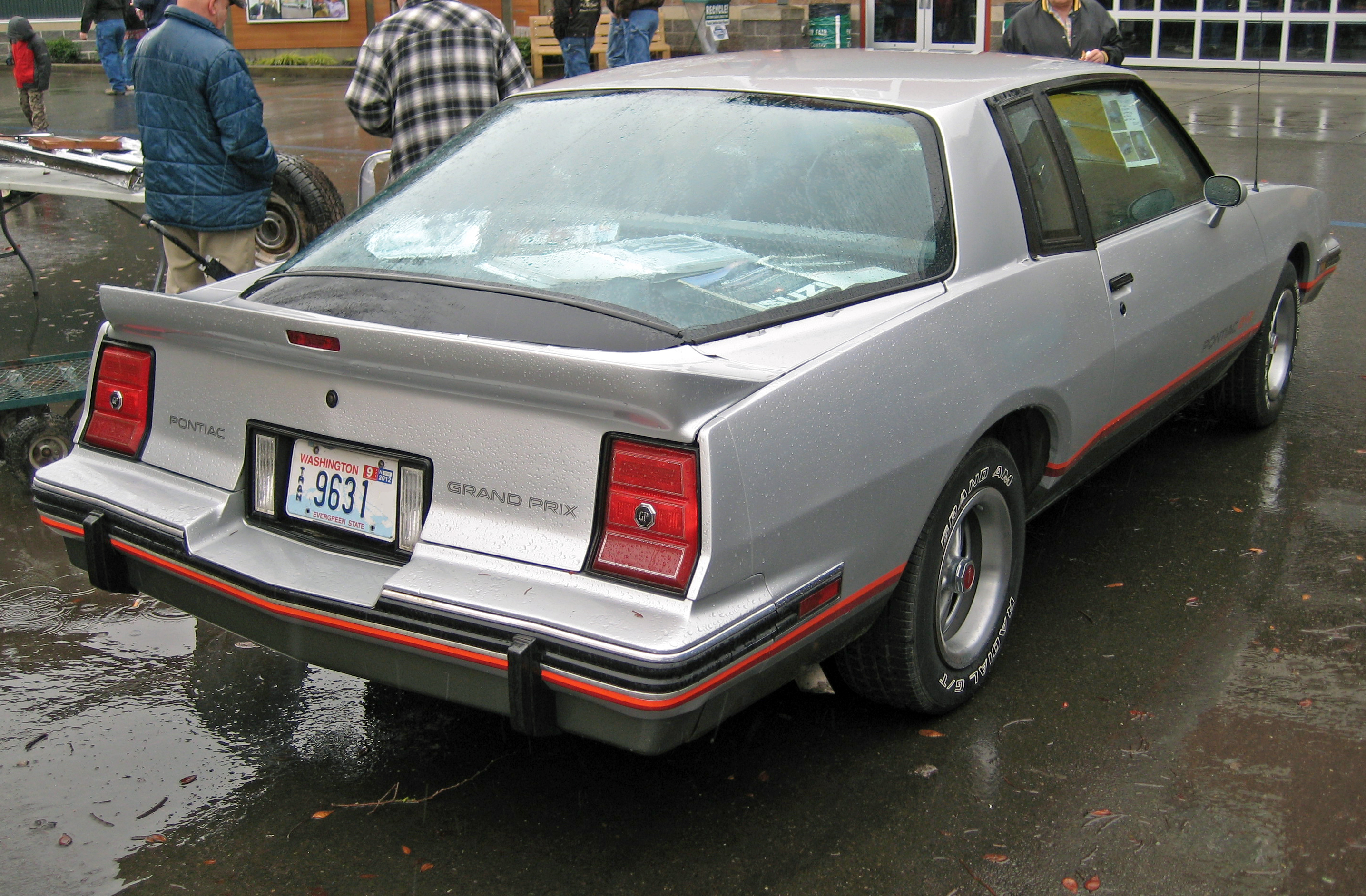
Rear view of 1986 Grand Prix 2+2

An updated taillight design with three sections was the only major change to the 1986 Grand Prix. A new 2+2 model was offered for homologation of an aerodynamic coupe body for NASCAR competition, like Chevrolet's 1986 Monte Carlo SS Aerocoupe. (Pontiac never used the term "Aerocoupe"). The 2+2-specific pieces are an aero nose, bubble rear glass and a fiberglass trunk lid with an integral spoiler. All 2+2 models came equipped with a corporate 305 cu in (5.0 L) four-barrel engine, the 200-4R four-speed automatic transmission and 3.08:1 rear axle ratio. They have a two-tone paint job with silver on top and gray on the bottom, with 2+2 decals and striping and 15x7 steel Rally II wheels. Modestly successful on superspeedways, where its bulbous rear end earned it a nickname of "the whale", the 2+2 design was seriously flawed for street use. Since the enormous rear glass was fixed (not an opening hatch), it forced the adoption of a dramatically shortened trunk opening. Although it had modest horsepower, benign handling, and design compromises, there were only 1,118 Grand Prix 2+2s built in 1986 and dealers were able to ask 20 percent above the list price for this limited-production version. The cars were all allotted to dealers in the Southeastern United States.

While the 3.8 L V6 remained standard for the regular Grand Prix, a fuel-injected 4.3 L Chevrolet 90° V6 was added to the options list for models other than the 2+2. This engine was available with a three-speed or a four-speed automatic transmission.

=== 1987 ===
The 1987 Grand Prix was basically a rerun of the 1986 model aside from the discontinuation of the 2+2 model. The same three models were continued including base, LE, and Brougham. Engine offerings again included the standard Buick 3.8 L V6, the Chevrolet 4.3 L V6, or optional Chevrolet 5.0 L V8.

This would be the last year for the G-body Grand Prix, which would be replaced by the all-new W-body version in 1988. The 1987 model year was also the last Grand Prix to feature a V8 engine (until late-2005), and separate body-on-frame construction.

Pontiac Grand Prix Production Figures
	Yearly Total
1978	228,444
1979	210,050
1980	114,714
1981	147,711
1982	80,367
1983	85,798
1984	77,444
1985	59,783
1986	40,584
1987	16,542
Total	1,061,437

== Sixth generation (1988–1996) ==
Sixth generation
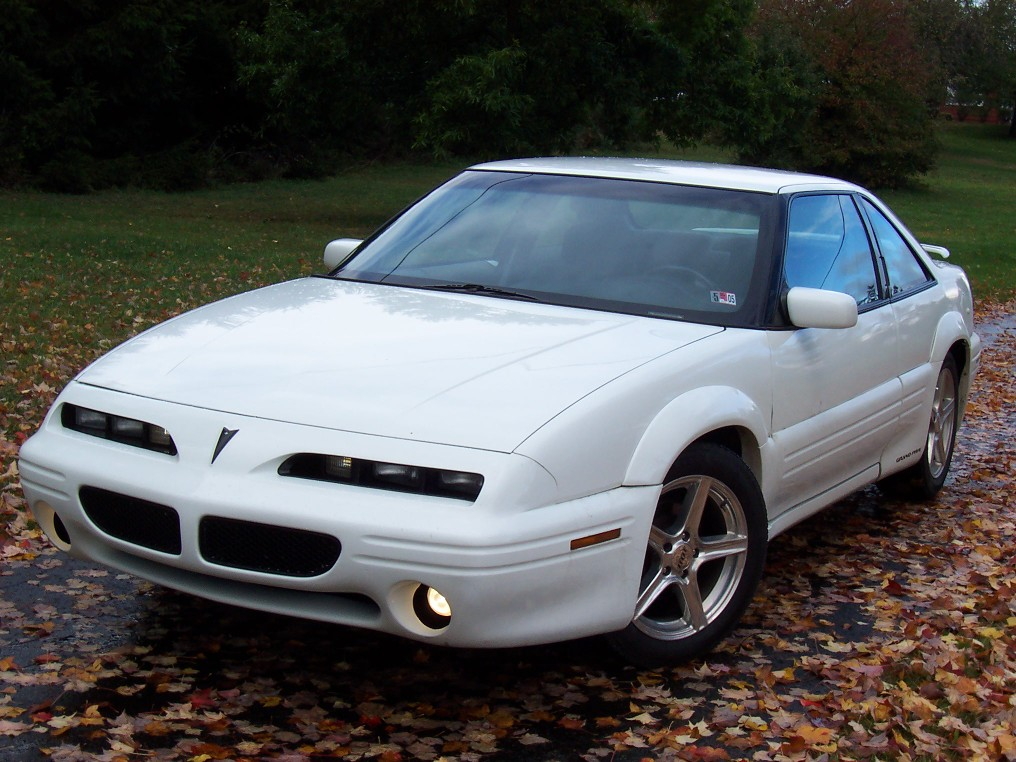
- 1996 Grand Prix

Overview
- Production: October 1987–1996 (coupe); September 12, 1989–1996 (sedan)
- Model years: 1988–1996
- Assembly: United States: Kansas City, Kansas (Fairfax Assembly)

Body and chassis
- Class: Mid-size car
- Body style: 2-door coupe 4-door sedan
- Layout: Transverse front-engine, front-wheel drive
- Platform: W-body 1st Gen
- Related: Buick Regal; Chevrolet Lumina; Oldsmobile Cutlass Supreme

Powertrain
- Engine: 2.3 L LD2 I4; 2.8 L 60° V6; 3.1 L LH0 V6; 3.1 L LG5 V6; 3.1 L L82 V6; 3.4 L LQ1 V6
- Transmission: 3-speed automatic 4-speed automatic 5-speed manual

Dimensions
- Wheelbase: 107.5 in (2,730 mm)
- Length: 1988–89: 193.9 in (4,925 mm); 1990–91: 194.5 in (4,940 mm); 1992–93 Sedan: 194.9 in (4,950 mm); 1992–96 Coupe: 194.8 in (4,948 mm); 1994–96 Sedan: 195.7 in (4,971 mm)
- Width: 71.9 in (1,826 mm); 1994–96 Coupe: 72.1 in (1,831 mm)
- Height: 1988–89: 52.8 in (1,341 mm); 1990–93 Sedan: 54.8 in (1,392 mm); 1990–91 Coupe: 53.3 in (1,354 mm); 1992–93 Coupe: 52.8 in (1,341 mm); 1994–96 Sedan: 56.3 in (1,430 mm); 1994–96 Coupe: 54.6 in (1,387 mm)
- Curb weight: 1990–91 Coupe: 3,550 lb (1,610 kg)

Chronology
- Predecessor: Pontiac Tempest; Pontiac 6000

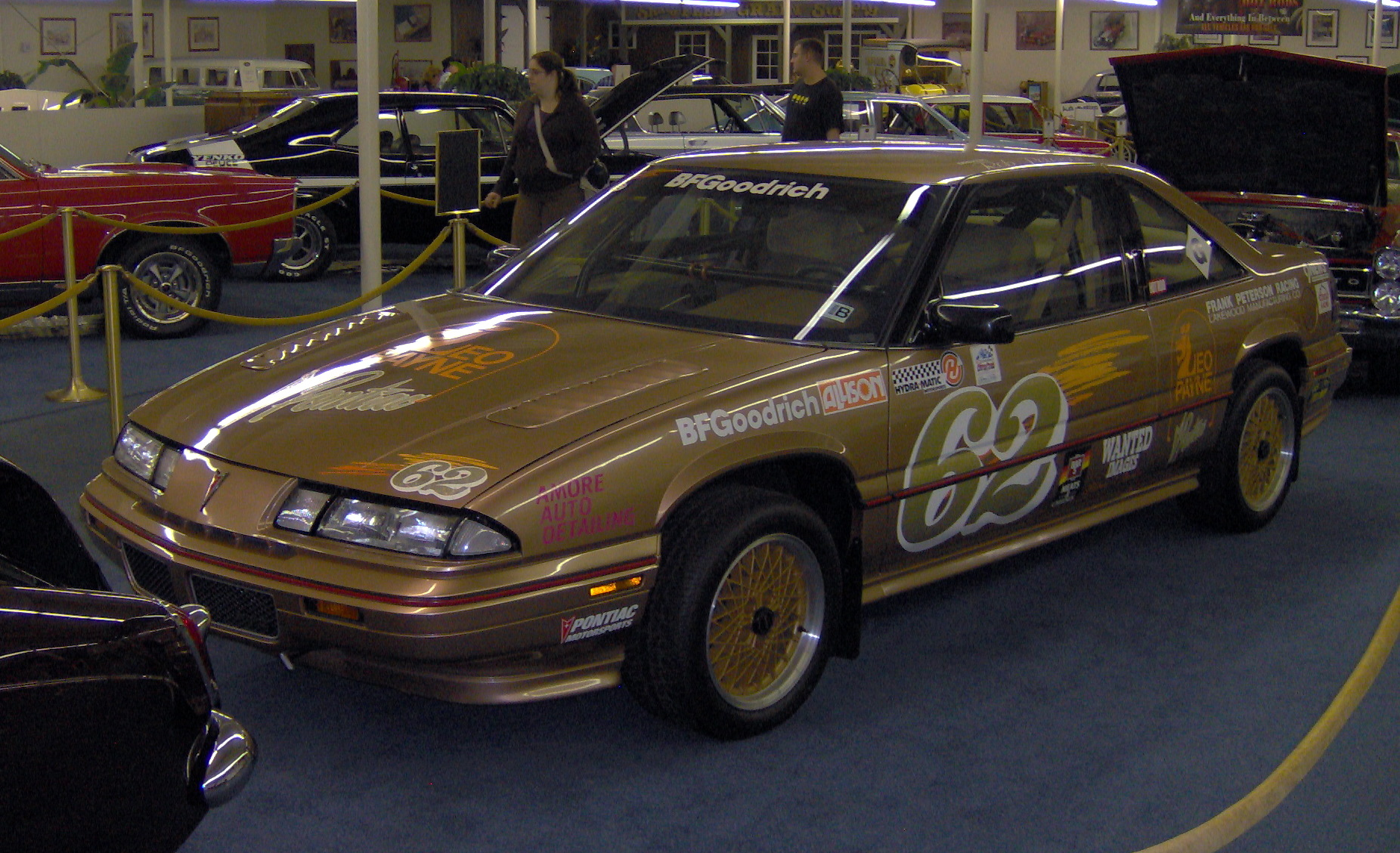
This special 1988 Grand Prix was an experimental turbocharged model. Production models were produced for the 1989 and 1990 model year. The car seen here was raced at Pike's Peak.

The first front-wheel drive W-body Grand Prix coupes were built in October 1987, and released on January 12, 1988, for the 1988 model year. This generation Grand Prix was built in Kansas City, Kansas. The Grand Prix was introduced as base, LE and SE coupes. All featured GM's MPFI 2.8 L V6 that made 130 hp (97 kW) and 170 lb⋅ft (230 N⋅m) of torque. A five-speed manual or four-speed automatic were the transmissions offered. The LE was well equipped with power windows and door locks and a digital dashboard with an analog tachometer. SE models upgraded with power front seats with multiple lumbar, side bolsters, side wing adjustments, an AM/FM Cassette stereo, and a trip computer and compass located in the center of the dash. Some models of this generation have the rare feature of a split front bench seat with a column shifter. Another unique feature only found on the Grand Prix is the combination lock for the glove box, rather than a key. Grand Prix was Motor Trend's Car of the Year for 1988.

=== 1989 ===
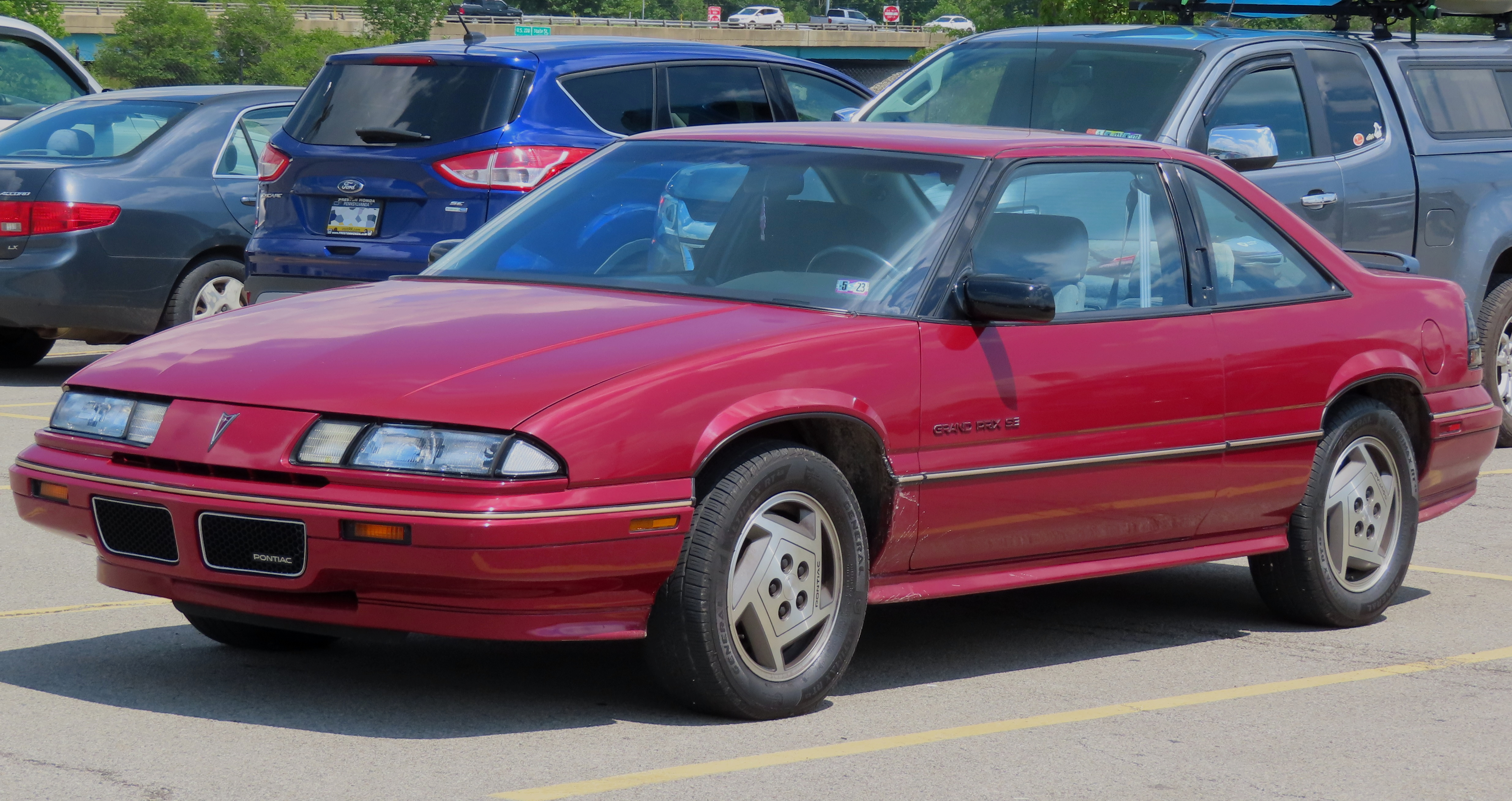
1989 Pontiac Grand Prix SE

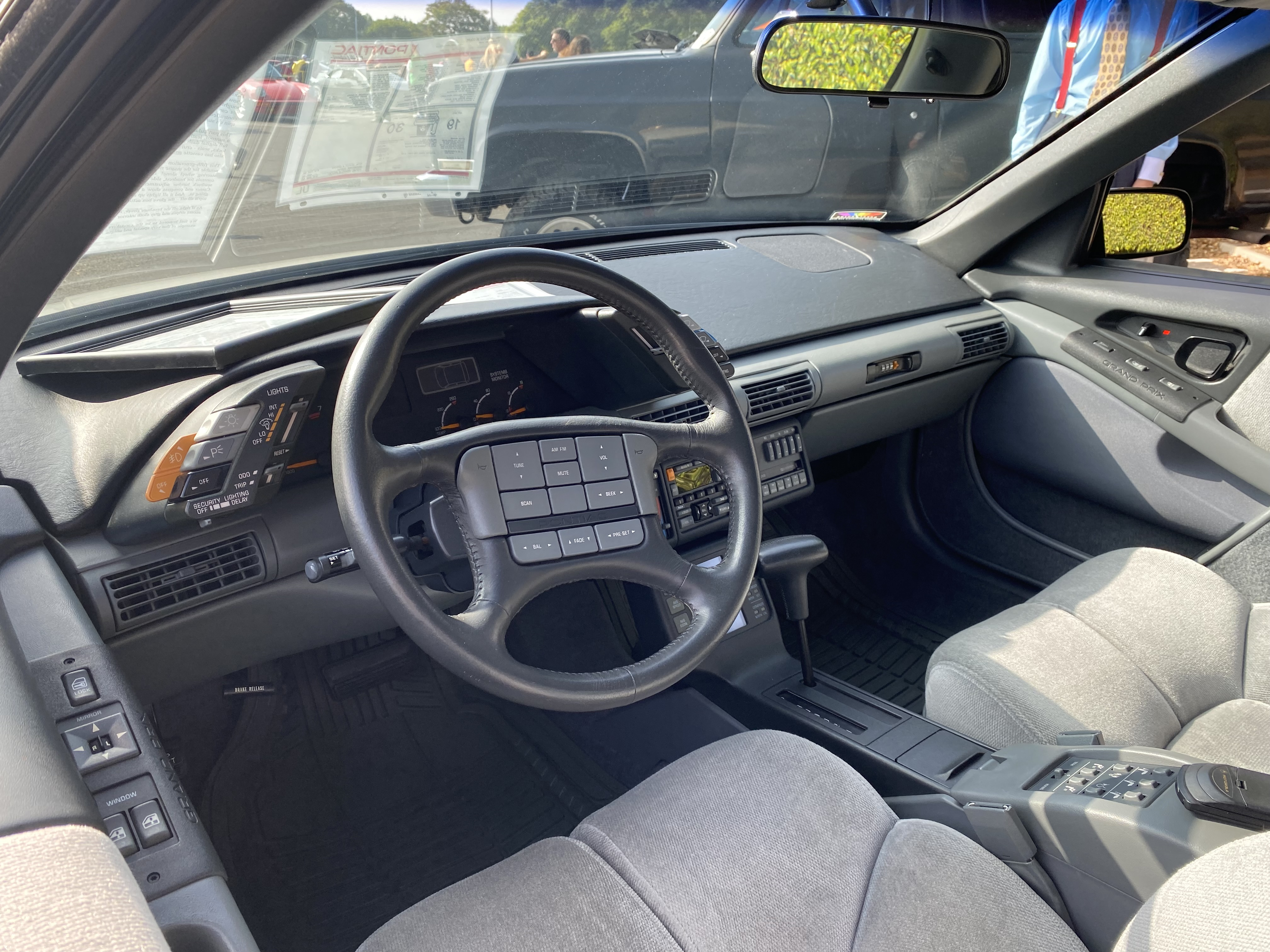
1989 Pontiac Grand Prix SE interior

A host of changes upgraded the Grand Prix for 1989 including for the first time optional anti-lock brakes. Air conditioning was standard as were rear shoulder belts, and the 2.8 L was replaced by GM's new 3.1 L MPFI V6 that produced 140 hp (100 kW) midway through the model year. For 1989, the 3.1 L was only mated to a four-speed automatic transmission, while the remaining 2.8 was mated to either manual or automatic transmissions. The coupe was an SE model with body work such as hood louvers and extra body cladding (which would be the most controversial design element in the years to come). The interior featured more equipment, and only seated four, in contrast to the LE's five seats, which was a revival of the Pontiac 2+2 from the mid-1960s. The full analog gauges would become the 1990-93 sports cluster, and the basis for the new instrument cluster to replace the digital cluster for 1990.

A new trim level was offered for 1989, a limited-edition turbo coupe that featured an ASC/McLaren turbocharged version of GM's 3.1 L V6 (Only 749 were produced). Output was 205 hp (153 kW), 65 more than the previous year. A four-speed automatic was the only transmission offered.

=== 1990 ===
In 1990, the base model was dropped in favor of a sedan version (replacing the 6000 which ended production the next year and the Canada-only Tempest), entering production on September 12, 1989. A notable introduction for the Grand Prix in 1990 is the new STE (Special Touring Edition) which replaced the STE model of the Pontiac 6000. In contrast to that model, it trades in all-wheel-drive for the available Turbo 3.1 L V6. Standard features include a cassette stereo with equalizer and eight speakers (a compact disc player was optional), remote keyless entry, eight-way power driver's seat with multiple lumbar and sidewing adjustments for both front seat occupants, and a compass/trip computer that was more informative than the units in the SE and turbo coupes. An LE sedan was also available for 1990, standard with a 2.3 L Quad 4 engine and a 3-speed automatic, the first use of an inline 4 cylinder engine in a Grand Prix. The 2.8 L V6 engine was discontinued, while the 3.1 L engine gained widespread availability and a standard five-speed manual transmission. The STE sedan also offered a light bar between the halogen headlights that did not function as daytime running lights.

=== 1991 ===
For 1991, the Grand Prix Turbo coupe was replaced by a new GTP version. This model sported a 3.4 L DOHC V6 that produced 210 hp (160 kW) with a five-speed manual transmission or 200 with the optional four-speed automatic. Inside, the GTP was essentially the same as the Turbo. One notable exception was the available optional Heads Up Display only shared with the Cutlass Supreme. The exterior used mini-quad headlamps (along with all other Grand Prix coupes), "GTP Grand Prix" and "24 Valve V6" badges. The STE Turbo was replaced by a 3.4 L STE and could be ordered with the automatic transmission or manual transmission. For the SE coupe, the B4U package featured GTP bodywork and aluminum wheels. An SE sedan also became available and featured STE-like styling at a lower price. The LE coupe was discontinued for 1991.

=== 1992 ===
Anti-lock brakes (ABS) is optional on all models for 1992, the 2.3 L Quad 4 engine was dropped, and the LE sedan gained the SE/STE front lightbar. Most LE Sedans ordered for rental fleets had full power options. A special edition only for 1992 was "Richard Petty Edition" of only 1000 units. This edition featured a special red, white or blue paint, the 210 hp Chevy LQ1 3.4l DOHC, special badging featuring Richard Petty's signature, special wheel well and ground effects, spoiler, Richard Petty black and white center caps, transmission shift modification which allowed a button for 2nd gear start or normal use, combination locking glove box, blue paint on the inner web on wheel matching exterior paint, and "fan appreciation tour" badging making it one of the rarest Grand Prix ever produced.

=== 1993 ===
This was the last year of the old-style B4U bodykit. There was a special edition model with metallic green paint, as well as gold wheels and pinstriping. It was also the last year that a manual transmission could be ordered as an option. This was also the last year for the style of the dashboard used 1988–1993.

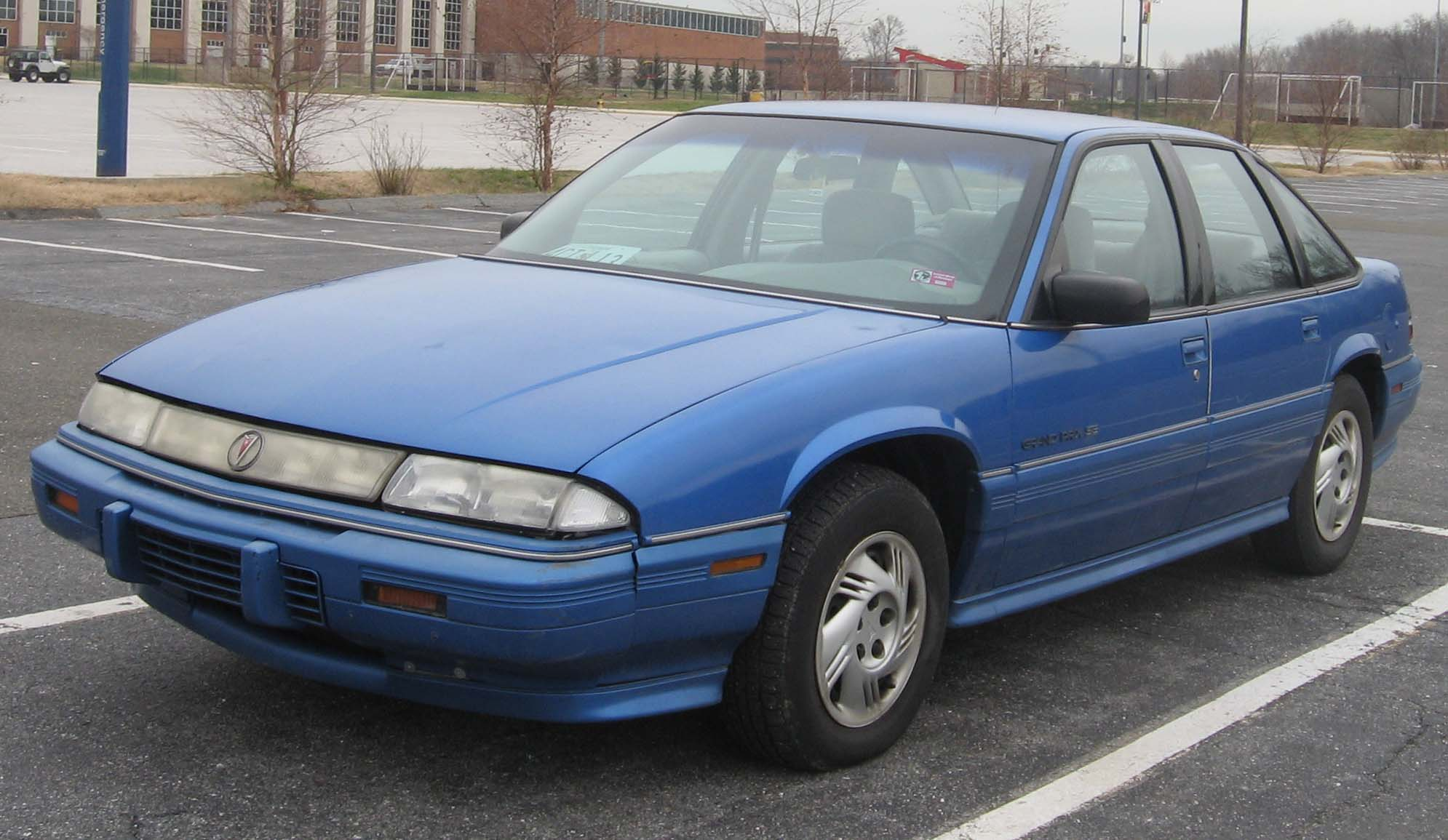
Pontiac Grand Prix sedan

=== 1994 ===
For 1994, Grand Prix went through a mid-generation "facelift" inside and out, as well as a reshuffling of the lineup. First, LE and STE models were discontinued. The GT and GTP became option packages on the SE sedan and coupe, respectively. These option packages included the revised 3.4 L V6, sport suspension, ground effects. Outside, there was a new front and rear fascia and new ground effects. Inside, a new instrument panel hosted dual airbags, much larger and easier to use controls, and seatbelts were moved to the B-pillars rather than the doors on sedans only; coupes retained the automatic seatbelt design. Under the hood, the 3.1 L V6 was changed to the 3100 SFI V6 with 160 hp (120 kW), while the 3.4 L V6 had 210 hp (160 kW). The Grand Prix Sedan also had a slight tail light revision using the amber over red pattern as opposed to the red over amber in years past; however, the coupe's tail lights remained the same. Mirrors on some models were painted in body color.

=== 1995-1996 ===
For 1996 the center console on floor shift models received a minor redesign. This was also the last year for the BYP body cladding package. The 3.4 L DOHC V6 gained 5 hp (3.7 kW) with intake and exhaust improvements. All Grand Prix coupes received a sport package with five-spoke alloy wheels and dual exhaust. This is the last year for the sixth-generation Grand Prix and this is the last year for the 6th generation mid-sized Grand Prix sedan.

Pontiac Grand Prix Production Figures
	Yearly Total
1988	86,357
1989	136,747
1990	128,067
1991	114,718
1992	106,583
1993	106,083
1994	148,405
1995	131,835
1996	77,180
Total	1,035,975

== Seventh generation (1997–2003) ==
Seventh generation
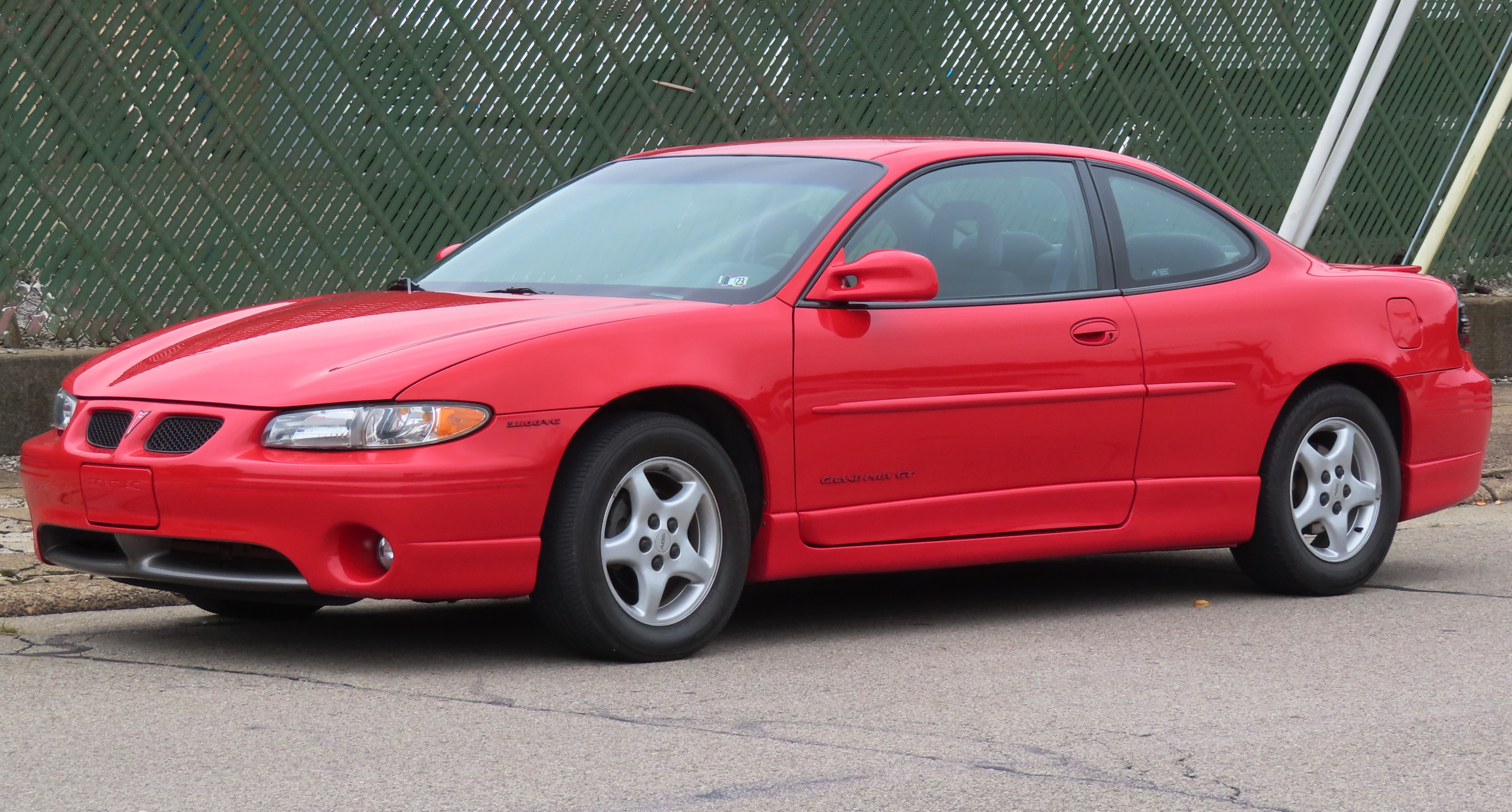

Overview
- Production: August 1996 – February 2003
- Model years: 1997–2003
- Assembly: United States: Kansas City, Kansas (Fairfax Assembly)
- Designer: John Manoogian II; Tom Kearns (1993)

Body and chassis
- Class: Mid-size car
- Body style: 2-door coupe 4-door sedan
- Layout: Transverse front-engine, front-wheel drive
- Platform: W-body 2nd Gen
- Related: Buick Century; Buick Regal; Chevrolet Impala; Chevrolet Monte Carlo; Oldsmobile Intrigue

Powertrain
- Engine: 3.1 L L82 V6 - 160 Horsepower; 3.1 L LG8 V6 - 175 Horsepower; 3.8 L L36 V6 - 195-200 Horsepower; 3.8 L L67 SC V6 - 240 Horsepower
- Transmission: 4-speed 4T60-E automatic 4-speed 4T65-E automatic 4-speed 4T65E-HD automatic

Dimensions
- Wheelbase: 110.5 in (2,807 mm)
- Length: 196.5 in (4,991 mm); 2001–02 Coupe: 197.5 in (5,016 mm)
- Width: 72.7 in (1,847 mm)
- Height: 54.7 in (1,389 mm)
- Curb weight: Coupe: 3,396 lb (1,540 kg); Sedan: 3,414 lb (1,549 kg)

Chronology
- Successor: Pontiac GTO (Grand Prix coupe)

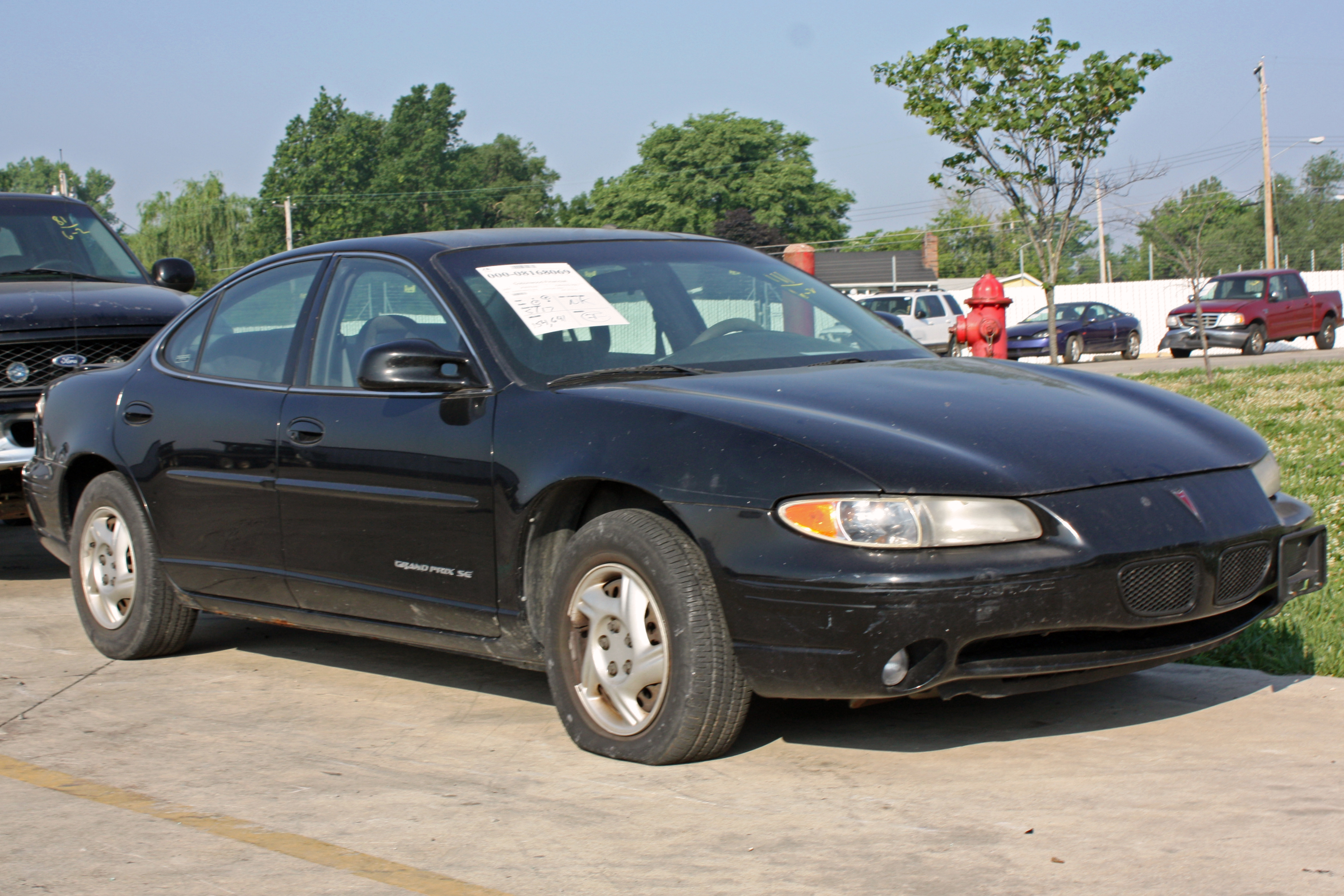
1997 Pontiac Grand Prix SE Sedan

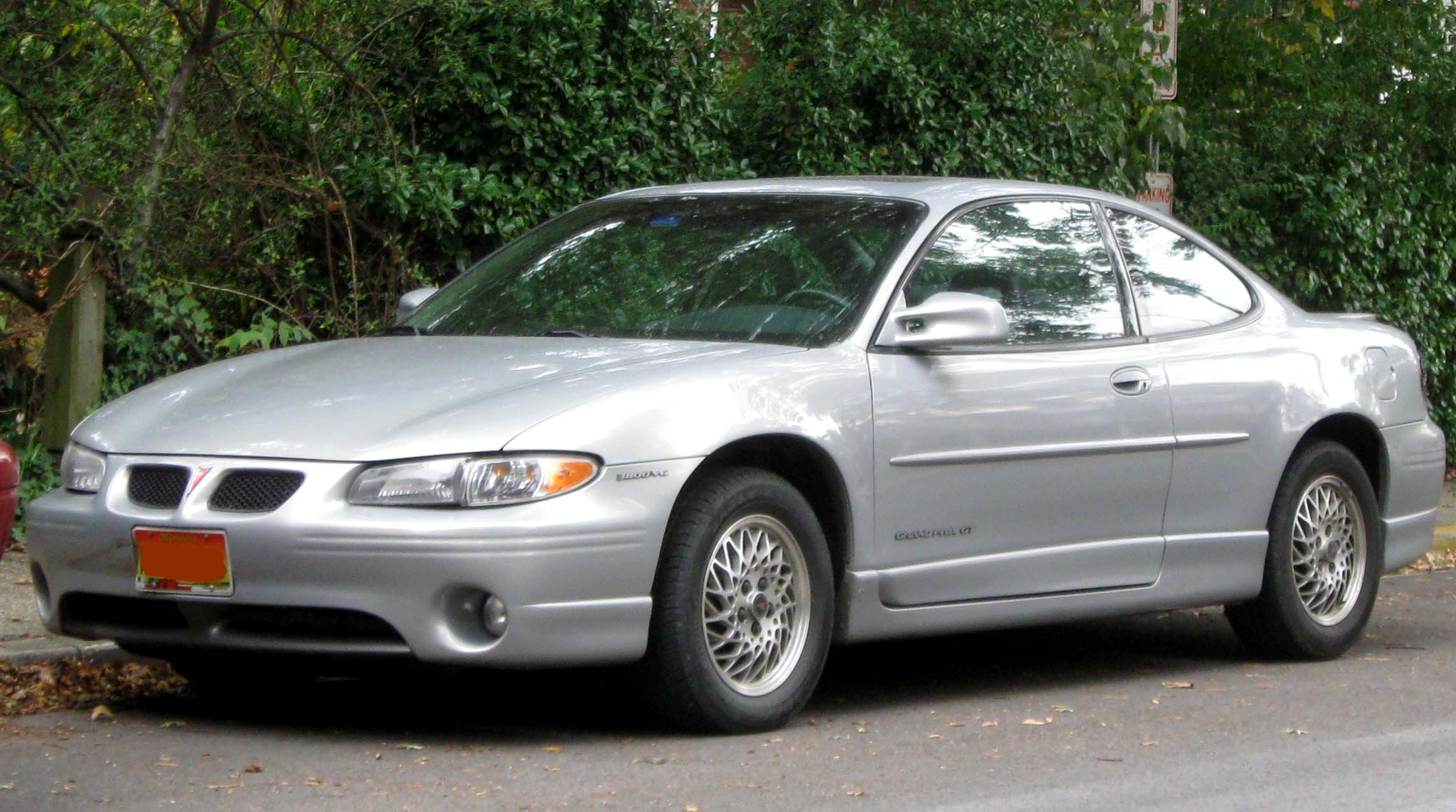
Pontiac Grand Prix GT coupe

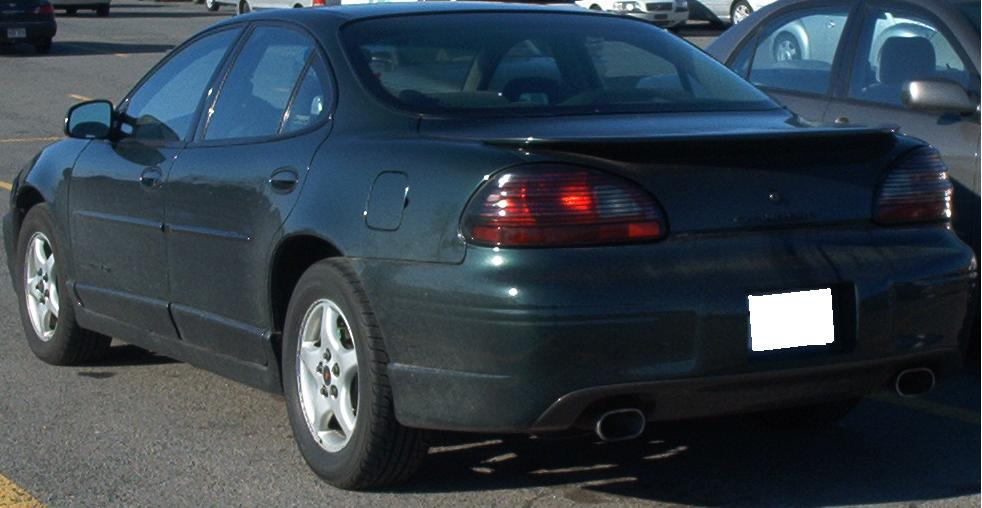
Grand Prix Sedan (1997-2003) Rear View

In 1990, work began on a redesigned Grand Prix alongside other W-body cars under design chief John Manoogian II. By 1993, a final design was approved and show concept developed during the latter half of 1994. On January 4, 1995, General Motors unveiled the 300 GPX Concept at the 1995 Detroit Auto Show in Detroit. This was a near-exact preview of a redesign for the Grand Prix, due within the 1996 calendar year. In January 1996, the 1997 Grand Prix was unveiled at the Detroit Auto Show. Promoted for its "wide track" appearance and racy styling, this second-generation W-body Grand Prix sold well.

On the YouTube Rare Classic Cars & Automotive History channel, Manoogian conducted a number of interviews about his and his team's seminal idea for the seventh generation Grand Prix: "a Learjet for the ground." They proposed a coupé, but also a sedan that would straddle aspects of a coupé, sacrificing the more "upright, wear your hat utility" of a traditional sedan — for the sleekness of a coupé. Responding to Pontiac's marketing credo, We Build Excitement, Manoogian felt the idea would be well received and was able to convince his management, decades before numerous prominent examples of four-door coupés arrived on the market, namely the Volkswagen CC and Volkswagen Arteon and Mercedes CLA.

=== Stolen photos ===
John Manoogian has related that during the Grand Prix's design process, photographs of the initial clay model were stolen and sold (for $40,000, in 1990) to the Detroit Free Press, Autoweek, Car and Driver and Automobile magazine — the latter using the photos as the basis for the magazine's July 1990 cover rendering. Time magazine carried the story when General Motors offered a $30,000 (in 1990) reward for information leading to the identification of the person who stole the photos. The photo technician, a temporary contract employee for the GM Photographic Lab, attempted first to collect the reward by contacting GM's security chief, calling back three days later, increasing the demand to $60,000 and then $75,000, saying a foreign car maker was interested. The extortion plot triggered FBI involvement, who were able to track and arrest the technician from phone records. GM was able to demonstrate that the publication of the photographs caused the company hundreds of millions in damages. The technician, Gregory Charles Hooper, faced five years in prison, and received a fourteen months jail sentence. The technician had tried to sell an original cache of 20 stolen photographs, including shots of the forthcoming Buick Skylark, Chevrolet Blazer, Saturn SC, Pontiac Bonneville, Chevrolet Camaro and Pontiac Firebird — he had stolen more than 100 photographs. Authorities called it one of the "nation's costliest industrial espionage cases and the first federal criminal case of its kind to face the Big Three Automakers."

=== Production and annual changes ===
Production began on August 12, 1996. There were two trim levels available from 1996; the SE and GT. The base SE was only available as a sedan, while the sportier GT came in both coupe and sedan forms. The GTP trim package was available for GT models in either body style. Coupes and sedans shared similar styling, except for rear doors and quarter panels. The base 3.1 L v6 engine on the SE was the only engine carried over from the previous generation. The GT 3.4 L V6 was replaced by a Buick 3.8 L V6. This engine, in 3800 Series II form, was an option on the SE with 195 horsepower. The 3800 Series II was on the Ward's 10 Best Engines list for 1995–1997. Replacing the Chevy LQ1 3.4 L DOHC V6, an Eaton M90 supercharger option was available on the 3.8 L from 1997 to 2003 (also used in the 1996–2003 Bonneville), with compression ratio decreased from 9.3 to 8.5, boosted horsepower to 240. GTP interior trim level featured a "performance shift" button on the shifter that raised the transmission shift points. Front bucket seats came standard, while a 45/55 split-bench seat was available as an option on the SE sedan only.

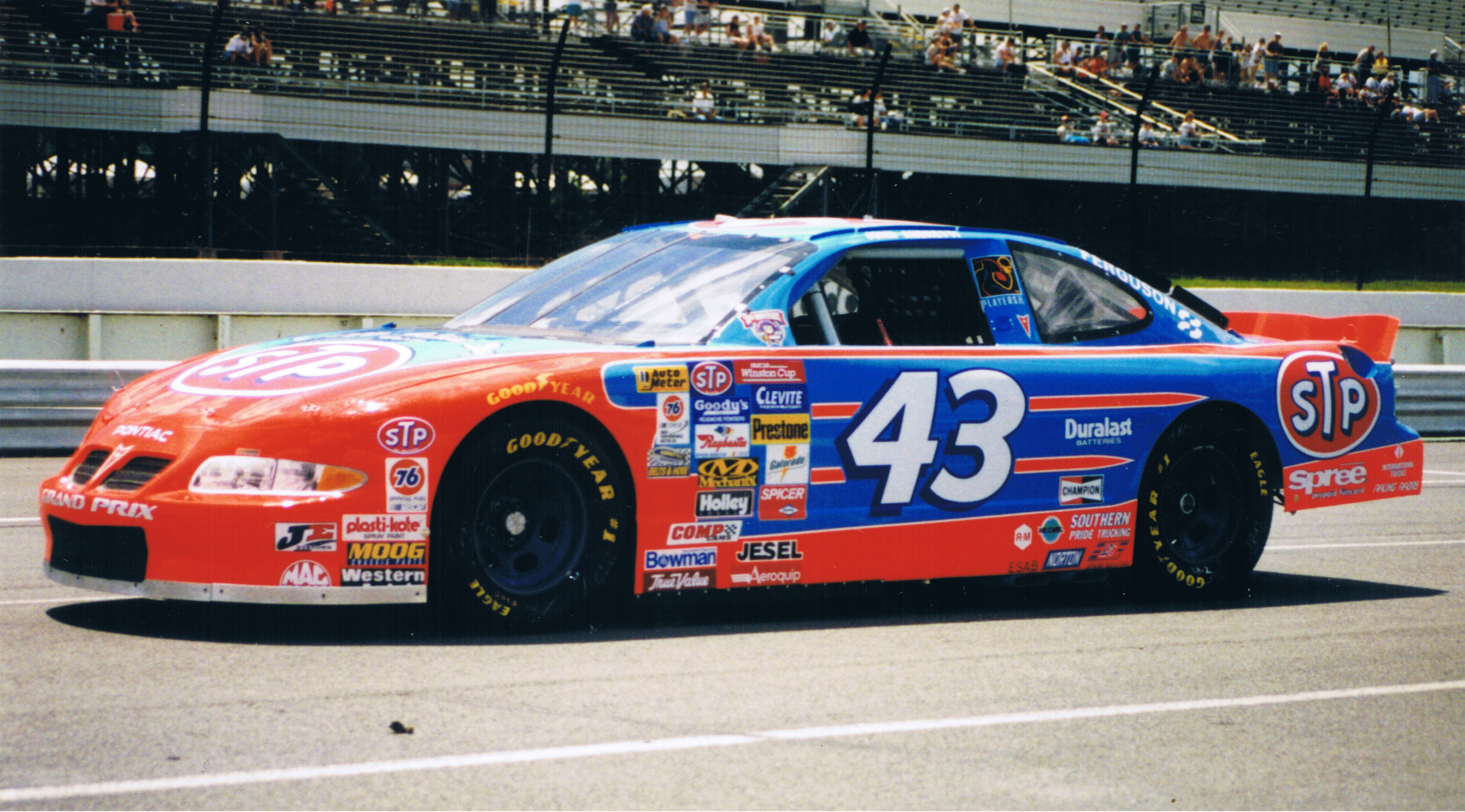
Pontiac supplied Grand Prix sheetmetal and engine parts to Petty Enterprises for years to field their #43 race car; this car was driven by John Andretti at the 1998 Pocono 500.

1998: Few changes occurred this year, except that traction control now was available with the supercharged engine. Airbags were designed to deploy with reduced force. The tire-pressure monitor was dropped. Also on models equipped with 3.8L N/A powerplants (VIN K), the 4T65E 4-speed automatic transmission was used in favor of the 4T60E previously used. To add some excitement, Pontiac also launched a special pace car model. This model celebrated the 40th running of the Daytona 500 on February 15, 1998. The pace-car replicas had special Medium Gulf Blue Metallic paint, unique "Sparkle Silver" 16-inch torque star aluminum wheels, custom decaling, a plaque notating the specific model number and custom door panels. Also standard was a head-up display that projected the speed onto the windshield. A total 1,500 were produced, of which 200 were equipped with sunroofs.

1999: Detail changes marked the 1999 editions of Pontiac's midsize coupe and sedan. New wheel choices were the main visual change this year. The non-supercharged 3800 Series V6 engine gained 5 horsepower (now 200). This was also the last year that the SE model had the optional non-supercharged 3800 V6. GT models received a standard rear spoiler this year. GTP, previously a performance option for GT models, was now a stand-alone model in both coupe and sedan form. The coolant overflow reservoir was relocated from being in front of the intake box to being mounted to the passenger strut tower. Available 16 in (41 cm) alloy wheels came in a new 5-spoke design. The one new option was a Bose 8-speaker audio system.

2000: The standard 3.1 L V6, installed in SE models, gained 15 horsepower (now 175) it also gained 10lb⋅ft (now 195). New standard equipment included rear child-seat anchors and an anti-theft system that disabled the starter unless the proper ignition key was used. Pontiac also launched a Daytona 500 pace-car replica, with silver paint, unique 16 in (41 cm) aluminum wheels, functional hood vents, a NASCAR-inspired decklid spoiler, polished quad exhaust tips, and Daytona decals. Only 2,000 were planned.

2001:

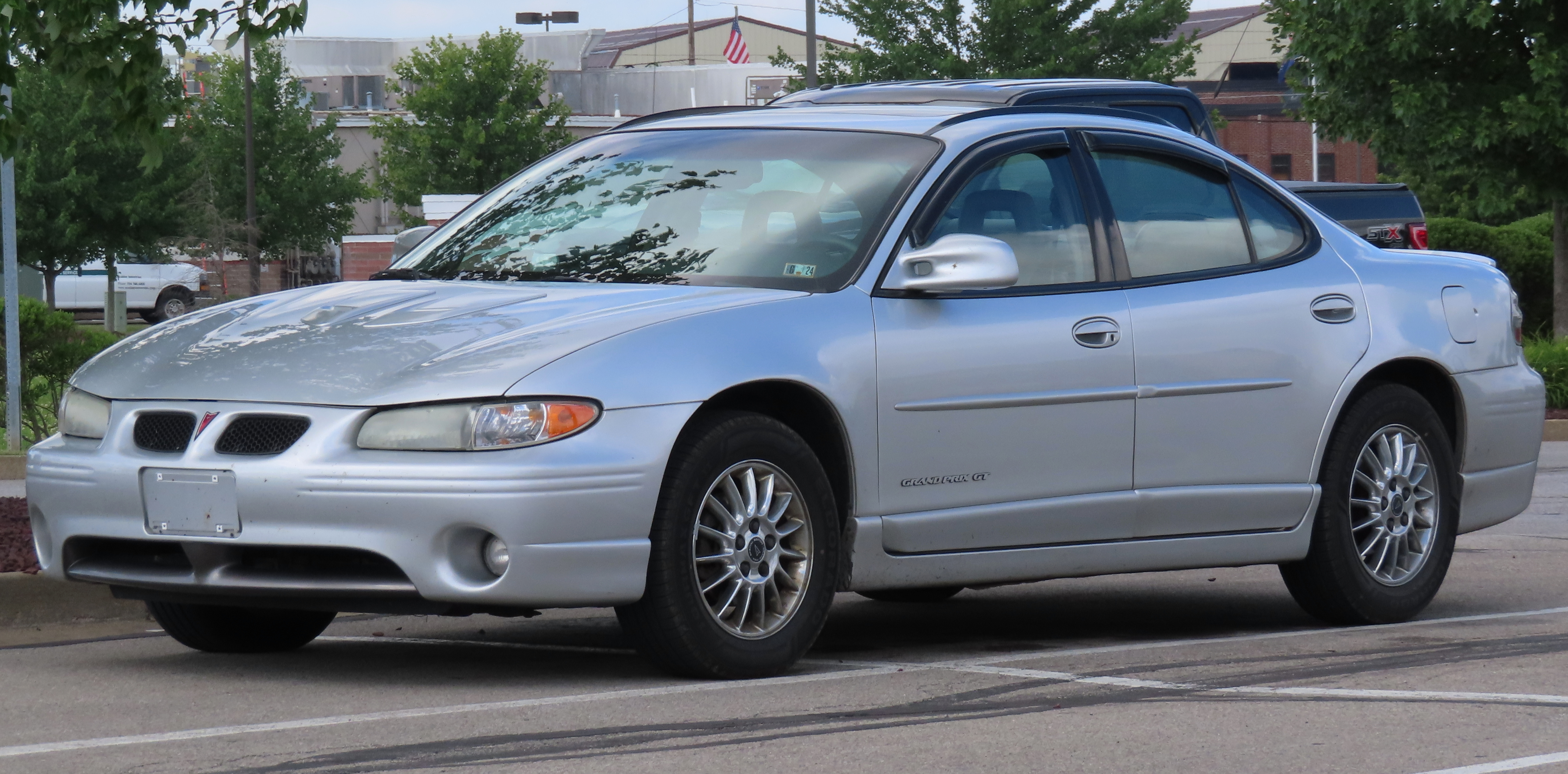
2001 Pontiac Grand Prix GT Special Edition sedan

OnStar, formerly unavailable on the Grand Prix, was made standard on GTP, optional on GT. The SE got revised frontal styling in the form of the GT and GTP front bumper cover in place of the older SE-specific front fascia, standard rear spoiler, and in-trunk emergency release; manual dual-zone climate-control replaced the optional electronic automatic unit previously offered. A Special Edition Package was added this year that could be applied to the GT and GTP models. This package adds the NASCAR-inspired rear spoiler and roof fences, hood-mounted heat extractors, and polished dual-outlet exhaust tips previously offered on the 2000 Pace Car Replica and also adds a two-tone interior, 15-spoke chrome wheels, and the requisite badging. Also available for 2001 were two dealer-installed "75th Anniversary" emblems, to celebrate Pontiac's 75th anniversary, they were placed in front of the badging on each door. A new, yet not very noticed feature for 2001 was added rear strut tower "liners". This prevented common rust of the rear strut towers of the 1997-2000 models.

2002: New for 2002 was a $2,695 40th Anniversary option package which included the NASCAR-inspired rear spoiler and roof fences, polished dual-outlet exhaust tips, hood with heat extractors, and 15-spoke chrome wheels previously offered with the 2001 Special Edition package. Unique elements such as the Dark Cherry Metallic paint, 40th Anniversary badges, and Ruby Red and Graphite interior trim with the 40th Anniversary logo embroidered on the front seats and floormats differentiated this option package from the previous year's offering.

One 40th Anniversary Sedan was further customized with a lowering package, different wheels, and exhaust for SEMA and featured in Hot Rod Magazine as the GP40. The lowering package, provided by GM Accessories, consisted of new front and rear adjustable springs, adjustable front and rear dampers and 17 in (43 cm) Z-rated tires mounted on forged aluminum wheels. GM Accessories also provided performance brake pads, drilled and slotted brake rotors (front and rear), a cat-back exhaust system, and a low-restriction air filter. The SE gained standard cruise control and dual-zone climate control, and GTs got a standard power driver's seat and CD player. This was the last year of the two-door coupe. The SE model can be identified by a single exhaust pipe and different rear bumper cover. OnStar was now included standard on the GTP.

2003: Pontiac dropped the coupe version (2-door) for 2003 and made anti-lock brakes and traction control optional instead of standard on most of the remaining sedans. The Limited Edition option package was offered for GT and GTP models made this year. This optional package consisted of unique blue-tinted glass fog light lenses, "Limited Edition" badging, carbon fiber instrument cluster, two-tone cloth/leather interior, and a raised spoiler resembling the original GT/GTP/SE spoiler set atop three aerodynamic pillars. Production ceased in February 2003 and was the last GM car to have an analog odometer.

=== Safety ratings ===
The Insurance Institute for Highway Safety (IIHS) gives the 1997–2003 Grand Prix an Acceptable overall score for their frontal impact test.

=== Recalls ===
In March 2008, GM announced a recall on all 1997–2003 Grand Prix GTP models (as well as sister car Buick Regal GS) due to a problem that causes fires in the engine compartment. Over 230 fires were reported. This recall affected over 200,000 vehicles equipped with the supercharged 3800 Series II engine. GM sent a letter to the owners of these vehicles on March 13, 2008, instructing them not to park in garages or carports until the problem was resolved. The recall for the Supercharged engine involved changing the left (front) valve cover gasket, as oil leaks onto the exhaust manifold may cause engine fires. Some believed this recall did not fix the fire problem, and instead the problem is likely faulty fuel rail quick disconnect o-rings. There have been reports of fires happening after the recall repair had been performed.

In April 2009, the recall already posted for the Supercharged iterations of the 3800 Series II was expanded to cover all 3800 Series II engine-equipped vehicles after many fires were reported with Grand Prix GT and 3.8 L equipped SE versions, as well as the sister car Buick Regal LS. The recall for the non-supercharged V6 was to remove the front spark plug retainer and a valve cover gasket is not changed on non-supercharged 3.8 engines. The recall covered nearly 1.5 million vehicles.

In October 2015, GM announced a third recall for the 3800 V6 engines (RPO L26, L32, L36, and L67). This recall covers nearly 1.4 million vehicles including the 1997-2004 Pontiac Grand Prix. As of October 27, 2015, there is no remedy for this recall.

=== OnStar Dysfunctionality ===
As of May 2008, Grand Prixes from the model years of 01-03 that were outfitted with OnStar cannot be activated due to outdated technology. OnStar's wireless services are provided by Verizon Wireless, which switched fully to digital cellular communications. Grand Prixes of model years 2001 to 2002 have OnStar systems that are Analog cellular capable only. Some 2003 models may have had modules that could be upgraded to digital-ready.

== Eighth generation (2004–2008) ==
Eighth generation
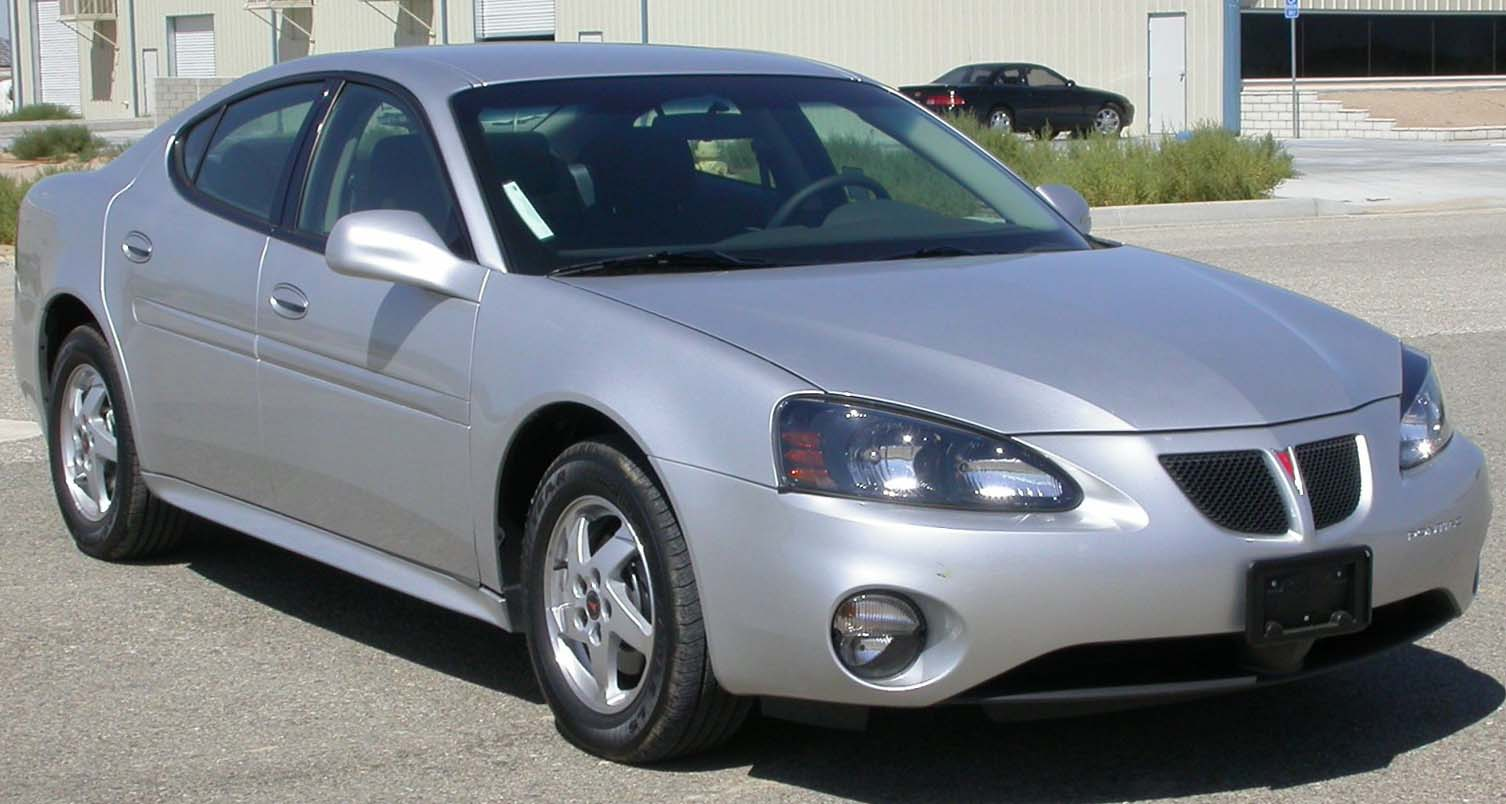
- 2004 Grand Prix

Overview
- Production: January 2, 2003 – April 24, 2008
- Model years: 2004–2008
- Assembly: Oshawa, Ontario, Canada (Oshawa Car Assembly)
- Designer: John Manoogian II (2000)

Body and chassis
- Class: Mid-size car
- Body style: 4-door sedan
- Layout: Transverse front-engine, front-wheel drive
- Platform: W-body 3rd Gen/GMX367
- Related: Buick LaCrosse/Allure; Chevrolet Impala; Chevrolet Monte Carlo

Powertrain
- Engine: 3.8 L L26 V6 - 200 Horsepower; 3.8 L L32 SC V6 - 260 Horsepower; 5.3 L LS4 V8 - 303 Horsepower
- Transmission: 4-speed automatic

Dimensions
- Wheelbase: 110.5 in (2,807 mm)
- Length: 198.3 in (5,037 mm); GTP: 198.2 in (5,034 mm)
- Width: 71.6 in (1,819 mm)
- Height: 55.9 in (1,420 mm)

Chronology
- Successor: Pontiac G8

The Grand Prix was updated for 2004 using a revised version of the GM W platform and was unveiled at the 2002 Chicago Auto Show on February 7, 2002, as the Grand Prix G-Force Concept. The series production version was unveiled at the Los Angeles International Auto Show on January 3, 2003. The Grand Prix came in four different option groups; GT1, GT2, GTP, and GTP Comp-G ("Competition Group").

The GT1 and GT2 use the Series III 3800 V6 engine, rated at 200 hp (150 kW) and 230 lb·ft (310 Nm) of torque, while both GTPs have the supercharged (Eaton Gen 5 Supercharger) 3800 Series III V6 engine with 260 hp (195 kW) and 280 lb·ft (380 Nm) of torque.

A Competition Group (Comp-G) package was available for the GTP that included red painted brake calipers (same brakes as the 'standard' GTP), sport tuned suspension, head-up display (also in GT2 model), 4-speed automatic transmission with paddle-style TAPShift, StabiliTrak dynamic control system, 3.29 axle ratio, performance tires and Magnasteer II. Also, a 10-spoke lightweight wheel was standard with the Comp-G package but could be 'upgraded' to the GTP optional wheel.

The newly redesigned model received mostly positive reviews from critics regarding its styling, performance, and reliability. Commencing with this generation, the 2-door coupe version of the Grand Prix was no longer available. This coincided with GM's reintroduction of the 2-door Pontiac GTO. The Grand Prix was offered with an optional head-up display.

A 2004 Pontiac Grand Prix GT2 "Special Edition" was also offered in very limited supply, this model included special chrome spoke wheels, heated leather seats, the Monsoon sound system, and the head-up display. This Special Edition has the Pontiac SE name badging on the side of the car just behind the front wheels.

=== 2005 ===
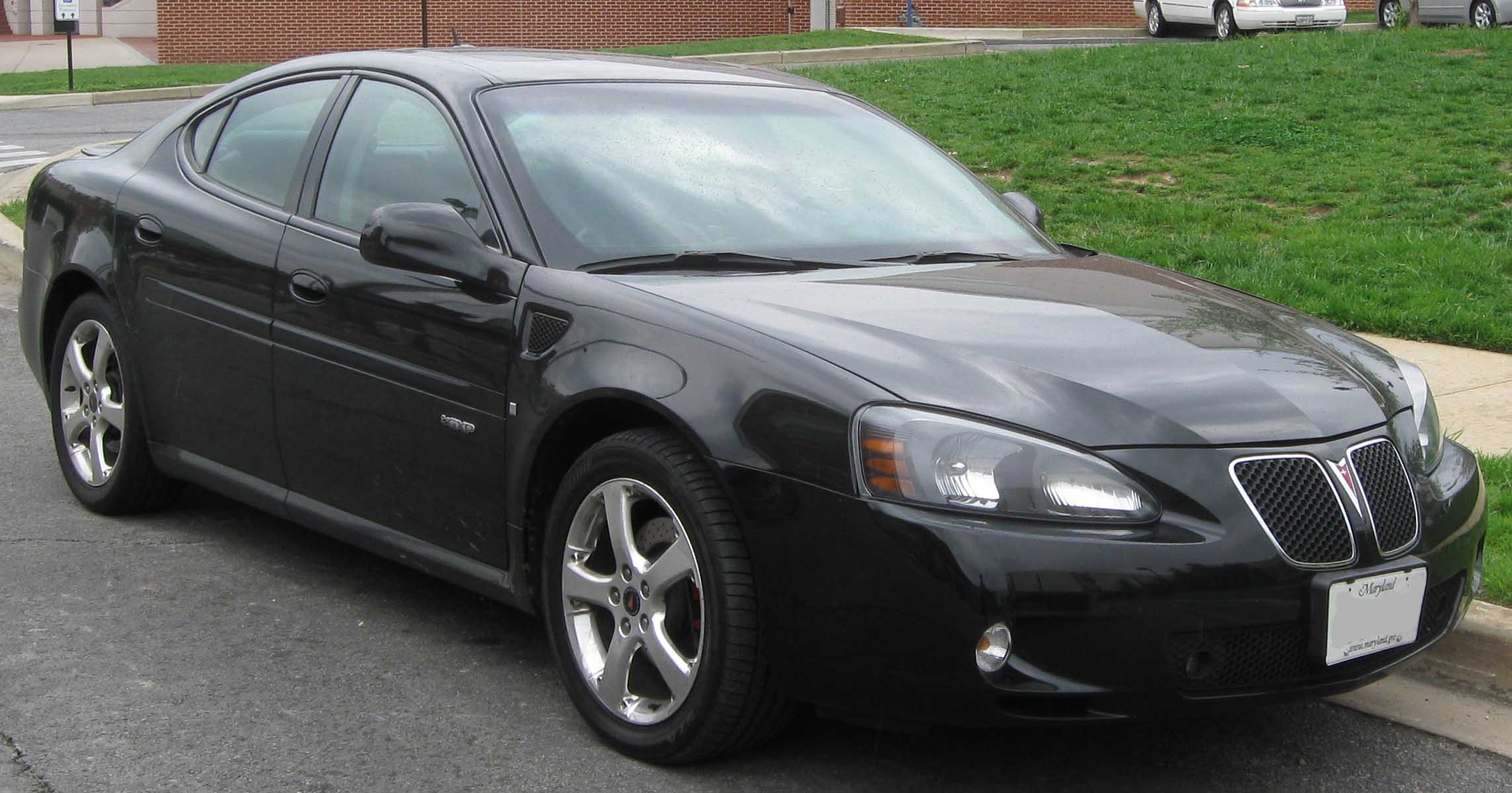
2005 Pontiac Grand Prix GXP

The Grand Prix remained basically unchanged from 2004, with the GT, GTP, and the new GXP. The GT had the naturally aspirated 3.8 L V6, with the GTP having the 3.8 L V6 with supercharger. The Comp-G package was still available for the GTP with an added door emblem denoting the Comp-G package. When the GXP debuted later in the 2005 model year, the Competition Group was dropped, but several features were retained in a Sport package available on the GTP for the rest of that model year.

The GXP used the LS4 V8, a 5.3 L Displacement on Demand (active fuel management) engine based on the LS1 block. Output of this version is 303 hp (226 kW)/323 lb·ft (438 N·m). It used a shortened crankshaft, and a host of other modifications allowing it to fit the front-wheel-drive platform. The GXP also used a 4-speed automatic transmission with paddle-style TAPshift, head-up display, vented cross drilled brakes with PBR calipers, performance tuned suspension with Bilstein gas-charged struts (sits about 9 mm (0.4 in) lower than other GP models), Magnasteer II, and StabiliTrak dynamic control system. Also, the DIC displayed G-Force (maximum achieved for lateral, acceleration, and deceleration) information when the car is not moving. Cosmetically, the GXP differed from the other models with revised bodywork including a different front clip, wheel well cooling vents on the front fenders, a different rear bumper, and twin-dual polished exhaust. The Grand Prix GXP also offer different-width 18 in (46 cm) polished Alcoa forged aluminum wheels: the front wheels are 8 in (200 mm) wide, and the rear wheels are 7 in (180 mm) wide.

=== 2006 ===
For 2006, a Special Edition body package featured a body-colored SPO grille, new front and rear "diffuser" type bumpers, lower side skirts, and wheels. The three options were the Grand Prix, powered by the 3800 Series III V6, the GT, now powered by the 3800 Series III Supercharged V6, and the GXP, powered by the LS4 V8. The GTP designation was discontinued from the Grand Prix line and applied as the top trim of the G6. All General Motors 3.8 L Buick V6 powered cars become the first SULEV compliant vehicles. Chrome trim was added to the interiors of the GXP models.

=== 2007 ===
For the 2007 model year the lineup remained the Base, GT, and GXP models. Also, the Displacement on Demand displacement management system (on GXP 5.3 L V8s) was renamed Active Fuel Management, while the GXP trim included a 303 hp (226 kW) V8 engine with a firmer suspension, performance tires, heated leather seats, a head-up display, and 18-inch (460 mm) wheels. That model year marked the car's final revision until the Grand Prix was pulled from Pontiac's lineup after 2008, by adding GM badges near the front doors.

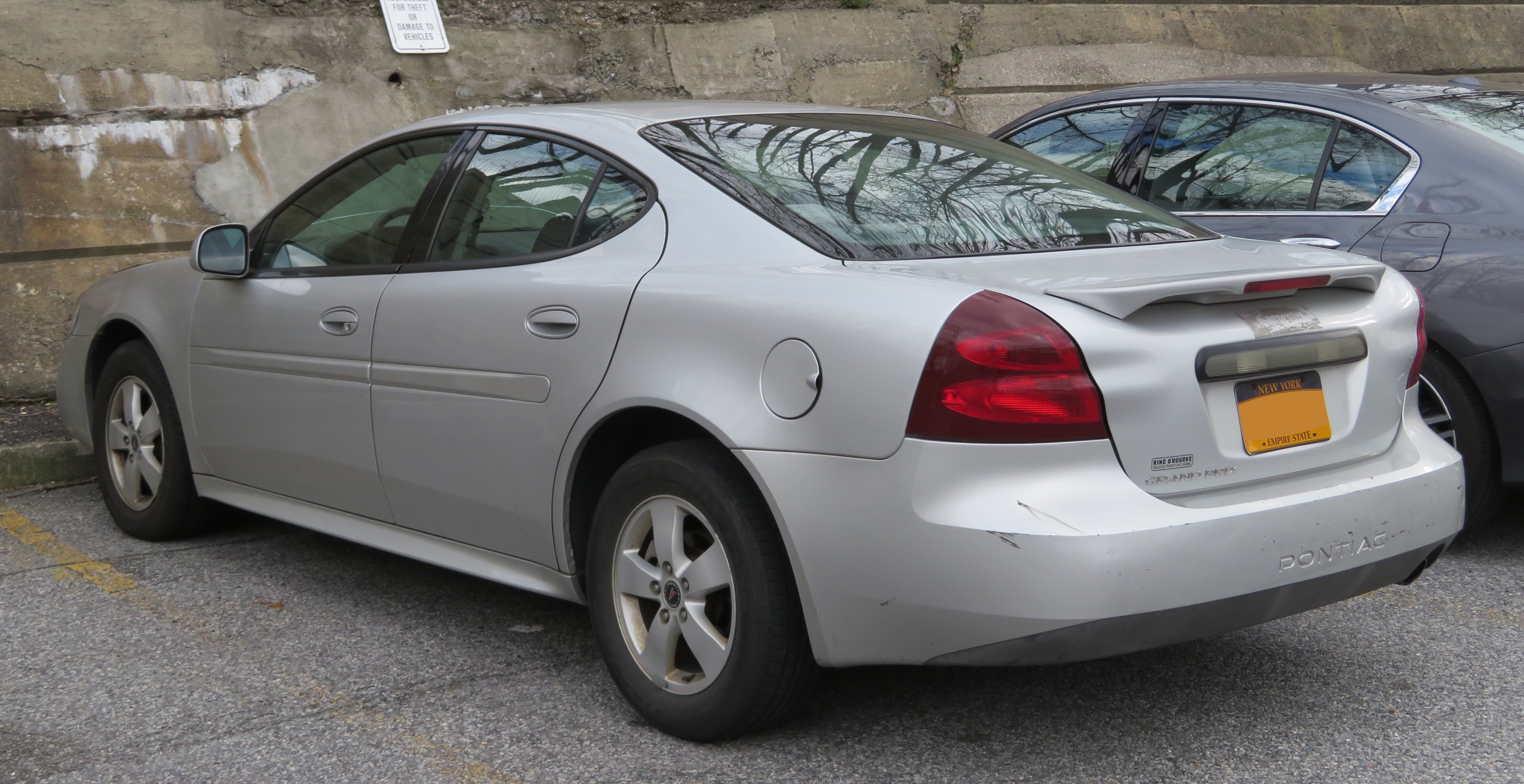
Pontiac Grand Prix 2004-2008 rear view

=== 2008 ===
2008 was the Pontiac Grand Prix's last model year. For 2008, Pontiac did not offer the GT trim, but continued to offer both a base and GXP trim. The base trim was offered with 16 in (41 cm) wheels. The 2008 GXP used alcoa knockoff wheels with silver center caps. Several new colors were also added for the 2008 model year.

The Pontiac Grand Prix was replaced by the G8 for the 2008–2009 model year. Production of the larger G8, however, ended in June 2009. The Pontiac brand was dissolved in 2010 as part of GM's Chapter 11 reorganization.

=== Safety ratings ===
The IIHS gives the Grand Prix a Good overall score in the frontal impact test and a "Marginal" overall score for models equipped with side curtain airbags in the side impact test.

2006 National Highway Traffic Safety Administration (NHTSA) Crash Test Ratings:

- Frontal Driver:
- Frontal Passenger:
- Side Driver:
- Side Rear Passenger:
- Rollover:

2004-2008 Pontiac Grand Prix models equipped with side curtain airbags have a "4", "7", or "8" in the 7th position of the VIN.

== Canadian variants ==
During the first generation of the model line, the Pontiac Grand Prix was offered through GM of Canada under several brand names, styled slightly different from its U.S. namesake.

=== Parisienne Custom Sport (1964-1965) ===
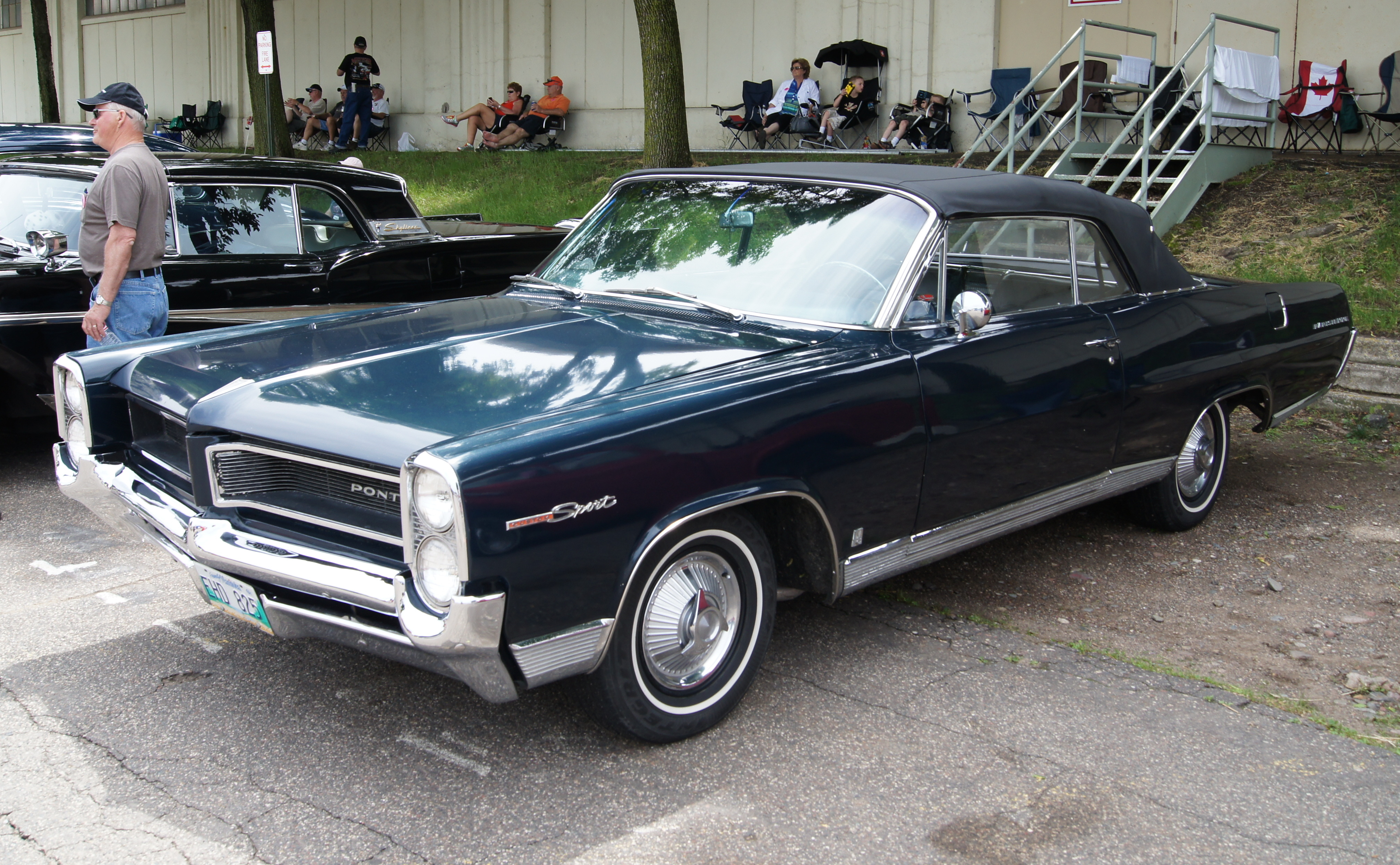
1964 Pontiac Parisienne Custom Sport convertible

In 1964, GM of Canada offered a de luxe version of the popular Pontiac Parisienne with the 1964 U.S. Grand Prix grille, the Parisienne Custom Sport. It was available as a hardtop coupe or convertible, and was basically equivalent to the Chevrolet Impala Super Sport.

The 1965 Parisienne Custom Sport continued to feature the 1965 U.S. Grand Prix front styling, but continued to offer the convertible, a body style not available on the American model until 1967.

=== Grande Parisienne (1966-1968) ===
For 1966, the Parisienne Custom Sport was replaced with the Pontiac Grande Parisienne, which featured the unique American Grand Prix front fascia (complete with hidden headlights in 1967–68). Unlike the U.S. car, the hardtop coupe was marketed alongside a convertible and four-door hardtop. The four-door and convertible versions had the same roofline as the standard Pontiacs while the coupe got the distinctive U.S. Grand Prix body styling.

Unlike the Grand Prix, the Grande Parisienne featured "Pontiac" badges in the grille. Following the shift of the Grand Prix from the full-size to the intermediate line for 1969, the Grande Parisienne was repackaged as a premium model of the full-size Parisienne. All full-sized Canadian Pontiacs used Chevrolet drivetrains with Pontiac-styled fascias and instrument panels.
