= Chevrolet Monte Carlo =

Two-door coupe manufactured by General Motors

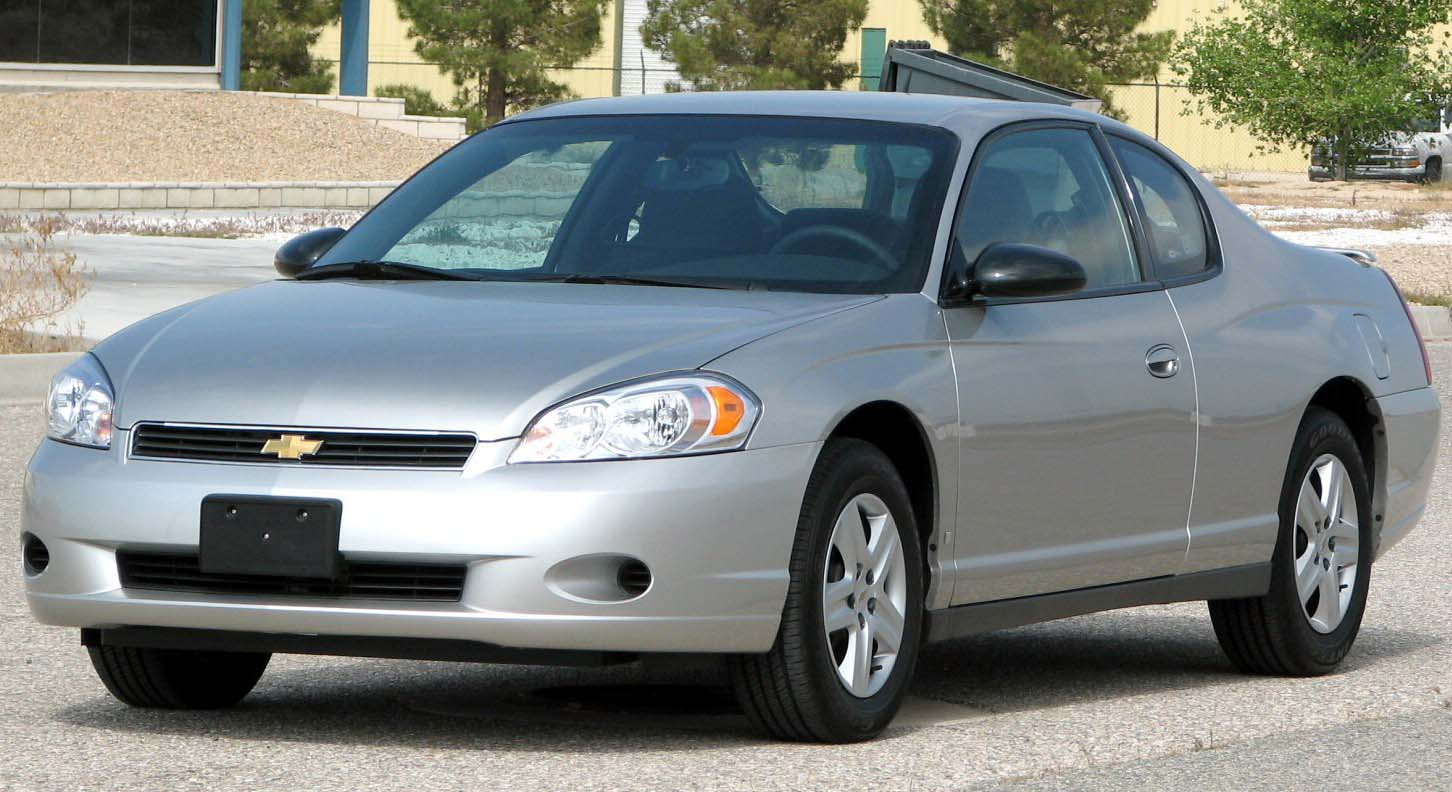
- 2006 Chevrolet Monte Carlo LS

Overview
- Manufacturer: Chevrolet (General Motors)
- Production: 1969–1987; 1994–2007
- Model years: 1970–1988; 1995–2007

Body and chassis
- Class: Personal luxury car
- Body style: 2-door coupé
- Layout: FR layout (1970–1987); FF layout (1995–2007)

The Chevrolet Monte Carlo is a two-door coupe that was manufactured and marketed by the Chevrolet division of General Motors. Deriving its name from the city in Monaco, the Monte Carlo was marketed as the first personal luxury car of the Chevrolet brand. Introduced for the 1970 model year, the model line was produced across six generations through the 2007 model year, with a hiatus from 1989 until 1994. The Monte Carlo was a variant of the Pontiac Grand Prix throughout its production.

From 1970 to 1972, the Monte Carlo rode on the unique "A-Special" platform with the Grand Prix, then switched to the standard A-body intermediate chassis from 1973 through 1977. For 1978, the Monte Carlo line underwent downsizing, but was still considered a midsized coupe. The rear-wheel-drive A-body platform of this generation of Monte Carlo was redesignated as the G-body when GM's front-wheel-drive A-body cars were introduced for the 1982 model year. After an abbreviated 1988 model year, the Monte Carlo was replaced by the two-door Chevrolet Lumina.

For the 1995 model year, the Monte Carlo was revived, replacing the two-door Lumina. It shared the front-wheel drive W-platform with the two-door Grand Prix, and was the largest coupe in the Chevrolet lineup. After the 2002 model year, the Grand Prix coupe was discontinued, and the Monte Carlo became the largest two-door model produced by an American auto manufacturer.

In response to declining sales of the model line, Chevrolet discontinued the Monte Carlo after the 2007 model year. During much of its production, the Monte Carlo represented the Chevrolet brand in stock car racing. During the 1980s, the Monte Carlo SS was introduced, featuring aerodynamically enhanced styling; as part of its revival, the Monte Carlo again represented Chevrolet in stock car racing from 1995 through its discontinuation.

== Development ==
For the 1968 model year, GM instituted a split-wheelbase policy for its A-platform intermediate-sized cars. Two-door models would have a 112 in (2,845 mm) wheelbase, 116 in (2,946 mm) for sedans, and 121 in (3,073 mm) for station wagons. In 1969, GM introduced the Pontiac Grand Prix, a two-door that used the A-platform layout that was stretched ahead of the firewall to make it 210.2-inch (5,339 mm) long. This gave the design an unusually long hood design, helping the new Grand Prix to outsell its larger B-body predecessor despite higher prices. The new layout was first known as the A-body Special, but would evolve into its own class known as the G-platform.

The Monte Carlo began as Chevrolet's version of the Pontiac Grand Prix, as conceived by Elliot M. (Pete) Estes, general manager of Chevrolet, and Chevrolet's chief stylist, David Holls, giving Chevrolet and Pontiac an alternative to the E-body Buick Riviera and Oldsmobile Toronado. They modeled the styling on the contemporary Cadillac Eldorado. However, much of the body and structure were shared with the Chevrolet Chevelle (firewall, windshield, decklid, and rear window were the same). New exterior "coke bottle styling" featured concealed windshield wipers. A fiber-optic exterior light monitoring system was optional.

A mid-1990s article in the magazine Chevrolet High Performance stated that the first generation Monte Carlo was known to Chevrolet management under the working name Concours. The usual practice at the time was that all Chevrolet model development names started with a "C". At one point, the proposal called for a formal coupe, sedan, and convertible. It has been noted that the sedan resembled a full-size Oldsmobile 98 before the use of the GM G platform, with at least one photograph showing the pull-up door handles that would be introduced on the 1970 Camaro and then on 1971 Vegas and full-sized Chevys. Monte Carlos received this design on the 1973 second-generation model. The 1970 Monte Carlo was available only as a two-door hardtop.

The Monte Carlo was developed at Chevrolet under the leadership of Pete Estes, it was formally introduced in September 1969 by John Z. DeLorean, who succeeded Estes as Chevrolet's general manager earlier in the year after previously heading the Pontiac division, where he led the development of the Series 276 Grand Prix.

== First generation (1970–1972) ==
First generation
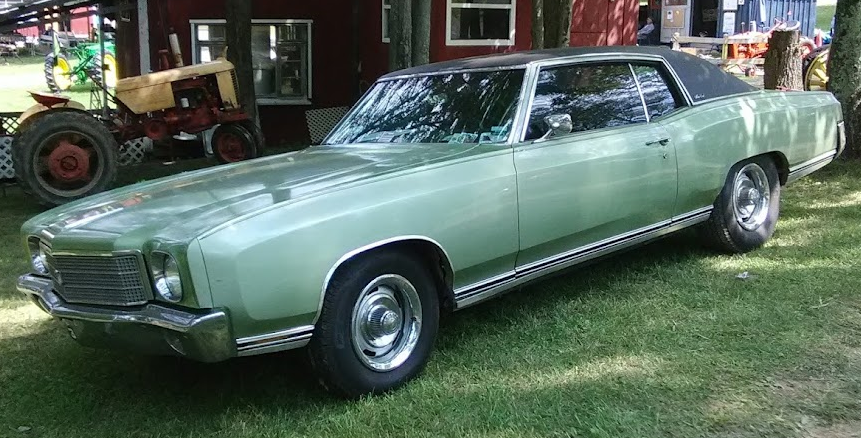
- 1970 Chevrolet Monte Carlo

Overview
- Production: 1969–1972
- Model years: 1970–1972
- Assembly: Flint, Michigan (1970 only); Arlington, Texas (1970–1972); Baltimore, Maryland (1970–1972); Leeds, Missouri (1971–1972); Van Nuys, California (1970–1972); Oshawa, Ontario, Canada (1971–1972)
- Designer: Terry Henline under Dave Holls

Body and chassis
- Class: Personal luxury car
- Body style: 2-door hardtop
- Layout: FR layout
- Platform: A-body
- Related: Pontiac Grand Prix

Powertrain
- Engine: 350 cu in (5.7 L) Turbo-Fire V8; 400 cu in (6.6 L) Turbo-Fire V8; 402 cu in (6.6 L) Turbo-Jet V8; 454 cu in (7.4 L) Turbo-Jet V8
- Transmission: 4-speed manual 3-speed manual 2-speed automatic 3-speed automatic

Dimensions
- Wheelbase: 116 in (2,946 mm)
- Length: 206.5 in (5,245 mm)
- Width: 76 in (1,930 mm)
- Height: 52.9 in (1,344 mm)

=== 1970 ===
The styling of the 1970 model-year Monte Carlo is distinguished by its chromed rectangular grille having a fine grid pattern of 720 small squares with two horizontal dividers and centered in it was a chrome and red crest emblem adorned by a Corinthian helmet (commonly referred to as the "knight's crest"), a thin hood spear with no vertical hood ornament, round headlamps with rounded chrome bezels (which appeared on a prototype 1970 Chevelle front end proposal which was rejected for the four headlight design), circular parking lamps inset into the front bumper directly below the headlamps, and taillights with chrome trim around the perimeter of the lens, only.

The standard powertrain was the 350 cu in (5.7 L) Chevrolet "Turbo-Fire" small-block V8 with a two-barrel carburetor, rated at 250 hp (186 kW; 253 PS) (gross) at 4500 rpm and 345 lb⋅ft (468 N⋅m) of torque at 2800 rpm, mated to a column-mounted 3-speed Synchro-Mesh manual transmission. Front disc brakes were standard equipment. The dashboard was identical to the Chevelle except for simulated wood veneer trim, which was according to the Chief Stylist a photographic reproduction of the elm trim used by Rolls-Royce, and higher grade nylon or vinyl upholstery and deep-twist carpeting were used. Base priced at US$3,123, the Monte Carlo cost $218 more than a comparable Chevelle Malibu, yet lower than a Chevrolet Caprice Sport Coupe.

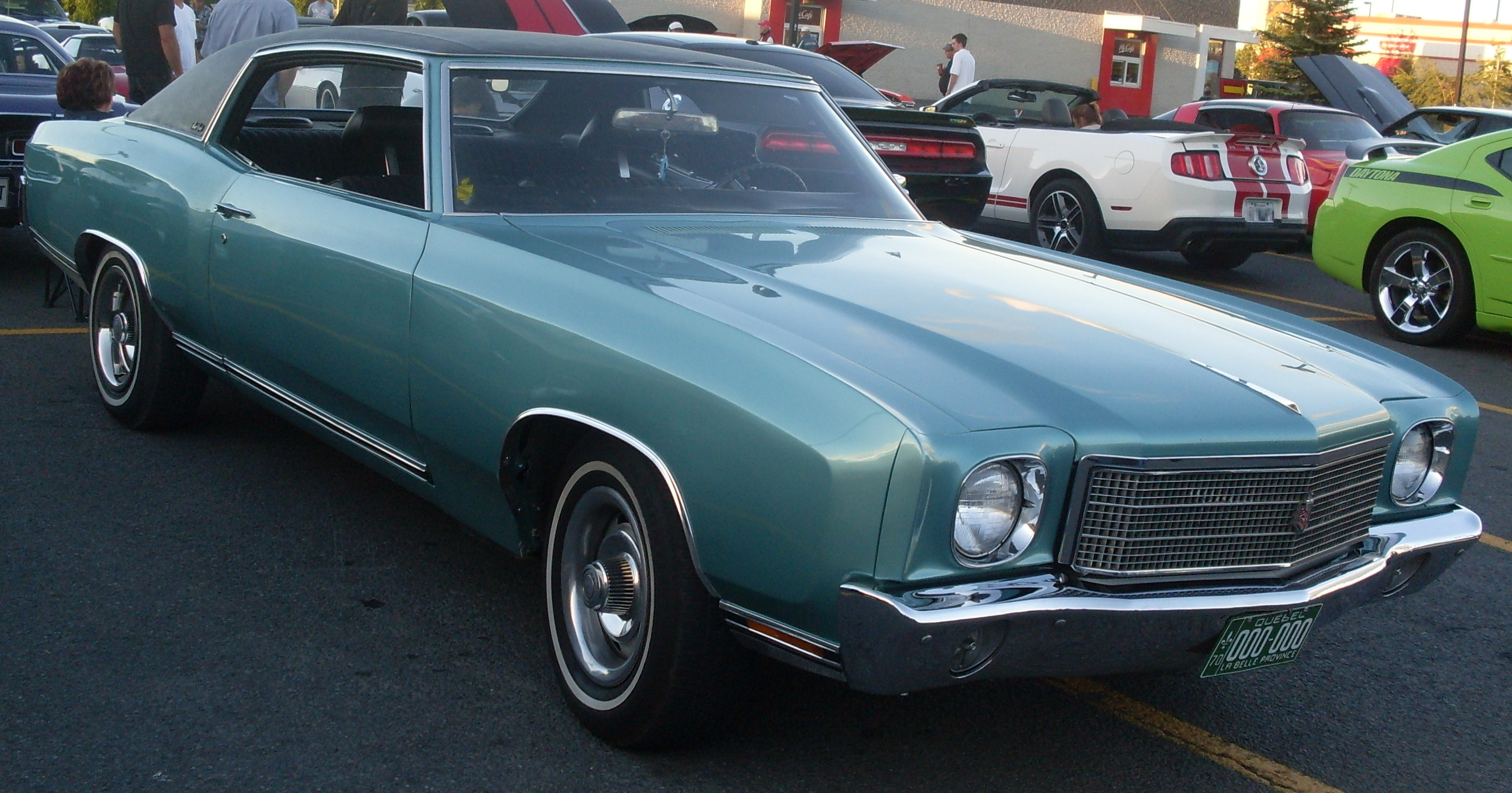
1970 Chevrolet Monte Carlo

Various options were available. A two-speed Powerglide automatic transmission (on 350 cu in (5.7 L) engines only), three-speed Turbo-Hydramatic, or a four-speed manual; most Monte Carlos were built with the Turbo-Hydramatic. Variable-ratio power steering, power windows, air conditioning, power seats, "rally" wheels, bucket seats, center console, full instrumentation, rear wheel fender skirts, and other accessories were also available, bringing the price of a fully equipped Monte Carlo to more than $5,000.

Optional engines included the four-barrel carbureted "Turbo-Fire" 350 cu in (5.7 L) small block V8, rated at 300 hp (224 kW; 304 PS) at 4800 rpm and 380 lb⋅ft (515 N⋅m) at 3200 rpm; the "Turbo-Fire" (400 cu in (6.6 L)) with a two-barrel carburetor, rated at 265 hp (198 kW; 269 PS) at 4800 rpm and 400 lb⋅ft (542 N⋅m) at 3800 rpm; and the "Turbo-Jet" (402 cu in (6.6 L)) with a four-barrel carburetor, rated at 330 hp (246 kW; 335 PS) at 4800 rpm and 410 lb⋅ft (556 N⋅m) at 3200 rpm.

The sporty and most powerful option was the Monte Carlo SS 454 package. Priced at $420, it included a standard Turbo-Jet (454 cu in (7.4 L)) with a four-barrel carburetor, rated at 360 hp (268 kW; 365 PS) at 4800 rpm. It also included heavy-duty suspension, wider wheels and tires, "SS 454" badging, and an automatic load-leveling rear suspension. The Turbo Hydra-Matic three-speed automatic was the only transmission available for this package. The rear axle came standard with a 3.06 ratio, with 2.56 and 3.31 available for $222 extra. Total SS 454s production was 3,823 for the year.

A labor strike at Chevrolet's Flint, Michigan, assembly plant (where most Monte Carlo production was scheduled) during the early months of the 1970 model year immediately following the car's introduction on September 18, 1969, limited overall model-year sales to 159,341; short of the projected 185,000. During those early months, Monte Carlos were in short supply, with full production not achieved until February 1970.

Popular Mechanics reported that 82% of readers who bought a Monte Carlo got one for the styling. However, 10.1% of readers disliked the amount of rear legroom.

=== 1971 ===
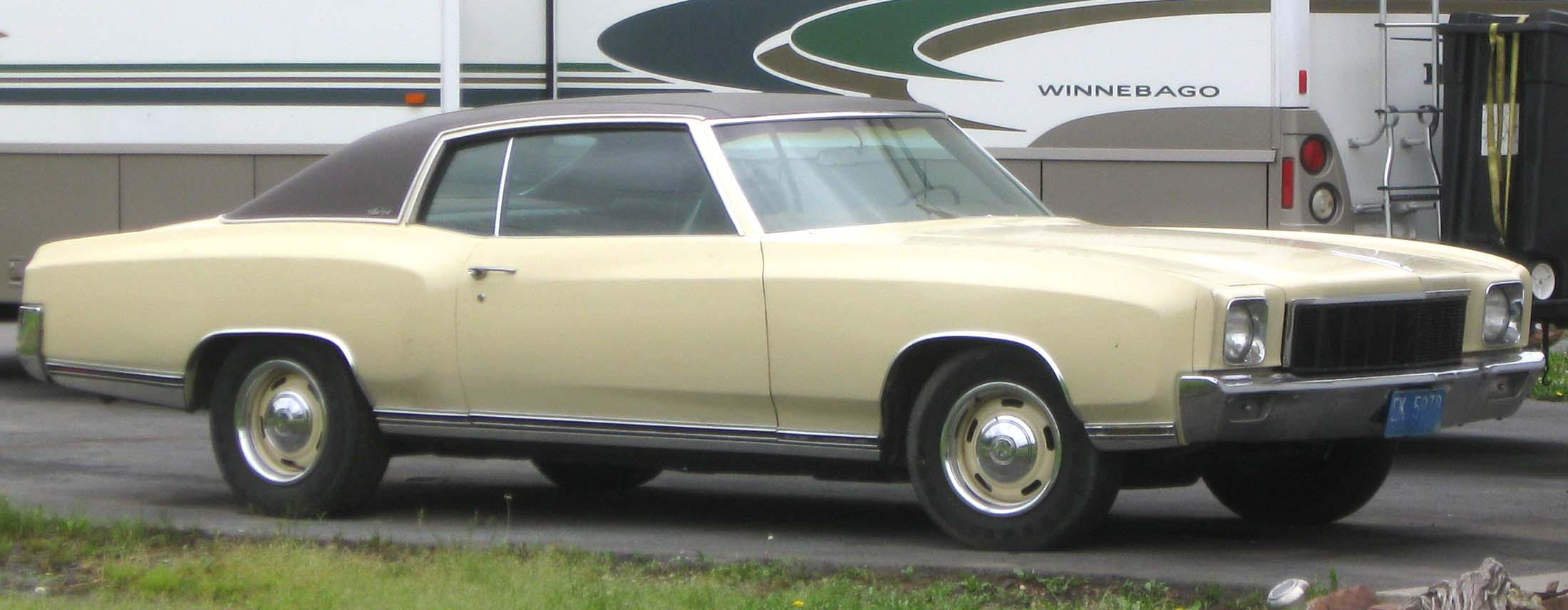
1971 Chevrolet Monte Carlo

The 1971 model saw minor styling changes, mostly cosmetic. The headlamp bezels were more of a squircle shape with rectangular front parking lamps. The grille had no horizontal divider, and the openings were rectangular. The hood spear included a stand-up ornament with "Chevrolet" script lettering. The grille emblem featured the year, "1971" in Roman numerals. The trunk lock keyhole had the Monte Carlo crest surrounding it. The taillights now had two horizontal and one vertical chrome strip. The SS model featured new "European" symbol control knobs and a four-spoke steering wheel became optional. AM/FM stereo radios with 8-track tape players were also optional. Mechanically it was largely unchanged, although the small-block Turbo-Fire 400 two-barrel engine was dropped. Other engines had compression ratios lowered to allow the use of regular leaded, low-lead, or unleaded gasoline, per a GM corporate edict. Engine ratings fell to 245 hp (183 kW; 248 PS) for the base Turbo-Fire 350 cu in (5.7 L) two-barrel, 270 hp (201 kW; 274 PS) for the Turbo-Fire 350-4V, and 300 hp (224 kW; 304 PS) for the Turbo-Jet 400. The SS 454 engine was raised to a nominal 365 hp (272 kW; 370 PS) rating despite the reduction in compression ratio. This increase in horsepower resulted from the 454 engine using the more aggressive camshaft compared to the previous 390 hp (291 kW; 395 PS) 454 rating in the 1970 Chevrolet Corvette and full-sized sedans.

Chevrolet listed both gross and SAE net horsepower figures in 1971, with the impending change to SAE net ratings in 1972. The ratings compared as follows:

Engine	Displacement	Carburetor	Gross hp	Net hp
Turbo-Fire 350 CID V8	5733 cm^{3}	2-bbl	245 hp	165 hp
Turbo-Fire 350 CID V8	5733 cm^{3}	4-bbl	270 hp	175 hp
Turbo-Jet 400 CID V8	6570 cm^{3}	4-bbl	300 hp	260 hp
Turbo-Jet 454 CID V8	7446 cm^{3}	4-bbl	365 hp	285 hp

After this year, the SS 454 package would be discontinued after the production of 1,919 units, but the 454 CID V8 engine would remain optional in Monte Carlos through 1975. The reason for discontinuing the SS was that the Monte Carlo was marketed as a luxury vehicle instead of a muscle car.

The Monte Carlo was considered the best-suited Chevrolet model for stock car racing by most NASCAR teams due to its 116 in (2,900 mm) wheelbase (only one inch above NASCAR's minimum requirements at that time, the Chevelle two-door body style had a shorter 112-inch wheelbase) and long-hood design which placed the engine further back in the chassis than most other vehicles for better weight distribution. Thus, the Monte Carlo became Chevy's standard-bearer for NASCAR from 1971 until 1989.

Production of the 1971 Monte Carlo started slowly due to a 67-day corporate-wide walkout (labor strike) that coincided with the introduction of the 1971 models in September 1970. This left dealerships with only a small shipment of 1971 models (built before the strike) in stock until the strike was settled in mid-November 1970, and then slow-going in reaching normal production levels until around January 1, 1971. Model-year production ended at 128,600, including 1,919 SS models.

A total of twelve 1971 Monte Carlos were shipped to Australia in 1971 and converted to RH drive, four of these were SS models from the 1,919 produced.

=== 1972 ===
A Cadillac-like egg-crate grille similar to the 1971 Chevrolet Caprice, rectangular front parking lamps moved to the left and right edges of the grille, a wider hood spear without stand-up ornament, and a metal rear trim molding highlighted the changes to the 1972 Monte Carlo, the final year for the first-generation design. The SS was dropped, but a new Monte Carlo Custom option appeared as a one-year-only offering that included a unique suspension and other items previously included with the SS option. Unlike the departed SS package, it was available with any engine on the roster. The Monte Carlo Custom badging was similar to the Impala Custom.

The engines were essentially unchanged, but an industry-wide switch to SAE net hp numbers reduced the rated power of all Chevrolet engines. Chevrolet did not list gross horsepower figures for 1972. Compared to the 1971 model year output, only the 402 and 454 had a decrease in power. The new ratings for the Monte Carlo were:

Engine	Displacement	Carburetor	Net hp
Turbo-Fire 350 CID V8	5733 cm^{3}	2-bbl	165 hp
Turbo-Fire 350 CID V8	5733 cm^{3}	4-bbl	175 hp
Turbo-Jet 402 CID V8	6603 cm^{3}	4-bbl	240 hp
Turbo-Jet 454 CID V8	7446 cm^{3}	4-bbl	270 hp

In California, which had emissions standards more stringent than federal law, the 4-barrel carbureted 350 was the standard and only available engine. Also, the only transmission offered in California was the Turbo Hydramatic.

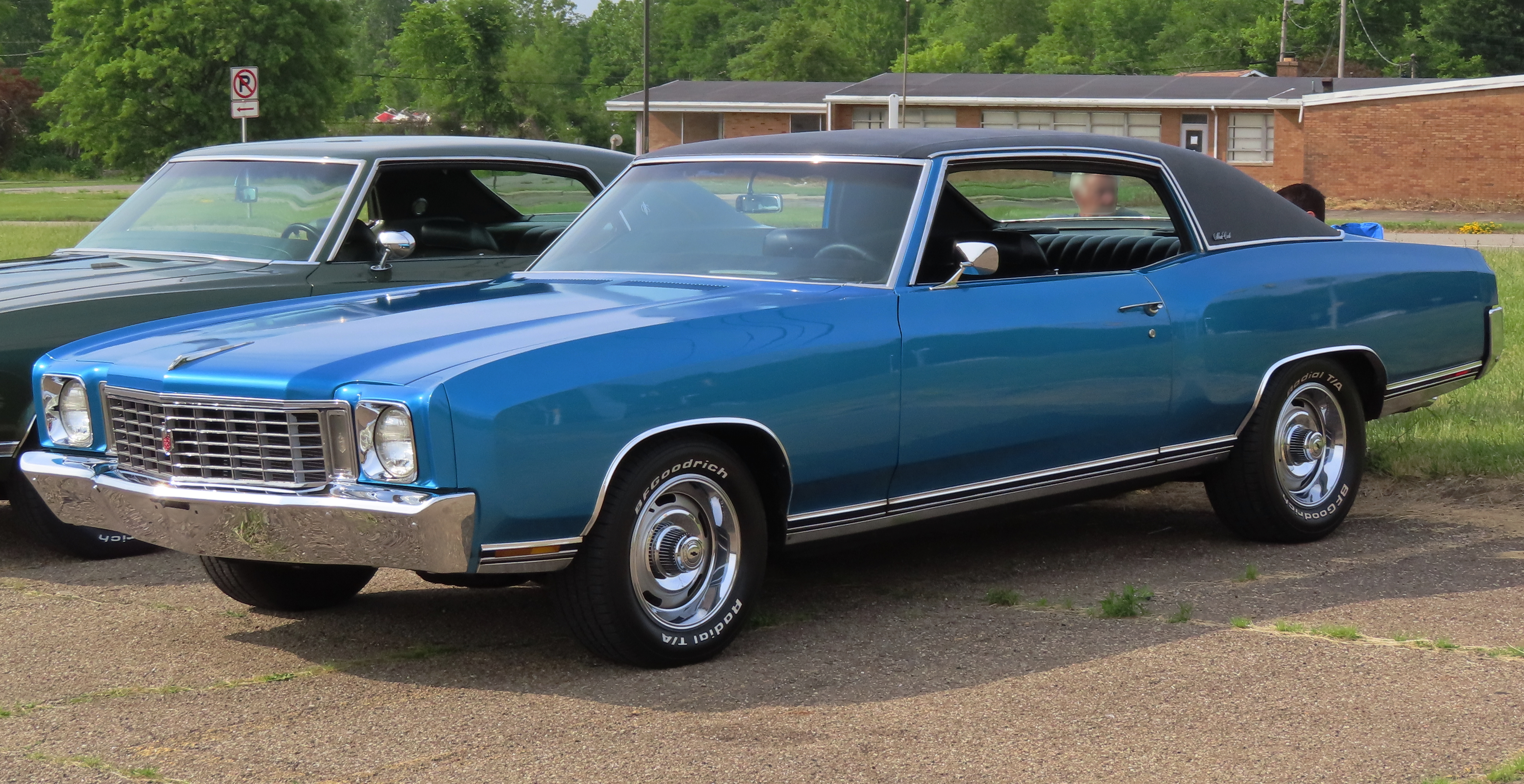
1972 Chevrolet Monte Carlo

For 1972, the four-speed manual transmission was discontinued from the option list as a line in the Monte Carlo brochure describing its market position as a personal luxury car stated, "Sorry, no four-on-the-floor." The standard three-speed manual and optional two-speed Powerglide automatic transmissions were offered only with the base 350 CID two-barrel engine, with the three-speed Turbo Hydramatic also available with this engine and a mandatory option with each of the optional engines.

Mechanically, the most significant change was that variable-ratio power steering became standard equipment for the first time.

Interior trim was relatively unchanged from 1971 other than the availability of all-vinyl upholstery with the standard bench seat and the optional Strato bucket seats. Cloth interiors were available with the bench or bucket seats. The 1972 model year's production increased to 180,819 to set a new record in the final year for the first-generation A-body. Monte Carlo and other Chevrolet models were promoted as part of a new ad campaign. The cars in print and broadcast ads were pictured at domestic tourist attractions and sites with the tagline "Chevrolet: Building a Better Way To See The USA."

== Second generation (1973–1977) ==
Second generation
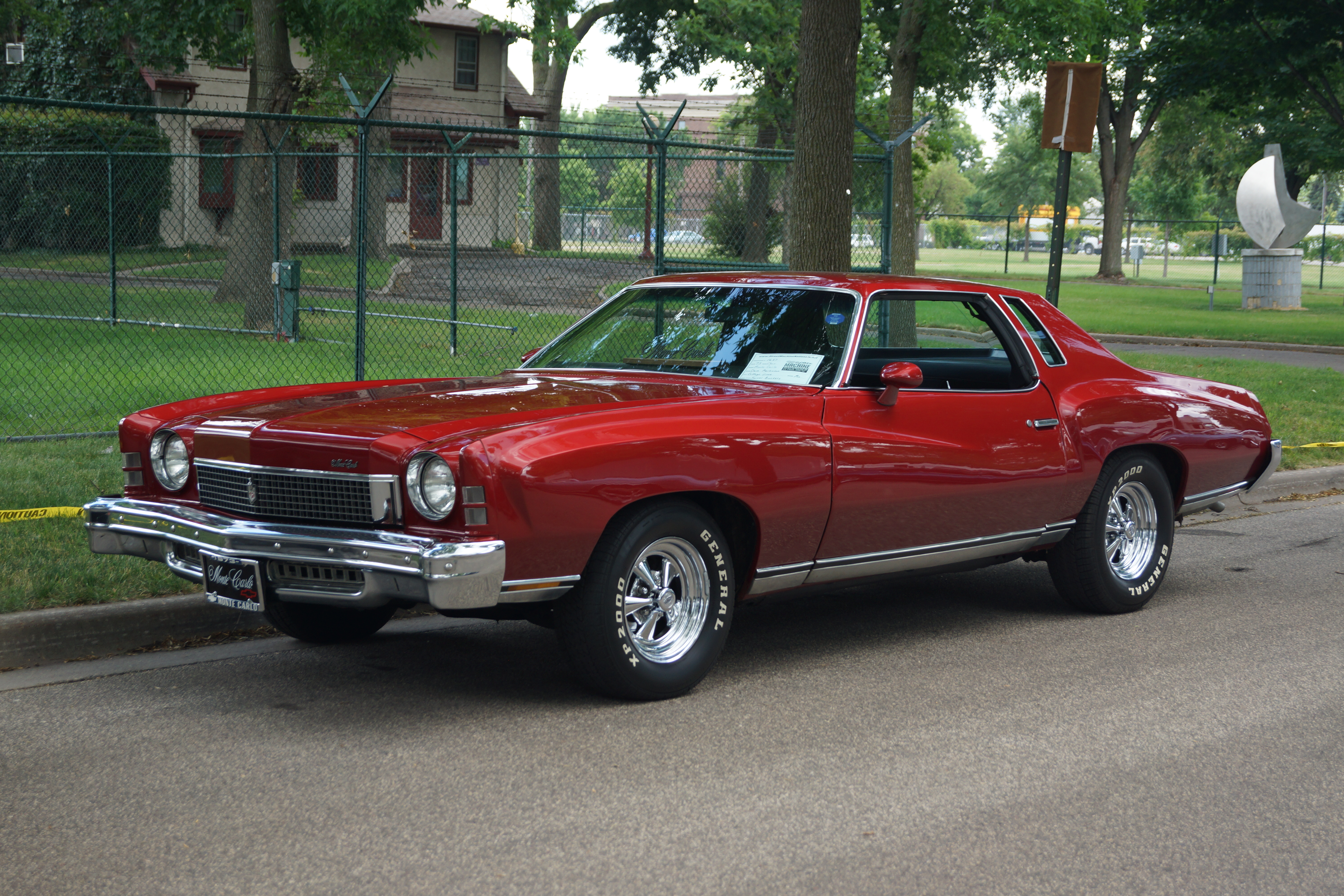
- 1973 Chevrolet Monte Carlo

Overview
- Production: 1972–1977
- Model years: 1973–1977
- Assembly: Arlington, Texas (1976–1977); Baltimore, Maryland; Doraville, Georgia; Fremont, California; Leeds, Missouri; Oshawa, Ontario, Canada
- Designer: Irv Rybicki, Charles Stewart, Bill Porter, Leo Casillo

Body and chassis
- Body style: 2-door coupe
- Layout: FR layout
- Platform: A-body "Special"
- Related: Pontiac Grand Prix

Powertrain
- Engine: 305 cu in (5.0 L) V8; 350 cu in (5.7 L) V8; 400 cu in (6.6 L) V8; 454 cu in (7.4 L) V8
- Transmission: 3-speed manual 3-speed automatic

Dimensions
- Wheelbase: 116 in (2,946 mm)
- Length: 212.7 in (5,403 mm)
- Width: 77.6 in (1,971 mm) to 78.0 in (1,981 mm)

=== 1973 ===
A redesigned Monte Carlo was introduced alongside other GM intermediates. Like other GM mid-size cars, the 1973 Monte Carlo was no longer a hardtop, but a pillared "Colonnade" coupe with rear side opera windows and frameless door glass. Prominent styling included an egg-crate grille, a Monte Carlo emblem, and vertical taillights above the bumper. The front bumper was a large federally mandated 5 mph (8.0 km/h) bumper that was among the required 1973 federal safety standards for all passenger cars sold in the U.S. with the 5 mph (8.0 km/h) requirement extended to rear bumpers on 1974 models. Also new was a double-shell roof for improved noise reduction and rollover protection, along with the flush-mounted pull-up exterior door handles first introduced on the 1970½ Camaro and 1971 full-sized Chevrolets and Vegas.

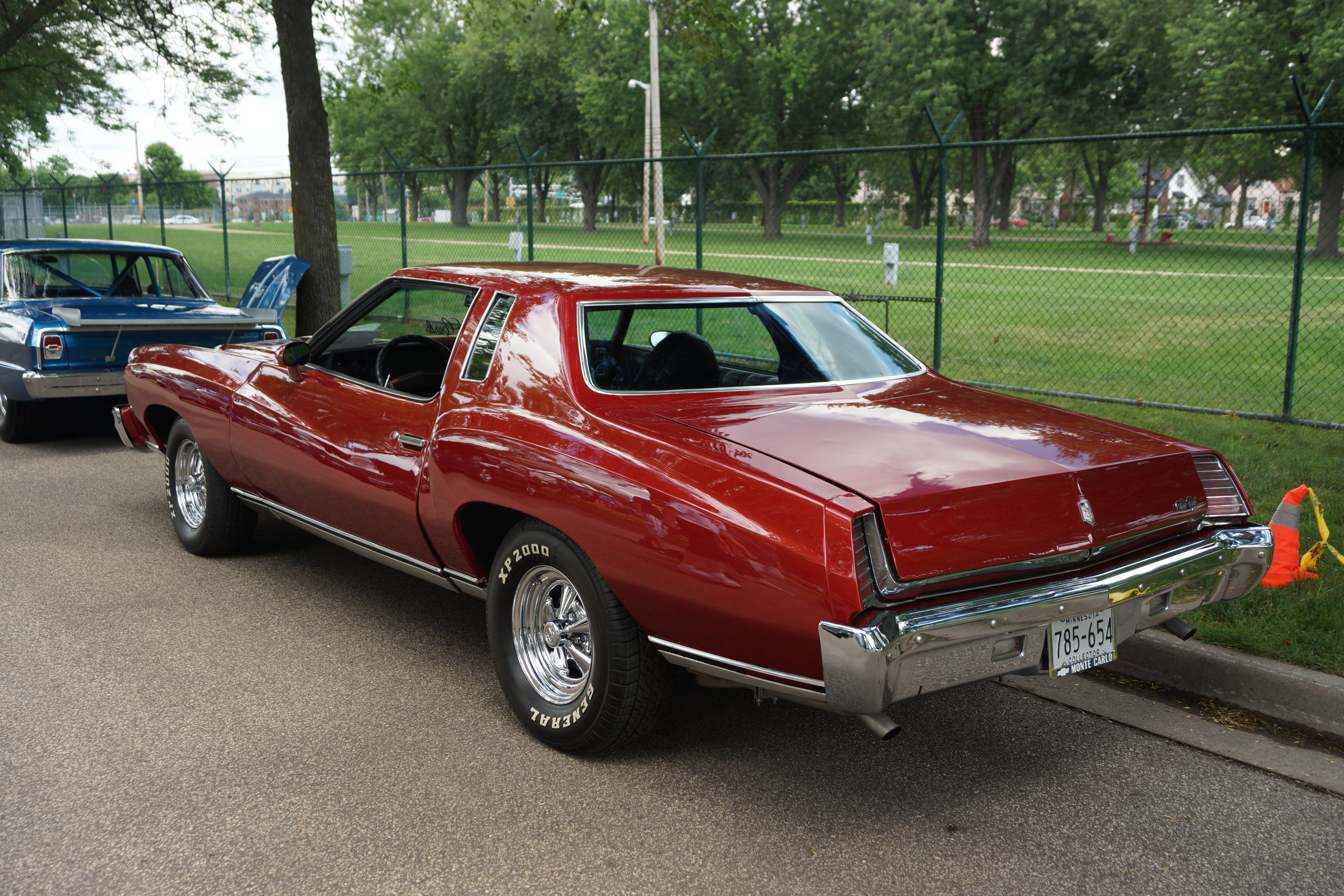
1973 Chevrolet Monte Carlo

The separate body-on-frame construction carried over for 1973, along with the basic all-coil suspension. The standard Monte Carlo with manual transmission retained "traditional" steering and bias-ply tires, but the radial-tuned system was included when the automatic transmission was ordered, earning the Monte Carlo S label. Optional were radial-ply tires, "Pliacell" shock absorbers (internal plastic membranes that separate the hydraulic fluid from the gas), high-caster steering, and front and rear anti-roll bars (previously offered only with the SS package).

A new model for 1973 was the Monte Carlo Landau, an "S" with a rear quarter Landau vinyl roof, Turbine II wheels, and driver and passenger-side sports mirrors. The interior of the 1973 Monte Carlo featured an all-new, wraparound cockpit-style instrument panel, similar to that found in some contemporary Pontiacs, Oldsmobiles, and Buicks, in which gauges and various instruments were centered within easy reach of the driver. The simulated burl elm trim was retained. A split bench seat was standard, but "Strato Bucket" seats of a new design were optional, along with a floor console featuring an equally new shifter with knob and button similar to Pontiac's Rally Sports Shifter replacing the Buick-like horseshoe shifter of previous years, and storage compartment. The bucket seats were of a one-piece high-back design with built-in headrests and could swivel almost 90 degrees to permit the driver and front passenger easier entry and exit, a feature previously offered on the 1962 Chrysler 300H. Cloth and vinyl trims were offered for bench and bucket seats.

The standard engine was a 145 hp (108 kW) 350 cu in (5.7 L) "Turbo-Fire" V8. Optional engines included a 175 hp (130 kW) 350 cu in (5.7 L) with a four-barrel carburetor and a four-barrel carbureted 454 cu in (7.4 L) "Turbo-Jet" V8 rated at 245 hp (183 kW).

The 1973 Monte Carlo was named "Car of the Year" by Motor Trend based on its new styling and emphasis on Euro-style ride and handling. The 1973 Monte Carlo set a new sales record for Chevrolet, with nearly 250,000 sold for the model year. The success of the Monte Carlo and Pontiac's similar Grand Prix led to several new personal luxury cars from competitors, including a revised Mercury Cougar, the Ford Gran Torino Elite, the Chrysler Cordoba, and restyled Dodge Charger as well as high-line versions of the AMC Matador that introduced a new coupe design for 1974.

=== 1974 ===
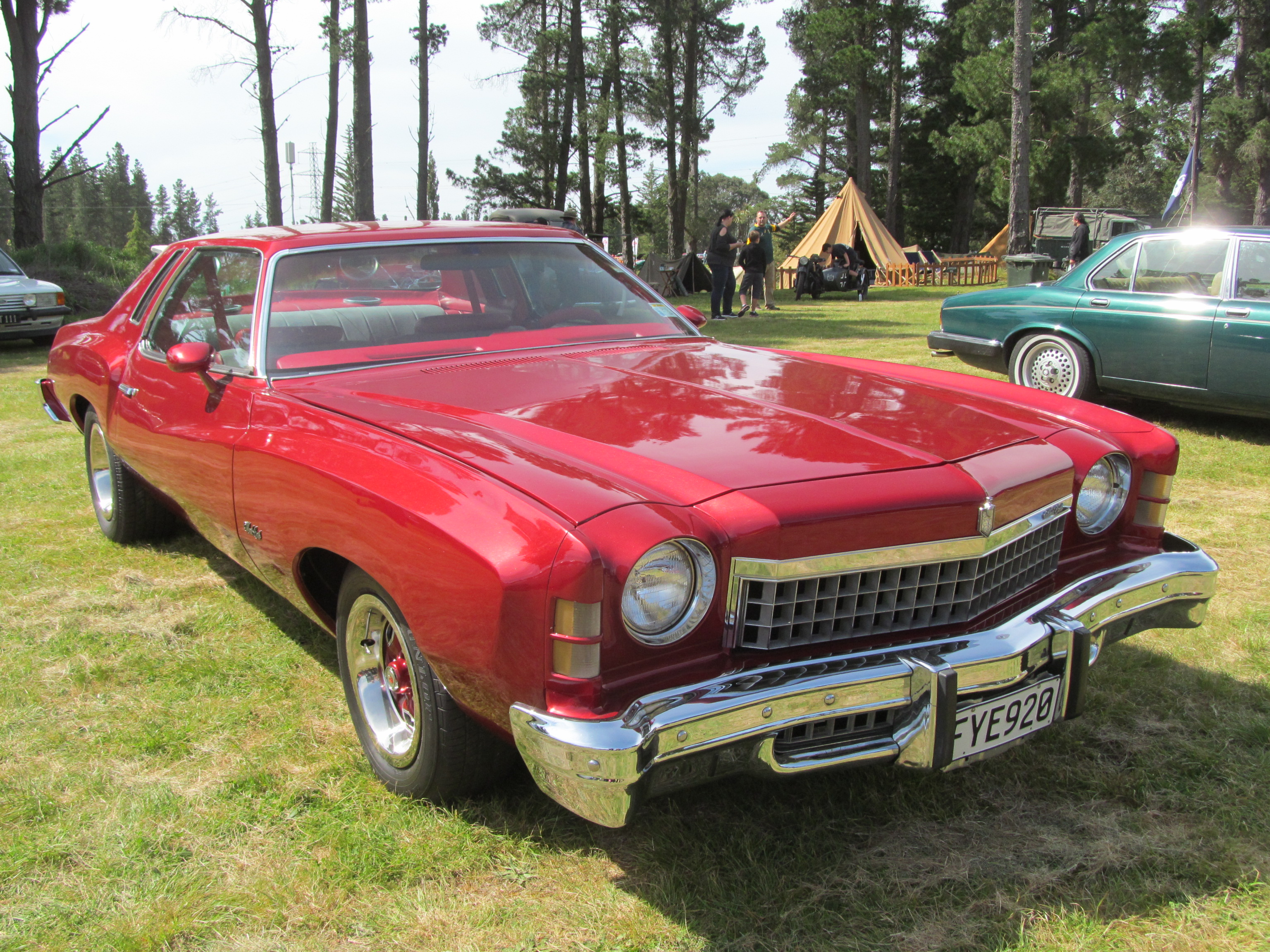
1974 Chevrolet Monte Carlo

The 1974 Monte Carlo received minor detail changes from its 1973 predecessor, most notably a revised egg-crate grille in the front, flush mount taillight, a relocated license plate and trunk lock mechanism. In 1973, the trunk lock was below the trunk deck and above the rear bumper in a space that no longer existed in the 1974 versions. A larger 5 mph (8.0 km/h) rear bumper was added. The driver and passenger door map pockets were no longer available.

The base Monte Carlo with a manual transmission, standard suspension, and bias-ply tires was discontinued, leaving only the "S" and "Landau" models equipped with radial-ply tires, upgraded suspensions, and standard power steering and front disc brakes.

A three-speed manual transmission was listed as standard equipment on 1974 "S" and "Landau" models equipped with the standard 350 cu in (5.7 L) and an automatic transmission was a required option with the larger 400 and 454 CID V8s. However, some sources indicate that Chevrolet built almost all 1974 Monte Carlos with the Turbo Hydra-Matic transmission.

The standard 350 cu in (5.7 L) "Turbo-Fire" V8 was again rated at 145 hp (108 kW) with a two-barrel carburetor in 49 states. For Californians, the standard engine was a 350 "Turbo-Fire" V8 with a four-barrel carburetor rated at 160 hp (120 kW) that was not offered in the other 49 states. Reappearing on the options list for the first time since 1970 was a 400 cu in (6.6 L) "Turbo-Fire" small block V8 rated at 150 hp (112 kW) with a two-barrel carburetor (not offered in California) or 180 hp (134 kW) with a four-barrel carburetor. The top engine was again the 454 cu in (7.4 L) "Turbo-Jet" big block V8 rated at 235 hp (175 kW).

Despite the Arab Oil Embargo of late 1973 and early 1974 that significantly cut into sales of standard and intermediate-sized cars in favor of smaller compacts and imported subcompacts, the Monte Carlo went the other way on the sales charts by setting a new sales record this year of over 300,000 units despite the long lines at gas stations and record-high gasoline prices. The Monte Carlo continued to lead in intermediate personal luxury car sales, with the Grand Prix placing second and the arrival of new competitors this year, including an upsized Mercury Cougar, Ford Gran Torino Elite, and AMC's Matador coupe. Chrysler would introduce its entries in this field for 1975, including the Chrysler Cordoba and redesigned Dodge Charger.

Interior Dimensions

What	Dimension
Head room-front	37.5"
Head room-rear	37.4"
leg room-front	42.1"
leg room-rear	32.9"

=== 1975 ===
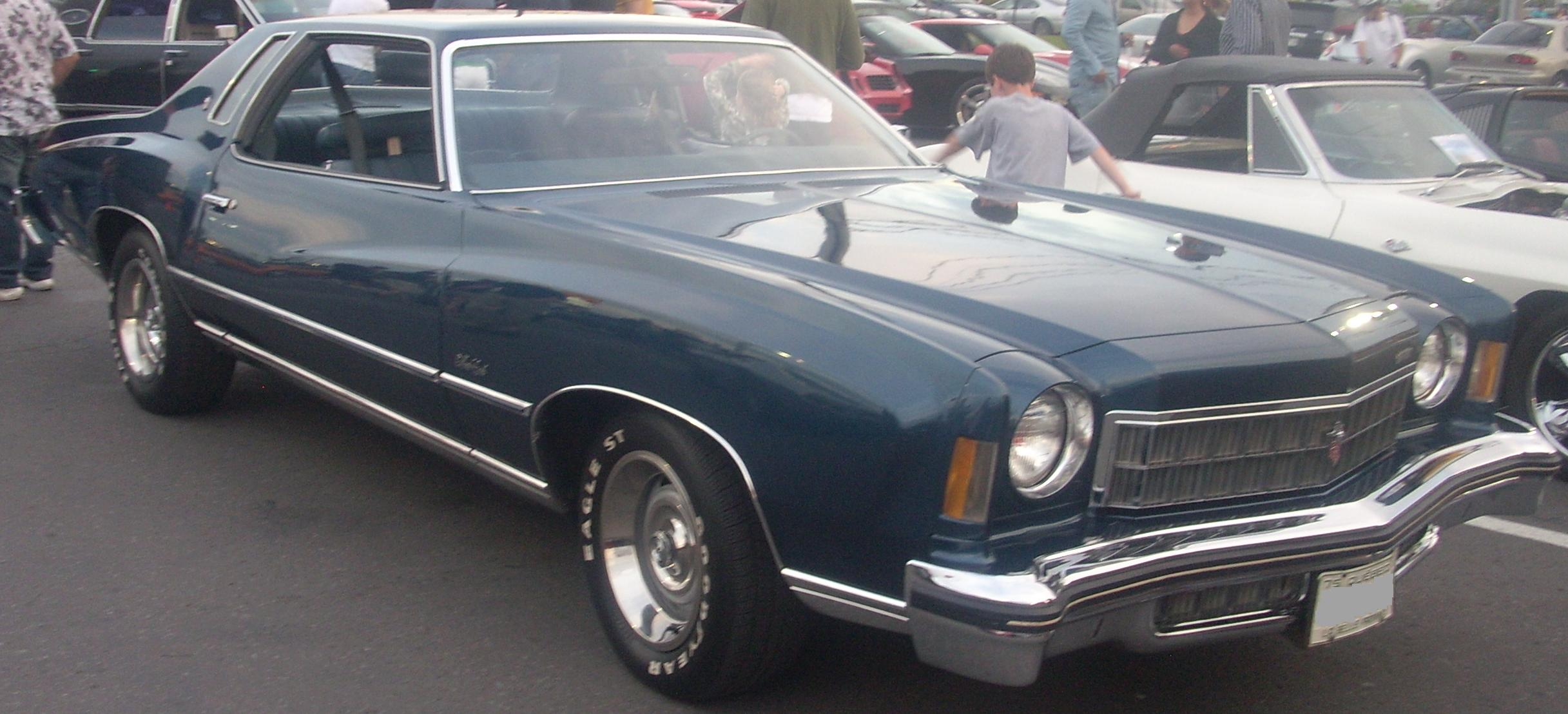
1975 Chevrolet Monte Carlo

The 1975 Monte Carlo received only minor styling changes from the 1974 model, including a new grille with the Monte Carlo emblem moved to the center section and new vertically shaped taillights with horizontal louvers. All models received catalytic converters to meet Federal and California emission requirements, including bonuses such as improved fuel economy and drivability, extended spark plug and muffler life, but required lower-octane unleaded gasoline.

Engines were a carryover from 1974, except for the addition of GM's High Energy electronic ignition, which was made standard equipment. Power ratings for all engines were decreased due to the addition of the catalytic converter. The 454 cu in (7.4 L) V8 was no longer offered on California cars, leaving the 400 cu in (6.6 L) four-barrel the top engine in that market. The base 350 cu in (5.7 L) two-barrel was rated at 145 hp (108 kW) (standard in 49 states), the 350 CID 4-barrel was rated at 155 hp (116 kW) (available only in California), the 400 CID 4-barrel 175 hp (130 kW), and the 454 CID 4-barrel 215 hp (160 kW) (now equipped with single exhaust with dual exhaust as an option). A three-speed manual transmission was standard equipment with the base 350 CID V8 used in 49 states and California-only 350 four-barrel V8. The Turbo Hydra-Matic was optional and a required option for the 400 and 454 V8s. Company sources claim that all 1975 Monte Carlos were equipped with the Turbo Hydra-Matic transmission, which became standard equipment for 1976.

New for 1975 was a Custom interior option that included a plusher cloth 50/50 bench seat with recliner on the passenger side and lower door panel carpeting. The standard interior consisted of a bench seat with knit-cloth and vinyl or all-vinyl upholstery. The swiveling Strato bucket seats with a center console and floor shifter were still optional, along with a knit cloth or vinyl upholstery. Also, white all-vinyl interiors were available for the first time this year, with either bench or bucket seats and contrasting colors for carpeting and instrument panels, including black, red, blue, and green. A gauge that showed if one was using too much gas, a part of the "Economider" Gauge package, became optional.

Sales dropped from 1974's record-setting pace due to higher list prices, a domestic economy with double-digit inflation, and new competition from Chrysler's Cordoba and Dodge's Charger SE. Monte Carlo production ended up at around 250,000 units.

=== 1976 ===
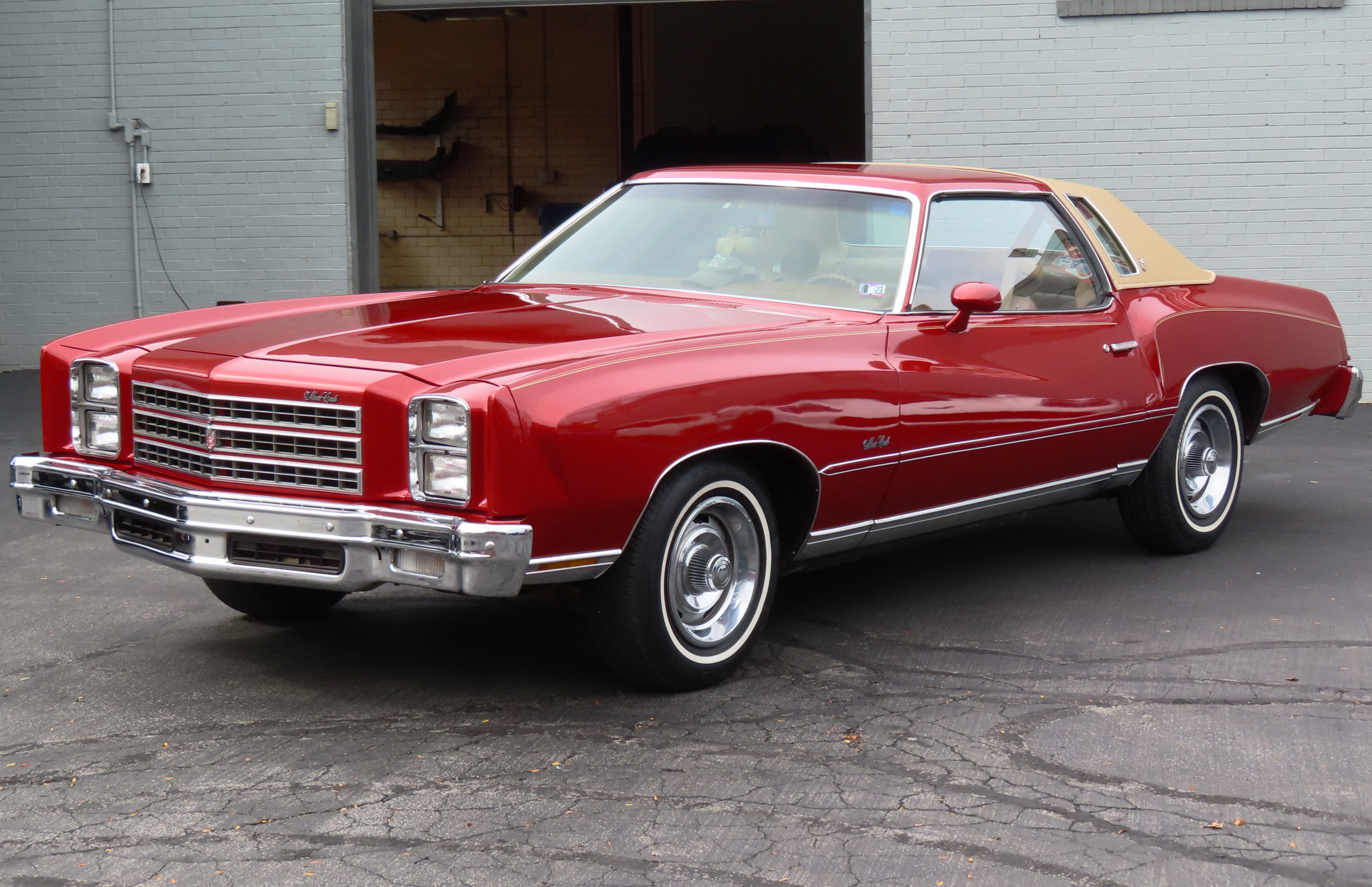
1976 Chevrolet Monte Carlo

A new crosshatch grille, vertically mounted rectangular headlamps, and reshaped taillights identified the 1976 Monte Carlo (the reshaped taillight pattern was later incorporated into the fourth-generation Monte Carlo). Under the hood, a new 140 hp (104 kW) 305 cu in (5.0 L) 2-barrel V8 became the standard engine with the 145 hp (108 kW) 350 cu in (5.7 L) 2-barrel and 175 hp (130 kW) 400 cu in (6.6 L) V8s optional. California cars included a 165 hp (123 kW) 350 cu in (5.7 L) 4-barrel as the base engine (not available in 49 states), and could be equipped with the 400 cu in (6.6 L) 4-barrel V8. The big-block 454 cu in (7.4 L) V8 was discontinued. The Turbo Hydramatic transmission became standard equipment on all 1976 Monte Carlos.

Interior trims remained the same as in 1975, with both base and custom levels, but the instrument panel and steering wheel featured a new rosewood trim that replaced the burled elm of previous years. A new option was a two-toned "Fashion Tone" paint combination. Monte Carlo sales hit a record total with 353,272 units this year. Of these, 191,370 were "S" Coupes and 161,902 Landau Coupes, which was an extra $293.

=== 1977 ===
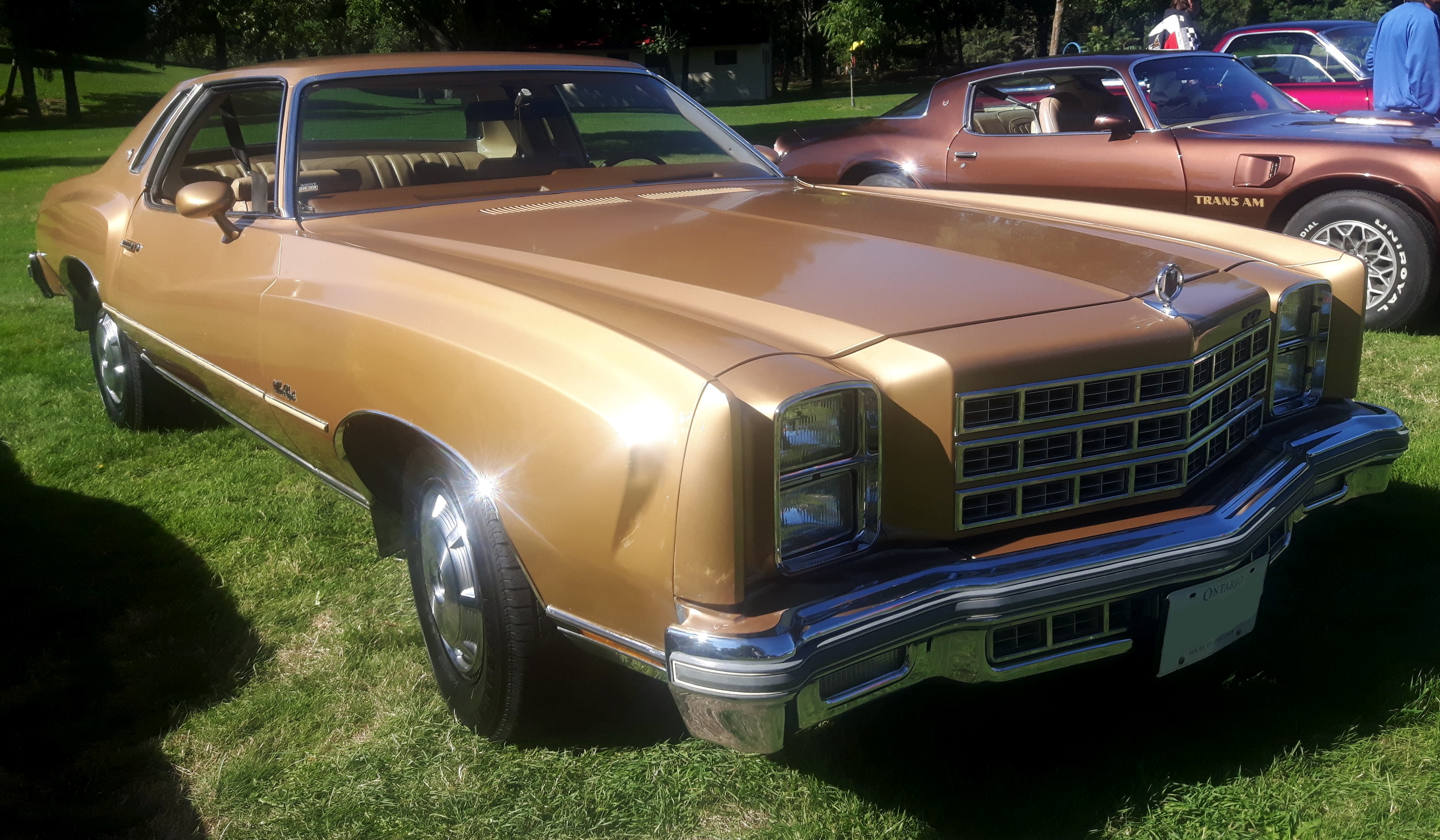
1977 Chevrolet Monte Carlo

A revised grille with smaller segments with the Monte Carlo "knight's crest" emblem moved to a stand-up hood ornament and revised taillight lenses marked the 1977 Monte Carlo, which was the last year for the 1973-vintage design before the introduction of a downsized 1978 Monte Carlo. Engine offerings were reduced to two engines for 1977. The base engine for 49 states was the 140 hp (104 kW) 305 cu in (5.0 L) 2-barrel V8 and the 170 hp (127 kW) 350 cu in (5.7 L) 4-barrel V8 was optional (standard in California). The 400-cubic-inch V8 was dropped as an engine option. The only transmission was the Turbo Hydra-Matic transmission.

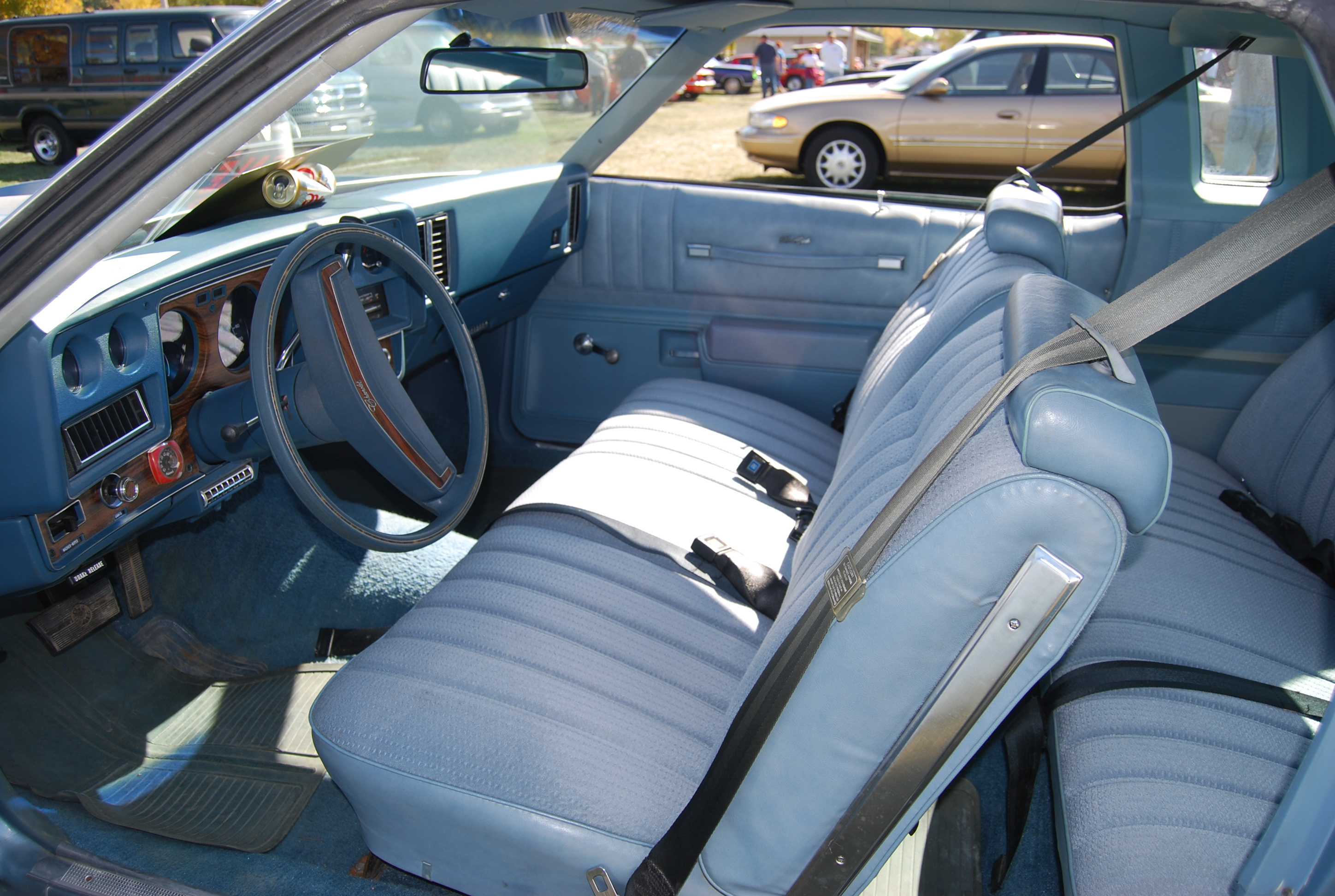
1977 Chevrolet Monte Carlo interior

Interior trim received only minor revisions this year with upholstery choices, including cloth, velour, and vinyl in base and Custom trims. Swivel-out front seats and an 8-track tape player were optional. This model year marks the only time in history when an intermediate model was bigger in every dimension than Chevrolet's full-sized models. The B-body Chevrolet Caprice/Impala had been redesigned and downsized for 1977. The Monte Carlo also weighed more. In 1977, sales totaled 224,327 S coupes and 186,711 Landau coupes.

== Third generation (1978–1980) ==
Third generation
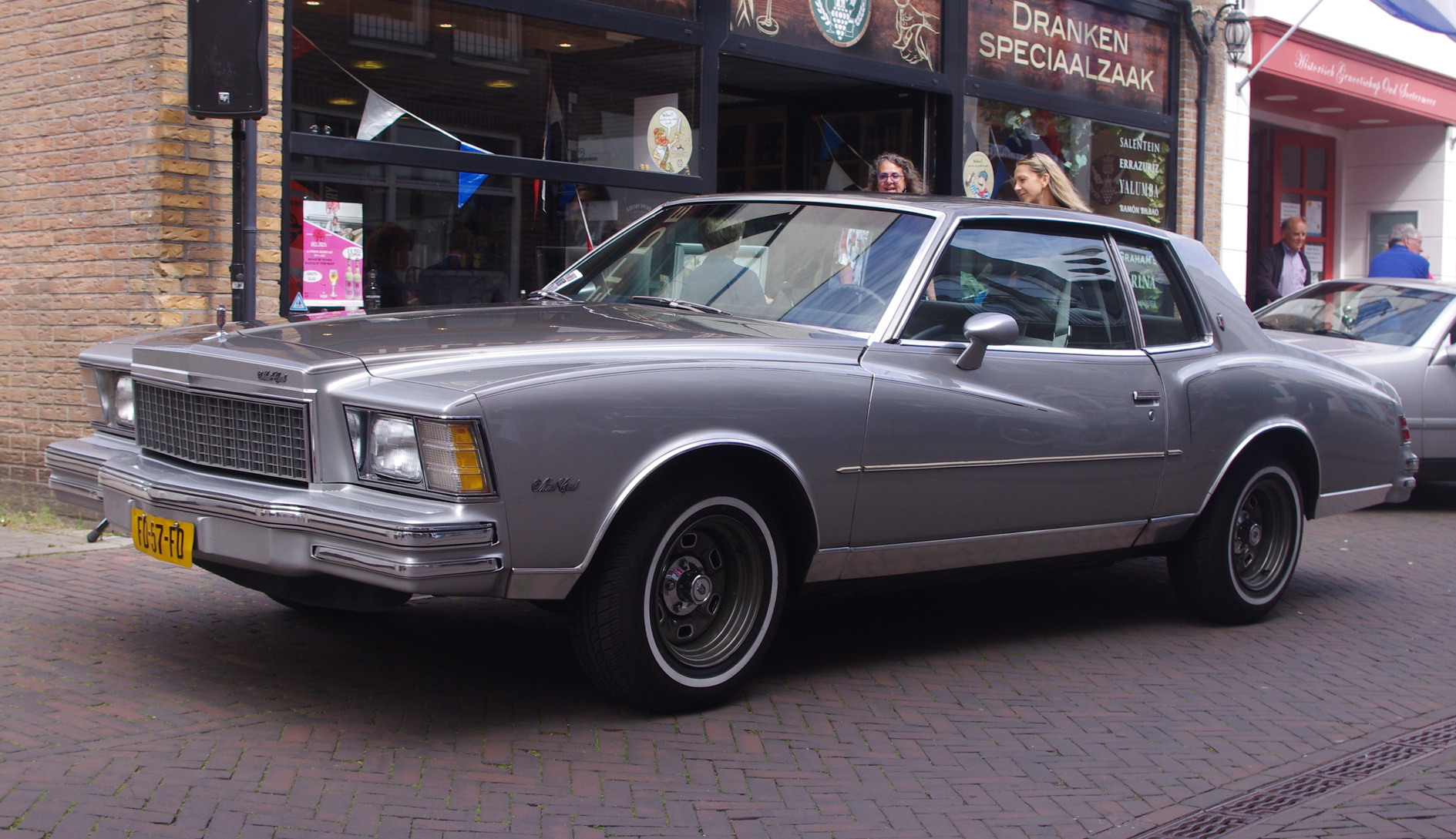
- 1979 Monte Carlo

Overview
- Production: 1977–1980
- Model years: 1978–1980
- Assembly: Arlington, Texas; Baltimore, Maryland; Doraville, Georgia; Fremont, California; Leeds, Missouri; Oshawa, Ontario, Canada
- Designer: Dave McIntosh

Body and chassis
- Body style: 2-door coupe
- Layout: FR layout
- Platform: A-body (RWD)
- Related: Pontiac Grand Prix; Oldsmobile Cutlass Supreme; Buick Regal

Powertrain
- Engine: 200 cu in (3.3 L) Chevrolet 90-degree V6; 229 cu in (3.8 L) Chevrolet 90-degree V6; 231 cu in (3.8 L) Buick V6; 262 cu in (4.3 L) Chevrolet 90-degree V6; 267 cu in (4.4 L) Chevrolet V8; 305 cu in (5.0 L) Chevrolet V8; 350 cu in (5.7 L) Oldsmobile diesel V8
- Transmission: 3-speed manual 4-speed manual 3-speed TH-350 4-speed 200-4R automatic or Saginaw standard for Mexican version

Dimensions
- Wheelbase: 108.0 in (2,740 mm)
- Length: 200.4 in (5,090 mm) (LS); 202.4 in (5,140 mm) (SS)
- Width: 71.8 in (1,820 mm)
- Height: 54.4 in (1,380 mm) (LS); 54.9 in (1,390 mm) (SS)
- Curb weight: 3,212 lb (1,457 kg) (LS); 3,239 lb (1,469 kg) (SS)

=== 1978 ===
All GM intermediate-sized cars, including the Monte Carlo, were downsized for the 1978 model year in response to the 1973 Arab Oil Embargo and CAFE requirements. The 1978 model was 700-800 lb lighter and 15 inches shorter than the 1977 model. The 1978 model also had more interior and trunk space than the 1977 model. The engines offered in previous years were dropped in favor of a standard 231 cu in (3.8 L) V6 built by Buick or an optional Chevrolet 305 cu in (5.0 L) V8. New one-piece wall-to-wall carpeting was standard. The three-speed manual transmission reappeared as standard equipment on the base model with the V6 engine with the automatic optional. The optional V8 and all Landau models came standard with the automatic. A four-speed manual transmission with floor shifter was optional with the 305 cu in (5.0 L) V8, the first time a four-speed manual was offered on the Monte Carlo since 1971.

=== 1979 ===
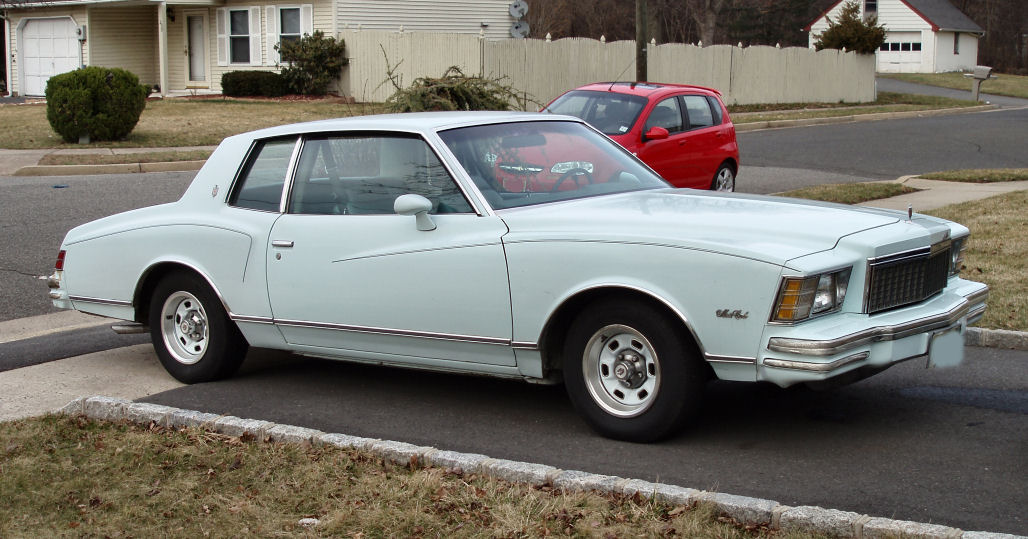
1979 Chevrolet Monte Carlo

Minor trim changes were made to the 1979 Monte Carlo, including a restyled grille, revised parking lamp detail, and new wrap-around taillamps. Mechanical changes included a new Chevrolet-built 200 cu in (3.3 L) V6 as the standard engine for the base Monte Carlo in 49 states while the Buick 231 cu in (3.8 L) V6 remained standard on base models in California and all Landau models. A new 125 hp (93 kW) 267 cu in (4.4 L) V8 became optional and the 140 hp (104 kW) 305 cu in (5.0 L) V8 continued as an option but was joined by a 160 hp 235 lbf⋅ft (319 N⋅m) version with a four-barrel carburetor. The same transmissions were carried over from 1978, including a standard three-speed manual, an optional four-speed manual, or an optional three-speed Turbo Hydramatic automatic. This was the last year that Chevrolet offered manual transmissions on the Monte Carlo due to low buyer interest.

=== 1980 ===
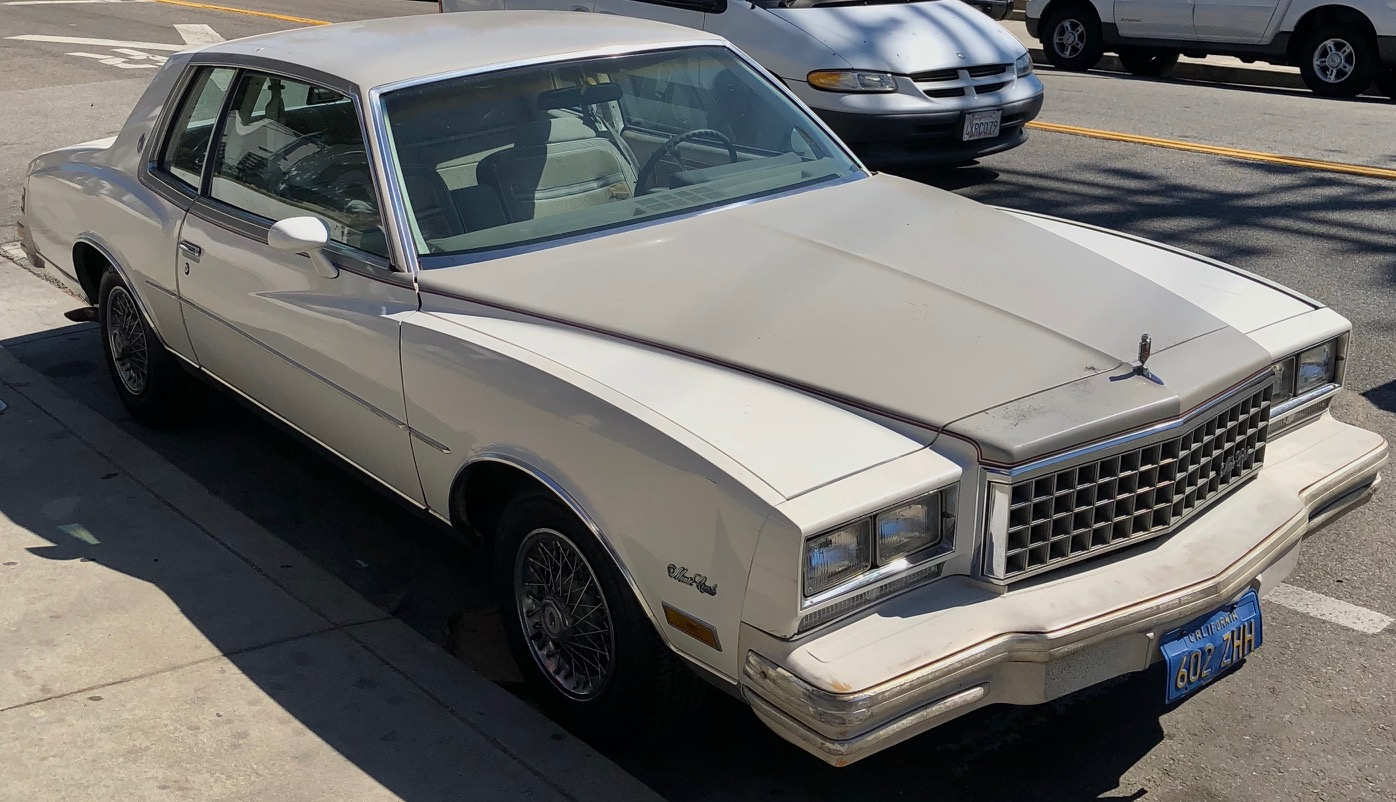
1980 Chevrolet Monte Carlo

For 1980, the car received a mild frontal restyle, with quad headlights and turn indicators mounted beneath. The metric 200 three-speed automatic transmission became standard on all models and a new Chevrolet-built 229 cu in (3.8 L) V6 with 2-barrel Rochester carburetor replaced both the 200 cu in (3.3 L) V6 of 1979 and the Buick engine offered on all 1978 models and the 1979 Landau as the standard engine in 49 states (California cars continued to use the Buick engine). A new option for 1980 was Buick's turbocharged version of the 231 cu in (3.8 L) V6 rated at 170 hp (127 kW). Other optional engines included 267 or 305 cu in (4.4 or 5.0 L) versions of the Chevrolet small-block V8 with up to 155 hp (116 kW). The front headroom was 37.6 inches, while the rear was 37.8 inches. A power trunk opener was still optional. There were 13,839 turbo Monte Carlos built in 1980. A new five-slot, 14-inch rally wheel option was introduced (the slots having squared ends and a pointed edge), this was later shared with subsequent Chevrolet/GMC A/G-bodies and the Chevrolet S10 light-duty truck.

Production Figures:

Chevrolet Monte Carlo Production Figures
	Yearly Total
1978	358,191
1979	316,923
1980	148,842
Total	823,956

== Fourth generation (1981–1988) ==
Fourth generation
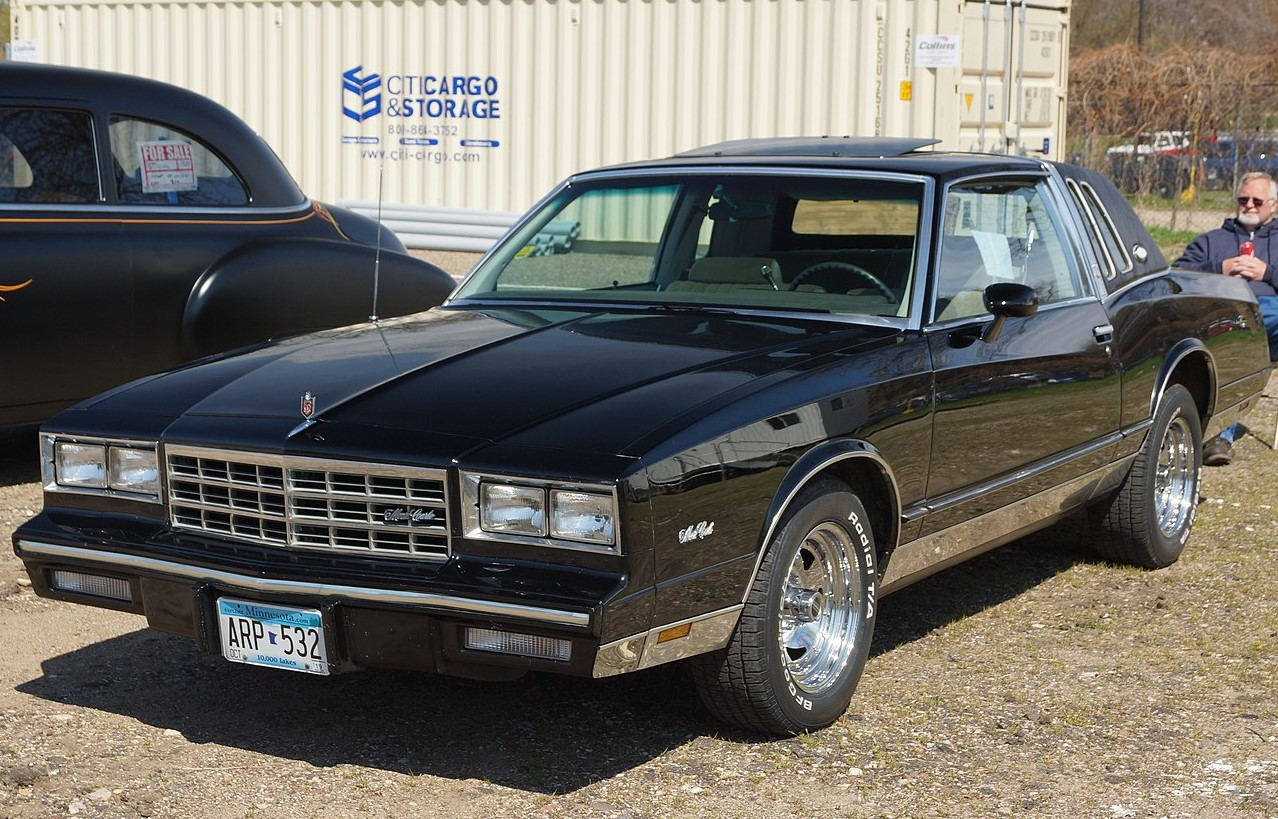
- 1983 Chevrolet Monte Carlo

Overview
- Production: 1980–1987
- Model years: 1981–1988
- Assembly: Arlington, Texas (1981–1987); Baltimore, Maryland (1981–1984); Fremont, California (1981); Leeds, Missouri (1981); Pontiac, Michigan (1987–1988); Oshawa, Ontario, Canada (1981); Ramos Arizpe, Coahuila, Mexico
- Designer: Irv Rybicki

Body and chassis
- Body style: 2-door coupe
- Layout: FR layout
- Platform: A-body (1981); G-body (1982–1988)
- Related: Buick Regal; Oldsmobile Cutlass Supreme; Pontiac Grand Prix

Powertrain
- Engine: gasoline: 3.75 L (229 cu in) LC3 V6; 3.8 L (232 cu in) Buick LD5 V6; 4.3 L (262 cu in) 4300 V6; 4.4 L (267 CID) Small-Block V8; 5.0 L (305 CID) Small-Block V8; 5.7 L (350 CID) Small-Block V8 (Mexico only); diesel: 4.3 L (263 CID) LT6 V6; 5.7 L (350 CID) LF9 V8
- Transmission: 3-speed TH-350 automatic 4-speed 200-4R automatic

Dimensions
- Wheelbase: 108.0 in (2,740 mm)
- Length: 200.4 in (5,090 mm) (LS); 202.4 in (5,140 mm) (SS)
- Width: 71.8 in (1,820 mm)
- Height: 54.0 in (1,370 mm) (LS); 54.9 in (1,390 mm) (SS)
- Curb weight: 3,212 lb (1,457 kg) (LS); 3,239 lb (1,469 kg) (SS)

=== 1981 ===
The body was restyled with the other GM mid-size formal coupes (Oldsmobile Cutlass Supreme, Pontiac Grand Prix, Buick Regal). It featured a smoother profile than the previous models and new vertical taillights similar to the 1973 through 1977 models. Engine offerings were carried over, including the standard 229 cu in (3.8 L) Chevrolet V6 (231 cu in (3.8 L) Buick V6 in California) an optional 267 cu in (4.4 L) V8 (not available in California), a 305 cu in (5.0 L) V8 in the base and Landau models, and a turbocharged 170 hp (127 kW) 231 cu in (3.8 L) Buick V6 in the Monte Carlo Turbo.

There were a total of 3,027 Monte Carlo Turbos for 1981. The Monte Carlo Turbo appeared slightly different from other Monte Carlos that year because, in addition to the turbo, it also was equipped with a small hood scoop on the left side of the hood. It also had "Turbo 3.8" badges with a Chevrolet bowtie on the sides of the hood scoop, the trunk lid, and the right side of the dash. Standard equipment included automatic transmission, power steering, and front disc brakes.

While some considered this car much better looking (and appeared more aerodynamic) than its Buick Regal, Pontiac Grand Prix, and Oldsmobile Cutlass cousins, only one team attempted to use the Monte Carlo in NASCAR cup racing. While the big Monte Carlo was the dominant body style in the late 1970s, winning many races, the downsized 1981 body would only take two checkered flags during the 1981 and 1982 seasons.

=== 1982 ===
Few revisions were made on the 1982 Monte Carlo. All engines, except for the turbocharged 231 cu in (3.8 L) V6, which was discontinued along with the Monte Carlo Turbo model, were carried over from 1981. New for 1982 were a 263 cu in (4.3 L) V6 and an Oldsmobile 350 cu in (5.7 L) V8, both of which were diesel engines. With the introduction of GM's new mid-size platform that saw the introduction of the Buick Century, Chevrolet Celebrity, Oldsmobile Cutlass Ciera, and Pontiac 6000, the chassis designations were changed. The new mid-size cars were designated as A-body cars, whereas the cars previously designated as A-bodies were now called G-bodies. A black exterior was not offered in 1982 and also not available in 1982 for the first time in Monte Carlo history was a sportier interior option with Strato bucket seats and console, as only the standard notchback bench or optional 55/45 bench were offered this year. Weight distribution was 57% in the front and 43% in the rear.

=== 1983 ===
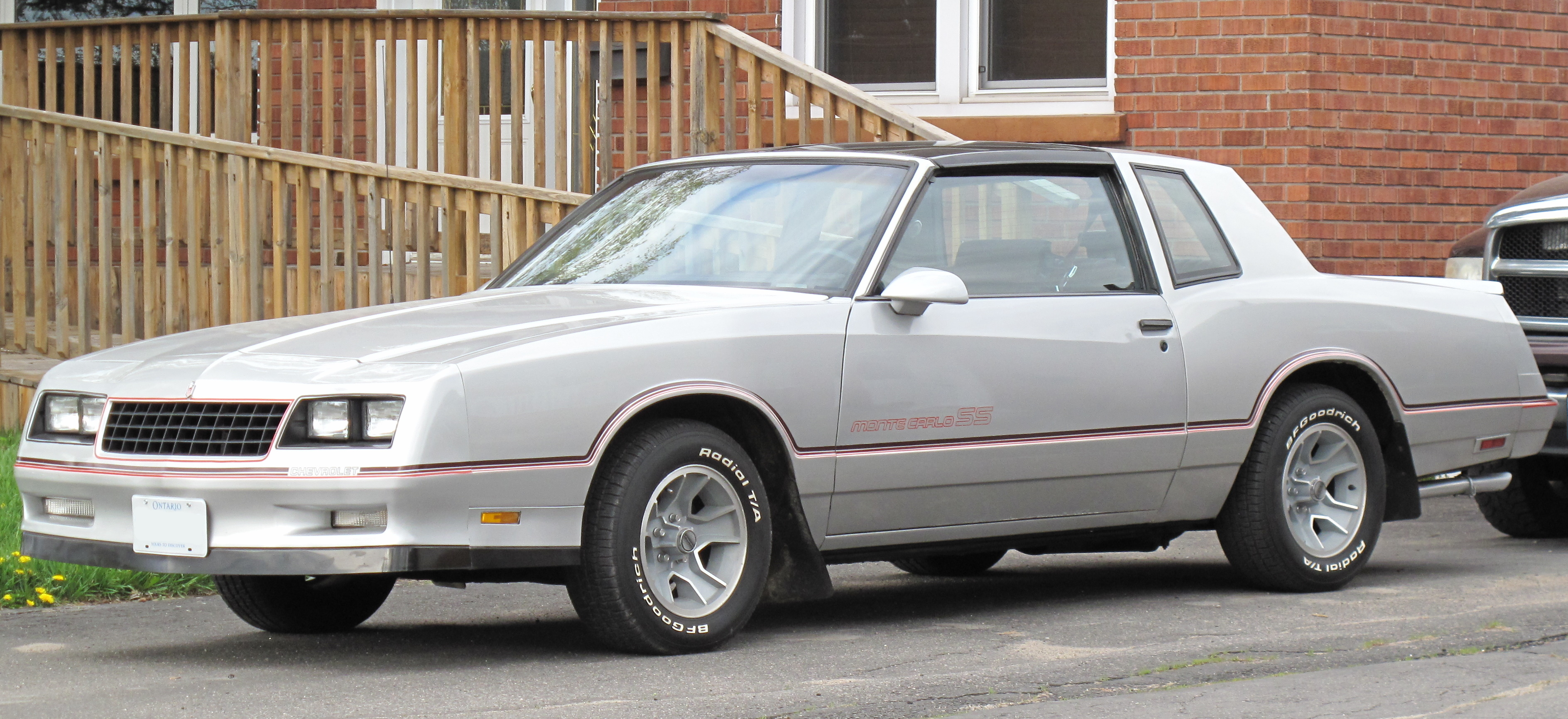
1983–1988 Chevrolet Monte Carlo SS

Receiving only minor updates, the 1983 model year Monte Carlo gained a revised grille and interior trim patterns. The standard engine continued to be the 229 cu in (3.8 L) V6, and the 150 hp (112 kW; 152 PS) 305 cu in (5.0 L) V8 was optional. The Monte Carlo SS was reintroduced in 1983 with the 175 hp (130 kW; 177 PS) 305 cu in (5.0 L) HO being standard, following twelve years of being discontinued. The Monte Carlo SS featured European body color-coding, a new front fascia, a rear spoiler, a performance axle ratio, the F41 suspension package, model-specific wheels and tires, as well as interior upgrades.

=== 1984 ===
The 1984 year model coupe production totaled 112,730 with an additional 24,050 had the SS option (with a 180 hp (130 kW) 305 V8 that saw a 5 hp (3.7 kW) boost from the previous year). The Monte Carlo SS was available with Strato bucket seats and floor console as extra-cost options for the first time in place of the standard split bench seat with armrest (the Strato buckets also returned as an option on the regular Monte after a two-year absence along with the T-top option.). The regular Monte Carlo came standard with a 125 hp (93 kW) 229 cu in (3.8 L) V6 (231 cu in (3.8 L) V6 for California) and a 165 hp (123 kW) 305 cu in (5.0 L) V8 was optional. The 350 cu in (5.7 L) diesel engine was available for the last year in a base Monte Carlo and were only 168 manufactured.

All engines for 1984 included the three-speed automatic transmission except for three SSs at the end of the 1984 production run that received the Turbo Hydramatic 200-4R transmission with overdrive. In 1984, a limited number of Monte Carlo SSs were made in Mexico for Mexican sale. The differences are many compared to US/Canadian SSs. There was no rear spoiler. The wheels were 14-inch checker style, an option on the base Monte Carlos in the US. The side mirrors are in a different style and painted black. The interior is from the Grand Prix and is only in blue. The engine was a 350 cu in (5.7 L) V8, and the transmission was a 4-speed manual with a Hurst shifter.

=== 1985 ===
For 1985, additional SS colors (black, maroon, and silver in addition to white), pinstriping, and options were made available. The (later to be highly sought after) medium blue ("gunmetal") color for the SS was dropped. A four-speed automatic overdrive transmission, the Turbo Hydramatic 200-4R, with a revised sport rear axle ratio with a 3.73:1 gear, became standard on the SS. Discontinued were the 229 cu in (3.8 L) V6 and 350 cu in (5.7 L) V8 diesel engines. Introduced in place of the 229 V6 was a 262 cu in (4.3 L) V6 (RPO LB4) that was fuel-injected with throttle-body fuel injection. The small block 305 cu in (5.0 L) V8s included computer-controlled 2-barrel Quadrajet carburetors with an automatic choke to improve starting.

The 1985 Chevrolet Monte Carlo was no longer available with a diesel engine. The base model's previously standard 3.8 L Chevy V6 was changed to a 4.3 L V6 with throttle-body fuel injection. This increased output to 130. The optional 5.0 L V8 gained horsepower via an increased compression ratio. Horsepower rating went from 150 to 165. The High Output 5.0 L V8 in the 1985 Chevrolet Monte Carlo SS remained at 180 horsepower. 10.5-inch front disc brakes were standard, with drum brakes on the rear. A/C was $730. The V6 and base V8 were available with either a three- or four-speed automatic transmission, but the H.O. V8 in the SS came only with a four-speed automatic this year. The base coupe was visually unchanged except for pin-striping, optional T-tops, or a vinyl-covered roof. The SS version was modified. Previously offered only in white or dark blue metallic, color choices were expanded to include silver, maroon, and black. "Removable glass roof panels" (T-tops) came on board as a midyear option. Nearly 120,000 Monte Carlos were sold in 1985. Though the total was down from 1984, the SS model saw sales climb from 24,050 to 35,484. The 1985 Monte Carlo SS also came with a 35-millimeter sway bar.

=== 1986 ===
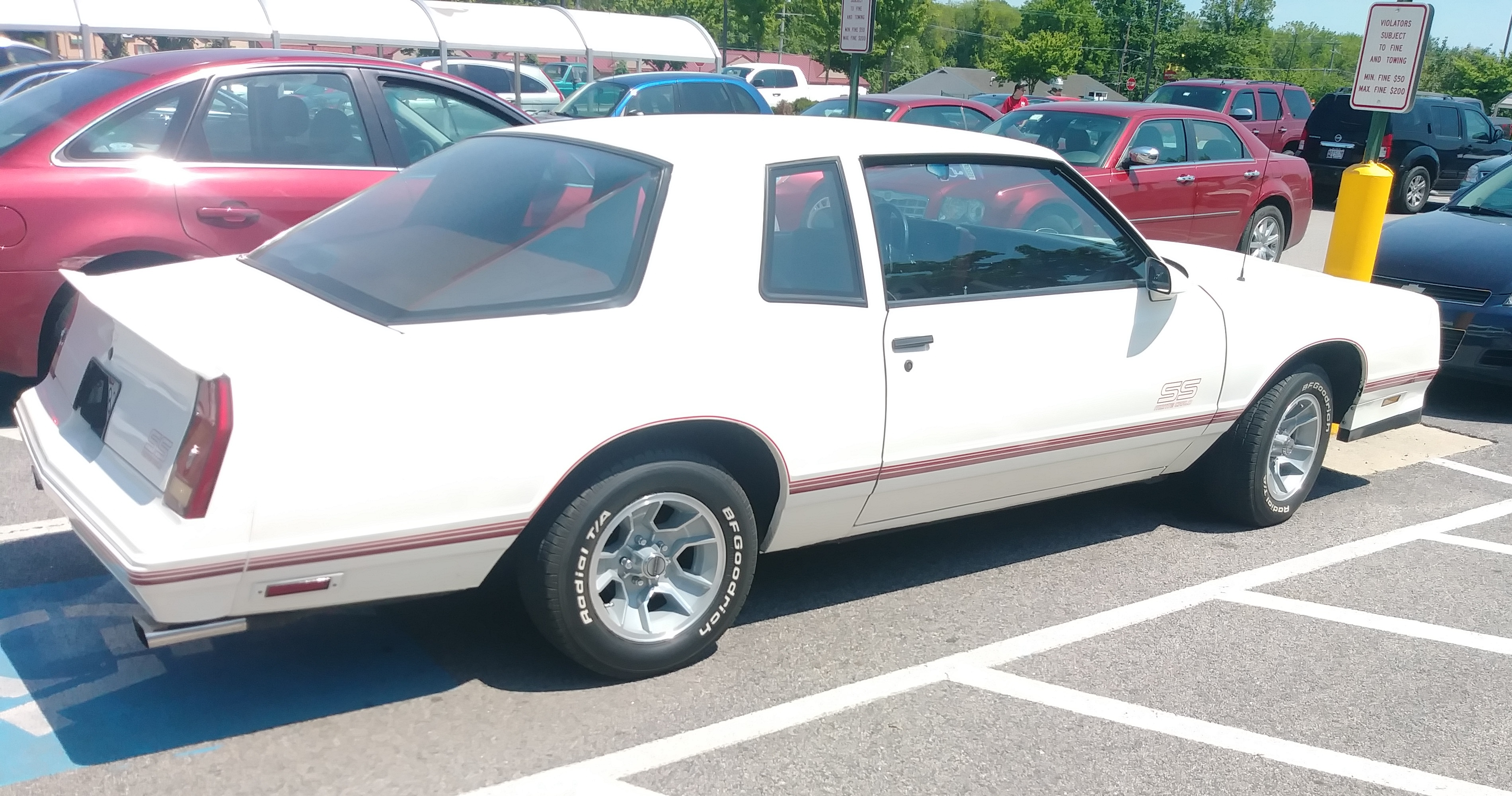
1986 Chevrolet Monte Carlo Aerocoupe

For 1986, there were four distinct trim levels available. The base model Sport Coupe was still available with the same general body panels that it had since 1981, but featured new "aero" side mirrors similar to those on Camaros and Chevrolet Corvette of the 1980s. New for the 1986 model year was a Luxury Sport model with a revised front fascia, new "aero" side mirrors, and an updated sleek-looking rear fascia. The LS front fascia included "Euro" headlights with removable bulbs in a glass composite headlamp housing, versus the smaller sealed beam glass headlights of previous years. The rear bumper of the LS no longer had a "notch" between the bumper and trunk, and the taillights wrapped around so that they were visible from the sides of the car. The 1986 Super Sport model incorporated "aero" mirrors yet utilized the previous year's styling for the rear bumper.

New for 1986 was the Aerocoupe model. Modifications to the Super Sport body included a more deeply sloped rear window and a shorter trunk lid with a lower spoiler than the previous Super Sports version. A total of 200 Aerocoupes were sold, which was the number NASCAR required for road model features to be incorporated into the racing cars. All 200 were built in Arlington, Texas, finished in white with burgundy interior and sent to Cars & Concepts in Michigan for the conversion.

=== 1987 ===
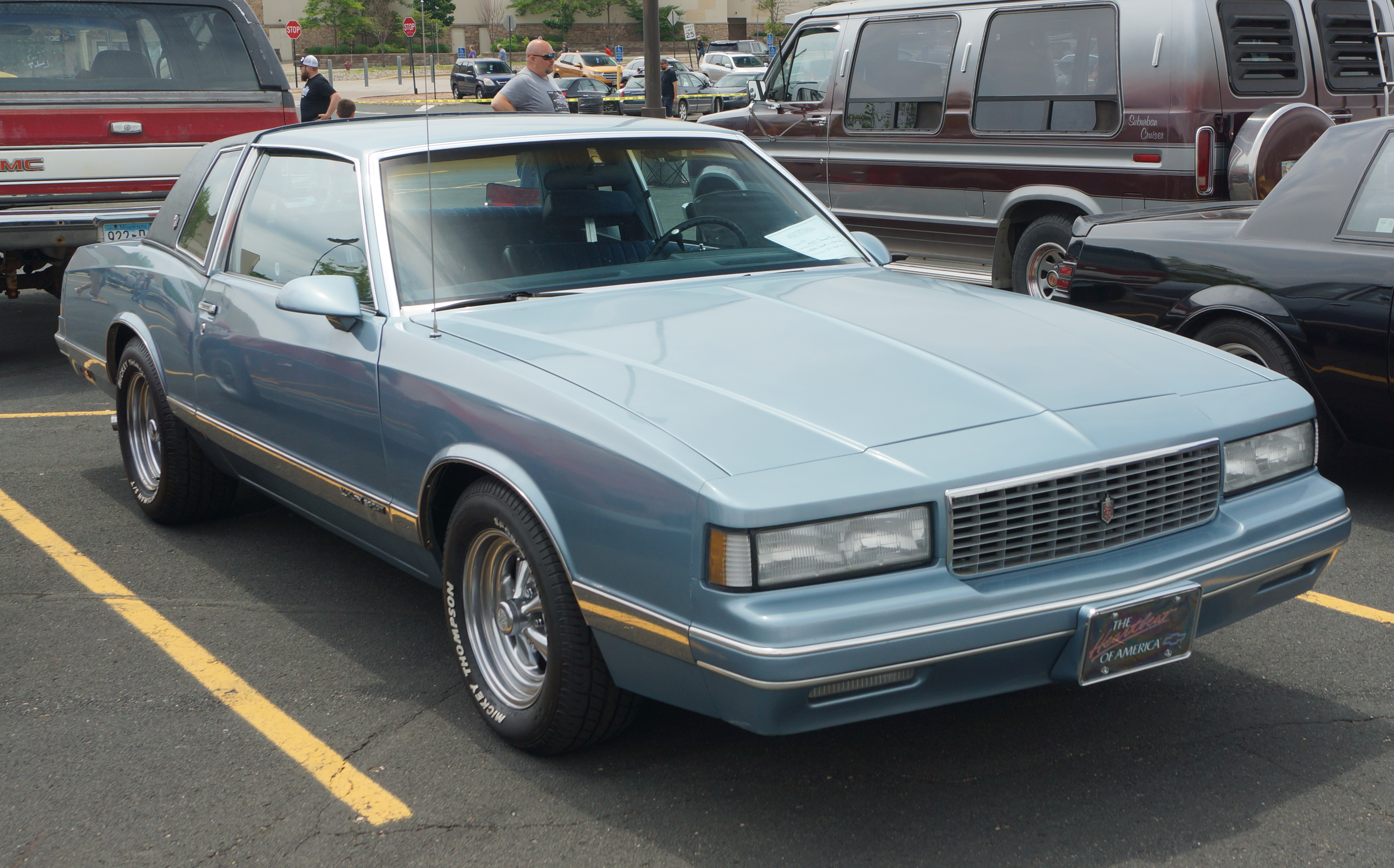
1987 Chevrolet Monte Carlo LS

In 1987, Chevrolet eliminated the Sport Coupe version of the Monte Carlo, leaving the LS, SS, and Aerocoupe. The Super Sport incorporated the "smoothed" rear bumper and tail lamps first introduced on the 1986 Luxury Sport; the "lay-down" spoiler was introduced midway through the production year. The Aerocoupe made up 6,052 of the 39,251 Super Sports produced that year. A total of 39,794 Luxury Sports were produced in 1987.

=== 1988 ===
The Monte Carlo returned for a shortened 1988 model year, largely carryover from 1987. The Monte Carlo SS now only offered a lay-down style spoiler (dropping the stand-up spoiler), with the LS seeing no visible changes.

The Aerocoupe did not return, as Chevrolet had unveiled its intention to enter the Chevrolet Lumina coupe into NASCAR racing for 1989 – before the production vehicle was released to dealers as an early 1990 model. The design was more aerodynamic compared to the Monte Carlo SS.

The final G-platform Monte Carlo – a silver SS — was produced by Arlington Assembly on December 12, 1987; production in the shortened model year fell to 30,174 units (16,204 Monte Carlo SS).

Production Figures:

Chevrolet Monte Carlo Production Figures
	Coupe	SS	Aerocoupe	Yearly Total
1981	187,850	-	-	187,850
1982	92,392	-	-	92,392
1983	91,605	4,714	-	96,319
1984	112,730	24,050	-	136,780
1985	83,573	35,484	-	119,057
1986	77,846	41,164	200	119,210
1987	72,993	33,199	6,052	112,244
1988	13,970	16,204	-	30,174
Total	732,959	154,815	6,252	894,026

== Fifth generation (1995–1999) ==
Fifth generation
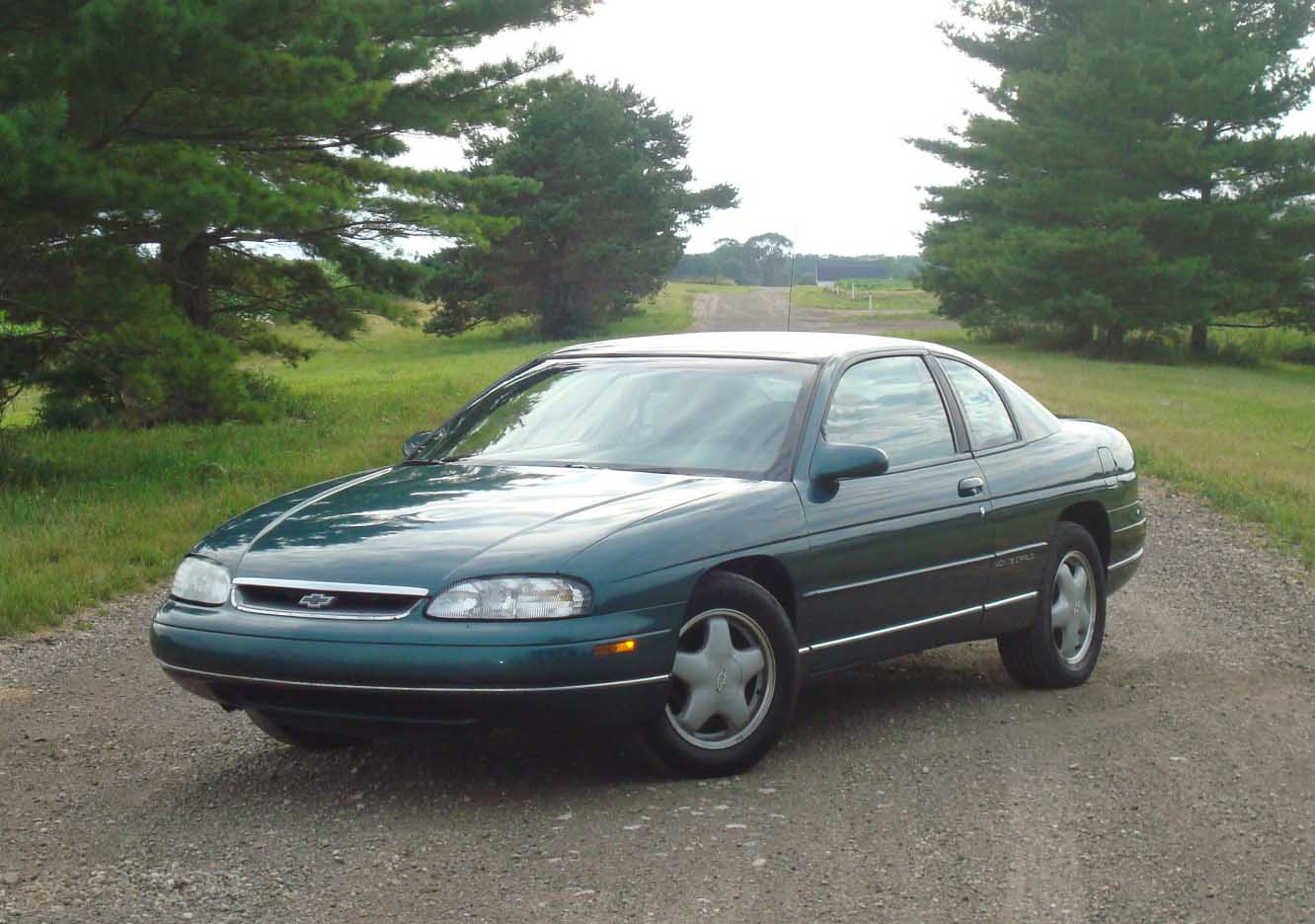

Overview
- Production: February 14, 1994–September 1999
- Model years: 1995–1999
- Assembly: Oshawa, Ontario, Canada
- Designer: Chuck Jordan (1991)

Body and chassis
- Body style: 2-door coupe
- Layout: Transverse front-engine, front-wheel drive
- Platform: GM W platform
- Related: Chevrolet Lumina; Oldsmobile Cutlass Supreme; Pontiac Grand Prix

Powertrain
- Engine: 1995–99 3.1 L (190 cu in) L82 V6; 1995–97 3.4 L (210 cu in) LQ1 DOHC V6; 1998–99 3.8 L (230 cu in) L36 V6
- Transmission: 4-speed 4T60-E automatic 4-speed 4T65-E automatic

Dimensions
- Wheelbase: 107.5 in (2,730 mm)
- Length: 200.7 in (5,100 mm)
- Width: 72.5 in (1,840 mm)
- Height: 53.8 in (1,370 mm)

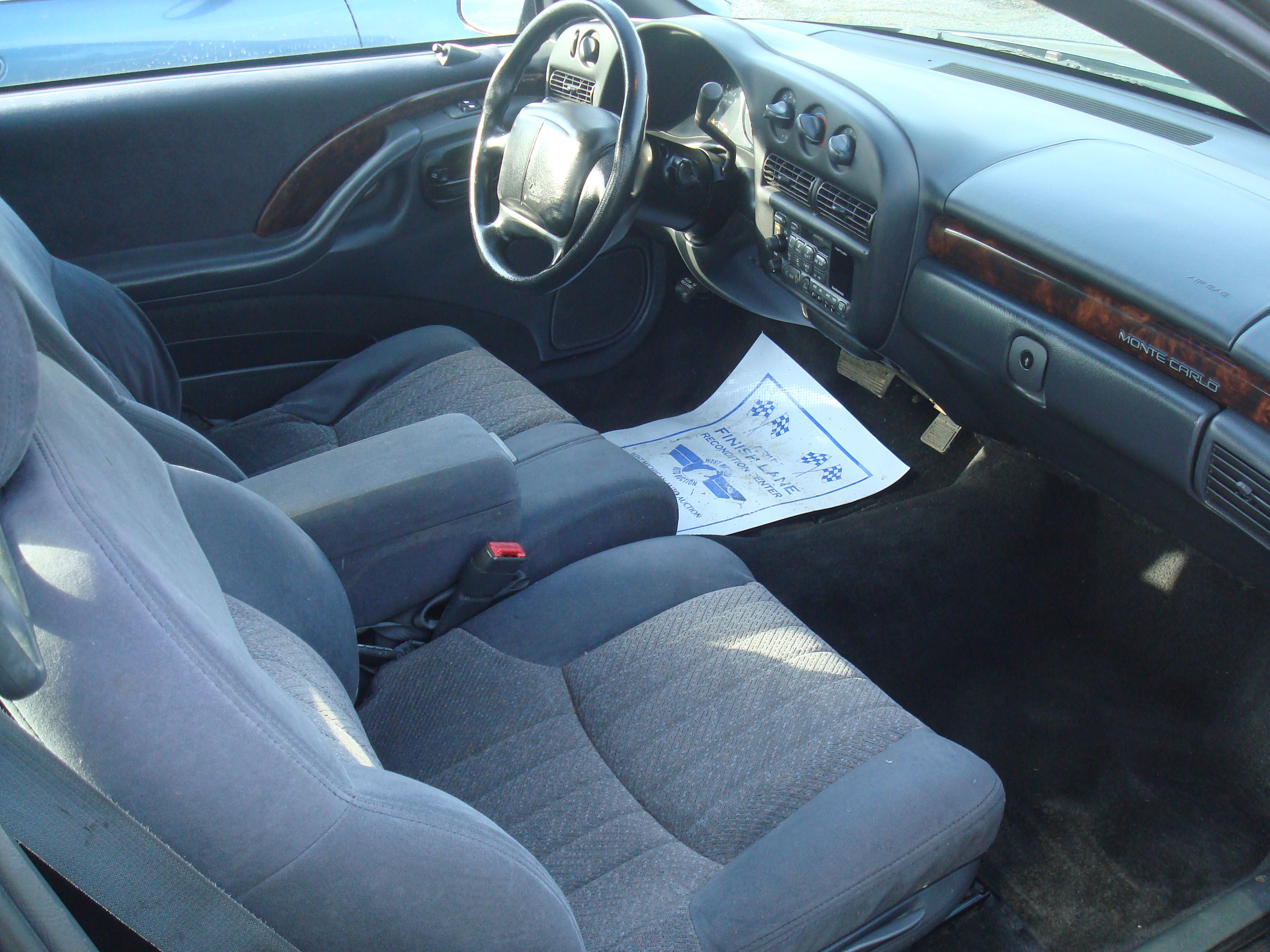
1997 Monte Carlo LS interior

The two-door Lumina was renamed as Monte Carlo for the 1995 model year. Deriving its design from a namesake 1992 concept car, the fifth-generation Monte Carlo was again a counterpart of the Buick Regal, Oldsmobile Cutlass Supreme, and Pontiac Grand Prix coupes (and sedans). Shifting to the GM W-body chassis meant the Monte Carlo became front-wheel drive for the first time and no V8 engine was available. The Monte Carlo was assembled alongside the Lumina in Oshawa, Ontario, Canada.

In its revival, the Monte Carlo was exclusively a coupe (in contrast to its divisional counterparts). Alongside the second-generation Lumina, the Monte Carlo was fitted with dual airbags and ABS (adding daytime running lights in 1997).

The Monte Carlo shared its trim with the second-generation Lumina, including a base LS and a sport-oriented Z34. The two versions were externally similar, with the Z34 featuring red-colored badging, a lower front air dam, and blacked-out trim (instead of chrome). Z34s were equipped with 16-inch 5-spoke alloy wheels, which were an option for the LS (in place of 15-inch wheelcovers). For 1998, the Z34 received redesigned alloy wheels, with the previous style remaining optional on the LS.

The LS was powered by a 160hp 3.1L V6; the Z34 used a 215hp 3.4L V6; for 1998, the Z34 received a 200hp 3.8L V6 (increasing torque output). All three V6 engines were paired to a 4-speed automatic transmission.

In LS trim, the fifth-generation Monte Carlo was the final mass-produced six-passenger, two-door sedan offered for sale. As with nearly all coupes (and many four-doors), the Z34 was offered with bucket seats and a floor-mounted shifter.

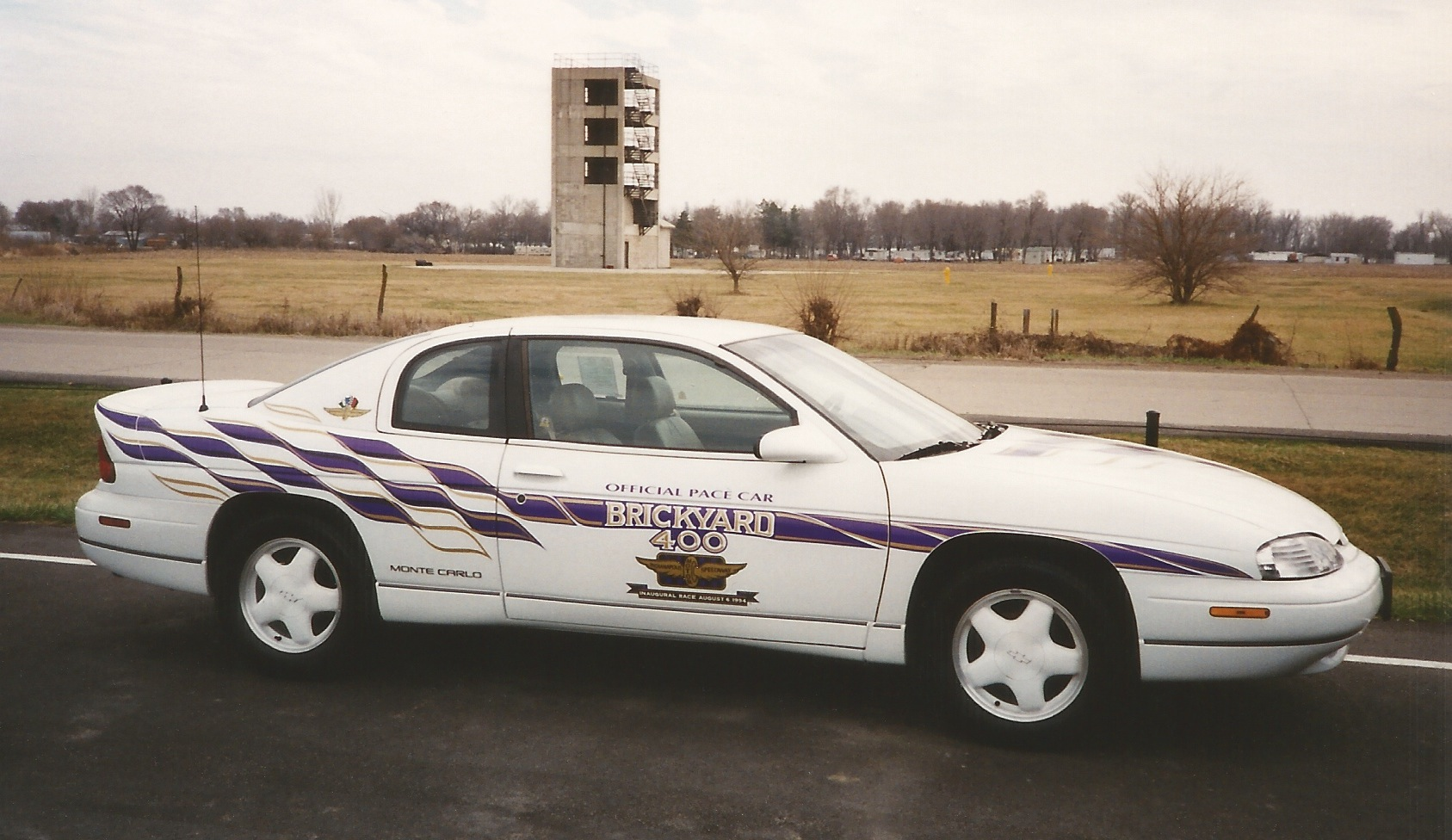
1995 Monte Carlo Z34 Brickyard 400 Pace Car Edition

=== Special editions ===
A run of four hundred 1995 Z34s were made called the "Monte Carlo Brickyard 400 Pace Car". The $2195 option included interior ornamentation, embroidered leather 45/55 seating with a full floor console, an aero wing spoiler, and an accent stripe package.

For 1997, Chevrolet made a limited production run of Monte Carlo Brickyard 400 pace cars, though none were available for consumers.

=== Production totals ===
Year	Z34	LS	Total
1995	39,628	61,310	100,938
1996	15,384	30,063	65,447
1997	11,756	59,173	70,929
1998	20,688	48,702	69,390
1999	16,031	53,748	69,779
Total production	103,487	252,996	376,483

=== Models ===
Model	Years	Engine	Power	Torque
LS	1995–1999	3.1 L 3100 V6	160 hp (119 kW)	185 lb⋅ft (251 N⋅m)
Z34	1995	3.4 L LQ1 DOHC V6	210 hp (157 kW)	215 lb⋅ft (292 N⋅m)
Z34	1996–1997	3.4 L LQ1 DOHC V6	215 hp (160 kW)	220 lb⋅ft (298 N⋅m)
Z34	1998–1999	3.8 L L36 3800 V6	200 hp (149 kW)	225 lb⋅ft (305 N⋅m)

== Sixth generation (2000–2007) ==
Sixth generation
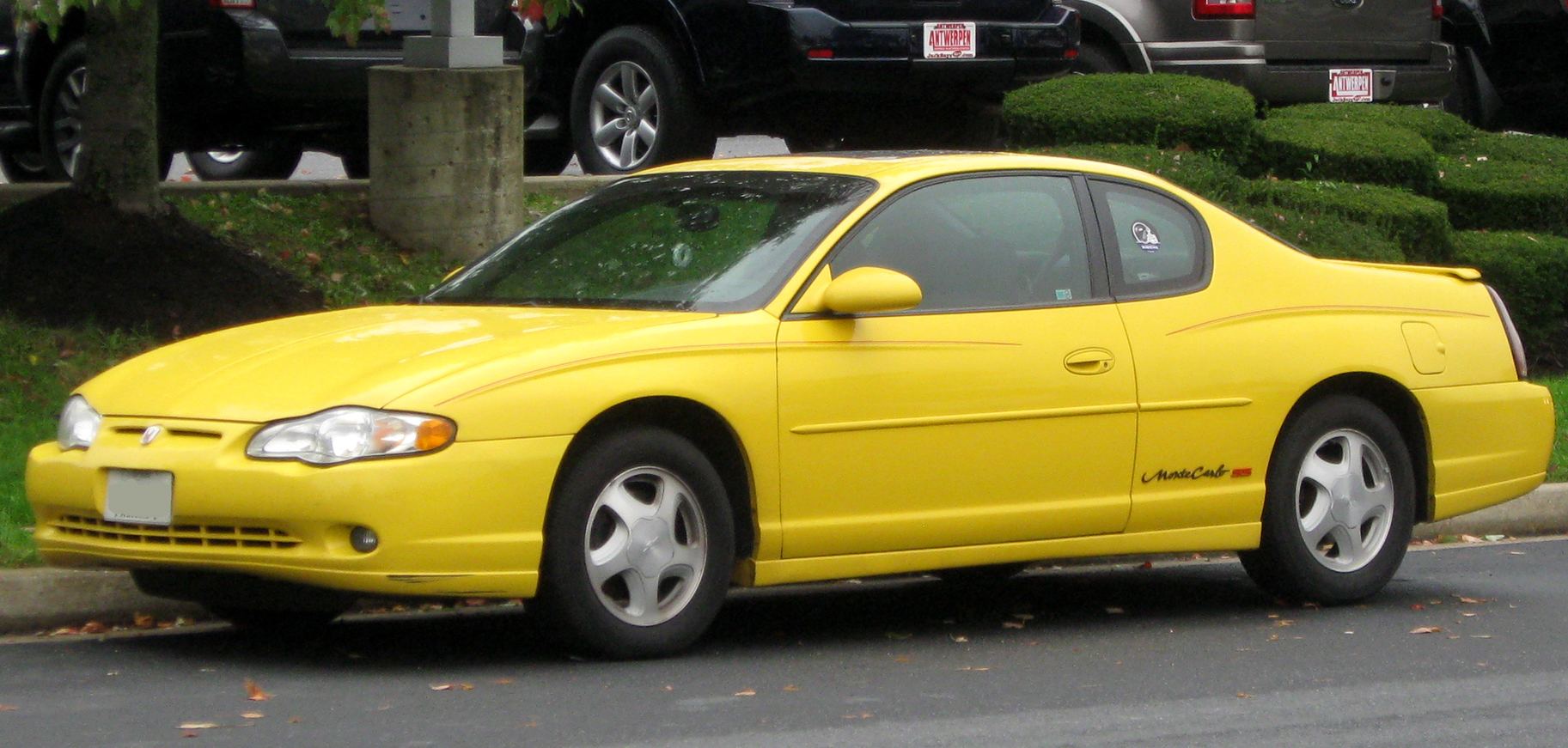

Overview
- Production: October 1999–2007
- Model years: 2000–2007
- Assembly: Oshawa, Ontario, Canada
- Designer: Wayne Cherry (1996)

Body and chassis
- Body style: 2-door coupe
- Layout: Transverse front-engine, front-wheel drive
- Platform: GM W platform GMX230 (2000-2005); GMX231 (2006-2007)
- Related: Buick Century; Buick LaCrosse; Buick Regal; Chevrolet Impala; Oldsmobile Intrigue; Pontiac Grand Prix

Powertrain
- Engine: 3.4 L LA1 V6; 3.8 L L36 V6; 3.8 L L67 SC V6; 3.5 L LZE V6; 3.9 L LZ9 V6; 5.3 L LS4 V8
- Transmission: 4-speed 4T65-E automatic; 4-speed 4T65E-HD automatic

Dimensions
- Wheelbase: 110.5 in (2,810 mm)
- Length: 2000–2005: 197.9 in (5,030 mm); 2006–2007: 196.7 in (5,000 mm)
- Width: 2000–2005: 72.7 in (1,850 mm); 2006–2007: 72.9 in (1,850 mm)
- Height: 2000–2005: 55.2 in (1,400 mm); 2006–2007: 55.8 in (1,420 mm)

=== 2000–2005 ===
For 2000, Chevrolet not only again called upon GM Motorsports for design inspiration. The Super Sport moniker returned, replacing the Z34 designation of the fifth generation, which was a Lumina Coupe. Chevrolet also retired the Lumina name, bringing back the Impala nameplate for the Monte Carlo's sedan counterpart. At the request of racing teams, Chevrolet stylists added a slight "hump" on the rear trunk. From the NASCAR circuit came the aerodynamic styling and ducktail spoiler. The 6th generation Monte Carlo is based on the Monte Carlo "Intimidator" concept car, presented in 1997. Trim levels initially were the LS and SS, the latter being the first front-drive SS in the Chevrolet lineup. The LS used a 3.4 L OHV V6, while the SS used the 3.8 L V6. A Supercharged SS model was added for 2004 and 2005; the naturally aspirated SS continued as well, but was relabeled as LT for MY 2005.

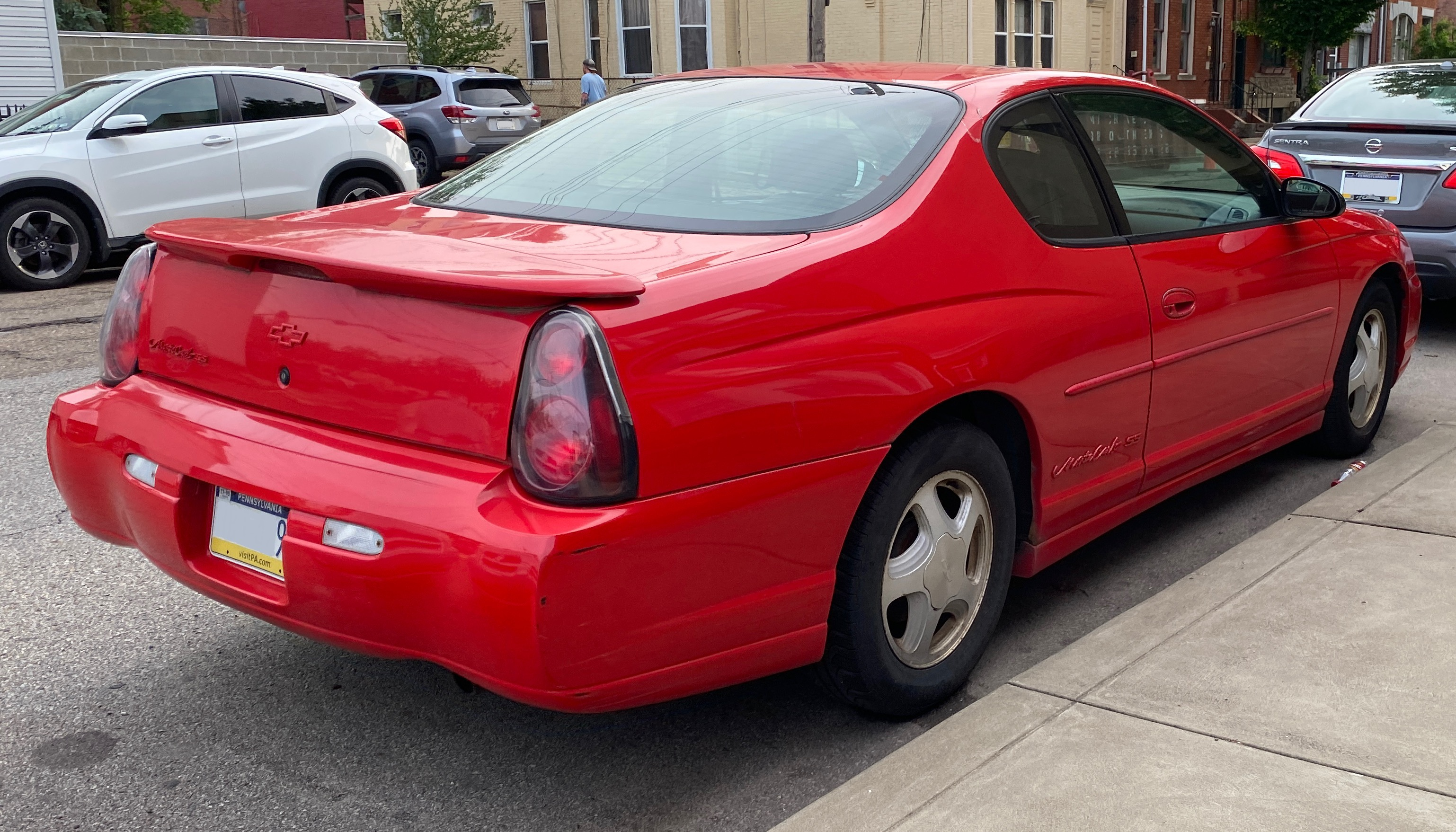
2000-2005 Chevrolet Monte Carlo SS rear view

=== 2006–2007 ===
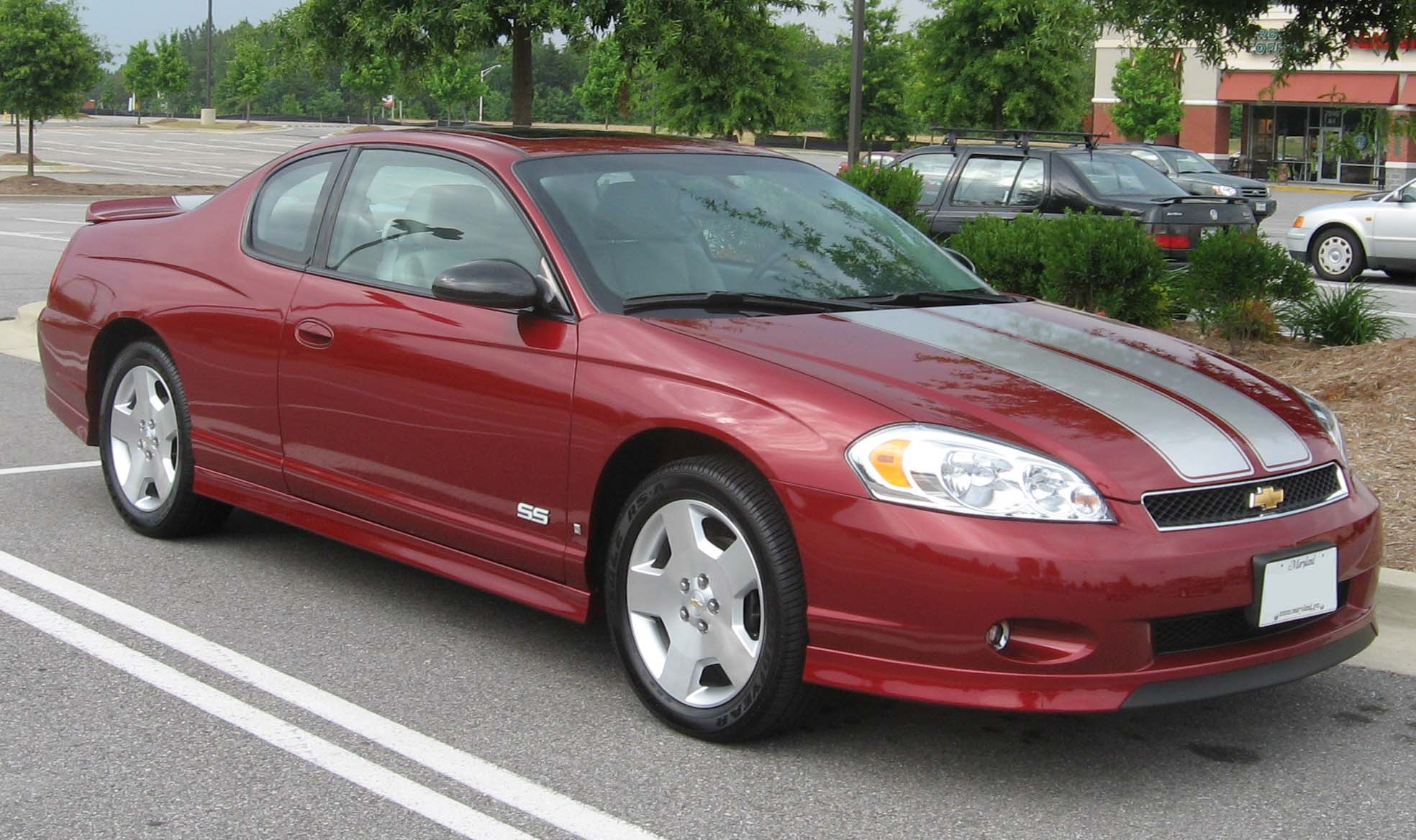
2006–2007 Chevrolet Monte Carlo SS

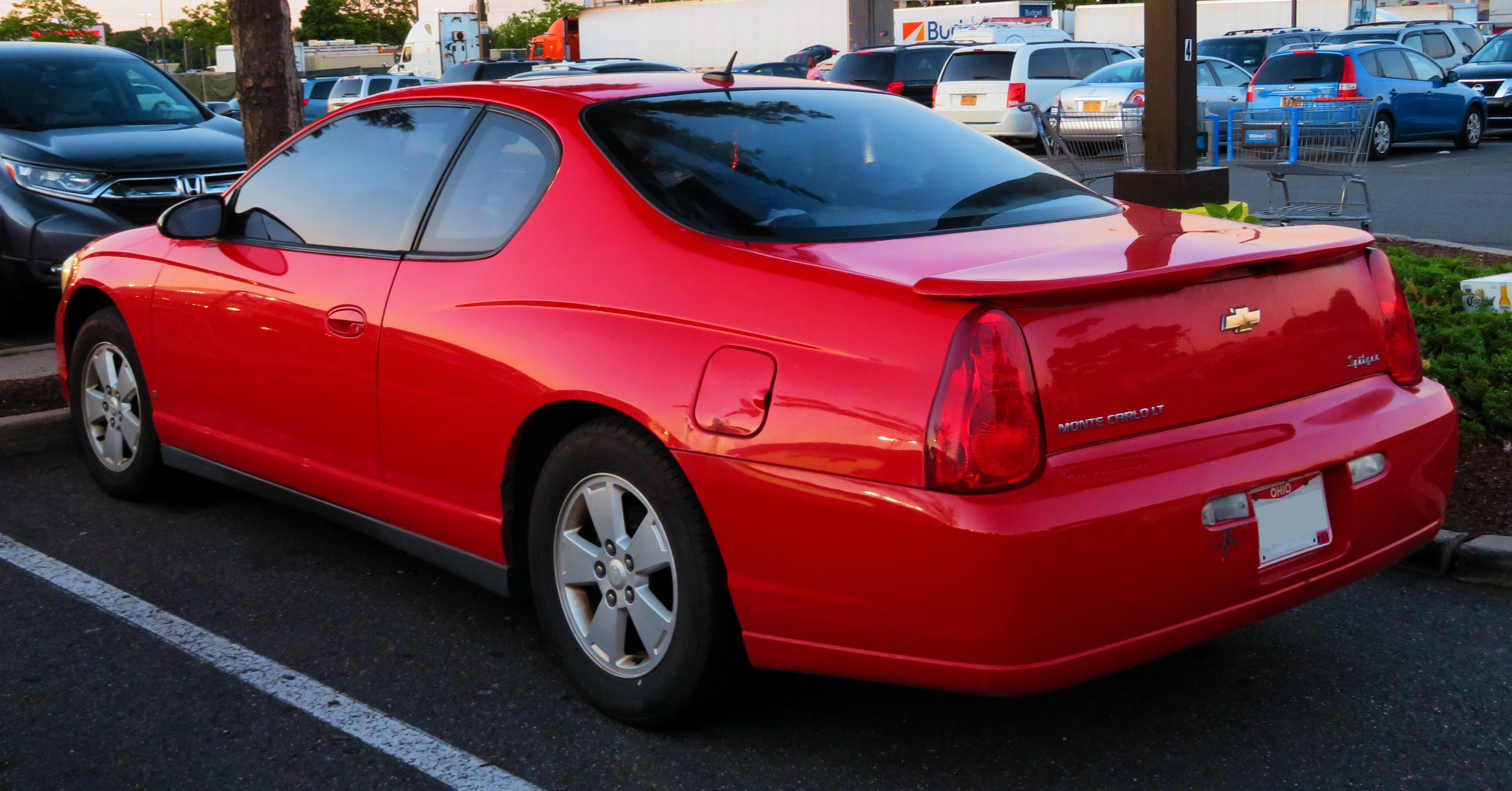
2006–2007 Chevrolet Monte Carlo rear view

The facelifted 2006 Monte Carlo and the companion Impala sedan were introduced at the 2005 Los Angeles Auto Show. The base engine was a 3.5 L V6 producing 211 hp (156 kW). Trim series for this generation include the entry-level LS, the mid-level LT, the upper-level LTZ and, the top-of-the-line SS. Only 14,829 SS models were produced over the two years, 8,794 in 2006 and 6,035 in 2007. The SS models used the generation IV small-block V8 — the first V8 since 1988. The 5.3 L V8 produced 303 hp (226 kW). The interior for 2006 was mildly redesigned.

The revised model also added an improved interior with expanded Driver Information Center (DIC), enhanced ABS and traction control, as well as optional, seat-mounted side airbags for the front driver and passenger.

The LT and LTZ models were available with the 3.9 L engine in 2006. For 2007 the LTZ model was dropped along with the engine in favor of the Flex Fuel 3.5 L as the exclusive engine for non-SS models.

=== Specialty nameplates ===
Chevrolet released several models inspired by contemporary NASCAR drivers: The first model released was the 2002 Dale Earnhardt Signature Edition, also called Intimidator Edition. This car had two color schemes: a black body with galaxy silver rocker panels, front and rear air dams, and an all-black body with black ground effects. A thin red stripe above the silver ground effects was also included. Just behind the rear side windows, the Dale Number 3 logo was placed with Earnhardt's signature below the Number 3 logo. The car also featured silver "Intimidator" SS badges on the right side of the trunk, and standard Monte Carlo SS badges on the bottom of the vehicle, just in front of the rear tires. An Intimidator badge with the number 3 also appeared on the dash, and Earnhardt's signature appeared on the gauge cluster. The interior is all black ("charcoal") leather. This edition also came with 5-spoke, diamond-cut wheels and received a GM L36 3800 V6 engine.

In 2003, the Jeff Gordon edition was released. The vehicle came with a Superior Blue body color and silver ground effects, just like the Intimidator Edition; however, the Jeff Gordon edition also received lighter blue ghost flames on the body. It featured the number 24 behind the rear side windows. A Jeff Gordon signature was placed on the right side of the trunk, and inside the car received a Jeff Gordon badge on the dashboard and a two-tone gray and black leather-wrapped steering wheel and shift knob. It featured 5-spoke, diamond-cut wheels and a GM L36 3800 V6 engine.

In 2004, the Dale Jr. Edition came out; it was red with a black high sport kit. The number 8, with an "E" stripe design went from the doors to the rear bumper. The 5-spoke diamond cut wheels featured a black stripe through each spoke, and Dale Jr.'s signature appeared on the right side of the trunk lid. On the sides, the vehicle received Supercharged SS badges. Inside, a #8 badge appeared on the dash, and Dale Jr.'s signature was on the cluster. This edition also featured the #8 on floor mats and headrests. This was also the first nameplate car to receive a GM L67 Supercharged 3800 V6 engine. The fan speed for heat and air conditioning was changed from the previous year's five settings to 10.

The Intimidator Edition was re-released in 2004. However, the vehicle featured "Intimidator" badges on the trunk lid and both side panels. The car was all black, received the five-spoke, diamond cut wheels, and included the GM L67 Supercharged 3800 V6 engine.

The 2005 featured the final commemorative edition, the Tony Stewart version. It was all black but featured a white/orange line that thickened as it reached the back of the vehicle and contained the number 20 just before the rear tires. Tony Stewart's signature also appeared behind the rear windows on both sides. The Chevy bowtie on the trunk was white in this edition, and another was painted on the front of the hood. The Monte Carlo badge was removed and replaced with the black Tony Stewart grille. The wheels were the same design as the Dale Jr. Edition, except the bowtie on the center cap was white this time. This edition also received a GM L67 Supercharged 3800 V6 engine.

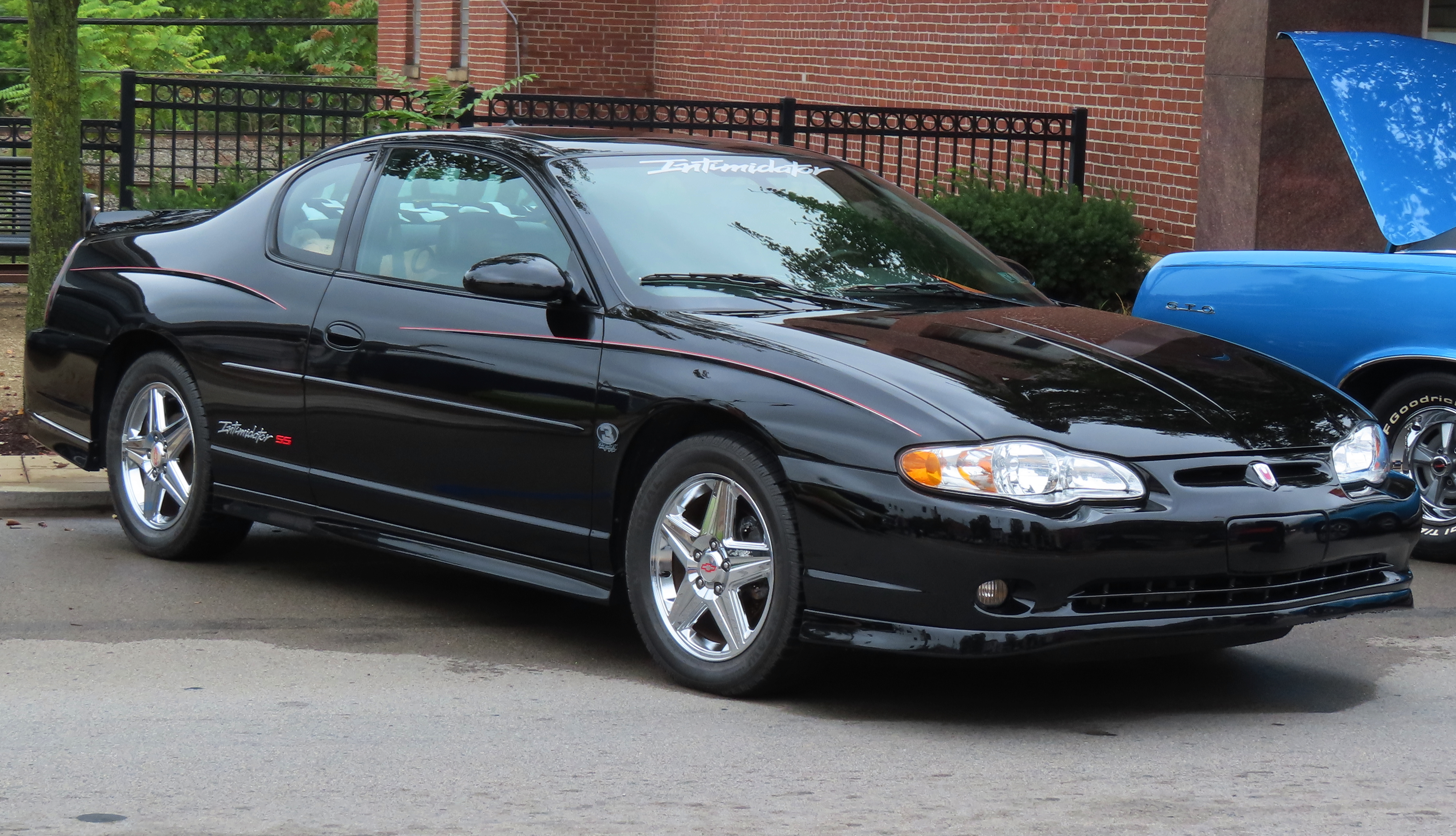
2004 Chevrolet Monte Carlo Intimidator SS

=== Pace Car Editions ===
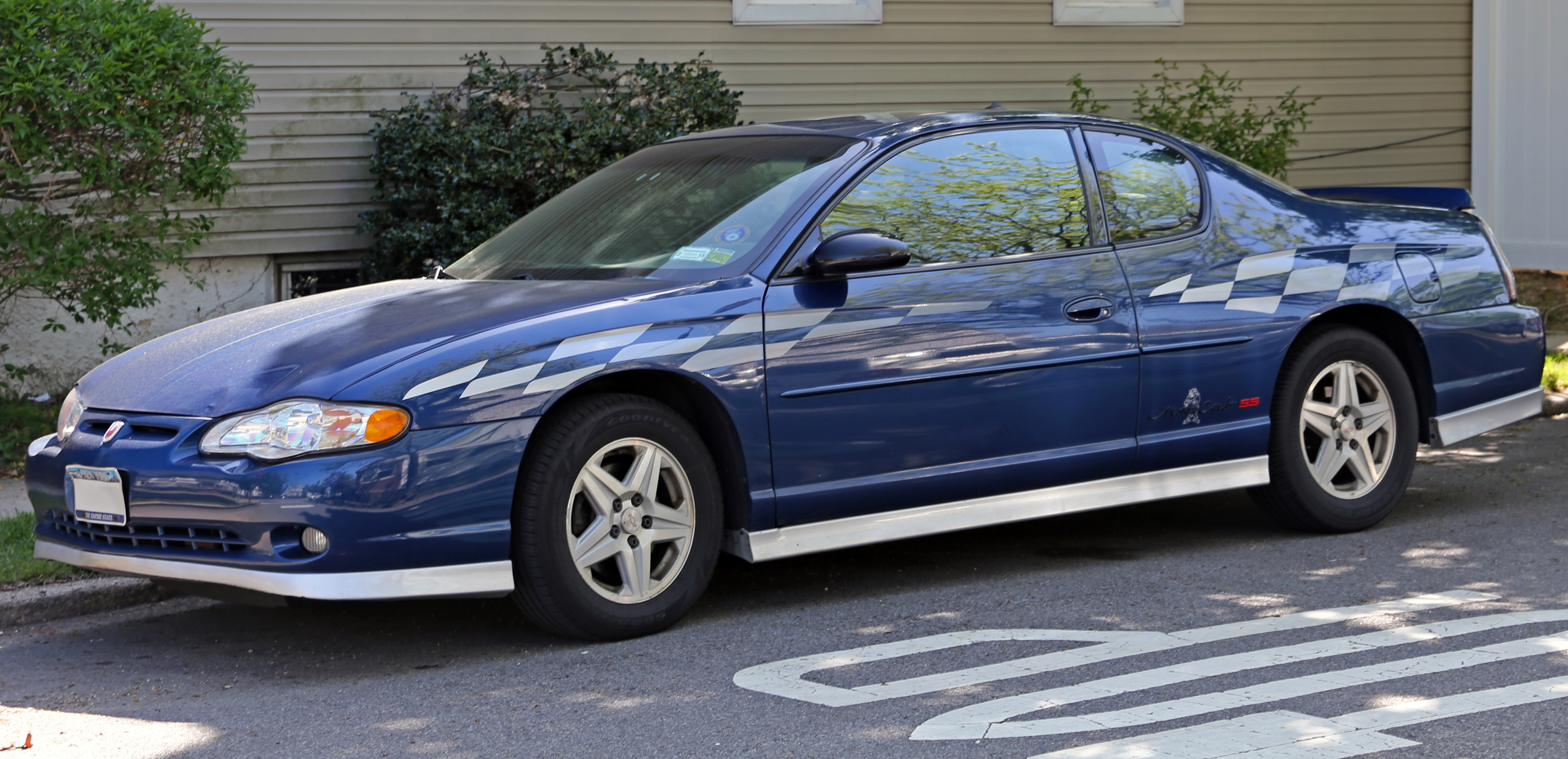
2003 Pace Car edition

General Motors released several Monte Carlos branded as "Pace Car" replicas. Each year featured a different color and had limited production; however, all cars had some standard features. All pace cars received: Galaxy Silver ground effects, checkered flagging on fenders & doors, "Tasmanian Devil" decals on quarter panels, and trunk lid behind the "Monte Carlo" script. It also has a "race-inspired" rear spoiler that resembles the look of the NASCAR spoiler, a limited edition plaque on the trunk lid, "Monte Carlo" script on the dash is replaced with "PACE CAR" a gauge cluster displays "LIMITED EDITION" below the speedometer where it would say "Apply Brake To Shift From Park," 16-inch diamond-cut cast-aluminum wheels, door opening kick plates featuring the Monte Carlo nameplate, and stainless-steel dual exhaust tips. Interiors had two-tone leather from 1999 through 2002 to match the exterior with 2003 being solid black and Chevy "bow-tie" embroidered headrests. All cars also came with GMs L36 3800 V6 engine.

- 2000 Pace Car:

Production limited to 2,222 cars. Sports two-tone leather black and red. Exterior: Torch Red with Galaxy Silver ground effects.

- 2001 Pace Car:

Production limited to 1,300 cars. Sports two-tone leather black and silver. Exterior: Black with Galaxy Silver ground effects.

- 2002 Pace Car:

Production limited to 1,150 cars. Sports two-tone leather black. Exterior: Competition Yellow with Galaxy Silver ground effects.

- 2003 Pace Car:

Production limited to 1,401 cars. Sports leather Ebony Black seats with ebony and gray leather-wrapped steering wheel. Exterior: Superior Blue Metallic with Galaxy Silver ground effects.

=== Engines ===
Engine	Model	Years	Power	Torque	Transmission
3.4 L LA1 V6	LS	2000–2005	180 hp (134 kW)	205 lb⋅ft (278 N⋅m)	4T65E
3.8 L L36 V6	SS	2000–2004	200 hp (149 kW)	225 lb⋅ft (305 N⋅m)	4T65E
3.8 L L36 V6	LT	2005	200 hp (149 kW)	225 lb⋅ft (305 N⋅m)	4T65E
3.5 L LZE V6	LS, LT	2006–2007	211 hp (157 kW)	214 lb⋅ft (290 N⋅m)	4T65E
3.8 L L67 supercharged V6	SS Supercharged	2004–2005	240 hp (179 kW)	280 lb⋅ft (380 N⋅m)	4T65E-HD
3.9 L LZ9 V6	LT, LTZ	2006	242 hp (180 kW)	242 lb⋅ft (328 N⋅m)	4T65E
5.3 L LS4 V8	SS	2006–2007	303 hp (226 kW)	323 lb⋅ft (438 N⋅m)	4T65E-HD

=== Production totals ===
Year	Units
2000	64,347
2001	71,268
2002	70,781
2003	71,129
2004	64,771
2005	37,143
2006	32,567
2007	10,889
Total production	422,895

Production of the 2006–2007 SS totaled 14,829 units.

== Discontinuation ==
The Monte Carlo ceased production at Oshawa Car Assembly Plant #1 following an announcement in February 2007 of its demise. On June 19, 2007, the last two 2007 Chevrolet Monte Carlo models rolled off the line at the Oshawa Assembly Plant. The last two models were identical "SS" models with Precision Red exterior paint, silver rally stripes, and Ebony Nuance leather interior. The vehicle was discontinued due to declining sales in coupes in general and the company's plans to revive the Chevrolet Camaro, which would cannibalize sales of the Monte Carlo.

General Motors retained the final Monte Carlo off the production line for the Heritage Center collection. The second-to-last Monte off the line was auctioned on August 15, at Manheim's Statesville Auto Auction in Statesville, North Carolina. The winning bid went to Fred Simon, owner of Simon Chevrolet in Woonsocket, RI, where it is displayed at the dealership. This car was at the Indianapolis Motor Speedway over the weekend of July 27–29 for the 2007 Allstate 400 at the Brickyard. While there, it was signed by all the current Team Chevrolet drivers who were active in the NASCAR Nextel Cup Series.

== NASCAR ==
From 1971 until the car's end of production in 1988, the Monte Carlo campaigned in NASCAR racing. The 1973–1977 cars were the dominant body style through the years until 1980, when NASCAR mandated a move to the shorter 110-inch (2,794 mm) wheelbase cars being built by Detroit. The 1981 and 1982 (referred to as the "flat-nose") Monte Carlo was raced by few teams and only won two races in those years. In 1983, the addition of the SS nose became the Monte Carlo body style used in NASCAR until the car went out of production.

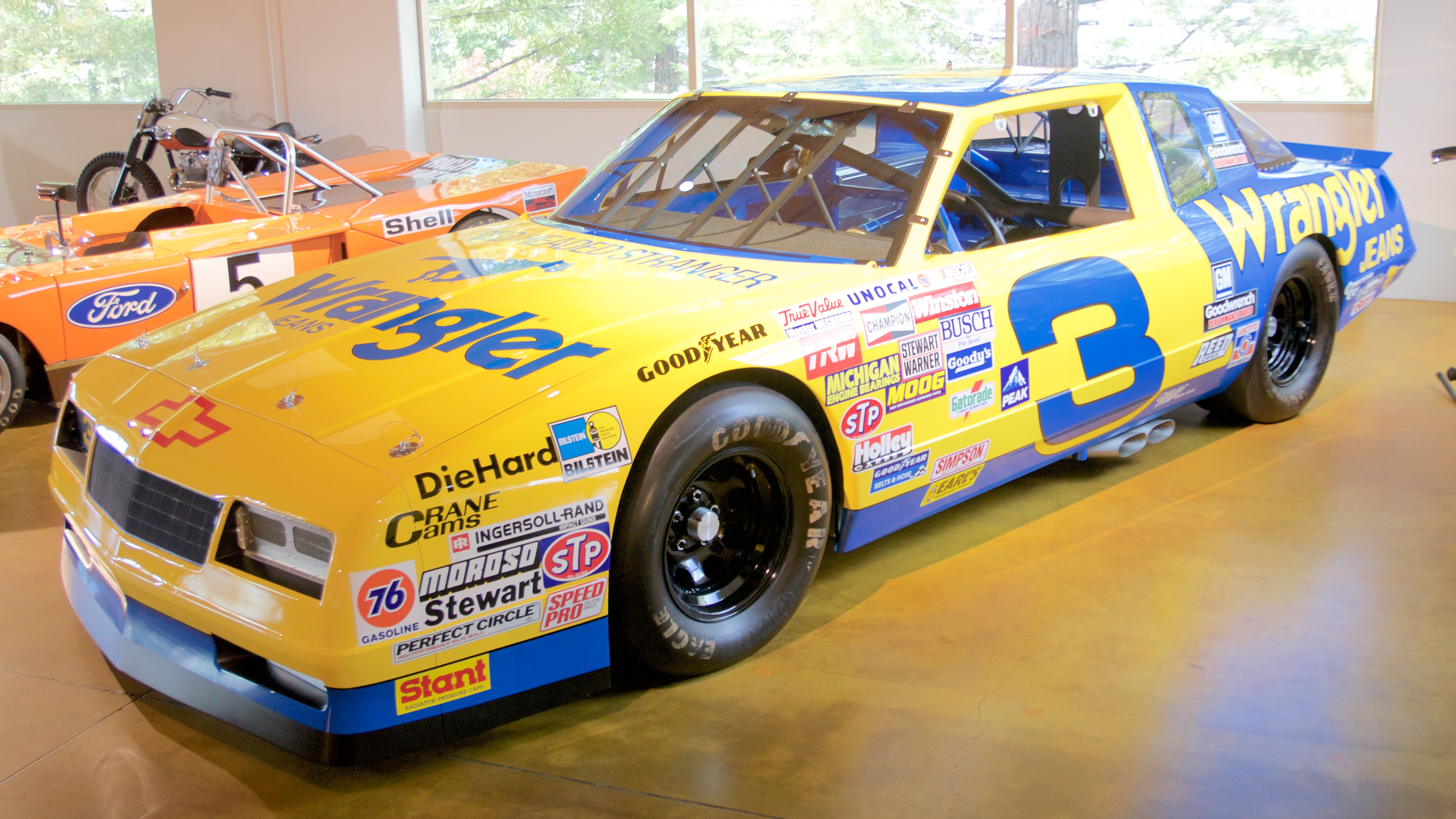
Dale Earnhardt's 1987 Monte Carlo.

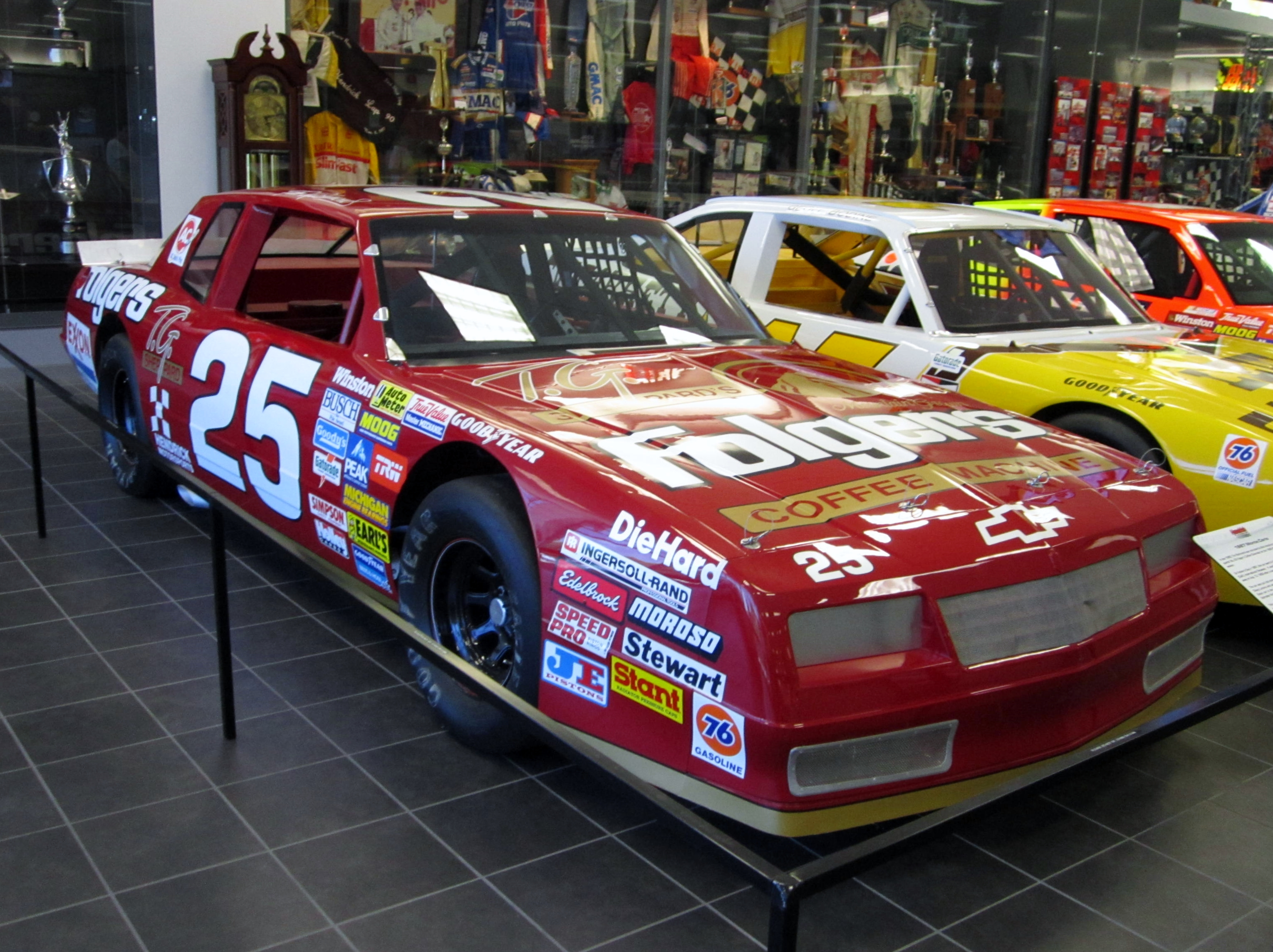
Tim Richmond's Monte Carlo on display.

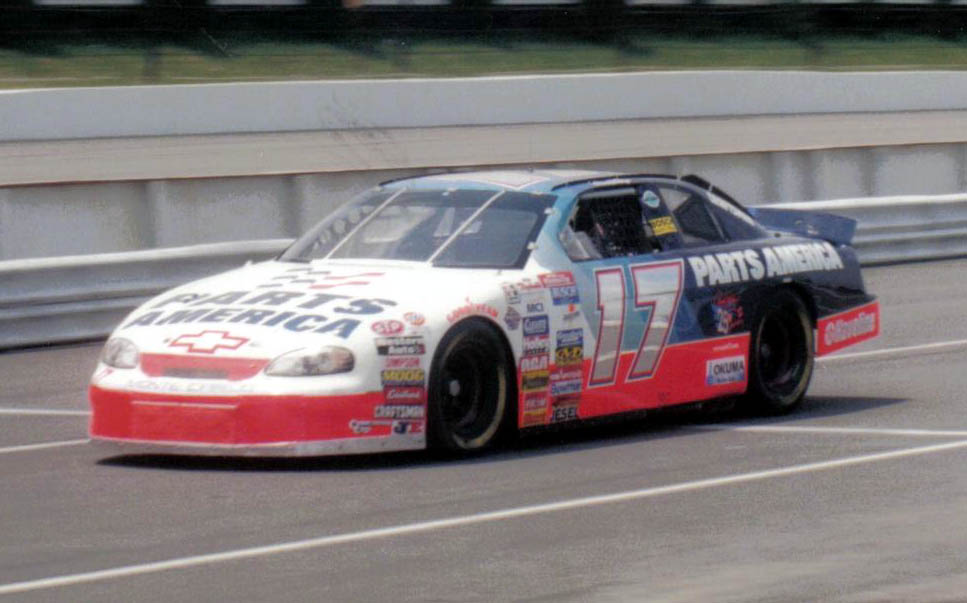
Darrell Waltrip in a Monte Carlo in 1997

The Monte Carlo returned for the 1995 season with the fifth-generation body, but NASCAR allowed the car to have wider rear quarter panels, and this deviated from factory sheet metal, which the race-spec cars had to use until that time. The 1995 body style was also a favorite on the NASCAR circuit and enjoyed considerable success at the track. The car captured several NASCAR Manufacturers Cup awards until it again was discontinued from production in 2007, and replaced by the Impala for racing. The car's last ever win was at the 2007 Dickies 500 with Jimmie Johnson. In total, the Monte Carlo and Monte Carlo SS accumulated 396 wins in the NASCAR Cup Series, the most of any nameplate in the history of the series.
